= USS John Blish =

United States Navy survey ship

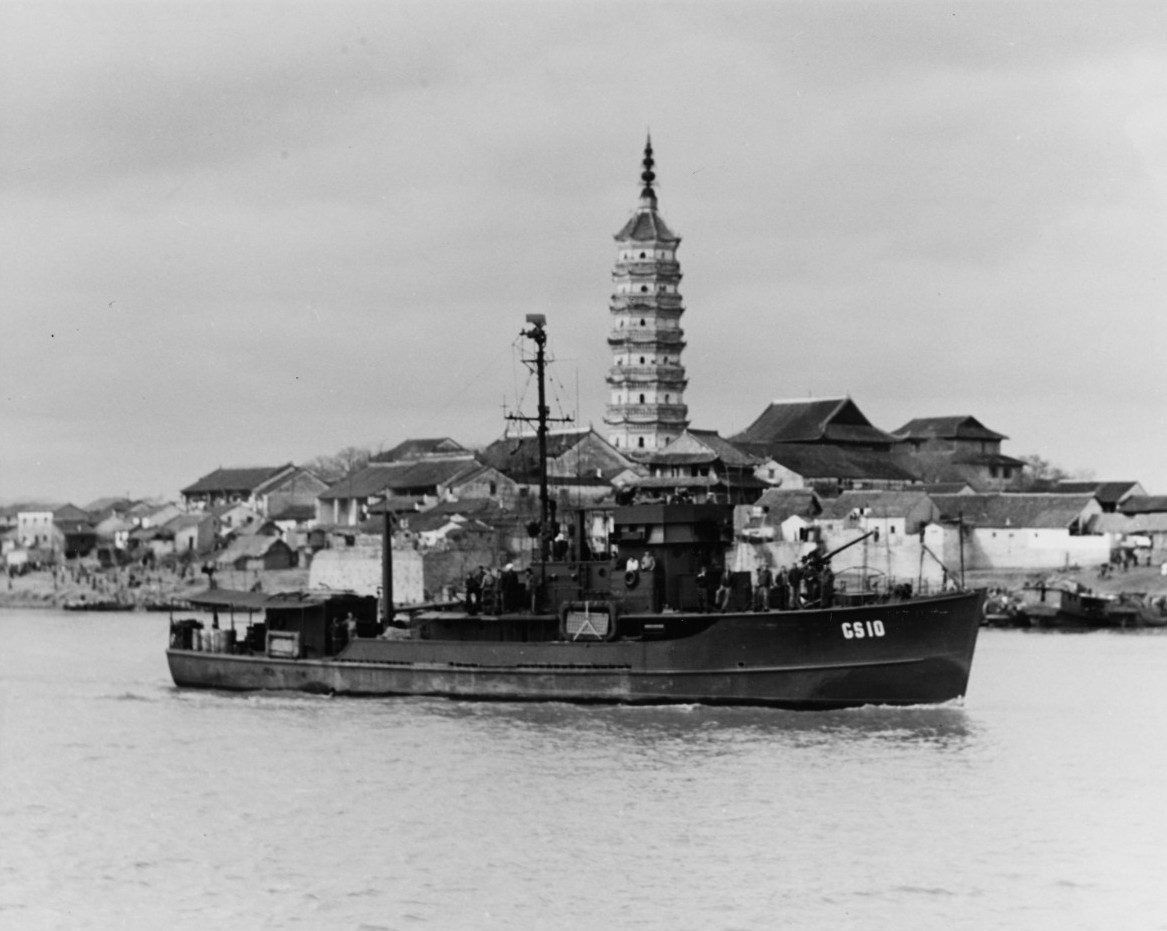
- John Blish in the Yangtze river, China, December 1945.

History

United States
- Name: PCS-1457; John Blish
- Namesake: Commander John Bell Blish, USN
- Builder: Ballard Marine Railway Co., Seattle, Washington
- Laid down: 23 May 1943
- Launched: 6 September 1943
- Commissioned: 26 February 1944
- Decommissioned: 22 August 1949
- Fate: Sold 10 February 1950 to Boston Metals Co. of Baltimore for scrap
- Notes: Ship International Radio Callsign: NTYX

General characteristics
- Class & type: PCS-1376 Patrol Coastal Sweeper
- Displacement: 245 t. (light), 338 t. (full)
- Length: 136 feet
- Beam: 24 feet 6 inches
- Draft: 8 feet 7 inches
- Propulsion: Two 800bhp General Motors 8-268A diesel engines
- Speed: 14,1 knots
- Complement: 57
- Armament: One 3 in (76 mm) Dual Purpose Mount, one single 20 mm AA mount

USS John Blish was a Patrol Craft Sweeper (PCS) of the PCS-1376-Class, five of which were converted to small hydrographic survey vessels designated AGS and later coastal survey vessels, AGSc, that conducted hydrographic surveys for the United States Navy during and immediately after the Second World War. (Note: The other PCS types that became AGS/AGSc vessels were USS Derickson (AGS-6) ex PCS-1458 (USC&GS Derickson 17 May 1944), USS Littlehales (AGS-7) ex PCS-1388, USS Dutton (AGS-8) ex PCS-1396 and USS Armistead Rust (AGS-9) ex PCS-1404.) The small PCS type vessels assigned to the United States Navy Hydrographic Office missions conducted pre invasion surveys, sometimes under fire, with the survey crews erecting signals for survey and later navigation, laying buoys and placing lights.

Originally, PCS-1457 the survey vessel, conducted surveys supporting the Mariana Islands campaign, the landings at Iwo Jima the ship was renamed and redesignated John Blish (AGS-10) before conducting surveys supporting the landings at Okinawa. After the war John Blish was redesignated at a coastal survey ship, AGSc, conducting surveys off the United States West Coast until decommissioned at New York on 22 August 1949.

== Construction and commissioning ==
PCS-1457, planned as PC-1457, was reclassified PCS in April 1943 and laid down by Ballard Marine Railway Company, Seattle, Washington on 23 May 1943. The vessel was launched on 6 September 1943 sponsored by Miss Patricia McQuire and on 26 February 1944 commissioned as USS PCS-1457 sailing for the Pacific war zone after shakedown and training.

The mission of the small survey vessels involved pre invasion surveys, sometimes under fire, with the survey crews erecting signals for survey and later erecting navigation, laying buoys and placing lights for further operations as well as conducting routine surveys of islands in fleet operating areas.

== Pacific wartime operations ==
PCS-1457 supported the recapture of the Marianas, specifically Guam and Tinian landings with surveys before and after the invasion. After the Marianas operations the ship conducted general surveys in the Pacific until February 1945 when she conducted pre invasion surveys at Iwo Jima followed by surveys as the island was being secured. Charts resulting from surveys were printed on board USS Sumner with a survey team from that ship erecting a reference navigational signal atop Mount Suribachi.

On 20 March 1945, PCS-1457 was reclassified as a Hydrographic Survey Ship (AGS-10) and four days later was renamed John Blish. The survey vessel continued more routine survey work until the invasion of Okinawa where she again supported landings with hydrographic work. The ship earned 4 battle stars for World War II service.

== Post war ==
John Blish was reclassified as a Coastal Surveying Ship (AGSC-10) on 27 July 1946 and conducted coastal surveys on the West Coast of the United States until sailing for New York and decommissioning on 22 August 1949. On 10 February 1950 she was sold to Boston Metals Company of Baltimore, Maryland for scrap.

== Ship namesake ==
The survey vessel was named for Commander John Blish, USN (September 5, 1860 - December 22, 1921) who was appointed Cadet Midshipman 18 September 1875. From 1879 to 1901 he served the Navy both on the high seas and on various shore duty. On 5 October 1901 he was commissioned Lieutenant Commander then served until he retired 6 July 1905. Blish was appointed Commander on the retired list 13 April 1911. During World War I he served in the 1st Naval District as assistant to the Commandant, and commanded the Naval Air Station at Squantum, Mass. Comdr. Blish was detached 29 October 1919. In addition to his naval career, he invented the "Blish sounding tube" and the Blish lock, used in the Thompson submachine gun. John Blish died on 22 December 1921.

== Bibliography ==
- Naval History And Heritage Command. "John Blish". Dictionary of American Naval Fighting Ships. Naval History And Heritage Command.
- NavSource. "John Blish (AGSC 10)". NavSource.
- Pinsel, Mark I. (1982). 150 Years Of Service On The Seas - A Pictorial History of the U.S. Naval Oceanographic Office from 1830 to 1980. Bay St. Louis, Mississippi: Department of the Navy, Oceanographic Office. LCCN 2009366059.
