= USS Dutton =

Two ships of the United States Navy have borne the name Dutton in honor of Captain Benjamin Dutton, Jr.

- USS Dutton (AGS-8), the former PCS-1396, a survey ship in commission from 1944 to 1949.
- USNS Dutton (T-AGS-22), the former SS Tuskegee Victory, placed in service as a survey ship in 1958.
