= USS Nokomis (SP-609) =

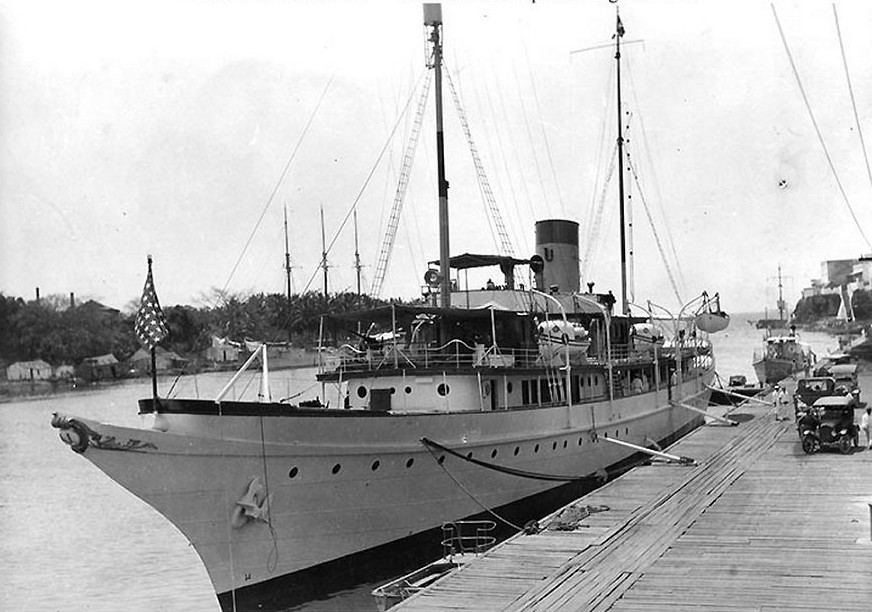
- USS Nokomis (SP-609) dockside.

History

United States
- Name: Nokomis II (also simply Nokomis)
- Namesake: Nokomis
- Owner: Horace E. Dodge of Detroit, Michigan
- Builder: Pusey & Jones of Wilmington, Delaware
- Yard number: 360
- Laid down: 1916
- Launched: 27 December 1916
- Completed: April 1917 (trials)
- Acquired: 1 June 1917
- Commissioned: 3 December 1917 in Philadelphia, Pennsylvania, as Nokomis (SP-609)
- Decommissioned: 25 February 1921
- In service: July 1921
- Out of service: 15 February 1938 at Norfolk, Virginia
- Reclassified: USS Nokomis (PY-6)
- Stricken: 25 May 1938
- Identification: Official number 214877 (Note: Assigned in very brief period of civilian status.)
- Fate: Scrapped 22 June 1944, Mallows Bay, Maryland

General characteristics
- Type: Yacht
- Tonnage: 872 GRT
- Displacement: 1,265 tons
- Length: 243 ft (74.1 m); 203 ft (61.9 m) on waterline
- Beam: 31 ft 10 in (9.7 m)
- Draft: 12 ft 10 in (3.9 m)
- Depth of hold: 19 ft 6 in (5.9 m)
- Installed power: 2 Babcock & Wilcox boilers; electrical 110 V: 1x 17.5 kW, 1x 5 kW (both Carlisle—Finch) generator sets
- Propulsion: 2 triple expansion engines
- Speed: 16 kn (18 mph; 30 km/h) maximum; 16.7 kn (19.2 mph; 30.9 km/h) cruising
- Range: 1,517 nmi (1,746 mi; 2,809 km)
- Complement: Nokomis never operated fully crewed as yacht.; 103 Navy SP-609; 191 Navy PY-6
- Armament: Four 3-inch guns; Two machine guns

USS Nokomis (SP-609) was a yacht purchased by the U.S. Navy during World War I. The yacht was purchased from Horace E. Dodge of Detroit, Michigan, after he had the yacht luxuriously fitted out but before he could make use of his second Nokomis — the first having already gone into service.

She was outfitted as a patrol craft with 3-inch guns, and assigned to protect commercial shipping in the North Atlantic Ocean from German submarines and Q-ships. Post-war she was returned to the U.S. and decommissioned. Subsequently, she was placed back into service as a Navy survey vessel, a role she maintained for nearly two decades before again being decommissioned and struck from the Navy List in 1938.

The vessel was loaned to the Coast Guard, which assigned the name Bodkin, and was undergoing conversion to a sub chaser in 1943 until the submarine threat lessened and the conversion was stopped. The hulk was towed to Mallows Bay on Maryland's shore of the Potomac River and scrapped in June 1944. The former Nokomis was the only warship among the hulks of burned and salvaged World War I commercial vessels at the "graveyard" and the last to be scrapped there.

== Yacht ==
Nokomis II was a steam yacht designed by Henry J. Gielow of Gielow & Orr built as hull 360 by Pusey & Jones, Wilmington, Delaware for Horace E. Dodge of Detroit, Michigan launched 27 December 1916. (Note: Usually seen as just the "new" or "second" Nakomis or just Nakomis in contemporary industry and news reports.) Trials took place 28 April 1917. Though purchased by the Navy before significant operation as a private yacht the vessel was briefly assigned the official number 214877.

=== Confusion with Nokomis (1914) ===
This was the second yacht of the name and the second designed by Gielow for Dodge. The first Nokomis (1914), frequently confused with the second, was 303 GRT, 180 ft (54.9 m) length overall, 154 ft 5 in (47.1 m) length between perpendiculars, with official number 212143 and signal letters LDKQ and built by Robins Dry Dock and Repair Company, Brooklyn, New York. The first Nokomis was purchased by the Navy for $140,000 from Dodge and delivered to the Navy on 9 May 1917. This vessel was USS Kwasind (S. P. 1233).

It is not unusual to see the 1914 build date associated with the specific characteristics of the 1916 Nokomis II. (Note: Previous versions of this article and a few otherwise reliable references clearly describe the larger 1916 yacht in dimensions and activities yet have the 1914 date.) This is compounded by the fact that the unique official number, 214877 in the case of Nokomis II, usually for the entire lifetime of a vessel, through name and ownership changes, "died" with naval service. Confusion may be aided by the fact the Navy, Dictionary of American Naval Fighting Ships for example, refers to the yacht Nokomis II as the Navy's Nokomis I. The first Nokomis was still in the register as Dupont, owned by the state or Maryland, as late as 1961.

=== Construction ===
Nokomis II was fitted out with special interior design for each space in luxurious style and accepted by Dodge in June 1917. Dodge had specified that the new yacht be fully sea going and incorporate the latest naval architecture and design as well as that all the interior decor and furnishings be specially designed to artistically harmonize without being ornate. The yacht was acquired by the Navy before completion and the only chance Dodge had to sail Nokomis was to deliver the vessel to the Navy. (Note: It is worth noting that the photo feature and text in the referenced July issue of The Rudder with the article "Nokomis A Floating Palace" was being published even as the Navy was likely stripping the yacht of its luxury for naval service.)

The as built specifications closely match the Navy's in the 1918 document that is the basis for many listed in "General Characteristics" with the additions of a waterline length of 203 ft (61.9 m) and depth of hold of 19 ft 6 in (5.9 m).

The yacht was flush decked with a steel hull. A steel deck house, 141 ft (43.0 m) in length and 7 ft 4 in (2.2 m) headroom, was covered by a shade deck above extending the width of the ship that provided a promenade. The forward portion of the deck house contained a pantry on the starboard side with staterooms for the stewards on the port side. Aft was an 18 ft (5.5 m) long, 20 ft (6.1 m) wide dining room extending to the machinery casing amidships. Flanking that casing to starboard was a vestibule to the main deck, toilet, and barber shop. Flanking to port were staterooms for engineers and a laundry. Aft of the boiler casing were the owner's stateroom and a 24 ft (7.3 m) by 20 ft (6.1 m) living room, with a vestibule from which stairs led below to guest's quarters, with a sheltered 42 ft (12.8 m) quarterdeck to the stern.

On the upper deck were two structures. The forward house, 28 ft (8.5 m) by 12 ft (3.7 m), contained the captain's quarters forward with a radio room and operator's quarters aft. Aft of the funnel was a 32 ft (9.8 m) by 12 ft (3.7 m) house with the forward 21 ft (6.4 m) containing a gymnasium and the remaining part aft a sitting room with sofa. From photographs the open bridge was atop the forward house.

On the berthing deck below the crew's quarters lay forward with crew's bath aft of the collision bulkhead and folding bunks in a 25 ft (7.6 m) space aft of the bathroom. Aft of the bunkroom were eleven staterooms and a wardroom for ship's officers occupying 26 ft (7.9 m) of length and full width of the vessel. Aft of the officers space were separate galleys, one for the crew and one for the owner. (Note: Since registration as yacht never made the register the designated number of crew can only be indicated by the description of the extent of quarters provided. It was obviously large with eleven below deck staterooms for officers, a stateroom for captain and radio operator on the top deck, engineer and steward staterooms on the main deck and the large bunk space.)

Babcock & Wilcox water tube type boilers provided steam with two triple expansion, three cylinder engines driving the twin screws. Steam also drove electrical generating sets. The equipment was designed so that either boiler could provide steam to either engine independently so that 80% of full speed could be maintained on either. Fuel capacity was 350 tons of coal carried in bunkers athwartship and alongside the boiler room. Ship's auxiliaries were electrical powered and forced air heating and cooling was available when natural ventilation was not desirable. A feature of the yacht was its seven boats. Those included a 35 ft (10.7 m) express launch, a 30 ft (9.1 m) service launch, two 21 ft (6.4 m) power launches, a power lifeboat and two regular lifeboats.

Dodge did not give up after losing his second and unused yacht to the Navy. A third, apparently initially adding to the Nokomis line of yachts, larger one designed by Gielow was being built in 1920 by the Great Lakes Engineering Works, Detroit; however, that vessel ended up being named Delphine (1921) instead of carrying on the tradition.

== World War I service ==
The yacht was purchased from Dodge 1 June 1917 for $510,000 retaining the civilian name to officially become the Navy's first Nokomis 19 November 1917. The ship was commissioned at Philadelphia, Pennsylvania, on 3 December 1917.

=== French escort duty ===
After fitting out at Philadelphia Nokomis sailed for Bermuda 19 December with a French submarine chaser JC 319' in tow. She departed Bermuda for Brest, France, 7 January 1918 at 7 am, stopping en route at the Azores and Leixões, Portugal. The expansion of U.S. Naval forces in France and increase in the escort duty in French waters resulted in Nokomis being among the smaller and slower vessels of less military value transferred to serve convoys using the Gironde River with a base in Rochefort, a French naval base north of the Gironde. Nokomis reported at Rochefort 11 March 1918. The five other former yachts withstood the constant escort duty well, but Nokomis is noted as an exception. Nokomis spent the rest of the conflict on patrol and escort duty off western France, and remained in European waters for several months after the November 1918 Armistice brought an end to the fighting and end of wartime duty in 1919. Aboard were some six African Americans, one cook and the others mess attendants, relegated to the role of servants in the segregated Navy.

Nokomis returned to the United States in August, was reclassified PY–6 in 1920, and decommissioned at New York City 25 February 1921. The yacht was outfitted as a ship's tender for the Naval Governor of Santo Domingo in July 1921 but did not assume this duty.

== Postwar Navy survey ship ==
On 26 March 1924, under command of Royal E. Ingersoll, Nokomis was fitted out as a survey ship and surveyed in the Cuban–Haitian area, making new charts of the north coast of Cuba. The coastline was determined largely by aerial photography, taken by an amphibian Loening OL-2, in the first extensive use of aircraft in surveying. Under direction of the Hydrographic Office she conducted surveys in Mexican and Caribbean waters. Benjamin Dutton, Jr., an expert in navigation who had two Navy survey ships named in his honor, was in command during a part of this period. (Note: The two ships were USS Dutton (AGS-8) and USNS Dutton (T-AGS-22).)

During 1935 in a cooperative effort with Instituto Geografico de Colombia Nokomis surveyed Cartagena Bay .

Nokomis decommissioned 15 February 1938 and was struck from the Navy Register 25 May 1938.

== Fate ==
The Navy loaned the former naval vessel to the United States Coast Guard in 1943 which assigned the name Bodkin. The vessel was undergoing conversion at the Coast Guard Yard at Curtis Creek, Maryland into a submarine chaser. Work was suspended, after $150,000 in costs, due to lessening of the submarine threat. Bethlehem Steel Company was directed to salvage the metals that could be remelted and the hulk was taken to Mallows Bay to be the only warship among the many World War I hulks there. On 22 June 1944 Bethlehem scrapped the hulk as one of the last operations at the bay.

== Sources ==
- Construction & Repair Bureau (Navy) (November 1, 1918). Ships' Data U.S. Naval Vessels. Washington D.C.: U.S. Government Printing Office. pp. 296–301.
- DANFS. "Nokomis I (S. P. 609)". Dictionary of American Naval Fighting Ships. Naval History And Heritage Command.
