= Auto-Ordnance Corporation =

Firearms history

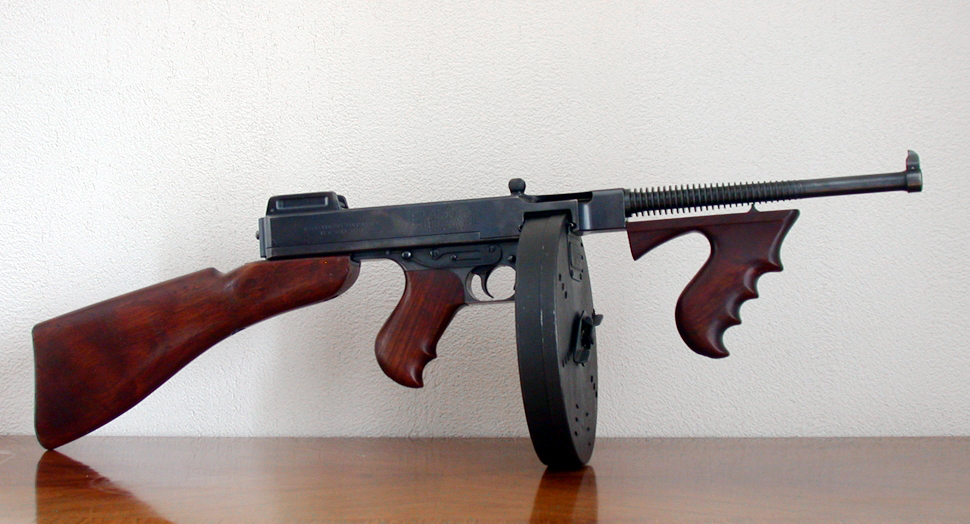
Thompson Model 1921 with Type C 100-round drum magazine

Auto-Ordnance was a U.S. arms development firm founded by retired Colonel John T. Thompson of the United States Army Ordnance Department in 1916. Auto-Ordnance is best known for the Thompson submachine gun, used as a military weapon by the Allied forces in World War II, and also notorious as a gangster weapon used during the Roaring Twenties.

== Founding ==
Auto-Ordnance Corporation was created by John T. Thompson in August 1916 with the backing of investor Thomas Ryan. In 1915 Thompson had found the Blish Lock patent of Commander John Blish, which was the operating principle of the first prototypes of the Thompson submachine gun and the Thompson Autorifle. In exchange for shares of the newly founded company Blish agreed to give Thompson his patent. Thompson hired two design engineers Theodore H. Eickoff and Oscar V. Payne. The engineers learned that the Blish lock design, which was a delayed blowback action, was ineffective with the .30-06 rifle cartridge but very effective with the .45 ACP pistol round. The birth of the Thompson submachine gun took place when Thompson had the idea of a "trench sweeper" or "trench broom". The first short run production model was 1919, too late for use in World War I.

Thompson first showed the submachine gun design to the US government, but it became a gun for law enforcement before it was put to use in the military. The initial production of the Model 1921 was by Colt. After the Thompson submachine gun received the nickname "Tommy Gun" in the popular press, Thompson went to the trademark office to protect the nickname. A small run of M1928 and M1928A1 made by Savage Arms were stamped "TOMMY GUN".

== Prototypes ==
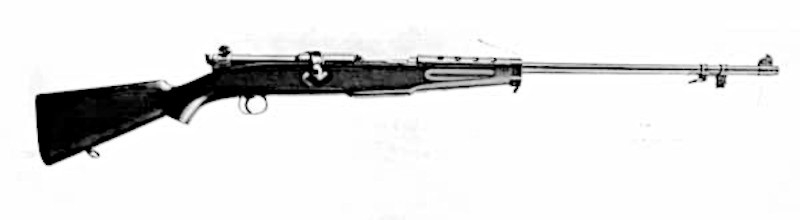
Thompson Autorifle prototype

Auto-Ordnance produced different prototypes for military rifle trials in the 1920s and for the .30 carbine trials in the early 1940s but these were not adopted by the military. Later during World War II, Auto-Ordnance established its own production plant in Bridgeport, Connecticut, and produced the M1928A1, M1 and M1A1 Thompsons to augment production by Savage Arms for the military. Auto-Ordnance also made parts for other military firearms as a subcontractor for other manufacturers in World War II.

The Thompson M1A1 was typically issued to tankers and others affiliated with vehicles, due to the weapon's heavy weight and short effective range. Later, it became popular for use in urban environments due to its short barrel making it easier to bring to target in a confined space than the M1 Garand, and in jungle warfare due to its volume of fire and stopping power.

== Owners ==
During the 1950s, the assets of the original Auto-Ordnance Corporation were acquired and operated by Numrich Arms Corporation (NAC, no relation to the original 1916 AOC). Numrich Arms Auto-Ordnance assembled limited numbers of Thompson submachine guns primarily for law enforcement from existing receivers found in the crates purchased in 1951, including M1928A1 and M1A1 models. Numrich also supplied parts for Thompson guns to law enforcement and gun collectors. In 1974, the Numrich incarnation of Auto-Ordnance made a few full auto Thompson submachine guns and numerous semi-automatic only replicas of the Thompson gun for the collectors' market, including .22 LR caliber.

Auto-Ordnance Corporation was bought out in 1999 by Saelio Enterprises Inc., parent company of Kahr Arms. Numrich Arms continued as Gun Parts Corporation. Kahr continues to make semi-automatic-only "Thompson Carbines" in .45 ACP. Although they appear identical to their selective-fire (full-auto) predecessors, unlike those the new production Thompsons fire from a closed bolt rather than the open bolt of the original Thompson design. Dimensional changes prevent installation of full-auto bolts and fire control groups in the semi-auto frames or receivers. Variations include the "Chicago Typewriter" 1927A-1 which resembles the Model 1921AC of the gangster era; the 1927A-1 "Commando" which resembles the early World War II Model 1928A1 Thompson with the Cutts Compensator; the TM1 which resembles the later World War II M1 Thompson with the side-mounted bolt handle; and a "Thompson pistol" that essentially is an M1928 without provision for mounting a buttstock. Kahr Auto-Ordnance also manufactures replicas of the U.S. World War II M1 carbine and M1911 pistol.
