= USNS Bowditch (T-AGS-21) =

Ship built in 1945

- Typical Victory Ship

History

United States
- Name: SS South Bend Victory
- Namesake: Nathaniel Bowditch
- Owner: War Shipping Administration
- Operator: Waterman Steamship Company for World War II
- Builder: Oregon Shipbuilding Corporation, Portland, Oregon
- Laid down: 11 May 1945
- Launched: 30 June 1945
- In service: 27 July 1945
- Out of service: 22 October 1953
- Fate: Transferred to the Navy, 2 August 1957

United States
- Name: USNS Bowditch
- Namesake: Nathaniel Bowditch
- Acquired: 2 August 1957
- In service: 8 October 1958
- Out of service: 1988
- Stricken: 4 March 1988
- Identification: IMO number: 7738450
- Fate: Sold for scrapping, 4 March 1988

General characteristics
- Type: Oceanographic survey ship
- Displacement: 4,420 long tons (4,491 t) light; 13,050 long tons (13,259 t) full
- Length: 455 ft (139 m)
- Beam: 62 ft (19 m)
- Draft: 23 ft (7.0 m)
- Propulsion: Cross compound steam turbine with double reduction gear, 6,000–8,500 hp (4.5–6.3 MW)
- Speed: 16 knots (30 km/h; 18 mph)
- Complement: 62 Merchant Marine and 28 US Naval Armed Guards, during WW2
- Armament: 1 × 5 inch (127 mm)/38 caliber gun; 1 × 3 inch (76 mm)/50 caliber gun; 8 × 20 mm Oerlikon as WW2 ship

USNS Bowditch (T-AGS-21) was the lead ship of her class of oceanographic survey ships for the United States Navy. Launched as the SS South Bend Victory in 1945, Maritime Commission hull number MCV 694, a type VC2-S-AP3 Victory ship, she was named for Nathaniel Bowditch, the second U.S. Navy vessel named in his honor. The ship was acquired by the Navy in August 1957 and converted to an AGS at Charleston Naval Shipyard. Named Bowditch on 8 August 1957 and placed in service 8 October 1958 for operation by the Military Sea Transportation Service (MSTS).

== SS South Bend Victory ==
SS South Bend Victory was a World War II era Victory ship. She was laid down on 11 May 1945 and delivered to the Maritime Commission on 30 June 1945. For World War II she was operated by the Waterman Steamship Company under the United States Merchant Marine act for the War Shipping Administration. She had United States Navy Armed Guard to man the deck guns. She was built under the Emergency Shipbuilding program under cognizance of the U.S. Maritime Commission.

== War Relief and Seacowboys ==
In 1946 after World War II the South Bend Victory was converted to a livestock ship, also called a cowboy ship. From 1945 to 1947 the United Nations Relief and Rehabilitation Administration and the Brethren Service Committee of the Church of the Brethren sent livestock to war-torn countries. These "seagoing cowboys" made about 360 trips on 73 different ships. The Heifers for Relief project was started by the Church of the Brethren in 1942; in 1953 this became Heifer International. The SS South Bend Victory was one of these ships, known as cowboy ships, as she moved livestock across the Atlantic Ocean. In the April and June of 1946 she took 780 horses, several thousand baby chicks and hay bales to Poland on each trip. South Bend Victory moved horses, heifers, and mules as well as some chicks, rabbits, and goats. She was operated by the Prudential Steamship Corporation from 1950 to 1953 for Korean War. In 1953 with her war work done she was laid up in the James River as part of the National Defense Reserve Fleet.

== U.S. Navy ==
The ship was acquired by the U.S. Navy from the National Defense Reserve Fleet in August 1957, renamed Bowditch, and converted to an Oceanographic Survey Ship (AGS) at the Charleston Naval Shipyard from 10 October 1957 to 30 September 1958.

== USNS Bowditch T-AGS-21 ==
USNS Bowditch T-AGS-21 was operated by the Military Sea Transportation Service (MSTS) for the U.S. Naval Oceanographic Office in the Ocean Survey Program (OSP) under direction of the U.S. Navy Office of Special Projects in support of the U.S. Navy Fleet Ballistic Missile Program. Three ships were converted for this purpose: Bowditch, and identical sister ships Dutton and Michelson.

Attached aboard Bowditch was a US Navy Oceanographic Detachment, upgraded ca. May 1966 to an Oceanographic Unit, of approximately 3 officers and 22 enlisted personnel, mostly technicians. Varying numbers of civilian scientists and engineers managed survey operations, and maintained certain navigation and sonar equipment, usually about 12 oceanographers from the Naval Oceanographic Office, some personnel from the Naval Applied Sciences Laboratory, and about 7 technical representatives from private corporations which included Sperry Corporation maker of the ships Gyroscope.

Bowditch was taken out of service in 1987 and laid up the National Defense Reserve Fleet at Beaumont. She was disposed of by MARAD exchange 4 March 1988 and scrapped in Kaohsiung.
