= .45 Remington–Thompson =

Experimental firearms cartridge

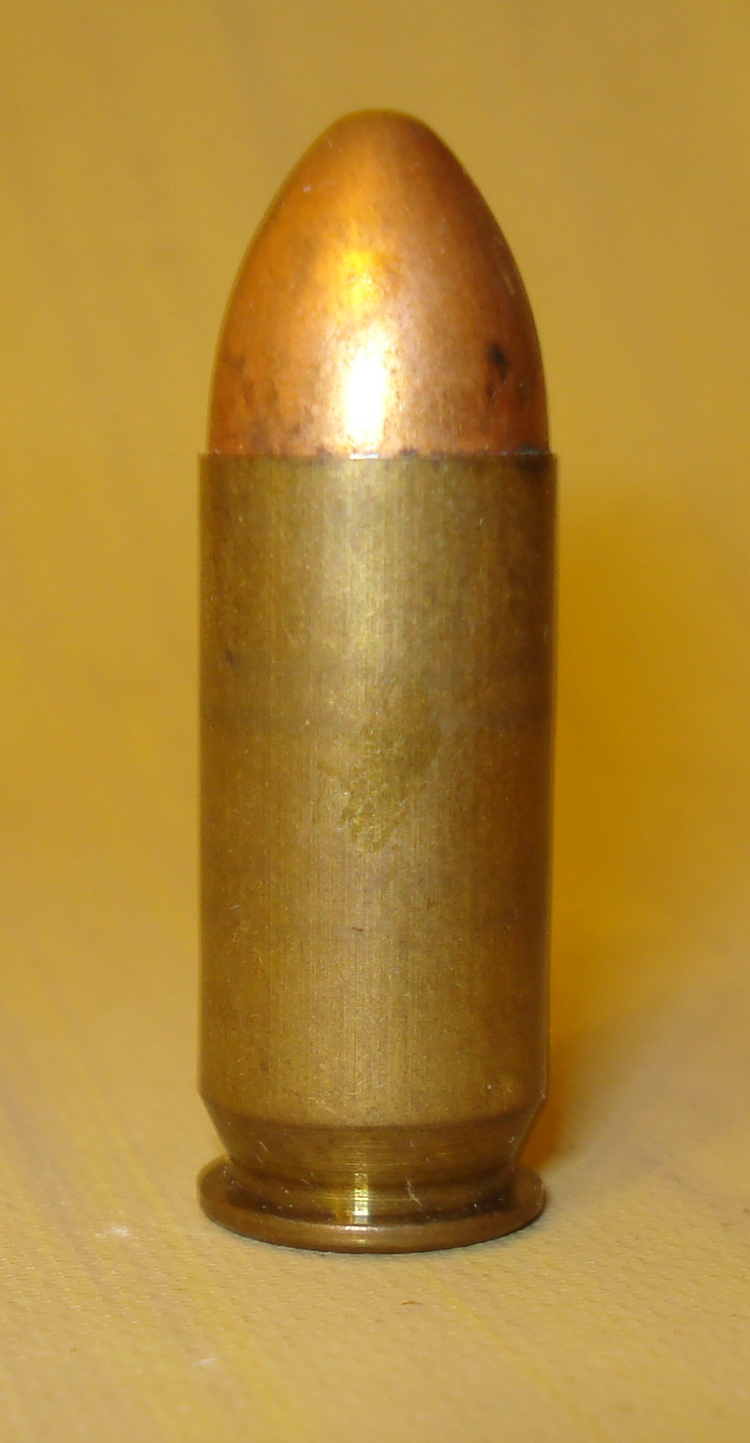
- .45 Long cartridge for the Thompson M1923 experimental SMG
- Place of origin: Experimental military round

Production history
- Designed: 1923

Specifications
- Parent case: .45 ACP
- Bullet diameter: .447 in (11.4 mm)
- Case length: 1 in (25 mm) (about 1/8 in (3.2 mm) longer than the .45 ACP)

Ballistic performance
Bullet mass/type	Velocity	Energy
250 gr	1,450 ft/s (440 m/s)	1,165 lb⋅ft (1,580 N⋅m)
- Test barrel length: 14 in (356 mm)

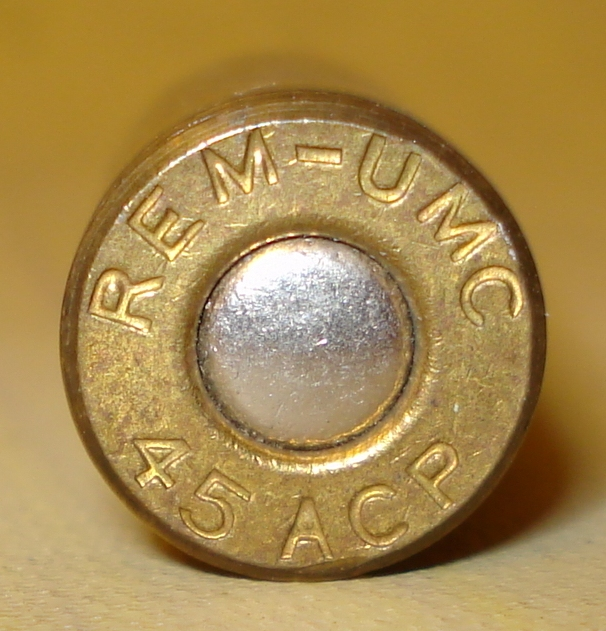
Headstamp for the .45 Remington-Thompson cartridge.

The .45 Remington–Thompson (11.4x25mm) was an experimental firearms cartridge designed by Remington Arms and Auto Ordnance for the Model 1923 Thompson submachine gun, a variant of the Model 1921 with a longer barrel, with the intent of increasing the power and range of the weapon. While some variants of the 1923 were produced, the rifle and round did not find commercial success.

== See also ==
- 12 mm caliber
- List of handgun cartridges
