= Thompson submachine gun =

American submachine gun

Thompson submachine gun, caliber .45
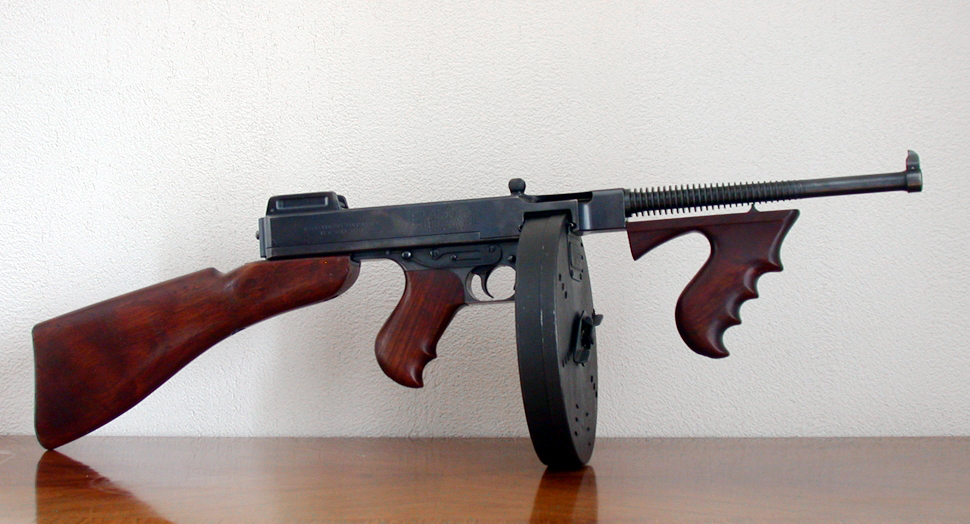
- Colt Model 1921A Thompson with a 100-round drum magazine
- Type: Submachine gun
- Place of origin: United States

Service history
- In service: 1921–present
- Used by: See § Users
- Wars: List of conflicts: West Virginia coal wars; Irish War of Independence; Irish Civil War; Second Honduran Civil War; 1924 Estonian coup d'état attempt; Basmachi Conflict; Banana Wars; Escobar Rebellion; Castellammarese War; Chaco War; Revolution of 1934; Spanish Civil War; World War II; Indonesian National Revolution; Hukbalahap Rebellion; Iran crisis of 1946; Chinese Civil War; First Indochina War; Greek Civil War; Indo-Pakistani War of 1947; 1948 Arab–Israeli War; Malayan Emergency; Korean War; 1958 Lebanon crisis; Cuban Revolution; Algerian War; Portuguese Colonial War; Vietnam War; Laotian Civil War; Cambodian Civil War; Bay of Pigs Invasion; Indonesia–Malaysia confrontation; Lebanese Civil War; The Troubles; Araguaia Guerrilla War; Turkish invasion of Cyprus; Nicaraguan Revolution; United States invasion of Panama; Somali Civil War; Yugoslav Wars; Iraq War; Russian invasion of Ukraine

Production history
- Designer: John T. Thompson
- Designed: 1917–1920
- Manufacturer: List of manufacturers: Auto-Ordnance Company (originally); The Birmingham Small Arms Company Limited; Colt; Savage Arms; RPB Industries
- Produced: 1921–1945
- No. built: Approximately 1.75 million of all variants, including: M1928A1: 562,511; M1: 285,480; M1A1: 539,143
- Variants: See § Variants

Specifications
- Mass: 10.8 lb (4.9 kg) empty (Thompson M1928A1); 10 lb (4.5 kg) empty (Thompson M1A1)
- Length: 33.7 in (860 mm) (M1928A1 with compensator); 31.9 in (810 mm) (M1/M1A1)
- Barrel length: 10.52 in (267 mm); 12 in (300 mm) (with Cutts compensator)
- Cartridge: .45 ACP (11.43×23mm); 10mm Auto (limited quantity of FBI conversions)
- Action: Blowback, Blish lock
- Rate of fire: 900 rpm (M1921); 600–725 rpm (M1928); 700–800 rpm (M1A1)
- Muzzle velocity: 935 ft/s (285 m/s)
- Effective firing range: 164 yards (150 m)
- Feed system: 20 or 30 round box magazine, 50 or 100 round drum magazine (M1 and M1A1 models do not accept drum magazines)

The Thompson submachine gun (also known as the "Tommy gun", "Chicago typewriter", or "trench broom") is a blowback-operated, selective-fire submachine gun invented and developed by Brigadier General John T. Thompson, a United States Army officer, in 1918. It was designed to break the stalemate of trench warfare of World War I, although early models did not arrive in time for actual combat. The Thompson saw early use by the United States Marine Corps during the Banana Wars, the United States Postal Inspection Service, the Irish Republican Army, and the Republic of China; the FBI, previously an unarmed agency, adopted their use following the 1933 Kansas City massacre.

The weapon was also sold to the general public. Because it was so widely used by criminals, the Thompson became notorious during the Prohibition era as the signature weapon of various organized crime syndicates in the United States in the 1920s. It was a common sight in the media at the time, and was used by both law enforcement officers and criminals. The Thompson was widely adopted by the U.S. armed forces during World War II, and was also used extensively by other Allied troops during the war. Its main models were designated as the M1928A1, M1, and M1A1 during this time. More than 1.5 million Thompson submachine guns were produced during World War II.

It is the first weapon to be labeled and marketed as a "submachine gun". The original selective-fire Thompson variants are no longer produced, although numerous semi-automatic civilian versions are still being produced by the manufacturer Auto-Ordnance. These models retain a similar appearance to the original models, but have various modifications in order to comply with US firearm laws.

== History and service ==
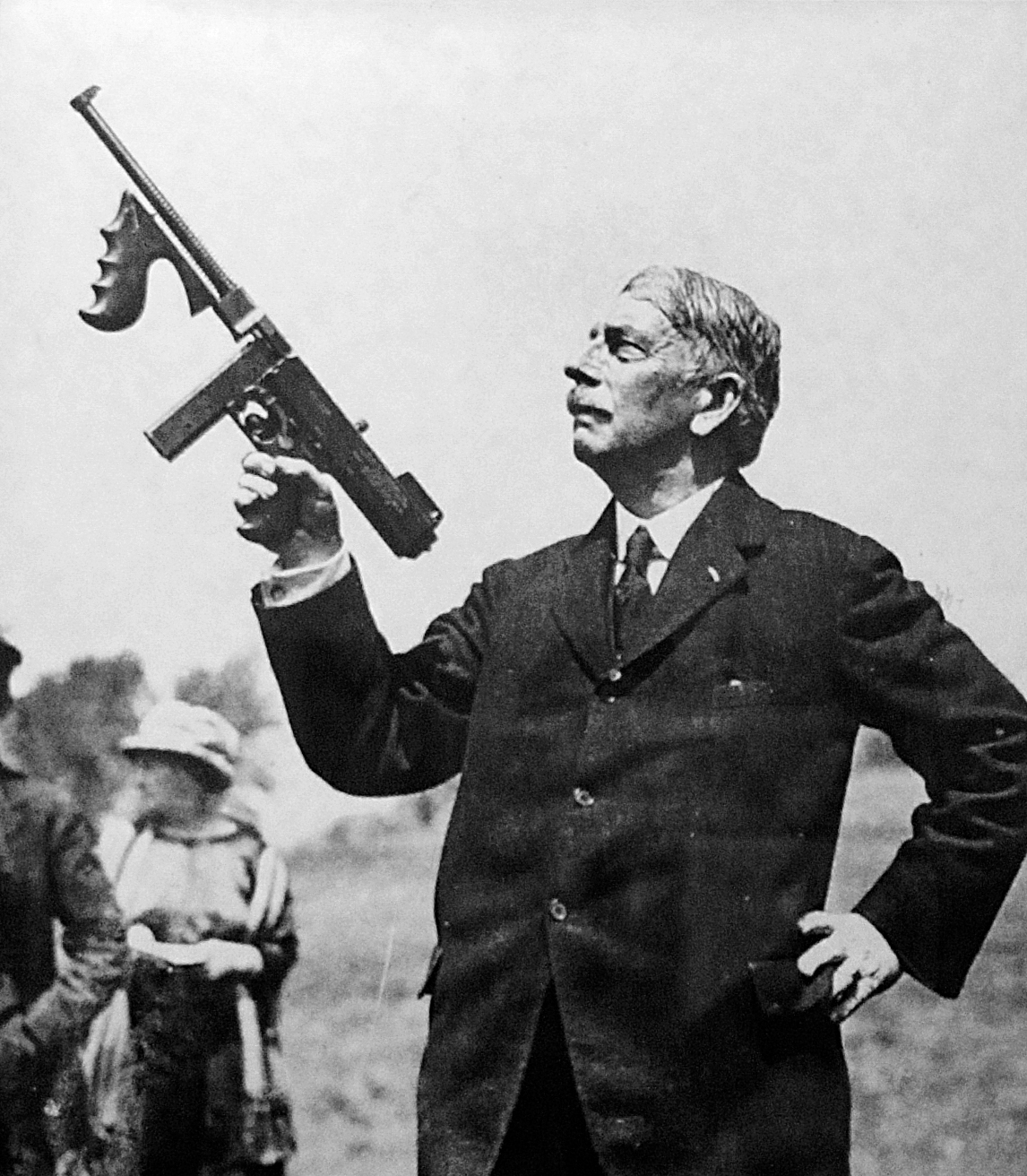
Brigadier General John T. Thompson holding a Model 1919 Thompson

=== Development ===
Brigadier General John T. Thompson, who spent most of his career in the ordnance department of the U.S. Army, was the original inventor and developer of the Thompson submachine gun. He envisioned it as a fully automatic rifle intended to replace the bolt-action service rifles then in use (such as the American M1903 Springfield).

Thompson came across a patent issued to the American inventor John Bell Blish in 1915, while searching for a way to allow his weapon to operate safely without the complexity of a recoil or gas-operated reloading mechanism. Blish's design (then known as the Blish lock) was based on the supposed adhesion of inclined metal surfaces under pressure. Thompson gained financial backing from the businessman Thomas F. Ryan and proceeded to found a company, which he named the Auto-Ordnance Company, in 1916, for the purpose of developing his new "auto rifle".

The Thompson was primarily developed in Cleveland, Ohio. Its principal designers were Theodore H. Eickhoff, Oscar V. Payne, and George E. Goll. By late 1917, the limits of the Blish lock were discovered (which is essentially an extreme manifestation of static friction), and, rather than the firearm working as a locked breech, the weapon was instead designed to function as a friction-delayed blowback action. It was found that the only cartridge then in service suitable for use with the new lock was the .45 ACP. General Thompson envisioned a "one-man, hand-held machine gun" chambered in .45 ACP to be used as a "trench broom" for the ongoing trench warfare of World War I. Oscar V. Payne designed the new firearm along with its stick and drum magazines. The project was titled "Annihilator I". Most of the design issues had been resolved by 1918; however, the war ended two days before prototypes could be shipped to Europe.

At an Auto-Ordnance board meeting in 1919, in order to discuss the marketing of the "Annihilator", with the war now over the weapon was officially renamed the "Thompson Submachine Gun". While other weapons had been developed shortly prior with similar objectives in mind, the Thompson was the first weapon to be labeled and marketed as a "submachine gun". Thompson intended for the weapon to provide a high volume of automatic, man-portable fire for use in trench warfare—a role for which the Browning Automatic Rifle (BAR) had been determined ill-suited. The concept had already been developed by German troops using their own Bergmann MP 18 (the world's first submachine gun) in concert with their Sturmtruppen tactics.

=== Early use ===
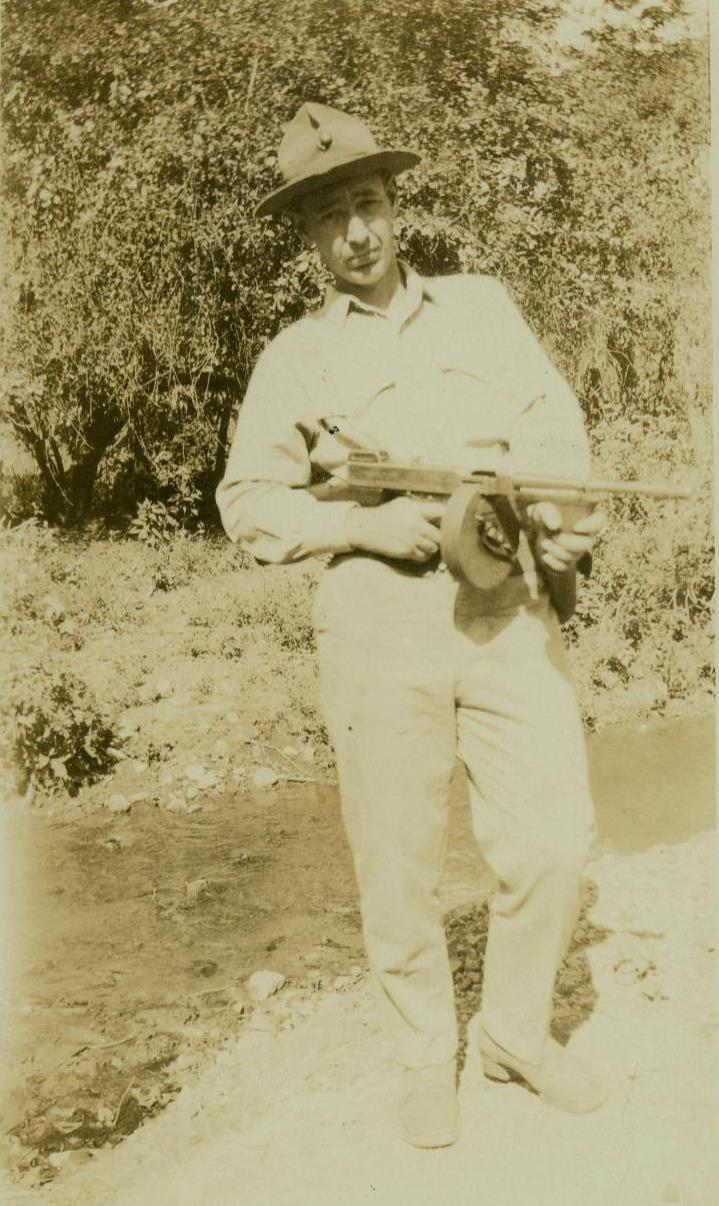
US Marine holding an M1928 Thompson during the Banana Wars

The first Thompson entered production as the Model of 1921. It was available to civilians, but, because of the weapon's high price, initially saw poor sales. The Thompson (with one Type XX 20 round "stick" magazine) had been priced at $200 in 1921 (roughly equivalent to $3,610 in 2025)

The major initial complaints concerning the Thompson were its cumbersome weight, its inaccuracy at ranges over 50 yards (46 m), and its lack of penetrating power using the .45 ACP cartridge.

The Thompson was first used in combat on 13 June 1921, when West Virginia state troopers fired on the mountainside near Lick Creek, where striking miners were firing at passing cars. By the time of the Battle of Blair Mountain, 37 had been acquired by the West Virginia state police and 56 were in the hands of coal companies and local law enforcement. The guns were also shipped to various hardware stores in the region.

Some of the first batches of Thompsons were bought (in America) by agents of the Irish Republican Army (notably the Irish gunman Harry Boland). The first test of the Thompson in Ireland was performed by Irish Republican Army unit commander Tom Barry, of the West Cork Brigade, in the presence of IRA leader Michael Collins. They purchased a total of 653 units, though US customs authorities in New York seized 495 of the units in June 1921. The remainder found their way to the Irish Republican Army by way of Liverpool, England, and were used in the last month of the Irish War of Independence (1919–1921). After a ceasefire called by the British in July 1921, the Irish Republican Army imported more units, which were used in the subsequent Irish Civil War (1922–1923). The Thompson was not found to be very effective in Ireland, having only caused serious casualties in 32 percent of the incidents in which it was used.

During the failed 1924 Estonian coup, Communists used Thompsons in an attempt to storm the Tallinn barracks; meanwhile the defenders used MP 18s. This was possibly the first engagement where submachine guns were used on both sides.

The Thompson achieved early notoriety in the hands of Prohibition and Great Depression-era gangsters and the lawmen who pursued them. It was also depicted in gangster films during this era, most notably regarding the Saint Valentine's Day Massacre. The Thompson guns used in the massacre are still being held by the Berrien County Sheriff's Department. The Thompson has been referred to by one researcher as the "gun that made the twenties roar".

Around 200 Model 1921 Thompsons were sold in 1926 to the United States Postal Inspection Service so they could protect the mail from a spate of robberies. These weapons were loaned to the United States Marine Corps which was, at that time, tasked with guarding mail shipments; this prompted the US Navy to formally test the Thompson. The Navy requested a reduction in the rate of fire. Auto-Ordnance complied, modifying the weapons by adding a substantial amount of mass to the actuator. In 1927 a number of Thompsons would be shipped to Marines in China and Nicaragua. The Navy subsequently ordered 500 guns, designated the Model of 1928.

The Thompson saw popularity as a point-defense weapon for countering ambushes by Nicaraguan guerrillas (in the Banana Wars) and led to the creation of four-man fire teams which had as much firepower as a nine-man rifle squad. Federal sales were then followed by sales to police departments in the US, as well as to various international armies and constabulary forces; chiefly in Central and South America.

In 1926, the Cutts compensator (a muzzle brake) was offered as an attachment option for the Thompson. Models with the compensator were cataloged as No. 21AC, at the original price of $200. The plain Thompson (without the attachment) was designated No. 21A at a reduced price of $175 (roughly equivalent to $3,180 in 2025).

In 1928, Federal Laboratories took over distribution of the weapon from Thompson's Auto-Ordnance Corporation. The new cost was listed as $225 per weapon (equivalent to $4,219 in 2025), with ammunition sold at $5 per 50-round drum and $3 per 20-round magazine.

Thompsons had also been widely used throughout China, where several Chinese warlords and their military factions running various parts of the fragmented country made purchases of the weapon, and subsequently produced many local copies.

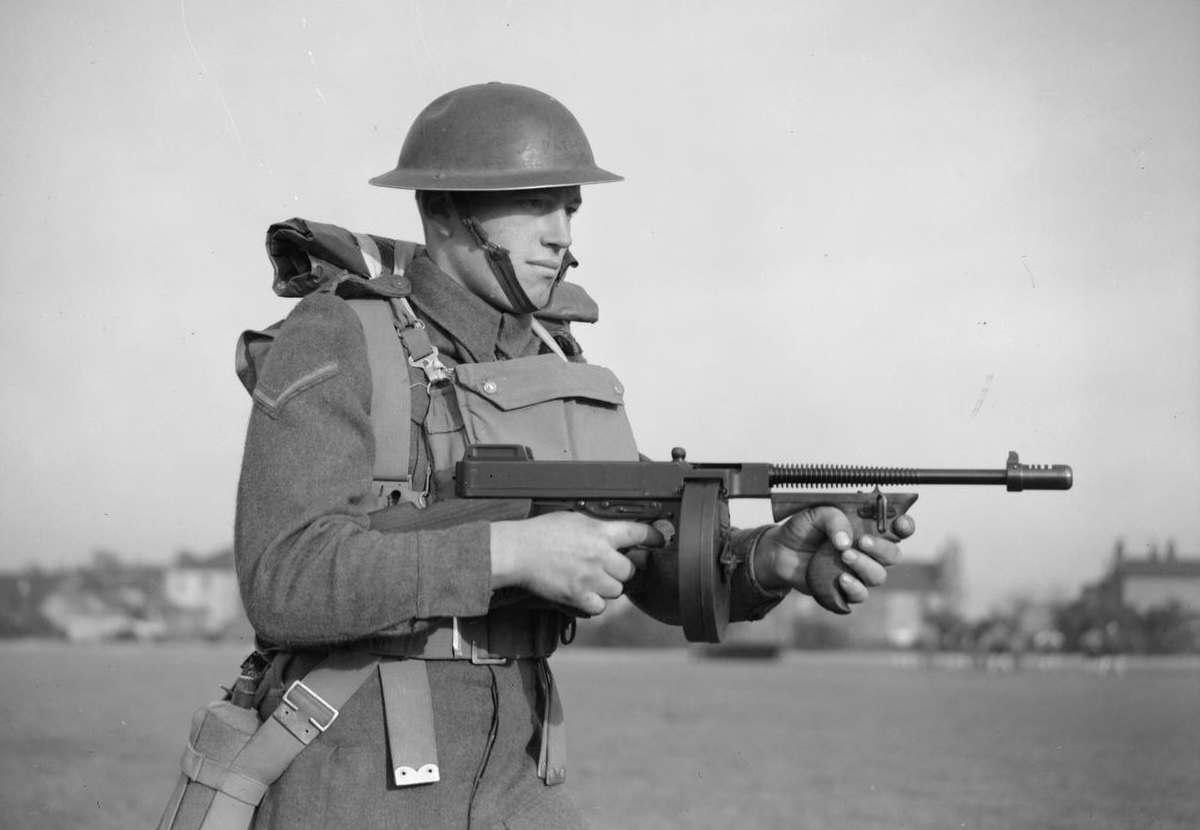
A British soldier equipped with a Thompson M1928 submachine gun in November 1940

Nationalist China acquired a substantial number of Thompson guns for use against Japanese land forces. They began producing copies of the Thompson in small quantities for use by their armies and militias. In the 1930s, Taiyuan Arsenal (a Chinese weapons manufacturer) produced copies of the Thompson for Yan Xishan, the then warlord of Shanxi province.

The FBI had also acquired Thompsons in 1933 following the Kansas City massacre.

A number of these guns were acquired by a construction company in Brazil, after construction of a federal road in Sergipe was disrupted by armed Cangaçeiros in December 1937 who violently opposed any attempts to build roads near their territory.

=== World War II ===
In 1938, the Thompson submachine gun was adopted by the U.S. military and was used during World War II.

There were two military types of Thompson submachine gun:

- The M1928A1, which had provisions for both box and drum magazines, utilized the Cutts muzzle brake, had cooling fins on the barrel, and employed a delayed blowback action with the charging handle on the top of the receiver.
- The M1 and M1A1, which had provisions for box magazines only, did not have cooling fins on the barrel, had a simplified rear sight, and employed a straight blowback action with the charging handle on the side of the receiver.

Over 1.5 million military Thompson submachine guns were produced during World War II.

==== Magazine developments ====
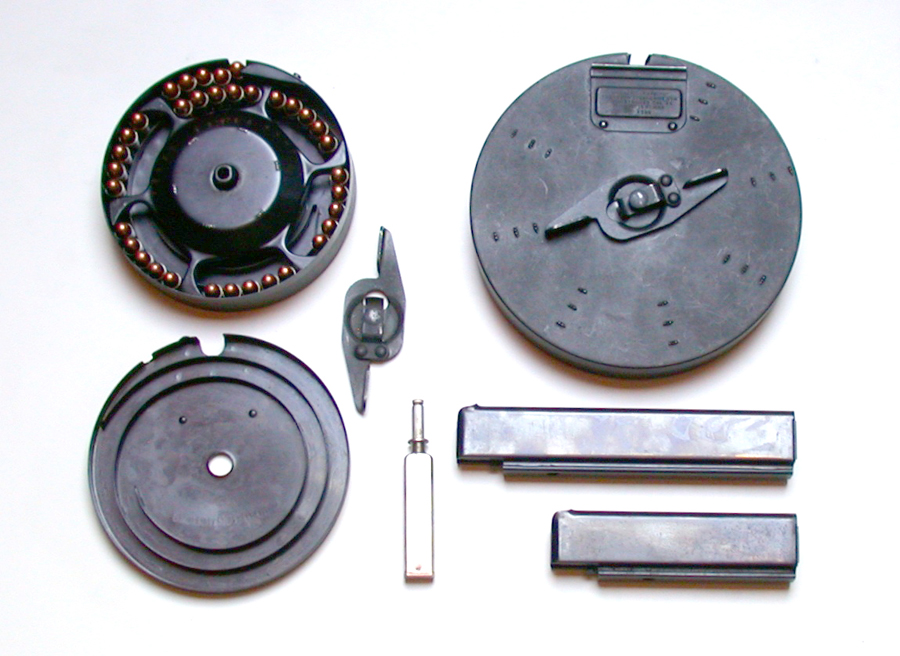
Drum and box magazines

Military users of the M1928A1 units had complaints of the "L" 50-round drum magazine. The British Army criticized "the [magazine's] excessive weight, [and] the rattling sound they made" and shipped thousands back to the U.S. in exchange for 20-round box magazines. The Thompson had to be cocked, bolt retracted, ready to fire, in order to attach the drum magazine. The drum magazine also attached and detached by sliding sideways, which made magazine changes slow and cumbersome. They also created difficulty when clearing a cartridge malfunction ("jam"). Reloading an empty drum with cartridges was a difficult and involved process in which the 50 rounds would be inserted and then the magazine wound up until a minimum of 9 to 11 loud "clicks" were heard before seating the magazine into the weapon.

In contrast, the "XX" twenty-round box magazine was light and compact. It tended not to rattle, and could be inserted with the bolt safely closed. The box magazine was quickly attached and detached, and was removed downward, making clearing jams easier. The box magazine tripped the bolt open lock when empty, facilitating magazine changes. An empty box was easy to reload with loose rounds. However, users complained that it was limited in capacity. In the field, some soldiers would tape two "XX" magazines together, in what would be known as "jungle style", to quicken magazine changes.

Two alternatives to the "L" 50-round drum and "XX" 20-round box magazines were tested 6 December 1941, at Fort Knox, Kentucky. An extended thirty-round box magazine and a forty-round magazine, which were made by welding two 20-round magazines face to face, jungle style, were tested. The testers considered both superior to either the "XX" box or "L" drum. The 30-round box was approved as the new standard in December 1941 to replace the "XX" and "L" magazines. (The concept of welding two box magazines face-to-face was also carried over to the M42 submachine gun.)

==== M1 development ====
The staff of Savage Arms looked for ways to simplify the M1928A1, and produced a prototype in February 1942, which was tested at Aberdeen Proving Ground in March 1942. Army Ordnance approved adoption (as the M1) in April 1942. M1s were made by Savage Arms and by Auto-Ordnance. M1s were issued with the 30-round box magazine and would accept the earlier 20-round box, but would not accept the drum magazine.

==== Combat use ====
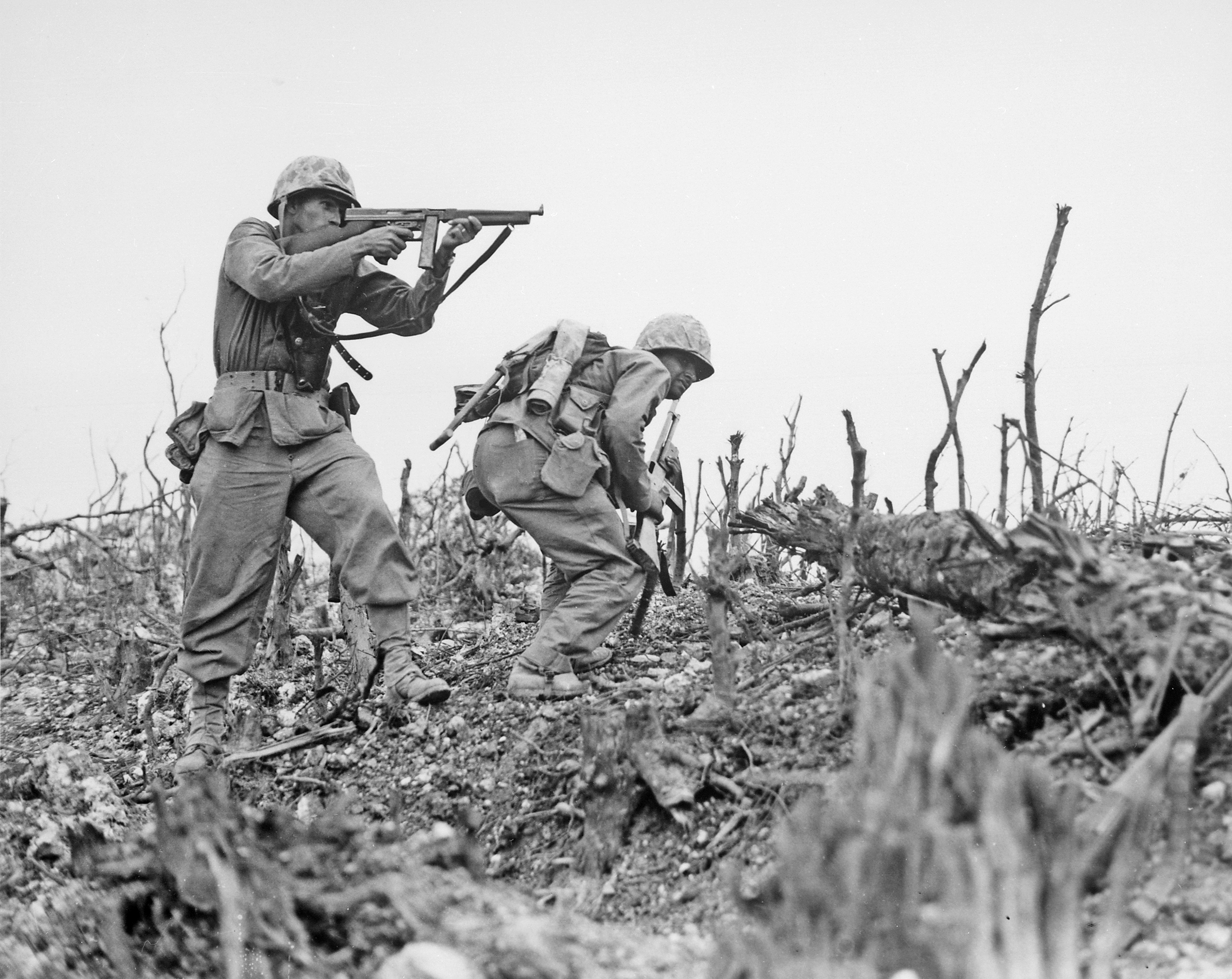
A U.S. Marine fires on a Japanese position using an M1 Thompson submachine gun during an advance on Okinawa in May 1945.

The Thompson was used in World War II in the hands of Allied troops as a weapon for scouts, non-commissioned officers (corporal, sergeant, and higher), and patrol leaders, as well as commissioned officers, tank crewmen, and soldiers performing raids on German positions. In the European theater, the gun was widely utilized in British and Canadian commando units, as well as in the U.S. Army paratrooper and Ranger battalions, where it was issued more frequently than in line infantry units because of its high rate of fire and its stopping power, which made it very effective in the kinds of close combat these special operations troops were expected to undertake. Military Police were fond of it, as were paratroopers, who "borrowed" Thompsons from members of mortar squads for use on patrols behind enemy lines. The gun was prized by those lucky enough to get one and proved itself in the close street fighting that was encountered frequently during the invasion of France. A Swedish variant of the M1928A1, the Kulsprutepistol m/40 (machine pistol, model 40), served in the Swedish Army between 1940 and 1951. Through Lend-Lease, the Soviet Union also received the Thompson, but due to a shortage of appropriate ammunition, its use was not widespread.

In the Malayan campaign, the Burma campaign, and the Pacific theater, Lend-Lease-issue Thompsons were used by the British Army, Indian Army, Australian Army, and other Commonwealth forces. They used the Thompson extensively in jungle patrols and ambushes, where it was prized for its firepower, though it was criticized for its hefty weight and poor reliability. In New Guinea, the Thompson was the only submachine gun available to the Australian Army for most of the vital Kokoda Track campaign in 1942. It became so prized that soldiers routinely picked up Thompson guns dropped by killed or wounded comrades. However, the weight of the ammunition and difficulties in supply eventually led to its replacement in Australian Army units in 1943 by Australian-made submachine guns, the Owen and Austen. Thompsons were also given to the Royal Australian Air Force and Royal Australian Navy.

In Burma and India, British forces largely replaced the Thompson with the Sten gun. New Zealand commando forces in the South Pacific campaign initially used Thompsons but switched them for the more reliable, lighter, and more accurate Owen during the Solomon Islands and Guadalcanal campaigns. The U.S. Marines also used the Thompson as a limited-issue weapon, especially during their later island assaults. The Thompson was soon found to have limited effect in heavy jungle cover, where the low-velocity .45 bullet would not penetrate most small-diameter trees or protective armor vests. (In 1923, the Army had rejected the .45 Remington–Thompson, which had twice the energy of the .45 ACP.) In the U.S. Army, many Pacific War jungle patrols were originally equipped with Thompsons in the early phases of the New Guinea and Guadalcanal campaigns, but soon began employing the Browning Automatic Rifle in its place as a point defense weapon.

The Army introduced the U.S. M3 and M3A1 submachine guns in 1943 with plans to produce the latter in numbers sufficient to cancel future orders for the Thompson, while gradually withdrawing it from first-line service. However, due to unforeseen production delays and requests for modifications, the M3/M3A1 never replaced the Thompson, and purchases continued until February 1944. Though the M3 was considerably cheaper to produce, at the end of World War II, the Thompson, with a total wartime production of over 1.5 million, outnumbered the M3/M3A1 submachine guns in service by nearly three to one.

=== After World War II ===
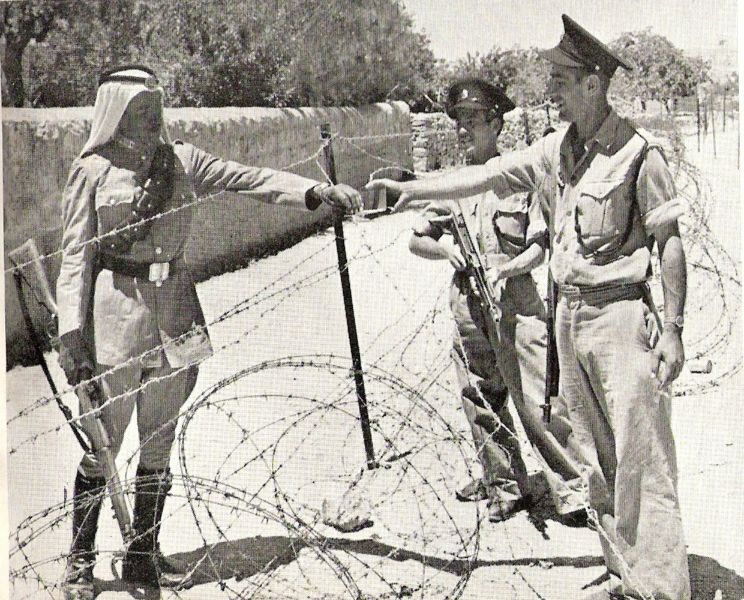
Two Israeli policemen armed with Thompsons meet a Jordanian legionnaire near the Mandelbaum Gate c. 1950

Thompson submachine guns were used by both sides during the 1948 Arab-Israeli war. Following the war, Thompsons were issued to members of Israel's elite Unit 101, upon the formation of that unit in 1953.

During the Greek Civil War, the Thompson submachine gun was used by both sides. The Hellenic Armed Forces, gendarmerie and police units were equipped with Thompson submachine guns supplied by the British and later in the war by the United States. The opposing Communist fighters of the Democratic Army of Greece were also using Thompson submachine guns, either captured from government forces or inherited from ELAS. ELAS was the strongest of the resistance forces during the period of Greek Resistance against the Germans and Italians and were supplied with arms from both the British and the United States. After the demobilization of ELAS, an unspecified number of arms were not surrendered to the government but kept hidden and were later used by the Democratic Army of Greece.

The Thompson also found service with the KNIL and the Netherlands Marine Corps during their attempt to retake their former colony of Indonesia. The gun was used by Indonesian infiltrators during the 1965 Indonesia–Malaysia confrontation.

In the First Indochina War, the Viet Minh used M1A1 Thompsons captured from the French and Bao Dai army. In addition, the Viet Minh used a Chinese copy of the Thompson (Type 36).

By the time of the Korean War in 1950, the Thompson had seen much use by the U.S. and South Korean military, even though the Thompson had been replaced as standard-issue by the M3/M3A1. With huge numbers of guns available in army ordnance arsenals, the Thompson remained classed as Limited Standard or Substitute Standard long after the standardization of the M3/M3A1. Many Thompsons were distributed to the US-backed Nationalist Chinese armed forces as military aid before the fall of Chiang Kai-shek's government to Mao Zedong's communist forces at the end of the Chinese Civil War in 1949 (Thompsons had already been widely used throughout China since the 1920s, at a time when several Chinese warlords and their military factions running various parts of the fragmented country made purchases of the weapon and then subsequently produced many local copies). During the Korean War, US troops were surprised to encounter communist Chinese troops armed with Thompsons (amongst other captured US-made Nationalist Chinese and American firearms), especially during unexpected night-time assaults which became a prominent Chinese combat tactic in the conflict. The gun's ability to deliver large quantities of short-range automatic assault fire proved very useful in both defense and assault during the early part of the war when it was constantly mobile and shifting back and forth. Many Chinese Thompsons were captured and placed into service with American soldiers and marines for the remaining period of the war.

The Yugoslav Army received 34,000 M1A1 Thompsons during the 1950s as part of a US Military Aid to Yugoslavia Agreement. These guns were used during the Yugoslav Wars in the 1990s.

During the Cuban Revolution, the Thompson submachine gun was used by both Batista's army and Fidel Castro's guerrillas. Both the latter and the Brigade 2506 also used some during the Bay of Pigs Invasion.

During the Vietnam War, some South Vietnamese army units and defense militia were armed with Thompson submachine guns, and a few of these weapons were used by reconnaissance units, advisors, and other American troops. It was partially replaced by the MAC-10, albeit during Vietnam, the fully automatic fire provided by the M16 made the Thompson less effective than it previously had been. Still, not only did some U.S. soldiers have use of them in Vietnam, they encountered them as well. The Viet Cong liked the weapon and used both captured models as well as manufacturing their own copies in small jungle workshops.

The Australian government destroyed most of their Thompson machine carbines in the 1960s. They shipped their remaining stocks to arm the forces of Lon Nol's Khmer Republic in 1975. They were then captured and used by the Khmer Rouge.

During the Troubles (1969–1998), the Thompson was again used by the Irish Republican paramilitaries. According to historian Peter Hart, "The Thompson remained a key part of both the Official IRA and Provisional IRA arsenals until well into the 1970s when it was superseded by the Armalite and the AK-47."

The Thompson was also used by U.S. and overseas law enforcement and police forces, most prominently by the FBI. The FBI used Thompsons until they were declared obsolete and ordered destroyed in the early 1970s.

== Collector interest ==
Because of their quality and craftsmanship, as well as their gangster-era and WWII connections, Thompsons are sought as collector's items. There were fewer than 40 pre-production prototypes. The Colt Patent Fire Arms Manufacturing Company in Hartford, Connecticut, was contracted by the Auto-Ordnance Corporation to manufacture the initial mass production of 15,000 Thompson Submachine Guns in 1920. For WWII, approximately 1,700,000 Thompson Submachine Guns were produced by Auto-Ordnance and Savage Arms, with 1,387,134 being the simplified World War II M1 and M1A1 variants (without the Blish lock and oiling system).

A Model 1921A believed to have been owned by Bonnie and Clyde, but without historical documentation to substantiate this provenance, sold at auction on 21 January 2012, in Kansas City for $130,000.

As of 2024, original Colt Model 1921 A or AC, Model 1927 A or AC, and Model 1928 Navy A or AC machine guns have sold for $25,000 to $45,000+.

== Features ==
=== Operating characteristics ===
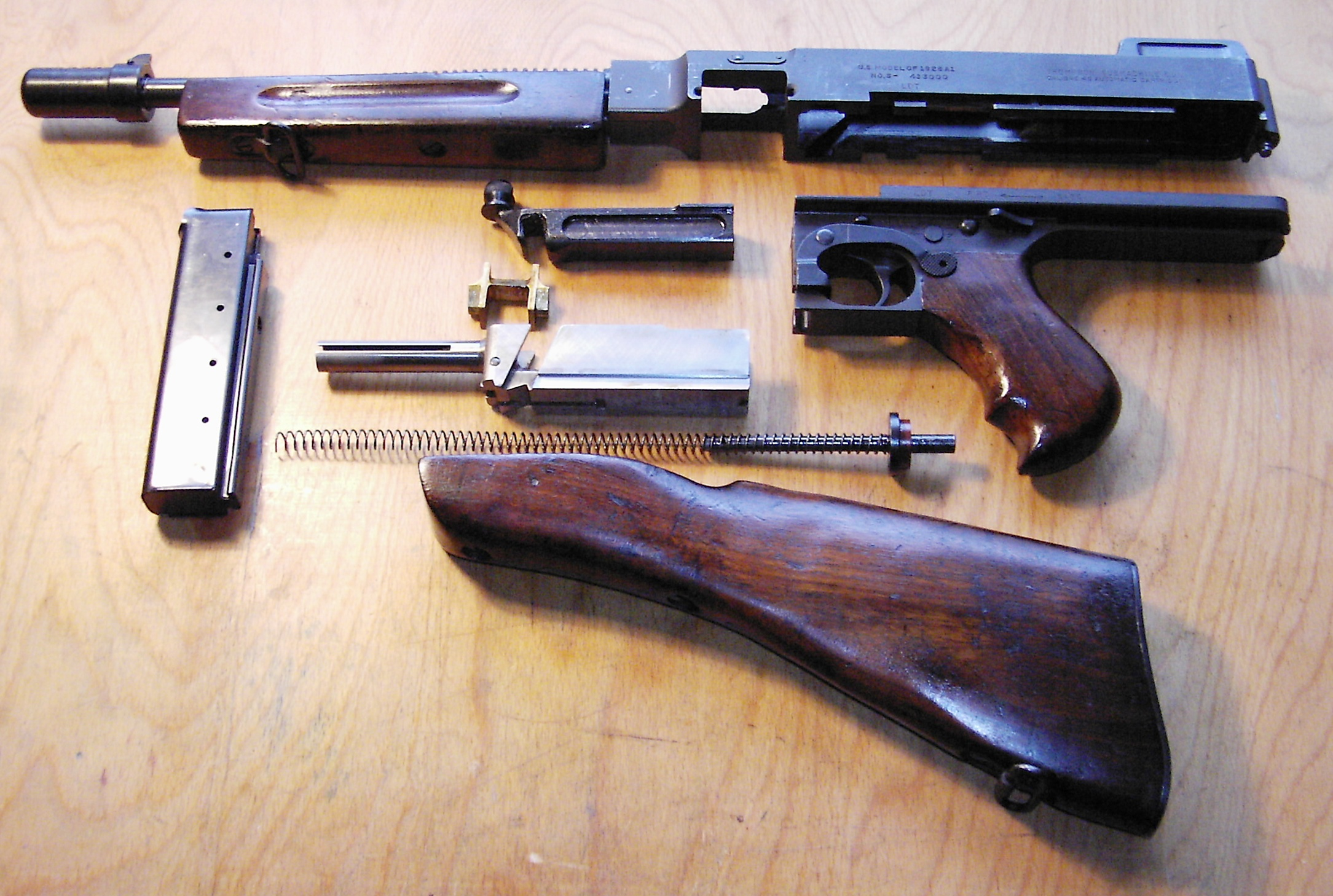
Thompson M1928A1, field stripped

Early versions of the Thompson, the Model 1919, had a fairly high cyclic rate of fire, as high as 1,200 rounds per minute (rpm), with most Model 1921s at 800 rpm. This rate of fire, combined with a rather heavy trigger pull and a stock with an excessive drop, increases the tendency for the barrel to climb off target in automatic fire. In 1927, the U.S. Navy ordered 500 Thompsons but requested a lower rate of fire. Thompson requested that Payne develop a method of reducing the cyclic rate of fire. Payne then replaced the actuator with a heavier one, and replaced the recoil spring with a stiffer one; the changes reduced the rate of fire from 800 to the 600 rpm of the U.S. Navy Model 1928. Later M1 and M1A1 Thompsons averaged also 600 rpm. Compared to more modern submachine guns, the Thompson is quite heavy, weighing roughly the same as the contemporary M1 Garand semi-automatic rifle, and requires a lot of cleaning. This was one of the major complaints about the weapon by U.S. Army personnel to whom it was issued.

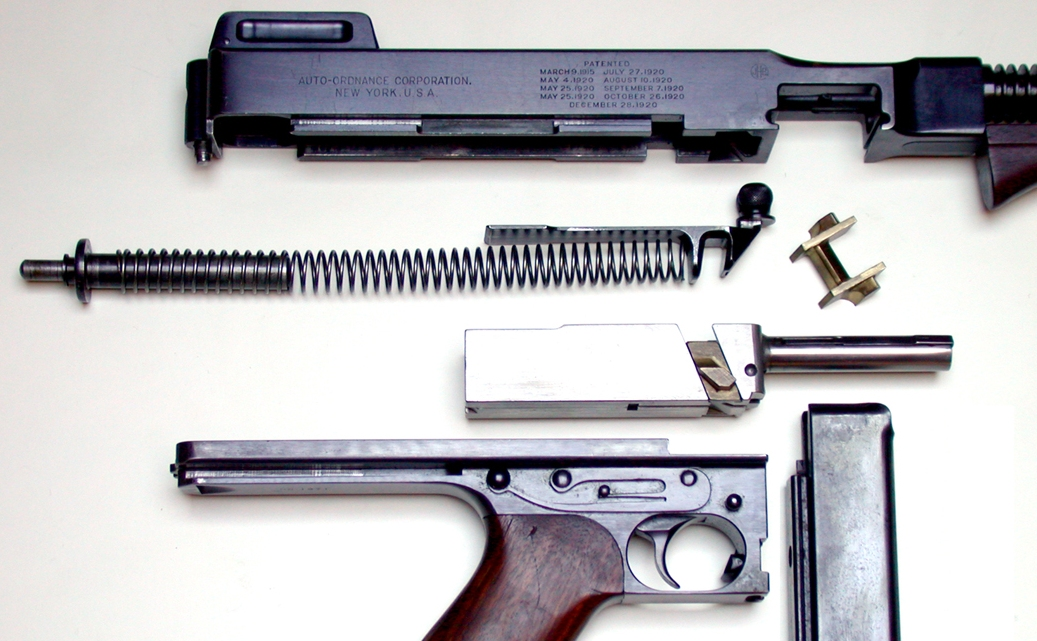
Thompson 1921, field stripped

Although the drum magazine provided significant firepower, in military service it was found to be overly heavy and bulky, especially when slung on the shoulder while marching. The M1928A1 Thompson drum magazine was rather fragile, and cartridges tended to rattle inside it, producing unwanted noise. For these reasons, the 20-round and later 30-round box magazines soon proved most popular with military users of the M1928A1, and drum compatibility was not included in the design of the wartime M1 and M1A1 models. The Thompson was one of the earliest submachine guns to incorporate a double-column, staggered-feed box magazine design, which undoubtedly contributed to the gun's reputation for reliability. In addition, the gun performed better than most after exposure to rain, dirt, and mud.

The selective-fire (semi or fully automatic) Thompson fires from the "open bolt" position, in which the bolt is held fully to rearward by the sear when cocked. When the trigger is depressed, the bolt is released, traveling forward to chamber and simultaneously fire the first and subsequent rounds until either the trigger is released or the ammunition is exhausted. This eliminates the risk of "cook-off", which can sometimes occur in closed-bolt automatic weapons.

== Variants ==
=== Prototypes ===
==== Model 1919 ====
Starting with the Serial no. 11, the Model 1919 takes the final appearance of the later Thompsons with the rear sights and butt stock. The Model 1919 was limited to about 40 units; the first built did not use the drums, as it was too difficult to fire. Many variations have been noted within this model. The weapons had very high cyclic rates up to 1,500 rpm. This was the weapon Brigadier General Thompson demonstrated at Camp Perry in 1920. A number of Model 1919s were made without butt stocks, rear and front sights, but the final version closely resembled the later Model 1921. This model was designed to "sweep" trenches with bullets. The New York City Police Department was the largest purchaser of the M1919. Some experimental calibers aside from the standard .45 ACP (11.4x23mm) were the .22LR, .32 ACP, .38 ACP, and 9mm.

==== .351 WSL variant ====
Only one prototype was made in .351 WSL using a standard 20" barrel which had a ROF of 1000rpm. In 1926, it was shipped to France for testing but the extractor broke after 10 rounds, no spare parts were delivered.

==== Thompson .30 Carbine ====
The layout and ergonomics of the Thompson submachine gun were also considered for the role of a Light Rifle before the adoption of the M1 Carbine. An example known as the "Calibre .30 Short Rifle" was based on the M1921/27 variants. However, it was turned down without testing due to logistical problems.

==== .30-06 variant ====
A .30–06 variant was intended as a rival to the M1918 BAR. It had an extended receiver with a recoil buffer and was fed from 20-round magazines.

==== M1944 Hyde Carbine ====
A .30 Carbine variant.

=== Production ===
==== Model 1921 ====
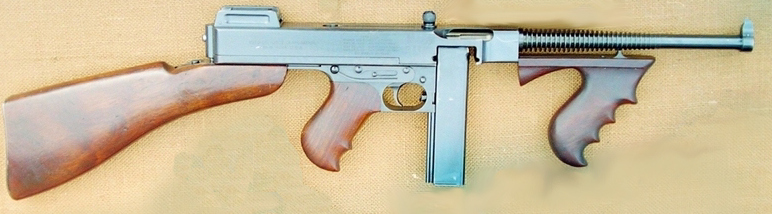
Thompson Model 1921

The Model 1921 (M1921) was the first major production model. Fifteen thousand were produced by Colt for Auto-Ordnance. In its original design, it was finished more like a sporting weapon, with an adjustable rear sight, a blued, finned barrel and vertical foregrip (or pistol grip) and the Blish lock. The M1921 was quite expensive to manufacture, with the original retail price around $200, because of its high-quality wood furniture and finely machined parts. The M1921 was famous throughout its career with police and criminals and in motion pictures. This model gained fame from its use by criminals during Prohibition, and was nicknamed "Tommy gun" by the media.

==== Model 1923 ====
The Model 1923 was a heavy submachine gun introduced to potentially expand the Auto-Ordnance product line and was demonstrated for the U.S. Army. It fired the more powerful .45 Remington–Thompson cartridge which fired a heavier 250 gr (0.57 oz; 16 g) bullet at muzzle velocities of about 1,450 ft/s (440 m/s) and energy about 1,170 ft⋅lb (1,590 J), with greater range than the .45 ACP. It introduced a horizontal forearm, improved inline stock for accuracy, 14 in (36 cm) barrel, bipod, and bayonet lug. The M1923 was intended to rival the M1918 Browning Automatic Rifle (BAR), with which the Army was already satisfied. The Army did not give the Model 1923 much consideration, so it was not adopted. In addition to the .45 Remington–Thompson, the M1923 Thompsons were to be made available to prospective buyers in several calibers, including .45 ACP, 9mm Parabellum, 9mm Mauser, and .351 Winchester Self-loading.

==== Model 1921AC (1926) ====
While not a new model in the usual sense of incorporating major changes, in 1926 the Cutts Compensator (a muzzle brake) was offered as an option for the M1921; Thompsons with the compensator were cataloged as No. 21AC at the original price of $200.00, with the plain M1921 designated No. 21A at a reduced price of $175.00. The Model 1921 was thereafter referred to as Model 1921A or Model 1921AC, though some collectors still refer to it as the Model 1921.

==== Model 1928 ====
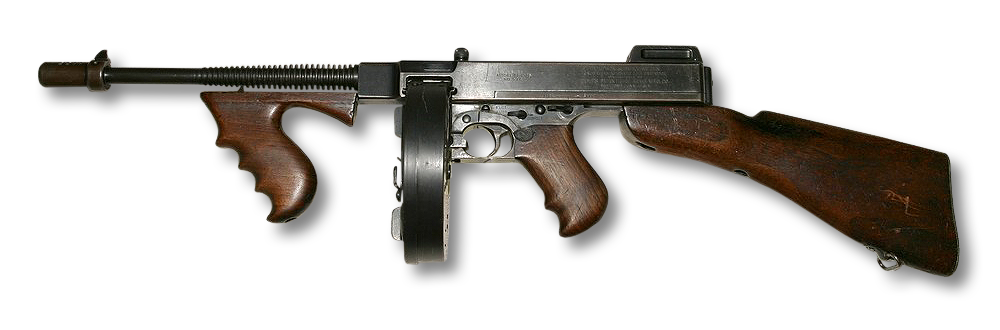
M1928 Thompson submachine gun.

The Thompson Model 1928 (or Thompson M1928) was the first type widely used by military forces, with the U.S. Navy and U.S. Marine Corps as major buyers through the 1930s. The original Model 1928s were Model 1921s with weight added to the actuator, which slowed down the cyclic rate of fire, a United States Navy requirement. On these guns, the model number "1921" on the receiver was updated by stamping an "8" over the last "1". The Navy Model 1928 has several names among collectors: the "Colt Overstamp", "1921 Overstamp", "28 Navy", or just "28N".

The Thompson Model 1928 would be the last small arm adopted by the U.S. Army that used a year designation in the official nomenclature. With the start of World War II, major contracts from several countries saved the manufacturer from bankruptcy. A notable variant of the Model 1928 with an aluminum receiver and tenite grip, buttstock, and forend, was made by Savage.

==== M1928A1 ====
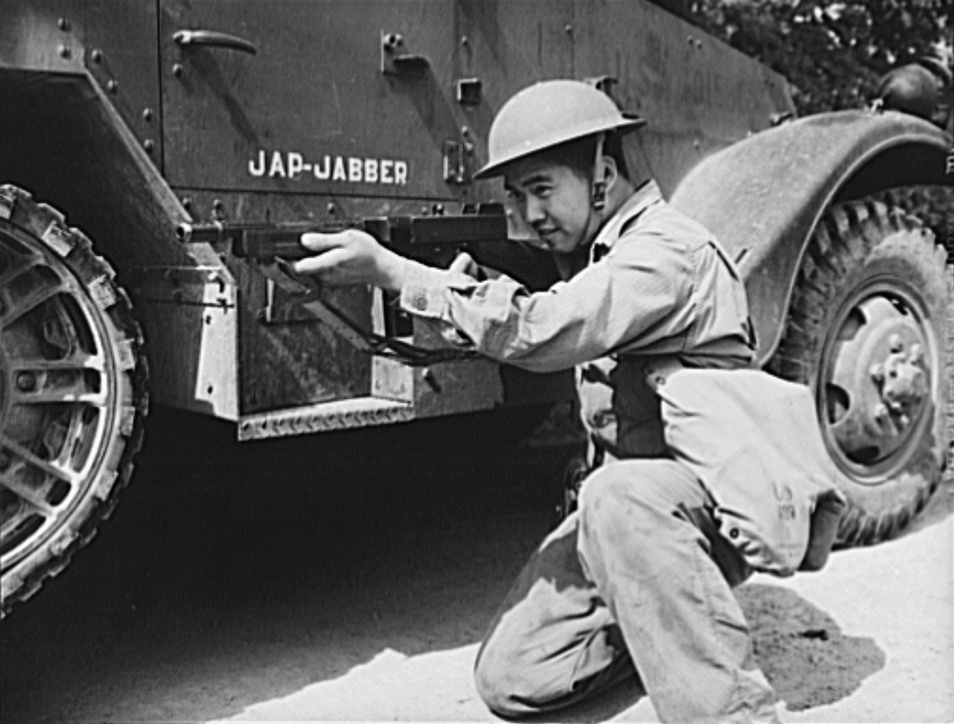
M1928A1 at Fort Knox, Kentucky, June 1942

The M1928A1 variant entered mass production before the attack on Pearl Harbor, as on-hand stocks ran out. Changes included a horizontal forend, in place of the distinctive vertical foregrip ("pistol grip"), and a provision for a military sling. Despite new U.S. contracts for Lend-Lease shipments abroad to China, France, and the United Kingdom, as well as the needs of American armed forces, only two factories supplied M1928A1 Thompsons during the early years of World War II. Though it could use both the 50-round drum and the 20- or 30-round box magazines, active service favored the box magazines as the drums were more prone to jamming, rattled when moving, and were too heavy and bulky on long patrols. 562,511 were made. Wartime production variants had a fixed rear sight without the triangular sight guard wings and a non-ribbed barrel, both like those found on the M1/M1A1.

In addition, the Soviet Union received M1928A1s, included as standard equipment with the M3 light tanks obtained through Lend-Lease. These submachine guns were used to a limited extent by the Red Army.

Some M1928A1 Thompsons were used by the French before and during the Battle of France (1940) under the designation "Pistolet-mitrailleur 11 mm 43 (C.45) M. 28 A1".

An M1928A1 with an unusual inline stock, modified with elevated sights to increase accuracy, also was produced.

=== Service variants ===
==== Thompson Machine Carbine (TMC) ====
In 1940, Commonwealth troops in Egypt and North Africa were issued commercial model Lend-Lease Colt- and Savage-manufactured M1928s. Section commanders carried them instead of pistols or rifles. Many of the Colt models had French-language manuals packed with them as they had been abruptly diverted to England after the fall of France. They soon discovered that the weapon was prone to jamming due to sand. To fix this, the armorers removed the Blish Lock and replaced it with a hex bolt to keep the cocking handle and bolt together. The 20-round Type XX magazines had their peep-holes welded shut to keep sand out and the 50-round Type L drums were discontinued. Ammunition was scarce as it was either in small lots of Lend-Lease commercial ammo or obtained from adjacent American troops. It was later replaced by the 9mm Sten gun and Lanchester submachine gun.

Models used in the Pacific by Australian troops had their sling swivels remounted on the left side to allow it to be fired more easily while prone. A metal sling mount was fitted to the left side of the wooden buttstock. Ammunition was manufactured in Australia or obtained from adjacent American troops. It was later replaced by the Owen Machine Carbine.

==== M1 ====
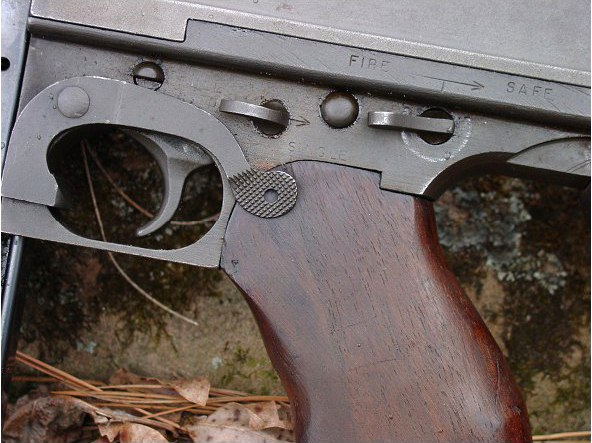
Fire controls on an M1 Thompson. The front lever is the selector switch, set for full automatic fire.

Responding to a request for further simplification, the M1 was standardized in April 1942 as the United States Submachine Gun, Cal. .45, M1. Rate of fire was reduced to approximately 600–700 rpm.

First issued in 1943, the M1 uses a simple blowback operation, with the charging handle moved to the side. The flip-up adjustable Lyman rear sight was replaced with a fixed L sight. Late M1s had triangular guard wings added to the rear L sight, which were standardized on the M1A1. The slots adjoining the magazine well allowing the use of a drum magazine were removed. A new magazine catch with the provision for retaining drum magazines removed, was produced, but most M1s and later M1A1s retained the original. The less expensive and more-easily manufactured "stick" magazines were used exclusively in the M1, with a new 30-round version joining the familiar 20-round type. The Cutts compensator, barrel cooling fins, and Blish lock were omitted while the buttstock was permanently affixed. Late production M1 stocks were fitted with reinforcing bolts and washers to prevent splitting of the stock where it attached to the receiver. The British had used improvised bolts or wood screws to reinforce M1928 stocks. The M1 reinforcing bolt and washer were carried over to the M1A1 and retrofitted to many of the M1928A1s in American and British service. Late M1s also had simplified fire control switches, also carried over to the M1A1. Certain M1s had issues with high rate of fire climbing up to ~800 RPM. The exact cause remains unknown, but was resolved with the transition to the M1A1.

==== M1A1 ====
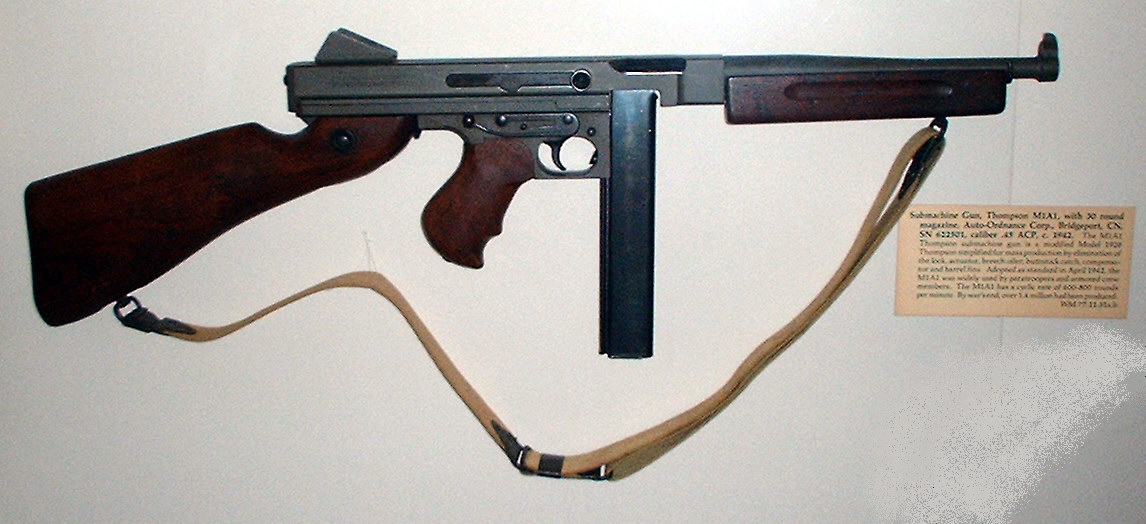
A M1A1 Thompson submachine gun is on display at the Virginia War Museum.

The M1A1, standardized in October 1942 as the United States Submachine Gun, Cal. .45, M1A1, could be produced in half the time of the M1928A1, and at a much lower cost. The main difference between the M1 and M1A1 was the bolt. The M1 bolt had a floating firing pin and hammer, and the bolt of the M1A1 had the firing pin machined to the face of the bolt, eliminating unnecessary parts. The reinforced stock and protective sight wings were standard. The 30-round magazine became more common. In 1939, Thompsons cost the government $209 apiece. By the spring of 1942, cost-reduction design changes had brought this down to $70. In February 1944, the M1A1 reached a low price of $45 each, including accessories and spare parts, although the difference in price between the M1 and M1A1 was only $0.06. By the end of the war, the M1A1 was replaced with the even lower-cost M3 (commonly called the "Grease Gun").

=== Semi-automatic ===
==== Model 1927 ====
The Model 1927 was the open bolt semi-automatic version of the M1921. It was made by modifying an existing Model 1921, including replacing certain parts. The "Thompson Submachine Gun" inscription was machined over to replace it with "Thompson Semi-Automatic Carbine", and the "Model 1921" inscription was also machined over to replace it with "Model 1927". Although the Model 1927 was semi-automatic only, it was easily converted to fully automatic by installing a full-auto Model 1921 fire control group (internal parts). Most Model 1927s owned by police have been converted back to full-auto. The original Model 1927 is classified as a machine gun under the National Firearms Act of 1934 (a) by being "readily convertible" by swapping parts and (b) by a 1982 BATF ruling making all open bolt semi-automatic firearms manufactured after the date of this ruling classified as machine guns.

==== Model 1927A1 ====
The Model 1927A1 is a semi-automatic replica version of the Thompson, originally produced by Auto-Ordnance of West Hurley, New York for the civilian collector's market from 1974 to 1999. It has been produced since 1999 by Kahr Arms of Worcester, Massachusetts. It is officially known as the "Thompson Semi-Automatic Carbine, Model of 1927A1." The internal design is completely different to operate from the closed bolt and the carbine has a barrel length of 16.5 in (420 mm) (versus open bolt operation and barrel length of 10.5 in (270 mm) for the fully automatic versions). Under federal regulations, these changes make the Model 1927A1 legally a rifle and remove it from the federal registry requirements of the National Firearms Act. These modern versions should not be confused with the original semi-automatic M1927, which was a slightly modified M1921 produced by Colt for Auto-Ordnance.

The Model 1927A1 is the semi-automatic replica of the Thompson Models of 1921 and 1927. The "Thompson Commando" is a semi-automatic replica of the M1928A1. The Auto-Ordnance replica of the Thompson M1 and M1A1 is known as the TM1 and may be found marked "Thompson Semi-Automatic Carbine, Caliber .45M1".

==== Model 1927 A-1C "Lightweight Deluxe" ====
The Model 1927 A-1C Lightweight Deluxe .45 ACP semi-automatic pistol caliber carbine uses an alloy receiver and polymer handguard/pistol grip/stock reducing the weight to 8 lbs/3.6 kg. The stock/rear sight are similar to the M1A1 whereas the finned barrel/cutts compensator/foregrip/cocking handle are similar to the M1921.

==== Model 1927A3 ====
The Model 1927A3 is a semi-automatic, .22 caliber version of the Thompson produced by Auto-Ordnance in West Hurley.

==== Model 1927A5 ====
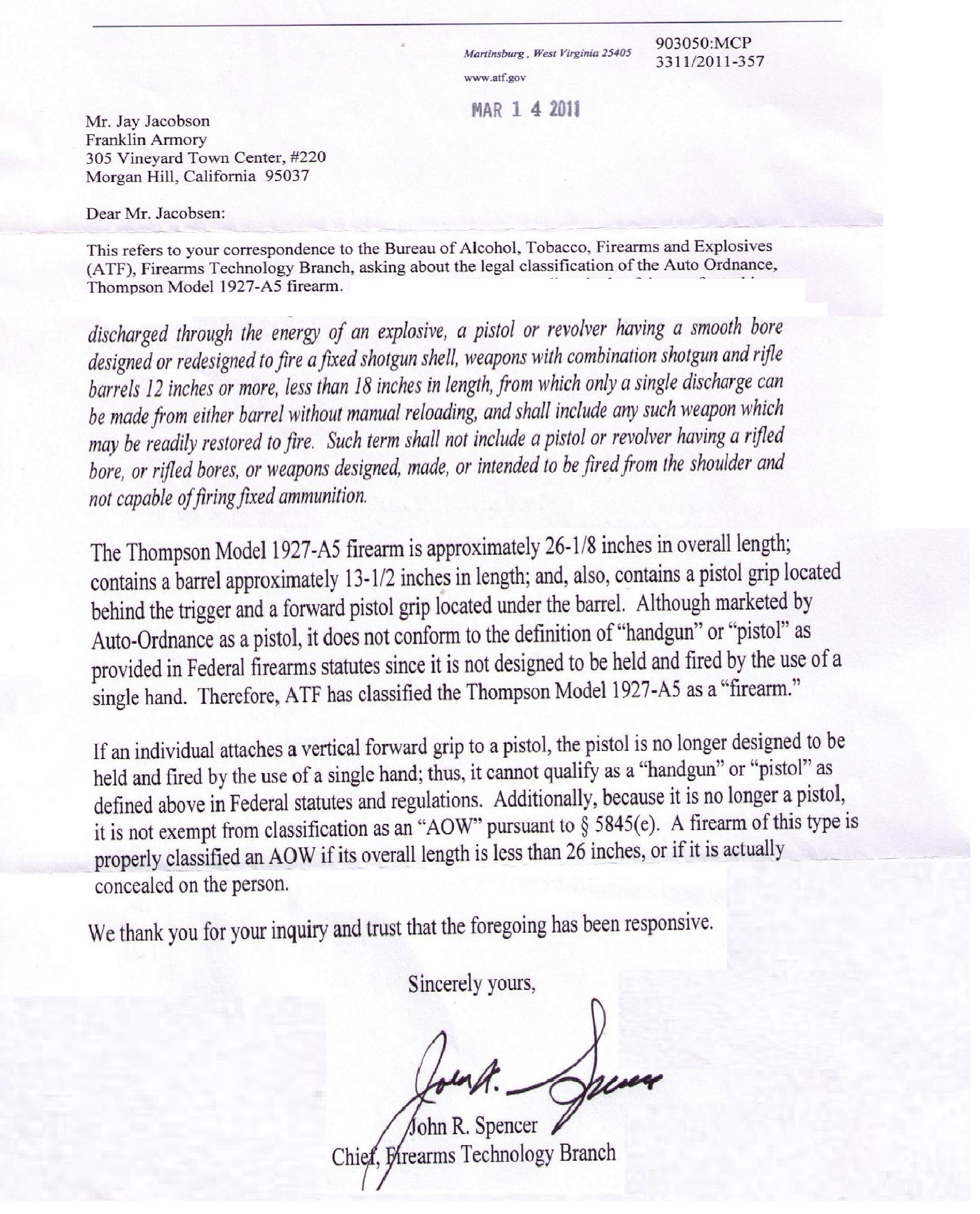
Auto-Ordnance 1927A5 DOJ BATFE Firearm Classification Letter

The Model 1927A5 is a semi-automatic, .45 ACP pistol version of the Thompson originally produced by Auto-Ordnance in West Hurley from the 1970s until the late 1980s or early 1990s. It featured an aluminum receiver to reduce weight. It has since been replaced with the Kahr Arms TA5 Pistol, which features a 10.5" barrel and steel receiver, unlike the 1927A5's 13" barrel and aluminum receiver.

As per the NFA (National Firearms Act of 1934), the "1927A5 .45 ACP Pistol" is simply classified as a "Firearm" (Any type of firearm with an overall length of 26" or greater, that does not have a buttstock) as it neither fits the definition of a Pistol or Rifle under federal law. This categorization also legally allows it to have 1921 or 1928 style foregrip equipped, unlike other "pistol style" Thompson variants, without an AOW (Any Other Weapon) Tax Stamp.

==== 1928A1 LTD ====
The 1928A1 LTD is a civilian semi-automatic conversion by Luxembourg Defense Technology (LuxDefTec) in Luxembourg. They are made from original 1928A1 guns of various appearance (with or without Cutt's compensator, ribbed or smooth barrels, adjustable or fixed sights), that were imported Lend-Lease guns from Russia.

=== BSA Thompsons (export) ===
In an attempt to expand interest and sales overseas, Auto-Ordnance entered into a partnership with and licensed the Birmingham Small Arms Company Limited (BSA) in England to produce a European model. These were produced in small quantities and have a different appearance than the classic style. The BSA 1926 was manufactured in 9mmP and 7.63mm Mauser and were tested by various governments, including France, in the mid-1920s. It was never adopted by any military force, and only a small number were produced.

=== Thompson clones ===
Similar weapons were manufactured by Apache Arms, Eagle Gun Co., Volunteer Enterprises Inc, and Spitfire MFG Co.

== Civilian ownership ==
=== Canada ===
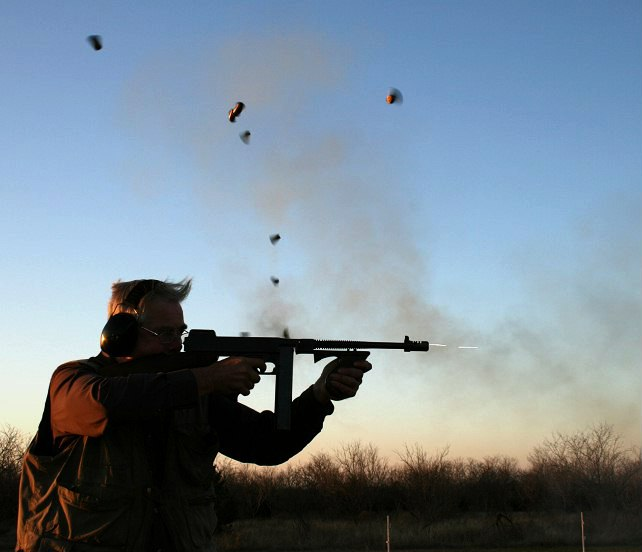
Firing the M1928 Thompson

All variants and modified versions of Thompson submachine guns (even semiautomatic-only versions) are prohibited by name in Canada, as part of Prohibited Weapons Order No. 13 in 1995. Consequently, they cannot be legally imported or owned except under very limited circumstances. For example, to own one the person must be "grandfathered" (have owned one before the bill was passed against it), and have a valid prohibited-class firearms licence. Additionally, it would need to be already registered with the Canadian Firearms Registry. The submachine gun itself is not grandfathered like in the U.S., only the owner with the valid prohibited-class firearms licence is.

The submachine gun can only be sold to other grandfathered individuals with a prohibited-class (12.2) licence, or to a business, museum or organization with a firearms business licence for prohibited-class firearms. This keeps prices extremely low as the number of permitted licensed individuals is very small and dwindling with time. Eventually, all prohibited-class firearms will be out of circulation with the grandfathered individual licence holders. However, they will still be able to be owned by licensed businesses and museums.

== Users ==
- Australia
- Algeria: Used by the National Liberation Front.
- Argentina: M1928 and M1 Thompson.
- Belgium: Used by the Belgian Army and Gendarmerie post-WW2, and it remained in service with the Gendarmerie until 1971.
- Bolivia: M1921 used during the Chaco War. M1A1 used by police
- Brazil: Adopted by the Pernambuco military police and used against cult members during the 1938 Pau de Colher massacre. 8 Thompsons were bought for the Federal District's special police; Each of the four shock detachments was armed with two Thompsons, two Suomi KP31s, and two Bergmann submachineguns The M1 was Used by the Brazilian forces from WWII until the mid-1980s.
- (British Raj) British India: Widely used by the Indian Army in the Malayan Campaign, in the European theatre and Burma Campaigns.
- Canada
- Cuba
- People's Republic of China: Unlicensed copies
- Republic of China
- Croatia
- Dominican Republic
- Egypt: Simplified copies of the Thompson were manufactured under license after WW2, with barrels and magazines imported from the United States. Those copies used 20 round stick magazines and lacked a flash hider.
- Ethiopian Empire: M1928A1 and M1 issued to Ethiopian forces during the Korean War
- France: The M1928A1 was used as the Pistolet-mitrailleur 11 mm 43 (C.45) M. 28 A1. The M1A1 was also used.
- Greece: Used by Greek armed forces, resistance fighters, Gendarmerie and police units during World War II and immediately postwar period.
- Guatemala: M1A1 used Policía Nacional Civil up to 2014.
- Haiti
- Honduras
- Iraq: Iraqi insurgents
- Imperial State of Iran: Used by the Imperial Iranian Guard Units, first saw action during the Iran crisis of 1946.
- India
- Indonesia
- Israel
- Italy: Captured examples pressed into use by the Italian Army prior to September 8, 1943. Also supplied to partisans and to the Italian Co-belligerent Army. After the war, it was mostly issued to Italian Air Force troopers and the Carabinieri.
- Japan: Some experimented on by the Imperial Japanese Navy in 1930. Some captured by Imperial Japanese Army and used in service. Others captured from British soldiers after Singapore was occupied. Thompsons used in Burma by the IJA, loaded with tracer bullets during recon at night. It's known in service with the National Police Reserve and the Japanese Self-Defense Force as the "11.4mm短機関銃M1".
- Jordan
- Kingdom of Laos: Limited received by U.S. government and used during the First Indochina War and Vietnam War.
- Luxembourg: M1A1 in service 1952–1967, replaced by Uzi.
- Malaysia: M1928
- Mexico
- The Netherlands: In early World War II, at least 3,680 Thompsons acquired through Lend-Lease.
- New Zealand: M1928, M1928A1 M1 and M1A1
- Nicaragua: The Nicaraguan National Guard received M1928A1s and some were captured by Sandino's rebels.
- North Korea: Chinese-made Thompsons used by the Korean People's Army in the Korean War.
- North Vietnam: Unlicensed copies. Used by Viet Minh in the First Indochina War.
- Panama: M1928A1 formerly used by the Panamanian National Guard, and used by Dignity Battalion militia of the defunct Panama Defense Forces.
- Philippines: Formerly used by Philippine Constabulary, Filipino guerrillas during WWII and the Philippine Army.
- Poland: M1921 obtained for trial purposes, possibly issued to police forces and the presidential guard. Used by the Polish Armed Forces in the West during WWII and by resistance fighters during the Warsaw Uprising (from supply drops)
- Portugal: Small number of the M1928 variant bought for police use.
- Russia: Wagner Group captured M1 and M1928A1 submachineguns from Ukrainian stocks.
- Somalia
- South Vietnam
- Soviet Union: In 1924 a large number of M1921s was purchased through Mexico and issued to NKVD and border guards. 137,729 were received through Lend-Lease in WW2
- Spanish Republic: M1928 adopted by Catalan police Mossos d'Esquadra in the 1930s and later used during the Spanish Civil War. A number of M1928s were brought from the United States by the Lincoln Battalion.
- Sweden: On 25 January 1940, The Royal Swedish Army ordered 500 M1928 Submachine Guns from AB UNO Lindholm & Co. Each gun was supplied with four 20 round box magazines and one 50 round drum magazine. According to Major Carl-Olof Bjorsell the Swedish Thompson's were sold to Israel during 1950s.
- Turkey: Received US surplus guns after WW2.
- Ukraine: As of 2011 between 10.000 and 20.000 guns were stored in Ministry of Defense warehouse.
- Union of South Africa: Used the M1928 throughout the Western Desert Campaign. Both the M1928A1, M1 and M1A1 variants were issued to members of the South African 6th Armored Division in their campaign in Italy.
- United Kingdom: First issued to the GHQ Liaison Unit ('Phantom') in February 1940, in advance of main War Office contracts. Used by the Home Guard (United Kingdom)
- United States: Employed by the United States Marine Corps and by the United States Army 1938, including paratroops in World War II.
- Uruguay: M1928A1 and M1A1 formerly used by armed forces
- Vietnam: Used by Viet Cong during Vietnam War. Clones made to fire 7.62x25 mm.
- Venezuela
- West Germany: US supplied Thompsons were used by the Bundeswehr before the adoption of the G3.
- Yugoslavia

=== Non-state groups ===
- The Provisional IRA and Official IRA used the 1921 variant, mainly during the early 1960s to 1970s.
- Afghan Mujahideen
- The Angry Brigade
- Azerbaijan People's Government
- Brigade 2506
- Front de Libération de la Côte des Somalis
- Spanish Maquis
- The Thompson was supplied to Malayan Communist Party insurgents during WW2, and used during the Malayan Emergency.
- The Communist Party of Estonia received four Thompsons from the Soviet Union before the failed 1924 coup.
- The Turkish Resistance Organization manufactured its own copies with parts supplied by Turkey.
- Various private armed groups in the Philippines
- New People's Army
- Used by mercenary pilots under General José Gonzalo Escobar.

== See also ==
- Tommy Gun: How General Thompson's Submachine Gun Wrote History
- List of U.S. Army weapons by supply catalog designation SNL A-32
