= USNS Michelson =

History

United States
- Name: SS Joliet Victory
- Builder: Oregon Shipbuilding Corporation, Portland, Oregon
- Laid down: 5 May 1944
- Launched: 14 June 1944
- In service: 7 July 1944
- Out of service: 1 July 1948
- In service: 27 July 1950
- Out of service: 31 October 1953

United States
- Name: USNS Michelson (T-AGS-23)
- Namesake: Albert Abraham Michelson
- Acquired: 8 February 1958
- In service: 15 December 1958
- Stricken: 15 April 1975
- Fate: Sold, 22 September 1977

General characteristics (as built)
- Type: Type VC-2-AP2 Victory ship
- Displacement: 4,420 long tons (4,491 t) light; 13,050 long tons (13,259 t) full load
- Length: 455 ft (139 m)
- Beam: 62 ft (19 m)
- Draft: 23 ft (7.0 m)
- Propulsion: Cross compound steam turbine, 6,000–8,500 hp (4,474–6,338 kW)
- Speed: 16 knots (30 km/h; 18 mph)

USNS Michelson (T-AGS-23) was a Bowditch class oceanographic survey ship of the United States Navy. Launched as the SS Joliet Victory in 1944, Maritime Commission hull number MCV 114, a type VC2-S-AP3 Victory ship, she was named after Albert Abraham Michelson. The ship was reactivated from the James River Maritime Administration Reserve Fleet on 8 February 1958, delivered to the Navy Department at the Philadelphia Naval Shipyard on 8 August 1957 and converted to an AGS by the Charleston Naval Shipyard. USNS Michelson (AGS‑23) was placed in service on 15 December 1958 under the operational control of MSTS Atlantic.

== SS Joliet Victory WW2 ==
SS Joliet Victory was a World War II era Victory ship. She was laid down on 5 May 1944, and delivered to the Maritime Commission on 30 June 1944. She served in the Pacific War, participating in the landings on Leyte in late 1944. Joliet Victory was operated by the Alaska SS Company under charter with the Maritime Commission and War Shipping Administration. SS Joliet Victory Naval Armed Guard crews earned Battle Stars in World War II for war action in during the Invasion of Lingayen Gulf from 4 Jan. 1945 to 18 Jan. 1945. Also a second "Battle Stars" for the Leyte landings in the Battle of Leyte from 5 March 1945 to 13 March 1945. Joliet Victory was active in delivering support for the Battle of Iwo Jima from 19 February to 26 March 1945. In each battle she had to use her deck guns to defend against air attacks. Joliet Victory and the SS Columbia Victory had the dangerous job of supplying artillery ammunition for the Iwo Jima battle.

The ship was laid up in the Hudson River as part of the National Defense Reserve Fleet on 1 July 1948, and was reactivated during the Korean War, serving from 27 July 1950 until 31 October 1953, when she was again laid up in the NDRF in the James River. She was acquired by the U.S. Navy on 8 February 1958, renamed Michelson, and converted to an Oceanographic Survey Ship (AGS) at the Philadelphia Naval Shipyard.

== USNS Michelson T-AGS-23 ==
Michelson was operated by the U.S. Naval Oceanographic Office for the U.S. Navy Office of Special Projects in support of the U.S. Navy Fleet Ballistic Missile Program. Three ships were converted for this purpose: Michelson, and identical sister ships USNS Bowditch and USNS Dutton.

Attached aboard Michelson was a US Navy Oceanographic Detachment, upgraded ca. May 1966 to an Oceanographic Unit, of approximately 3 officers and 22 enlisted personnel, mostly technicians. Varying numbers of civilian scientists and engineers managed survey operations, and maintained certain navigation and sonar equipment, usually about 12 oceanographers from the Naval Oceanographic Office, some personnel from the Naval Applied Sciences Laboratory (NASL, later NSSNF), and about 7 technical representatives from private corporations.

Michelson was taken out of service and disposed of by MARAD sale on September 22, 1977.

== See also ==
- List of Victory ships
- Liberty ship
- Type C1 ship
- Type C2 ship
- Type C3 ship

== Sources ==
- Sawyer, L.A. and W.H. Mitchell. Victory ships and tankers: The history of the ‘Victory’ type cargo ships and of the tankers built in the United States of America during World War II, Cornell Maritime Press, 1974, 0-87033-182-5.
- United States Maritime Commission:
- Victory Cargo Ships
