= Thompson Autorifle =

American .30-06 semi-automatic rifle

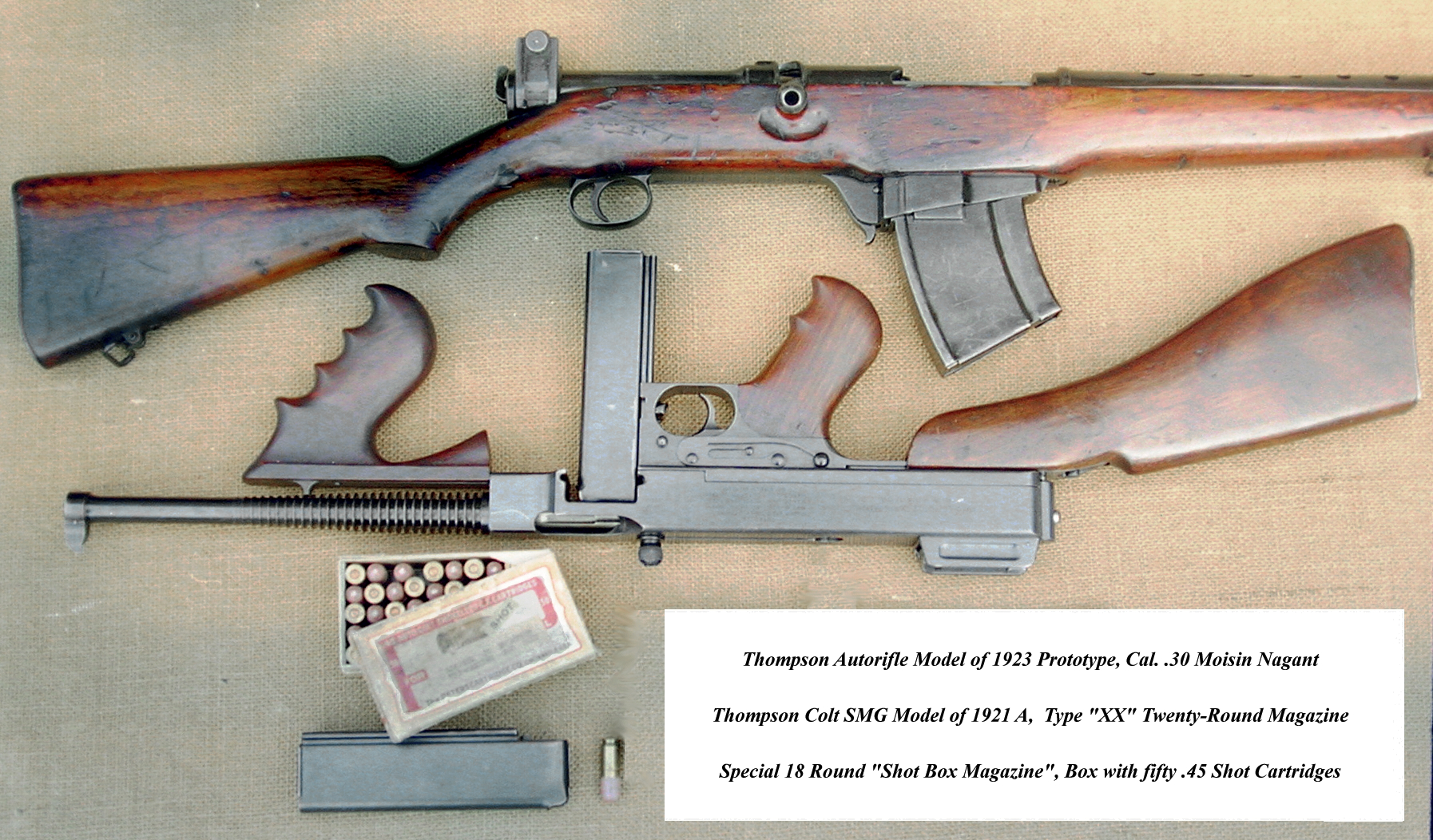
- Thompson Autorifle Model 1923 (top) and SMG Model 1921
- Type: Semi-automatic rifle Light machine gun
- Place of origin: United States

Production history
- Designed: 1923–1929
- Manufacturer: Auto Ordnance
- Variants: See Variants

Specifications
- Cartridge: .30 06; 7.62x54mmR.276 Pedersen.303 British
- Action: Delayed Blowback
- Rate of fire: Semi-automatic
- Feed system: 5, 20-round detachable box magazine

The Thompson Autorifle, (also referred to as the Thompson Model 1923 Autoloading Rifle; and the .30-06 Model 1923 Semi-Automatic Rifle, among others, etc.) was a semi-automatic rifle that used a Blish lock to delay the action of the weapon. It was chambered in .30-06, with the 1923 model in 7.62×54mmR Russian rifle rounds.

Several prototypes of the Autorifle were submitted by Auto-Ordnance to the military for the semi-automatic rifle trials, but it was not adopted. The Autorifle Model 1929, in .276 Pedersen, was tested in a competition with the rifles by J.D. Pedersen (delayed blowback) and John C. Garand (gas-operated), which culminated in the adoption of the M1 Garand.

On the positive side, the Autorifle action avoided the complexity of recoil-operated and gas-operated actions. On the negative side, the Autorifle required lubricated ammunition for proper functioning and the ejection of spent cartridge casings was so violent as to be hazardous to bystanders.

== Function ==
For reloading, the Thompson Autorifle uses an interrupted screw delayed blowback operation where the bolt has 85° angled interrupted rear locking lugs that have to overcome a rotation of 110° ( 90° to unlock before the angle blend of 70°/40° and 6°) that delays the action until the gas pressure drops to a safe level to eject. The bolt cocks the striker on opening (a la Mauser) and fires from a closed position. When firing, the trigger when pulled pushes a lever connected to a sear to fire the weapon. The receiver is of a round section with the safety switch at the rear along with the rear sight. The magazine is stripper fed holding 5 rounds and lubricated by oiled pads; later prototypes used 20-round M1918 BAR magazines.

== Variants ==
=== BSA Autorifle ===
The BSA Autorifle was a British automatic rifle designed by Birmingham Small Arms Co. This rifle was manufactured by BSA under their licensing agreement with the Auto-Ordnance Corp. It was offered for British Army trials during the 1920s.

The weapon was an improved derivative of the Thompson Autorifle that could be operated manually if the two curved 'shutters' around the bolt head are moved into the down position. By this means the mechanism is disconnected and the rifle can be used as a manual loader. This facility was a requirement in self-loaders offered for British trials at this period. The weapon took part in trials during 1927 against a Colt-made Thompson, an 'improved' BSA Thompson, a gas-operated BSA and the Farquhar Hill. Although in 1928 reports it narrowly beat the 'improved' BSA and the Farquhar Hill in the third place, it never advanced past prototype stages as none were found acceptable and development of the BSA Autorifle waned.

BSA Guns Ltd, a licensee of protecting the patents of the Thompson Autorifle made a handful of the 1923 model Thompsons as 'heavy rifles' with folding bipods and finned barrels. Surviving examples suggest there were Rifle and Light Machine Gun variants and 6 of both types were manufactured. The first examples were made in 1924 and an 'improved' variant in 1926. The 'improved' BSA Thompson had a shorter operation with a straight pull cocking handle installed at the rear of a cocking sleeve.

The BSA Autorifle is a delayed blowback–operated rifle chambered in the .303 British round and fed from a removable 10-round box magazine. Much like its predecessor, it uses a bolt with 85° angled threads delayed by a 90° twist to unlock from a bronze nut until the gas pressure drops to a safe level to eject. The bolt cocks the striker on opening (a la Mauser) and fires from a closed position. When firing, the trigger when pulled pushes a lever connected to a sear to fire the weapon. The receiver is of a round section with the safety switch at the rear along with the rear sight.

== See also ==
- List of delayed-blowback firearms
- List of battle rifles
