= Stiction =

Threshold of force

Stiction (a portmanteau of the words static and friction) is the force that needs to be overcome to enable relative motion of stationary objects in contact. Any solid objects pressing against each other (but not sliding) will require some threshold of force parallel to the surface of contact in order to overcome static adhesion. Stiction is a threshold, not a continuous force. However, stiction might also be an illusion made by the rotation of kinetic friction.

In situations where two surfaces with areas below the micrometer scale come into close proximity (as in an accelerometer), they may adhere together. At this scale, electrostatic and/or Van der Waals and hydrogen bonding forces become significant. The phenomenon of two such surfaces being adhered together in this manner is also called stiction. Stiction may be related to hydrogen bonding or residual contamination.

== Automobiles ==
Stiction is also the same threshold at which a rolling object would begin to slide over a surface rather than rolling at the expected rate (and in the case of a wheel, in the expected direction). In this case, it is called "rolling friction" or μ_{r}.

This is why driver training courses teach that, if a car begins to slide sideways, the driver should avoid braking and instead try to steer in the same direction as the slide. This gives the wheels a chance to regain static contact by rolling, which gives the driver some control again. Similarly, when trying to accelerate rapidly (particularly from a standing start) an overenthusiastic driver may "squeal" the driving wheels, but this impressive display of noise and smoke is less effective than maintaining static contact with the road. Many stunt-driving techniques (such as drifting) are done by deliberately breaking and/or regaining this rolling friction.

A car on a slippery surface can slide a long way with little control over orientation if the driver "locks" the wheels in stationary positions by pressing hard on the brakes. Anti-lock braking systems use wheel speed sensors and vehicle speed sensors to determine if any of the wheels have stopped turning. The ABS module then briefly releases pressure to any wheel that is spinning too slowly to not be slipping, to allow the road surface to begin turning the wheel freely again. Anti-lock brakes can be much more effective than cadence braking, which is essentially a manual technique for doing the same thing.

== Examples ==
=== Engineering ===
Stiction refers to the characteristic of start-and-stop–type motion of a mechanical assembly. Consider a mechanical element slowly increasing an external force on an assembly at rest that is designed for the relative rotation or sliding of its parts in contact. The static contact friction between the assembly parts resists movement, causing the spring moments in the assembly to store mechanical energy. Any part of the assembly that can elastically bend, even microscopically, and exert a restoring force contributes a spring moment. Thus the "springs" in an assembly might not be obvious to the eye. The increasing external force finally exceeds the static friction resisting force, and the spring moments, released, impulsively exert their restoring forces on both the moving assembly parts and, by Newton's third law, in reaction on the external forcing element. The assembly parts then impulsively accelerate with respect to each other, though resisted by dynamic contact friction (in this context very much less than the static friction). However, the forcing element cannot accelerate at the same pace, fails to keep up, and loses contact. The external force on the moving assembly momentarily drops to zero for lack of forcing mechanical contact even though the external force element continues its motion. The moving part then decelerates to a stop from the dynamic contact friction. The cycle repeats as the forcing element catches up to contact again. Stick, store spring energy, impulsively release spring energy, accelerate, decelerate, stop, stick. Repeat.

Stiction is a problem for the design and materials science of many moving linkages. This is particularly the case for linear sliding joints, rather than rotating pivots. Owing to simple geometry, the moving distance of a sliding joint in two comparable linkages is longer than the circumferential travel of a pivoting bearing, thus the forces involved (for equivalent work) are lower and stiction forces become proportionally more significant. This issue has often led to linkages being redesigned from sliding to purely pivoted structures, just to avoid problems with stiction. An example is the Chapman strut, a suspension linkage.

=== Surface micromachining ===
During surface micromachining, stiction or adhesion between the substrate (usually silicon-based) and the microstructure occurs during the isotropic wet etching of the sacrificial layer. The capillary forces due to the surface tension of the liquid between the microstructure and substrate during drying of the wet etchant cause the two surfaces to adhere together. Separating the two surfaces is often complicated due to the fragile nature of the microstructure. Stiction is often circumvented by the use of a sublimating fluid (often supercritical CO_{2}, which has extremely low surface tension) in a drying process where the liquid phase is bypassed. CO_{2} displaces the rinsing fluid and is heated past the supercritical point. As the chamber pressure is slowly released the CO_{2} sublimates, thereby preventing stiction.

== See also ==
- Blish lock
- Gauge block wringing
