= Benjamin Dutton Jr. =

U.S. Navy captain, navigator, and author (1883–1937)

Benjamin Dutton Jr., (April 3, 1883 – November 30, 1937) was a United States Navy captain, expert navigator, and author.

== Biography ==
Benjamin Dutton Jr. was born in Shippensburg, Pennsylvania, on 3 April 1883. He was appointed to the Naval Academy from the 26th District of Pennsylvania in 1901. He graduated in 1905 and was assigned to USS Dixie (1893). He was attached to USS Scorpion (PY-3) until 1907, after which he made the round-the-world cruise with the Battle Fleet on USS Kentucky (BB-6). He served on USS Tennessee (ACR-10) until June 1911, and the next month became an instructor at the Naval Academy, where he remained for two years. During 1913 and 1914 he was first lieutenant on board USS Kansas (BB-21), which operated off the east coast of Mexico. He was transferred to USS Machias (PG-5) in 1915 and served as her executive officer and navigator until he was again assigned to the Naval Academy for duty until 1916. In March 1918 he was ordered to USS New Mexico (BB-40) and in August 1918 reported as executive officer of USS Pueblo (CA-7), which was engaged in convoy service before the Armistice and later returned troops from France.

He was executive officer of the ex-German battleship Osfriesland, which was placed in commission early in 1920 at Rosyth, Scotland, and brought to the United States with the ex-German light cruiser Frankfurt in tow. He was aide and flag secretary to Admiral Hilary P. Jones, commander in chief of United States Fleet in 1922 and in 1923 was ordered to the Naval Academy, where he served as executive officer in the Department of Navigation and later as head of the Department of Electrical Engineering. He was the author of Navigation and Nautical Astronomy used as a textbook at the Naval Academy and in the merchant marine.

He commanded USS Nokomis (SP-609), engaged in surveying the northern coast of Cuba, and was a member of the staff of the Naval War College after completing the Senior Course. From 1931 to 1933 he was in command of USS Wyoming (BB-32) and until 1935 was assigned to the Bureau of Navigation. He became naval attaché at Berlin, Germany, in May 1935, with additional duty at Oslo, Norway; Copenhagen, Denmark; Stockholm, Sweden; The Hague, the Netherlands; and, after 1935, at Helsingfor, Finland. He returned to the United States in April 1937 and on 10 June of that year assumed command of USS Portland (CA-33).

Captain Dutton died suddenly on 30 November 1937 at South Gate, California, while in command of Portland.

== Works ==
- Navigation and nautical astronomy. 1926. US Naval Institute.

== Namesakes ==
Two ships of the US Navy have been named in his honor:

- USS Dutton (AGS-8)
- USNS Dutton (T-AGS-22)
