= Blish lock =

Type of breech locking mechanism

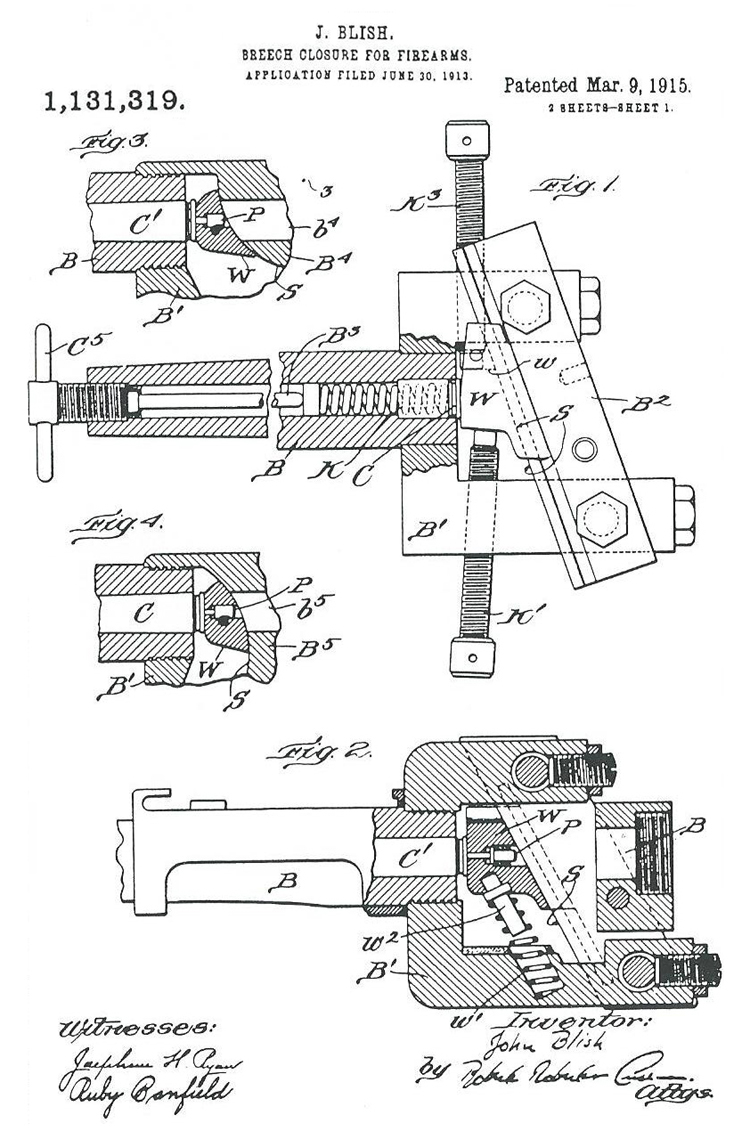
Blish patent

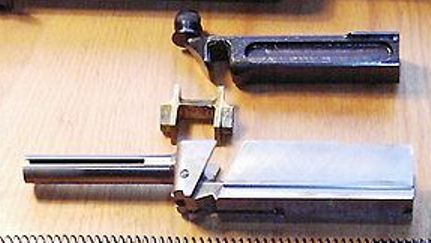
Thompson M1928A1 bolt group with an "H" type Blish-lock piece

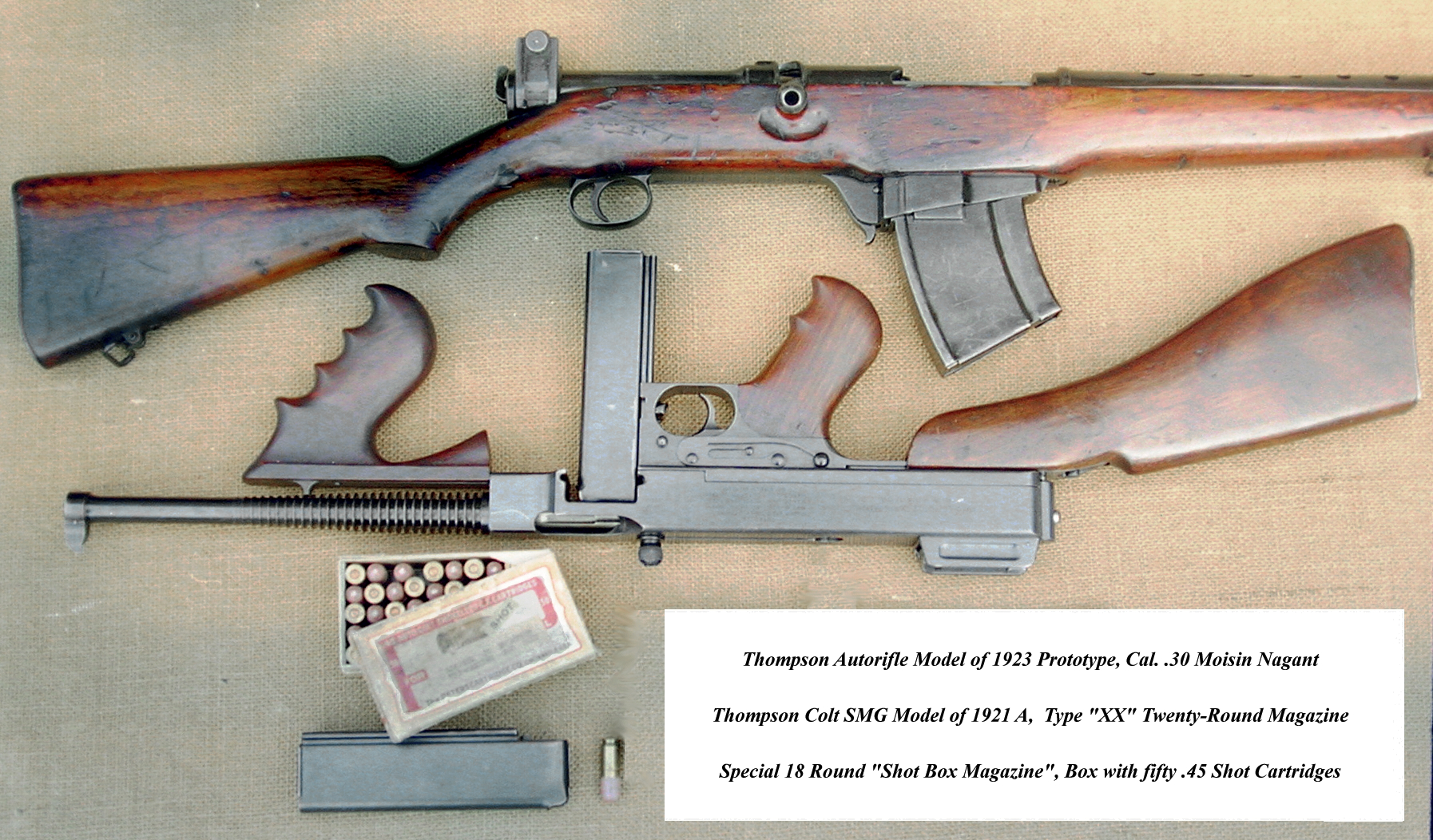
The Thompson Autorifle Model 1923 (top, upright) chambered in 30-06 and SMG Model of 1921 (bottom, inverted) are both examples of firearms that used the Blish lock

The Blish lock is a breech locking mechanism designed by John Bell Blish based upon his assumption that under extreme pressures, certain dissimilar metals would resist movement with a force greater than friction laws would predict. In modern engineering terminology, it is an extreme manifestation of what is now called static friction, or stiction. His locking mechanism was used first in the Thompson submachine gun. Nowadays it is discredited as a useful firearm operating principle, due to its almost nonexistent effects on the operation and functioning of a firearm; because of that, firearms which theoretically employed it operate not by the supposed Blish lock principle, but, in fact, by blowback operation.

== Invention ==
The Blish lock resulted from John Blish's observation of large naval guns. He noticed that the breech blocks of naval guns with interrupted thread breeches remained closed when fired with full charges, but tended to unscrew when fired with light charges. He concluded that dissimilar metals have a tendency to adhere to each other when subjected to very high pressure. This principle of metallic adhesion of dissimilar metals became known as the Blish principle. Blish put this theory to use in a delayed-blowback breech mechanism. He developed a working model that used a simple wedge as the delay mechanism, and was eventually assigned U.S. patent 1,131,319 on March 9, 1915.

Despite the patent and use of the system in the Thompson submachine gun, the Blish principle found little scientific backing. In the simplified WWII M1 Thompson re-design, the Blish locking block was removed without substantial change to the gun's function with the .45 ACP cartridge. The Blish principle did provide delay in the Thompson prototypes using the .45 Remington–Thompson and .30 Carbine cartridges which generate higher pressure than the .45 ACP, a pistol round. With high power rifle cartridges such as .30-06 Springfield, the delay offered by the Blish principle was not enough to prevent the violent ejection of fired cartridge casings, which was hazardous to bystanders. The autorifles developed by Thompson, Colt, and BSA in the 1920s using the Blish principle never went beyond the prototype or trial stage.

== Applications ==
The most famous application of the Blish lock were the Thompson submachine gun and the Thompson Autorifle. Several engineers suspected the Autorifle functioned more as a delayed blowback than as an adhesion-locked breech action. Some authorities, such as Julian Hatcher, felt the Blish lock as employed in the submachine gun did not accomplish much in terms of actual breech locking. In fact, the submachine gun was successfully redesigned as a simple blowback weapon (the M1/M1A1). Any real advantages to the system were far outweighed by the additional cost of manufacture associated with the device. Also, in the Thompson submachine gun the H-shaped bronze lock connects the bolt actuator to the bolt body; incorrect installation of the Blish lock can render a Thompson inoperable upon firing.

== See also ==
- Glossary of firearms terms
