= John Bell Blish =

American inventor (1860–1921)

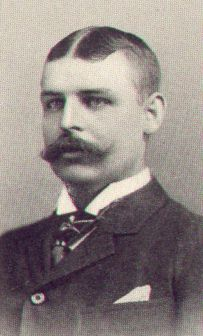
- Born: August 9, 1860; Seymour, Indiana
- Died: December 22, 1921 (aged 61); U.S.
- Occupation: Inventor
- Known for: Developing the Blish lock

John Bell Blish (September 8, 1860 – December 22, 1921) was an American inventor known primarily for developing the Blish lock, used in the Thompson submachine gun, more commonly known as the "Tommy Gun". Blish was born in Seymour, Indiana, and attended the United States Naval Academy at Annapolis. Blish licensed the patent for his lock to the Auto-Ordnance Corporation in 1915 in return for company stock.

Blish was a career United States naval officer, serving as executive officer on the U.S. warships Niagara and Vicksburg (PG-11) during the Spanish–American War. He retired from the United States Navy with the rank of Commander in 1919.

Blish was buried at Arlington National Cemetery.

== Namesake ==
The USS John Blish, a survey ship commissioned during World War II, was named after him.
