= USNS Dutton =

Survey vessel launched in 1945

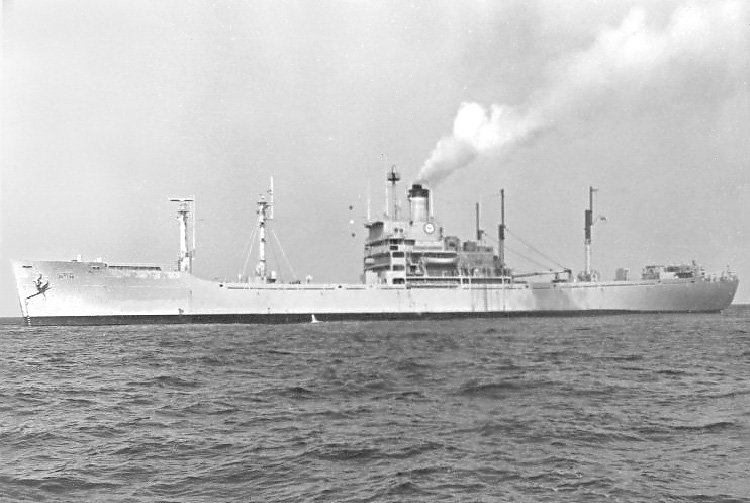
- USNS Dutton (T-AGS-22) underway.

History

United States
- Name: USNS Dutton (T-AGS-22)
- Namesake: Benjamin Dutton, Jr.
- Ordered: As victory ship SS Tuskegee Victory
- Laid down: 1945-02-16
- In service: 1 November 1958
- Stricken: 14 February 1980
- Identification: Hull number 682, type VC2-S-AP3, IMO number: 7738462
- Fate: Scrapped September 2007

General characteristics
- Displacement: 4,420 tons (light) 13,050 tons (full)
- Length: 455 ft (139 m)
- Beam: 62 ft (19 m)
- Draft: 23 ft (7.0 m)
- Speed: 16 knots

USNS Dutton (T-AGS-22) was an oceanographic survey ship for the United States Navy from the late 1950s through the 1980s. She was launched as SS Tuskegee Victory in 1945, Maritime Commission hull number MCV 682, a type VC2-S-AP3 Victory ship. In her U.S. Navy service, she was named after Captain Benjamin Dutton, Jr., and was the second U.S. Navy ship named in his honor.

== SS Tuskegee Victory ==
SS Tuskegee Victory was a Victory ship laid down on 16 February 1945 and delivered to the Maritime Commission on 8 May 1945 and operated by the Weyerhaeuser Steamship Company. After seven years of commercial service, she was laid up in the National Defense Reserve Fleet in 1952. Five years later she was acquired by the U.S. Navy, renamed Dutton, and converted to a Bowditch class oceanographic survey ship (AGS) at the Philadelphia Naval Shipyard from 8 November 1957 to 16 November 1958.

== USNS Dutton T-AGS-22 ==
USNS Dutton T-AGS-22 was placed in service on 1 November 1958 and assigned to the Military Sea Transportation Service, crewed by civilians.

Dutton was operated by the U.S. Naval Oceanographic Office for the U.S. Navy Office of Special Projects in support of the U.S. Navy Fleet Ballistic Missile Program. Three ships were converted for this purpose: Dutton, and identical sister ships, Bowditch and Michelson. Dutton participated in the recovery effort of the 1966 Palomares B-52 crash from January through April 1966.

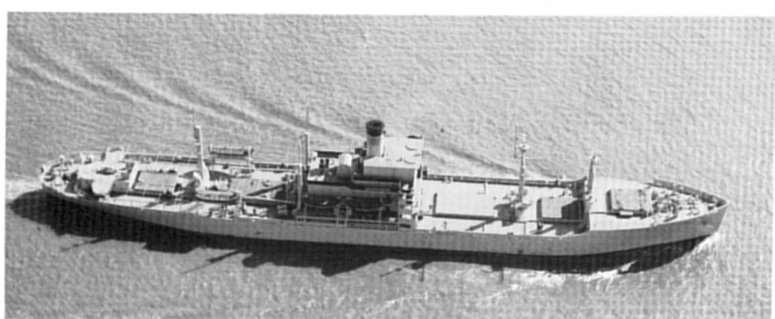

Attached aboard Dutton was a U.S. Navy Oceanographic Detachment, upgraded ca. May 1966 to an Oceanographic Unit, of approximately 3 officers and 22 enlisted personnel, mostly technicians. Varying numbers of civilian scientists and engineers managed survey operations and maintained certain navigation and sonar equipment, usually about 12 oceanographers from the Naval Oceanographic Office, some personnel from the Naval Applied Sciences Laboratory (NASL, later NSSNF), and about 7 technical representatives from private corporations.

Dutton was taken out of service ca. 1989. Contract award by MARAD in September 2007 to All Star Metals Inc. for scrapping in Brownsville, TX with ship fully dismantled on 5 June 2008.
