= USS Dutton (AGS-8) =

Minesweeper of the United States Navy

History

United States
- Name: USS PCS-1396
- Builder: South Coast Co.; Newport Beach, California
- Launched: 7 August 1943
- Sponsored by: Miss Cynthia A. Gaffney
- Commissioned: 29 March 1944
- Reclassified: AGS-8, 20 March 1945
- Renamed: Dutton, 24 March 1945
- Namesake: Benjamin Dutton, Jr.
- Reclassified: AGSC-8, 29 July 1946
- Decommissioned: 26 August 1949
- Stricken: Date unknown
- Honors and awards: 3 battle stars, World War II
- Fate: Sold, 21 February 1950

General characteristics
- Class & type: PCS-1376-class minesweeper
- Displacement: 340 t.
- Length: 136 ft (41.5 m)
- Beam: 23 ft 4 in (7.11 m)
- Draft: 8 ft 7 in (2.62 m)
- Speed: 14 knots (26 km/h)
- Complement: 74
- Armament: 1 × 3"/50 caliber dual purpose gun mount

USS Dutton (AGSC-8/AGS-8), originally PCS-1396, was a PCS-1376-class minesweeper built for the United States Navy during World War II that was later converted into a survey ship. She was the first US Navy ship to be named in honor of Benjamin Dutton, Jr.

PCS-1396 was launched 7 August 1943 by South Coast Shipyard, Newport Beach, California; sponsored by Miss Cynthia A. Gaffney; and commissioned 29 March 1944. She was reclassified AGS-8, 20 March 1945, and assigned the name Dutton 4 days later. She was redesignated AGSC-8 on 29 July 1946.

PCS-1396 sailed from San Pedro, California, 4 May 1944, and arrived off newly assaulted Saipan 17 June to screen the transport areas and give escort service in the Marianas operations. On 29 August she rescued four Marines from the waters off Tinian. She returned to base at Pearl Harbor 15 October for overhaul.

She got underway 22 January 1945 to escort an LST group on its slow trip across the Pacific for the landings on Iwo Jima 19 February. She continued her service in this operation with surveying and patrol duty. On 1 April she took part in the invasion of Okinawa. Remaining off the bitterly contested island, by day she conducted surveys to determine suitable landing beaches for amphibious craft; by night she guarded against suicide boats and swimmers. On 27 May a Japanese plane crashed into the ship, carrying away part of the bridge, blowing one of her crew overboard, and holing her above the water line. She underwent temporary repairs at Kerama Retto, then sailed to San Pedro Bay, Leyte, for permanent repairs.

Dutton served in the Far East until returning to San Diego 20 January 1946. In the summer of that year she took part in Operation Crossroads, the atomic weapons tests at Bikini. Between 3 February and 13 September 1947 Dutton conducted surveys of the waters surrounding Truk. She sailed for the east coast 11 July 1948, and after preparation at Naval Station Norfolk, joined Hydrographic Survey Group I which put out from New York City 9 September for the Persian Gulf. Dutton surveyed uncharted or poorly known waters off Kuwait and Bahrain until her return to Norfolk 2 June 1949. She was decommissioned at New York 26 August 1949, and sold 21 February 1950.

Dutton received three battle stars for World War II service.
