= List of Victory ships (E) =

This is a list of Victory ships with names beginning with E.

== Description ==
A Victory ship was a cargo ship. The cargo ships were 455 feet 3 inches (138.76 m) overall, 436 feet 6 inches (133.05 m) between perpendiculars They had a beam of 62 feet 0 inches (18.90 m), a depth of 38 feet 0 inches (11.58 m) and a draught of 28 feet 0 inches (8.53 m). They were assessed at 7,612 GRT, 4,555 NRT and 10,750 DWT.

The ships were powered by a triple expansion steam engine, driving a steam turbine via double reduction gear. This gave the ship a speed of 15.5 knots (28.7 km/h) or 16.5 knots (30.6 km/h), depending on the machinery installed.

Liberty ships had five holds. No. 1 hold was 57 feet 6 inches (17.53 m) long, with a capacity of 81,715 cubic feet (2,313.9 m^{3}), No. 2 hold was 45 feet 0 inches (13.72 m) long, with a capacity of 89,370 cubic feet (2,531 m^{3}), No. 3 hold was 78 feet 0 inches (23.77 m) long, with a capacity of 158,000 cubic feet (4,500 m^{3}), No. 4 hold was 81 feet 0 inches (24.69 m) long, with a capacity of 89,370 cubic feet (2,531 m^{3}) and No. 5 hold was 75 feet 0 inches (22.86 m) long, with a capacity of 81,575 cubic feet (2,309.9 m^{3}).

In wartime service, they carried a crew of 62, plus 28 gunners. The ships carried four lifeboats. Two were powered, with a capacity of 27 people and two were unpowered, with a capacity of 29 people.

== Earlham Victory ==
Earlham Victory was built by Permanente Metals Corporation, Richmond, California. Her keel was laid on 3 May 1945. She was launched on 13 June and delivered on 10 July. Built for the War Shipping Administration (WSA), she was operated under the management of Alcoa Steamship Co. Laid up in Suisun Bay in 1948. Returned to service in 1966 due to the Vietnam War. Operated under the management of States Steamship Company. Laid up in Suisun Bay in 1973. Reported to be for disposal in 2004.

== Eastland ==
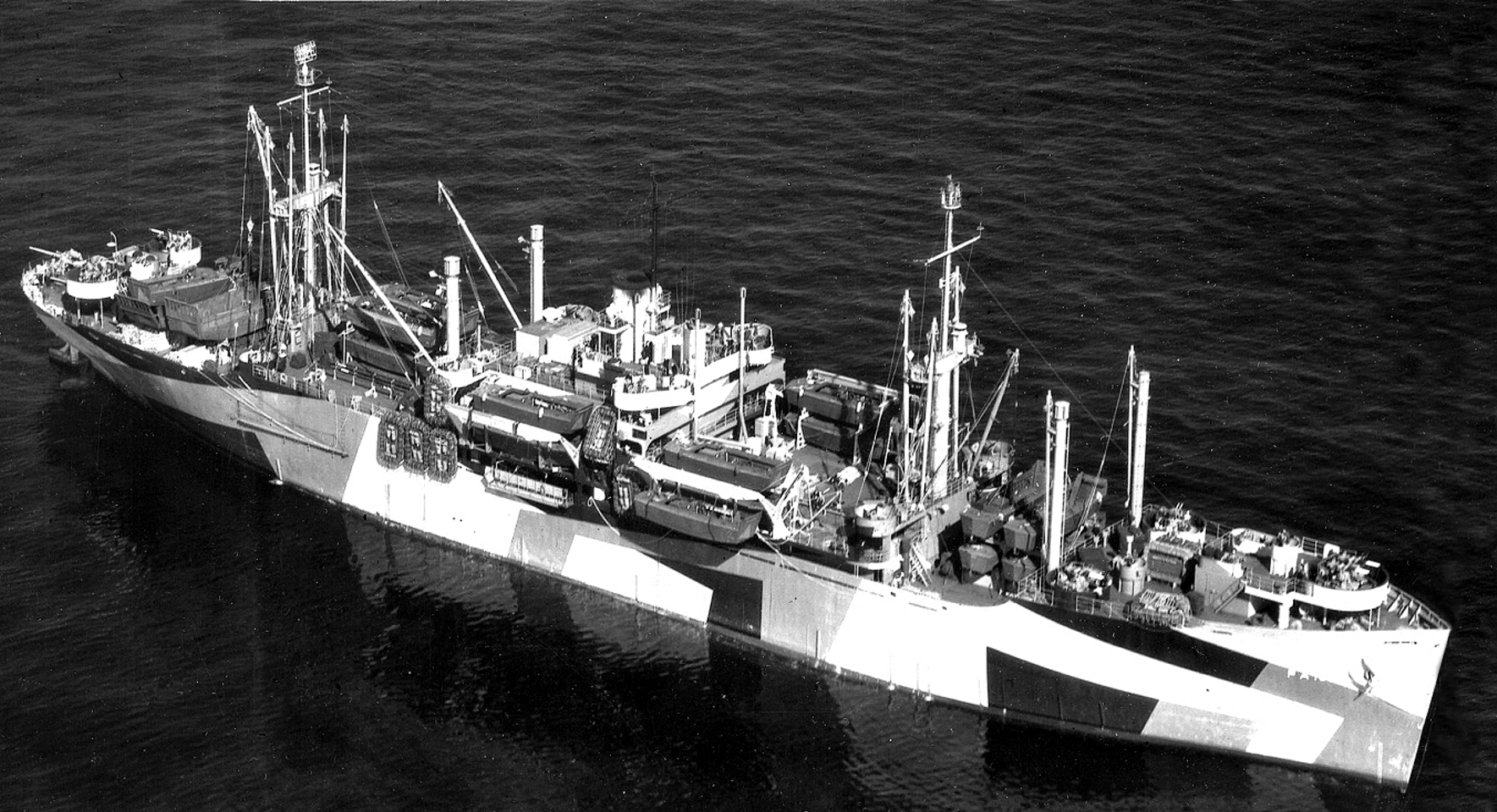
USS Eastland

Eastland was built by Oregon Shipbuilding Corporation, Portland, Oregon. Her keel was laid on 4 July 1944. She was launched on 19 September and delivered on 26 October. Built for the United States Navy. Laid up in the James River in 1946. She was scrapped at Brownsville, Texas in 1974.

== East Point Victory ==
East Point Victory was built by Bethlehem Fairfield Shipyard, Baltimore, Maryland. Her keel was laid on 5 February 1945. She was launched on 26 March and delivered on 20 April. Built for the WSA, she was operated under the management of Isthmian Steamship Company. Management later transferred to T. J. Stevenson Co. Laid up in the James River in 1947. Later transferred to Suisun Bay. She was scrapped at Oakland, California in June 1971.

== Edgecombe ==
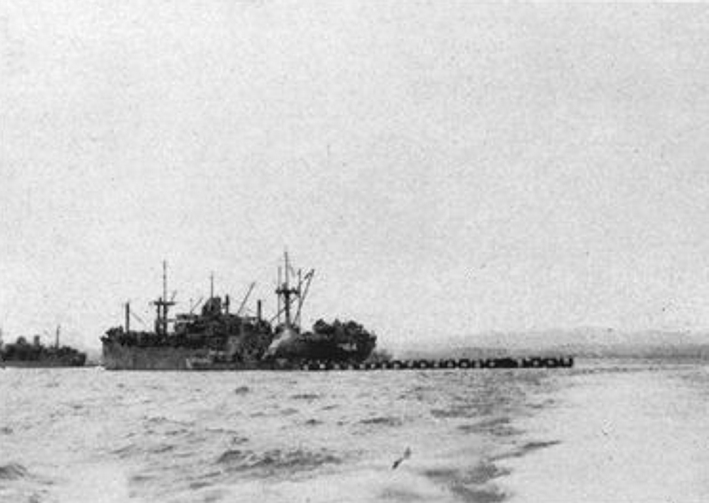
USS Edgecombe

Edgecombe was built by Oregon Shipbuilding Corporation. Her keel was laid on 11 July 1944. She was launched on 24 September and delivered on 30 October. Built for the United States Navy. Decommissioned in 1947 and laid up. To the United States Maritime Administration in 1959 and laid up in the James River. She was scrapped at Kaohsiung, Taiwan in 1988.

== Effingham ==
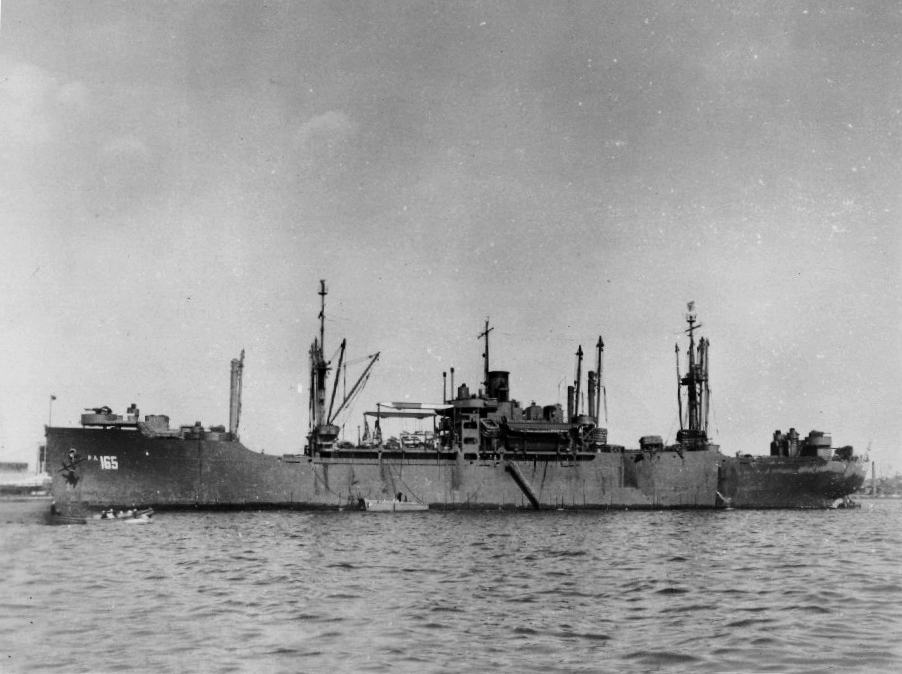
USS Effingham

Effingham was built by Oregon Shipbuilding Corporation. Her keel was laid on 19 July 1944. She was launched on 29 September and delivered on 1 November. Built for the United States Navy. To the United States Maritime Commission (USMC) in 1946 and laid up in the James River. She was sold to New York shipbreakers in April 1973.

== Elgin Victory ==
Elgin Victory was built by Permanente Metals Corporation. Her keel was laid on 13 October 1944. She was launched on 12 December and delivered on 18 January 1945. Built for the WSA, she was operated under the management of American-Hawaiian Steamship Company. To the United States Army Transportation Corps in 1947 and renamed Pvt Charles N. de Glopper. To the United States Maritime Administration in 1949 and laid up in the Hudson River. Later transferred to the James River. She was scrapped at Cleveland, Ohio in 1974.

== Elko Victory ==
Elko Victory was built by Permanente Metals Corporation. Her keel was laid on 11 October 1944. She was launched on 8 December and delivered on 29 December. Built for the WSA, she was operated under the management of Moore-McCormack Lines. Laid up in the James River in 1953. She was scrapped at Alang, India in 1994.

== Elmira Victory ==
Elmira Victory was built by Oregon Shipbuilding Corporation. Her keel was laid on 25 March 1944. She was launched on 12 May and delivered on 31 May. Built for the WSA, she was operated under the management of Alaska Steamship Company. Laid up in the Hudson River in 1949. Later transferred to Suisun Bay. She was scrapped in 1993, probably at a Chinese port.

== El Reno Victory ==
El Reno Victory was built by Permanente Metals Corporation. Her keel was laid on 15 November 1944. She was launched on 13 January 1945 and delivered on 7 February. Built for the WSA, she was operated under the management of American President Lines. Sold in 1947 to Panama Shipping Co. Inc., Panama and renamed Villar. Chartered to Lamport and Holt Line. Sold in 1949 to Koninklijke Nederlandse Stoomboot-Maatschappij, Amsterdam, Netherlands and renamed Bennekom. Sold in 1966 to Ithacamar Compania de Navigation, Monrovia, Liberia and renamed Ithaca Victory. Sold in 1968 to Venus Maritime Corp., Monrovia and renamed Venus Victory. She was scrapped at Kaohsiung in April 1970.

== El Salvador Victory ==
El Salvador Victory was built by Oregon Shipbuilding Corporation. Her keel was laid on 28 January 1944. She was launched on 1 April and delivered on 27 April. Built for the WSA, she was operated under the management of Seas Shipping Co. Laid up at Olympia, Washington in 1946. Sold in 1947 to Compagnie Maritime Congolaise, Antwerp, Belgium and renamed Lindi. Sold in 1961 to Compagnie Africaine de Navigation S.A., Antwerp. Sold in 1967 to Chinese Maritime Trust, Keelung, Taiwan and renamed Geh-Yung. Converted to a container ship in 1970. Now 7,634 GT. She was scrapped at Kaohsiung in 1977.

== Emory Victory ==
Emory Victory was built by Bethlehem Fairfield Shipyard. Her keel was laid on 13 February 1945. She was launched on 3 April and delivered on 6 October. One of a few Victory ships built as a motor vessel. Her diesel engine was built by the Nordberg Manufacturing Company, Milwaukee, Wisconsin. it was fitted by the Sun Shipbuilding & Drydock Co., Chester, Pennsylvania. Built for the WSA, she was operated under the management of United States Lines. Laid up in the James River in 1947. Returned to service in 1950 due to the Korean War. She ran aground at Cairnryan, United Kingdom on 28 December 1952, but was refloated later that day. Operated by the Military Sea Transportation Service. Laid up in Suisun Bay in 1953. To the United States Department of the Interior Bureau of Indian Affairs in 1962 and renamed North Star III. She operated in Arctic Alaska, serving remote communities that were not served commercially. Laid up at Bremerton Navy Yard, Bremerton, Washington in 1984. She was scrapped at Kaohsiung in 1991.

== Enid Victory ==
Enid Victory was built by Permanente Metals Corporation. Her keel was laid on 17 May 1945. She was launched on 27 June and delivered on 28 July. Built for the WSA, she was operated under the management of General Steamship Company. Laid up in the Hudson River in 1949. Later transferred to Beaumont, Texas. She was scrapped at Alang in 1993.

== Escanaba Victory ==
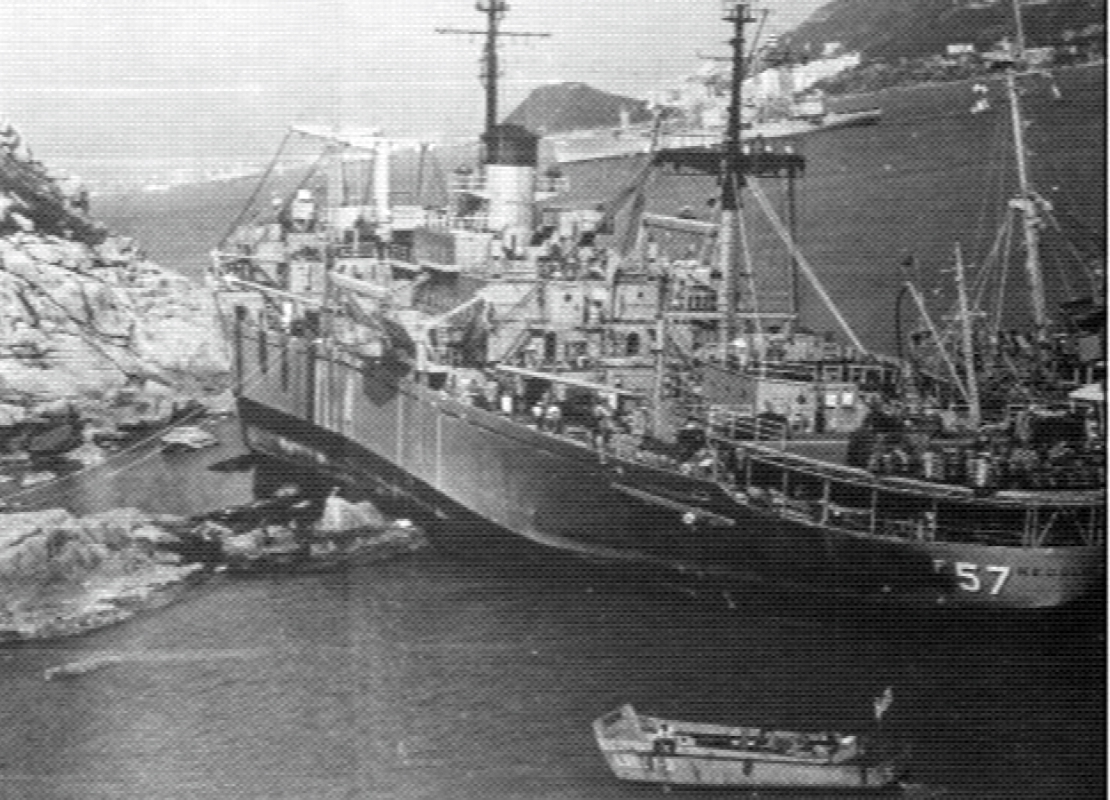
USS Regulus aground at Hong Kong, August 1971.

Escanaba Victory was built by Oregon Shipbuilding Corporation. Her keel was laid on 29 April 1944. She was launched on 7 June and delivered on 29 June. Built for the WSA, she was operated under the management of American South African Line. Laid up at Wilmington, North Carolina in 1948. Sold in 1950 to North American Shipping Co. To the United States Navy in 1952 and renamed Regulus. Converted to a refrigerated storeship by Todd Shipyards, Brooklyn, New York. Driven ashore on Kau Yi Chau, Hong Kong on 17 August 1971 during Typhoon Rose. Declared a constructive total loss, she was scrapped at Hong Kong in 1972.

== Ethiopia Victory ==
Ethiopia Victory was built by Permanente Metals Corporation. Her keel was laid on 20 January 1944. She was launched on 20 April and delivered on 17 July. Built for the WSA, she was operated under the management of Agwilines Inc. Laid up at Wilmington, North Carolina in 1948. To the United States Navy in 1965 and renamed Victoria. Laid up in the James River in 1984. She was scrapped at Kaohsiung in 1987.

== Eufala Victory ==
Eufala Victory was built a troop transport by Bethlehem Fairfield Shipyard. Her keel was laid on 23 October 1944. She was launched on 5 December and delivered on 31 December. Built for the WSA, she was operated under the management of United States Lines. Laid up in Suisun Bay in 1947. She was scrapped at Portland, Oregon in 1974.
