= USNS Marshfield =

United States Navy auxiliary ship

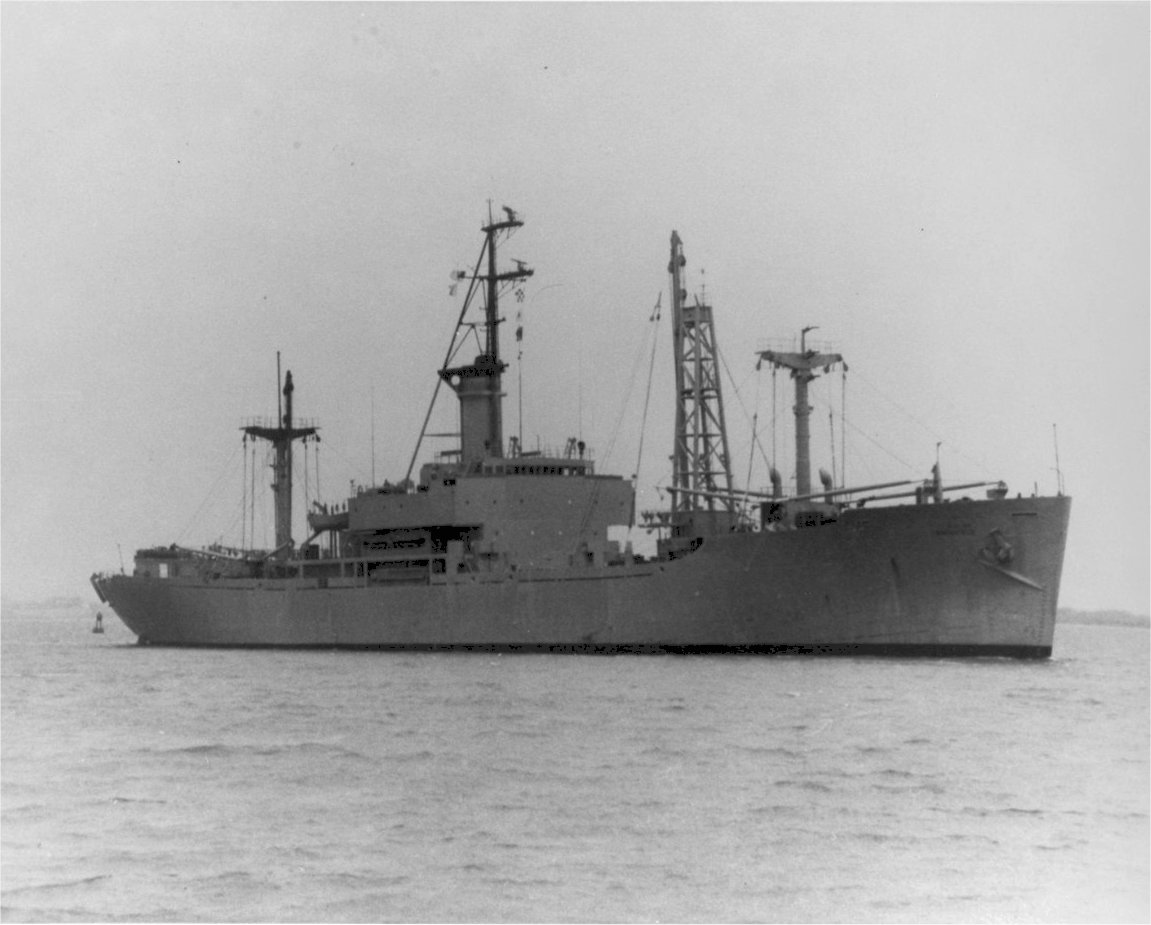
- USNS Marshfield (T-AK-282)

History

United States
- Name: Marshfield Victory
- Namesake: Marshfield, Massachusetts, Marshfield, Wisconsin
- Owner: War Shipping Administration
- Operator: American Export Line
- Ordered: as type (VC2-S-AP2) hull, MCV hull 106
- Builder: Oregon Shipbuilding Corporation, Portland, Oregon
- Way number: IMO 5226568
- Laid down: 1 April 1944
- Launched: 15 May 1944
- Completed: 7 June 1944
- Fate: Transferred to US Navy in 1968
- Notes: International Radio Call Sign: NIZX

United States
- Name: USNS Marshfield (T-AK-282)
- Operator: US Navy
- Stricken: 30 November 1992
- Identification: Hull symbol:T-AK-282
- Fate: Scrapped 30 June 2006.

General characteristics
- Class & type: VC2-S-AP3 Victory ship, then rebuilt in 1963 to USNS Marshfield (T-AK-282)
- Displacement: 4,512 metric tons (4,441 long tons) (standard); 15,589 metric tons (15,343 long tons) (full load)
- Length: 455 ft (139 m)
- Beam: 62 ft (19 m)
- Draft: 29 ft 2 in (8.89 m)
- Installed power: 8,500 shp (6,300 kW)
- Propulsion: 1 × steam turbine; 1 × shaft
- Speed: 15.5 knots (28.7 km/h; 17.8 mph)
- Complement: 12 officers; 87 enlisted
- Armament: 1 × 5 inch (127 mm)/38 caliber gun (Marshfield Victory only); 1 × 3 inch (76 mm)/50 caliber gun (Marshfield Victory only); 8 × 20 mm Oerlikon (Marshfield Victory only); None as USNS Marshfield

USNS Marshfield (T-AK-282) was a Fleet Ballistic Missile Cargo Ship, which was launched as a World War II commercial Victory cargo ship SS Marshfield Victory under the Emergency Shipbuilding program. The Marshfield Victory was acquired by the U.S. Navy in 1968.

== Victory ship built in Oregon ==
SS Marshfield Victory was laid down under U.S. Maritime Commission contract at Oregon Shipbuilding Corporation of Portland, Oregon on 1 April 1944; launched 15 May 1944; and delivered to her operator, American Export Line on 7 June 1944. In 1968 she was renamed the USNS Marshfield.

Marshfield Victory was one of many new 10,500-ton class ships to be known as a Victory ship, designed to replace the earlier Liberty Ships. Liberty ships were designed to be used solely for World War II, whereas Victory ships were designed to last longer and to serve the US Navy after the war. Victory ships differed from Liberty ships in that they were faster, longer, wider, taller, and had a thinner stack set farther toward the superstructure. In addition, they had a long raised forecastle.

== World War II service ==
SS Marshfield Victory was owned by the Maritime Commission, she served on the merchant sealanes under the control of the War Shipping Administration during the post World War II work. She was operated by the American Export Line. With the war over and her post-war work completed, on 17 August 1948 she was laid up in the National Defense Reserve Fleet at Wilmington, North Carolina.

== Korean War ==
On 25 August 1950 she was removed from the Reserve Fleet and serviced to return her to active duty for the Korean War. SS Marshfield Victory served as merchant marine ship, with the Orion Shipping and Trading Company supplying goods for the Korean War. About 75 percent of the personnel taking to Korea for the Korean War came by the merchant marine ship. On 10 October 1953 she was put into the National Defense Reserve Fleet at Olympia, Washington.

== US Navy ==
On 22 August 1968 she was transferred to the US Navy. She was refitted to be a Fleet Ballistic Missile Cargo Ship, to support Fleet Ballistic Missile (FBM) submarine tenders at Holy Loch, Scotland and Naval Station Rota in Spain. As a fleet ballistic missile cargo ship, she transported torpedoes, Poseidon missiles, packaged petroleum, and spare parts to deployed to the submarine tenders. She was placed into service with Military Sealift Command as USNS Marshfield (T-AK-282). Her regular assignment was the transportation of missile components and ship's stores from Charleston, South Carolina to submarine tenders at Holy Loch as an U.S. Navy auxiliary ship. USNS Marshfield had a newer design than the three previous Norwalk Class Cargo Ships, thus is sometimes put into a class of its own (T-AK-FBM).

== Inactivation ==
She was struck from the Navy List on 30 November 1992 and laid up in the National Defense Reserve Fleet, James River, at Fort Eustis, Newport News, Virginia. The Title was transferred to Maritime Administration (MARAD) on 8 May 1995. She was sold for scrapping on 8 November 2005 and scrapped by Bay Bridge Enterprises LLC, Chesapeake, Virginia, scrapping completed on 30 June 2006.

== See also ==
- List of Victory ships
- Liberty ship
- Type C1 ship
- Type C2 ship
- Type C3 ship

== Sources ==
- Sawyer, L.A. and W.H. Mitchell. Victory ships and tankers: The history of the ‘Victory’ type cargo ships and of the tankers built in the United States of America during World War II, Cornell Maritime Press, 1974, 0-87033-182-5.
- United States Maritime Commission: Victory Ships alphabetical list War II
- Victory Cargo Ships Oregon Shipyards Record Breakers Page 2
