= USNS Furman =

United States Navy auxiliary ship

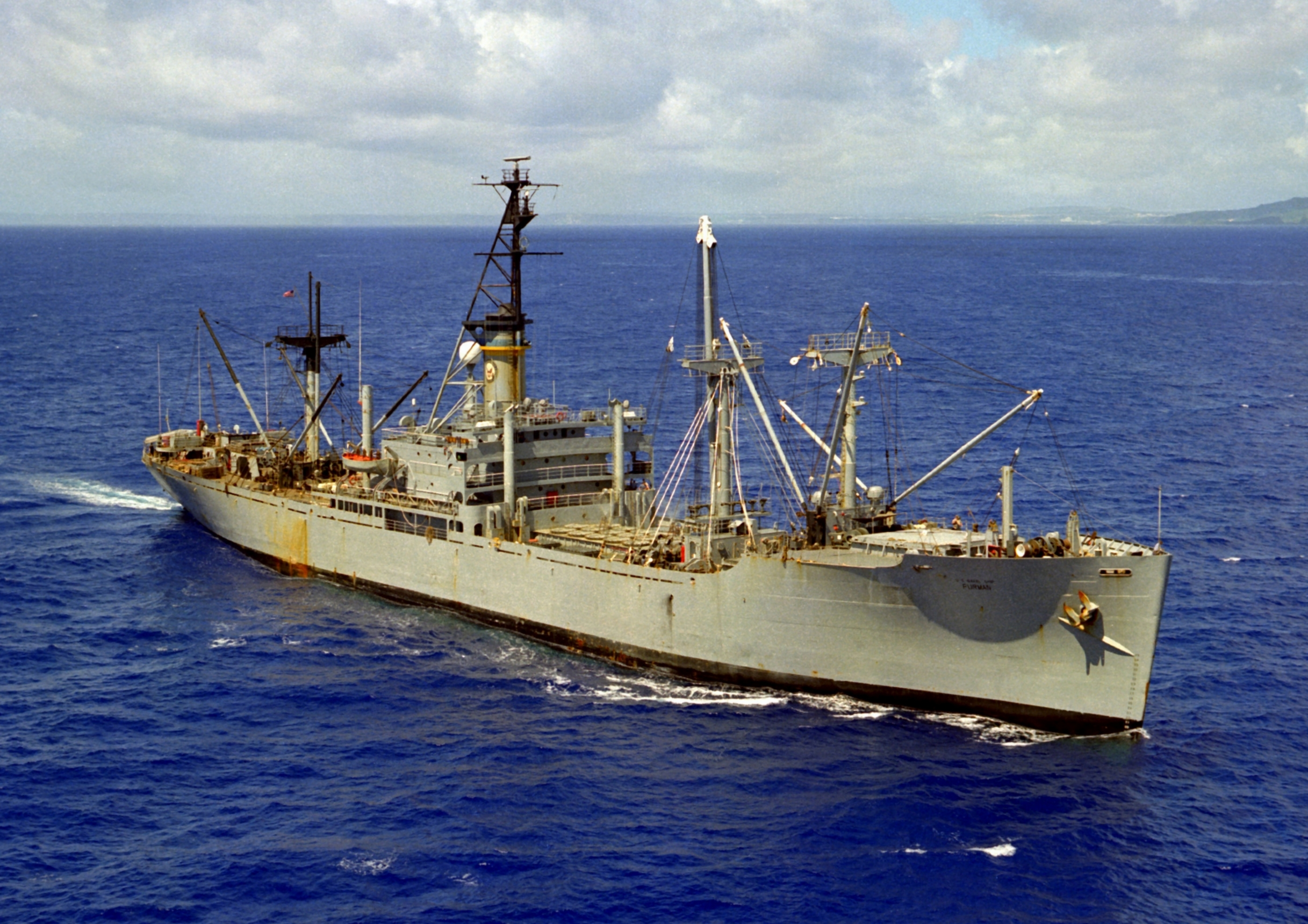
- USNS Furman (T-AK-280) underway off Guam 1981

History

United States
- Name: Furman Victory
- Namesake: Furman University
- Owner: War Shipping Administration
- Operator: American President Lines
- Ordered: as type (VC2-S-AP3) hull, MCV hull 174
- Builder: Oregon Shipbuilding Corporation, Portland, Oregon
- Laid down: 23 January 1945
- Launched: 6 March 1945
- Sponsored by: Mrs. Carl Donaugh
- Completed: 19 April 1945
- Identification: International Radio Call Sign: NMQQ
- Fate: Transferred to US Navy in 1963

United States
- Name: USNS Furman (T-AK-280)
- Operator: US Navy
- In service: 30 December 1963
- Stricken: 1993
- Identification: Hull symbol:T-AK-280
- Fate: Scrapped 30 April 2004

General characteristics
- Class & type: VC2-S-AP3 Victory ship, then rebuilt in 1963 to USNS Furman (T-AK-280)
- Displacement: 4,512 long tons (4,584 t) (standard); 15,589 long tons (15,839 t) (full load)
- Length: 455 ft (139 m)
- Beam: 62 ft (19 m)
- Draft: 29 ft 2 in (8.89 m)
- Installed power: 8,500 shp (6,300 kW)
- Propulsion: 1 × steam turbine; 1 × shaft
- Speed: 15.5 knots (28.7 km/h; 17.8 mph)
- Complement: 12 officers; 87 enlisted
- Armament: 1 × 5 inch (127 mm)/38 caliber gun (Furman Victory only); 1 × 3 inch (76 mm)/50 caliber gun (Furman Victory only); 8 × 20 mm Oerlikon (Furman Victory only); None as USNS Furman

USNS Furman (T-AK-280) was a Norwalk class Fleet Ballistic Missile Cargo Ship, which was launched as a World War II commercial Victory cargo ship, the SS Furman Victory under the Emergency Shipbuilding program. The Furman Victory was acquired by the U.S. Navy in 1963.

== Victory ship built in Oregon ==
SS Furman Victory was laid down under U.S. Maritime Commission contract at Oregon Shipbuilding Corporation, Portland, Oregon, 23 January 1945; launched 6 March 1945; and delivered to her operator, Northland Transportation Company, on 19 April 1945. In 1963 she was renamed the USNS Furman.

Furman Victory was one of many new 10,500-ton class ships to be known as a Victory ship, designed to replace the earlier Liberty Ships. Liberty ships were designed to be used solely for World War II, whereas Victory ships were designed to last longer and to serve the US Navy after the war. Victory ships differed from Liberty ships in that they were faster, longer, wider, taller, and had a thinner stack set farther toward the superstructure. In addition, they had a long raised forecastle.

== World War II service ==
SS Furman Victory was owned by the Maritime Commission, she served on the merchant sealanes under the control of the War Shipping Administration during the post World War II work. She was operated by the American President Lines. With the war over and her post-war work completed, on 4 November 1948 she was laid up in the National Defense Reserve Fleet in Mobile, Alabama.

== Korean War ==
On 11 August 1950 she was removed from the Reserve Fleet and serviced to return her to active duty for the Korean War. SS Furman Victory served as merchant marine ship, by the American President Lines, supplying goods for the Korean War. About 75 percent of the personnel taking to Korea for the Korean War came by the merchant marine ship. On 11 September 1953 she was put in James River Reserve Fleet.

== US Navy ==
On 18 September 1963 the USNS Furman (T-AK-280) was refitted to be a Fleet Ballistic Missile Cargo Ship at the American Ship Building Company of Toledo, Ohio, to support Fleet Ballistic Missile (FBM) submarine tender. USNS Furman was put in to service on 14 October 1964, having work completed on 14 September 1964. As a fleet ballistic missile cargo ship, she transported torpedoes, Poseidon missiles, packaged petroleum, and spare parts to deployed to the submarine tender. She was placed into service with Military Sealift Command (MSC) as USNS Furman (T-AK-280) on 30 December 1963. USNS Furman regular assignment into the 1970s was the transportation of missile components and ship's stores from Bangor Base, Washington to Apra Harbor, Guam, as a submarine tender, an U.S. Navy auxiliary ship. In April 1983, the USNS Furman was converted to a cable cargo ship at the Atlantic Drydock Corp. in Jacksonville, Florida. USNS Furman could hold 2,100 miles of new cable that it delivered to cable layer ships at sea. She operated out Newington, New Hampshire of

== Inactivation ==
She was laid up in temporary custody of the Maritime Administration (MARAD) in the Beaumont Reserve Fleet, the National Defense Reserve Fleet, Beaumont, Texas on 22 October 1986. She was struck from the Navy List in 1993. On 22 July 1993 permanent custody was transferred to Maritime Administration (MARAD).

== See also ==
- List of Victory ships
- Liberty ship
- Type C1 ship
- Type C2 ship
- Type C3 ship

== Sources ==
- Sawyer, L.A. and W.H. Mitchell. Victory ships and tankers: The history of the ‘Victory’ type cargo ships and of the tankers built in the United States of America during World War II, Cornell Maritime Press, 1974, 0-87033-182-5.
- United States Maritime Commission: Victory Ships alphabetical list War II
- Victory Cargo Ships Oregon Shipyards Record Breakers Page 2
