= USNS Victoria =

United States Navy auxiliary ship

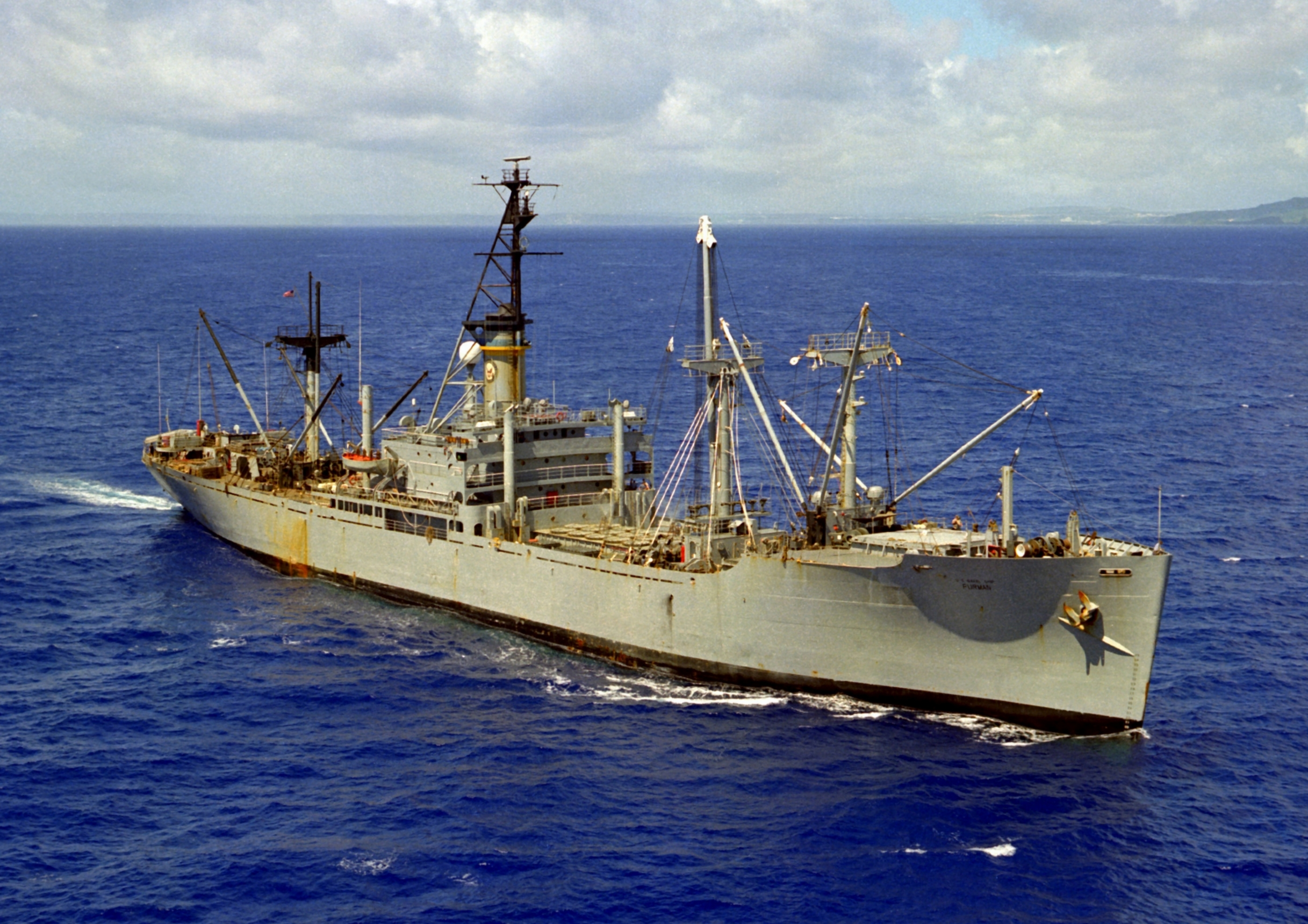
- USNS Victoria sister ship off Guam 1981

History

United States
- Name: Ethiopia Victory
- Namesake: Ethiopia
- Owner: War Shipping Administration
- Operator: Waterman Steamship Corporation
- Ordered: as type (VC2-S-AP3) hull, MCV hull 526
- Builder: Permanente Metals Corporation, Richmond, California
- Laid down: 20 January 1944
- Launched: 20 April 1944
- Completed: 17 July 1944
- Fate: Transferred to US Navy in 1964
- Notes: International Radio Call Sign: NMQQ

United States
- Name: Victoria
- Operator: US Navy
- In service: 22 May 1965
- Stricken: 31 March 1986
- Identification: Hull symbol: T-AK-281
- Fate: Scrapped 15 October 1987

General characteristics
- Class & type: VC2-S-AP3 Victory ship, then rebuilt in 1963 to USNS Victoria (T-AK-281)
- Displacement: 4,512 metric tons (4,441 long tons) (standard); 15,589 metric tons (15,343 long tons) (full load)
- Length: 455 ft (139 m)
- Beam: 62 ft (19 m)
- Draft: 29 ft 2 in (8.89 m)
- Installed power: 8,500 shp (6,300 kW)
- Propulsion: 1 × steam turbine; 1 × shaft
- Speed: 15.5 knots (28.7 km/h; 17.8 mph)
- Complement: 12 officers; 87 enlisted
- Armament: 1 × 5 inch (127 mm)/38 caliber gun (Ethiopia Victory only); 1 × 3 inch (76 mm)/50 caliber gun (Ethiopia Victory only); 8 × 20 mm Oerlikon (Ethiopia Victory only); None as USNS Victoria

USNS Victoria (T-AK-281) was a Norwalk-class fleet ballistic missile cargo ship, which was launched as a World War II commercial Victory cargo ship SS Ethiopia Victory under the Emergency Shipbuilding program. The Ethiopia Victory was acquired by the U.S. Navy in 1963.

== Victory ship built in California ==
SS Ethiopia Victory was laid down under U.S. Maritime Commission contract at Permanente Metals Corporation, of Richmond, California on 20 April 1944; launched 20 April 1944 at Kaiser Richmond No. 2 Yard; and delivered to her operator, Waterman Steamship Corporation on 17 July 1944. In 1963 she was renamed the USNS Victoria.

Ethiopia Victory was one of many new 10,500-ton ships to be known as a Victory ship, designed to replace the earlier Liberty ships. Liberty ships were designed to be used solely for World War II, whereas Victory ships were designed to last longer and to serve the US Navy after the war. Victory ships differed from Liberty ships in that they were faster, longer, wider, taller, and had a thinner stack set farther toward the superstructure. In addition, they had a long raised forecastle.

== World War II service ==
Ethiopia Victory was owned by the Maritime Commission, she served on the merchant sealanes under the control of the War Shipping Administration during the World War II work. She was operated by the Agwilines Inc. She took part in the Battle of Okinawa. At Okinawa, the Ethiopia Victory used its deck guns to defend herself and the ships around her. On 12 May 1945 she helped down a kamikaze plane which crashed into the battleship USS New Mexico. Ethiopia Victory was taken out of service on 10 August 1948. With the war over and her post-war work completed, on 28 July 1950 she was laid up in the National Defense Reserve Fleet in Wilmington, North Carolina.

== Korean War ==
On 24 August 1950 Ethiopia Victory was removed from the Reserve Fleet and serviced to return her to active duty for the Korean War. Ethiopia Victory served as merchant marine ship, by the American President Lines, supplying goods for the Korean War. About 75 percent of the personnel taking to Korea for the Korean War came by the merchant marine ships. Her next chartered operator was the Marine Navigation Company. On 4 September 1952 she was put in a Reserve Fleet at Olympia, Washington. On 26 March 1953 she was put back in operation with the Olympic Steamship Company. With the war over, on 6 October 1953 she was put in Hudson River Reserve Fleet. On 6 February 1957, she was reactivated and chartered by American Export Lines. On 25 September 1957, she was returned to the Hudson River Reserve Fleet.

== US Navy ==
On 18 August 1964 Ethiopia Victory was refitted to be a fleet ballistic missile cargo ship at the American Ship Building Company of Toledo, Ohio, to support fleet ballistic missile (FBM) submarine tender. Ethiopia Victory was renamed USNS Victoria on 22 May 1965. She was put into service in October 1965 as a fleet ballistic missile cargo ship, she transported torpedoes, Poseidon missiles, packaged petroleum, and spare parts to deployed to the submarine tender. She was placed into service with Military Sealift Command (MSC) as USNS Victoria (T-AK-281) on 30 December 1963. Victoria Her regular assignment remains into 1970 the transportation of missile components and ship's stores from Charleston, South Carolina to submarine tenders at Holy Loch as an U.S. Navy auxiliary ship.

== Inactivation ==
Victoria was taken out of service in 1984 and laid up in the Maritime Administration (MARAD) National Defense Reserve Fleet at the James River Reserve Fleet. She was struck from the Navy List on 31 March 1986. She was sold for scrapping on 15 October 1987 to An-hsiung-Iron Steel Company in Kaohsiung, Taiwan.

== See also ==
- List of Victory ships
- Type C1 ship
- Type C2 ship
- Type C3 ship

== Sources ==
- Sawyer, L.A. and W.H. Mitchell. Victory ships and tankers: The history of the ‘Victory’ type cargo ships and of the tankers built in the United States of America during World War II, Cornell Maritime Press, 1974, 0-87033-182-5.
- United States Maritime Commission: Victory Ships alphabetical list War II
- Victory Cargo Ships Oregon Shipyards Record Breakers Page 2
