= SS El Salvador Victory =

Victory ship

History

United States
- Name: El Salvador
- Namesake: Republic of El Salvador
- Operator: War Shipping Administration
- Builder: Oregon Shipbuilding Corporation
- Way number: 1011 (Oregon), 95 (MVC)
- Laid down: 28 January 1944
- Launched: 1 April 1944
- In service: 27 April 1944
- Out of service: 1946
- Fate: Sold, 1947

Belgium
- Name: Lindi
- Operator: Maritime Congolaise (1947–1961); Africaine de Nav. S.A. (1961–1966)
- Port of registry: Belgium
- In service: 1947
- Out of service: 1966
- Home port: Antwerp
- Fate: Sold, 1966

Liberia
- Name: Geh Yung
- Operator: Orient Overseas Container Line
- Port of registry: Liberia
- In service: 1966
- Out of service: 5 April 1977
- Home port: Keelung
- Fate: Scrapped

General characteristics
- Class & type: Victory ship
- Type: VC2-S-AP3
- Length: 455 feet (139 m)
- Beam: 62 feet (19 m)
- Installed power: 1 × steam turbine and double reduction gears (8,500 hp)
- Capacity: 7,634 (as container ship)
- Armament: 1 × 5-inch (13 cm) stern gun; 1 × 3-inch (7.6 cm) bow gun; 8 × 20-millimeter (0.79 in) anti-aircraft machine guns

SS El Salvador Victory was a Victory ship built in 1944 by the Oregon Shipbuilding Corporation. After World War II, El Salvador Victory was sold to a private company and renamed Lindi. She was later sold to Orient Overseas Container Line where she was renamed to Geh Yung and converted into a container ship. She was scrapped at Kaohsiung in 1977.

== Service history ==
El Salvador Victory was laid down by the Oregon Shipbuilding Corporation on 28 January 1944 with hull number 1011 in Portland, Oregon. On 4 February, the United States Maritime Commission informed the Salvadoran government of President Brigadier General Maximiliano Hernández Martínez that a ship had been named after the country, the Republic of El Salvador. El Salvador Victory was launched on 1 April and delivered on 27 April. During World War II, she was operated by the War Shipping Administration.

In 1946, El Salvador Victory was laid up in Olympia, Washington. She was sold to Maritime Congolaise in 1947 where she was registered in Belgium with a homeport in Antwerp and renamed Lindi. She was sold to Africaine de Nav. S.A. in 1961. In 1966, Lindi was sold to the Hong Kong-based Orient Overseas Container Line. She registered in Liberia with a homeport in Keelung and was renamed to Geh Yung. She was converted to a 7,634 gross ton container ship in 1970. She left commercial service on 5 April 1977, after which, she was docked at Kaohsiung, Taiwan and scrapped.

== Specifications ==
El Salvador Victory was a Victory ship, specifically a VC2-S-AP3 variant. She was 455 feet (139 m) long and 62 feet (19 m) wide. El Salvador Victory was powered by a steam turbine and double reduction gears that produced 8,500 horsepower. She was armed with one 5-inch (13 cm) stern gun, one 3-inch (7.6 cm) bow gun, and eight 20-millimeter (0.79 in) anti-aircraft machine guns. El Salvador Victory had the Maritime Commission Hull Number (MVC) of 95.

== See also ==
- List of Victory ships
  - List of Victory ships (E)
