= USNS Phoenix =

Cargo ship of the United States Navy

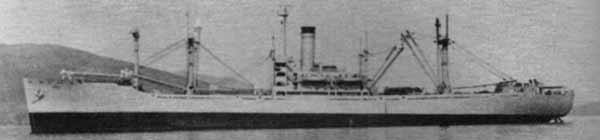

History

United States
- Name: SS Capital Victory, then in 1948 USS Phoenix
- Namesake: A mythical bird of ancient Egypt which, after living some 500 years, consumes itself in fire, only to rise again rejuvenated from its ashes. Also, Phoenix, Arizona, the State of Arizona's largest city and capital
- Builder: Oregon Shipbuilding Corporation, Portland, Oregon
- Laid down: 27 February 1945 as Capital Victory (MCV–183)
- Launched: 10 April 1945
- Sponsored by: Mrs. Chester It. Kinmon
- Completed: 8 May 1945
- Acquired: by the Navy on 25 November 1962
- In service: July 1963 with civil service crew
- Out of service: c. 1970
- Renamed: Arizona in 1948; Phoenix for Navy use on 20 November 1962
- Reclassified: AG–172 on 20 November 1962
- Stricken: 15 June 1973
- Homeport: Subic Bay, Philippines
- Fate: sold, 31 August 1973, scrapped in Kaohsiung in 1984.

General characteristics
- Type: Phoenix-class miscellaneous auxiliary
- Tonnage: 6,700 tons
- Displacement: 6,700 light; 14,900 tons full load
- Length: 436 ft 6 in (133.05 m)
- Beam: 62 ft (19 m)
- Draft: 28 ft 1 in (8.56 m) (max.)
- Propulsion: steam turbine, single shaft, 8,500hp
- Speed: 17 knots
- Complement: 50 officers and enlisted

USNS Phoenix (T-AG-172) was a Phoenix-class miscellaneous auxiliary acquired by the United States Navy in 1962, crewed by a civilian crew from the Military Sea Transportation Service, and sent to the Philippines to serve as a floating depot. Phoenix remained in the Philippines, issuing parts and other supplies, until the early 1970s, being struck by the Navy in 1973. She was built as a Victory ship for World War II as the SS Capital Victory under the Emergency Shipbuilding program for the War Shipping Administration.

== Victory ship built in Oregon ==
SS Capital Victory was laid down under U.S. Maritime Commission (MCV–183) on 27 February 1945 by Oregon Shipbuilding Corporation, Portland, Oregon; launched 10 April 1945; sponsored by Mrs. Chester It. Kinmon and delivered 8 May 1945 to the Alaska SS Company under charter with the Maritime Commission and War Shipping Administration.

== Assigned to the U.S. Navy ==
Renamed Arizona in 1948, the cargo ship was renamed Phoenix for Navy use 20 November 1962 and classified AG–172 the same day; acquired by the Navy from the Maritime Administration 25 November 1962; assigned to the Military Sea Transportation Service (M.S.T.S.) and crewed by the civil service in July 1963. She was the lead ship of three ships in this class.

== A floating depot ship ==
The special project ship, with Cheyenne (T-AG–174) and Provo (T-AG–173) was stationed in Subic Bay, Philippines as forward floating depots. The utility of such depots was demonstrated in 1964 by the excellent performance of these ships in Operation Quick Release.

In 1965 Phoenix began general cargo operation under Commander, M.S.T.S. in the Far East and with a Korean crew continued this duty until 1970.

== Inactivation ==
Phoenix was transferred to the U.S. Maritime Commission, and was sold 31 August 1973. She was scrapped in Kaohsiung in 1984.
