= USNS Provo =

Cargo ship of the United States Navy

History

United States
- Name: 1945 Drew Victory; 1962 USS Provo
- Namesake: Provo, a city in north central Utah, population 115,919, settled by Mormons in 1849.
- Builder: Oregon Shipbuilding Corporation, Portland, Oregon
- Laid down: 28 April 1945, as Drew Victory, MCV-691
- Launched: 17 June 1945
- Sponsored by: Miss Anna P. Burkhalter
- Completed: as Drew Victory, 14 July 1945
- Acquired: by the Navy on 2 March 1963
- In service: 20 November 1962 as USNS Provo (T-AG-173)
- Out of service: c. 1970
- Renamed: Provo, 20 November 1962
- Stricken: 15 June 1973
- Homeport: Subic Bay, Philippines
- Fate: Sold, 31 August 1973 and scrapped

General characteristics
- Type: Phoenix-class miscellaneous auxiliary
- Displacement: 6,700 ton light; 15,900 tons full load
- Length: 455 ft 3 in (138.76 m)
- Beam: 62 ft (19 m)
- Draft: 28 ft 1 in (8.56 m) (max.)
- Propulsion: steam turbine, single shaft, 8,500hp
- Speed: 17 knots
- Complement: 50 officers and enlisted

USNS Provo (T-AG-173) was a Phoenix-class miscellaneous auxiliary acquired by the United States Navy in 1962, crewed by a civilian crew from the Military Sea Transportation Service, and sent to the Philippines to serve as a delivery ship of parts and supplies to other Navy ships and stations in the Asian area. Provo remained in the Philippines, issuing parts and other supplies, until the early 1970s, being struck by the Navy in 1973. She was built as a Victory ship for World War II as the SS Drew Victory under the Emergency Shipbuilding program for the War Shipping Administration.

== Victory ship built in Oregon ==
Provo, a special projects ship, was laid down 28 April 1945; launched 17 June 1945 by Oregon Shipbuilding Corporation, Portland, Oregon; sponsored by Miss Anna P. Burkhalter; and delivered as SS Drew Victory 14 July 1945 and operated by the Weyerhaeuser Steamship Company. While in merchant marine service, she was subsequently renamed California and Utah.

== Assigned to the U.S. Navy ==
On 2 March 1963, she was acquired by the Military Sea Transportation Service (MSTS) from the U.S. Maritime Administration, and renamed Provo, 20 November 1962, with the designation of Special Project Ship (AG–173).

In July 1963, she and two other MSTS ships, Cheyenne and Phoenix, were stationed at Subic Bay, Philippines, as Forward Floating Depots. This mission concept involved the use of depot ships for floating storage and issuance of vital military materials in meeting contingencies. The operational application of the concept was tested in 1964 in operation “Quick Release.”

The ship acted as a point to point cargo carrier, delivering military supplies to Okinawa and Viet Nam from stocking points in Japan and Subic Bay.

== Inactivation ==
Provo was transferred to the U.S. Maritime Commission, and was sold 31 August 1973 for scrapping.
