= USNS Cheyenne =

Cargo ship of the United States Navy

History

United States
- Name: 1945 SS Middlesex Victory; 1947 SS Wyoming; 1963 USNS Cheyenne
- Namesake: An Algonquian tribe of Native Americans formerly roving between the Arkansas and Missouri rivers.
- Builder: Oregon Shipbuilding Corporation, Portland, Oregon
- Laid down: 8 May 1945 under U.S. Maritime Commission contract MCV-693
- Launched: 26 June 1945
- In service: February 1963 as USNS Cheyenne (T-AG-174)
- Out of service: date unknown
- Stricken: 15 June 1973
- Fate: Scrapped August 1973

General characteristics
- Type: Phoenix-class miscellaneous auxiliary
- Displacement: 6,700 tons light; 15,900 tons full load
- Length: 455 ft 3 in (138.76 m)
- Beam: 62 ft (19 m)
- Draft: 28 ft 5 in (8.66 m)
- Propulsion: steam turbine, single shaft, 8,500hp
- Speed: 17 knots
- Complement: 50 officers and enlisted

USNS Cheyenne (T-AG-174) was a Phoenix-class miscellaneous auxiliary acquired by the U.S. Navy in 1962, crewed by a civilian crew from the Military Sea Transportation Service, and sent to the Philippines to serve as a delivery ship of parts and supplies to other navy ships and stations in the Asian area. Cheyenne remained in the Philippines, issuing parts and other supplies, until the late 1960s. In 1966 she changed home port to Pusan Korea and was crewed by Korean merchant sailors. AT that time she was one of 4 cargo ships and 19 USNS LSTs operating out of the MSTS Office Pusan primarily providing support in the Viet Nam theater. Her master was a former ROK Navy captain, best known as "Speedy Pak". She was struck by the navy in 1973. (Korea information provided by the executive officer of the MSTS Office Pusan 1967–68.)

== Built in Portland, Oregon ==
Cheyenne was constructed as the Victory ship SS Middlesex Victory under U.S. Maritime Commission contract (MCV-693) at Oregon Shipbuilding Corporation, Portland, Oregon. She was launched on 26 June 1945 and renamed SS Wyoming in 1947. In 1963, she was placed in-service as USNS Cheyenne (T-AG-174), a Special Project Ship, crewed by the Military Sea Transportation Service with a civilian crew.

== World War II ==
For World War II the Middlesex Victory was operated by the Pacific-Atlantic Steamship Company under charter with the Maritime Commission and War Shipping Administration. She took needed supplies to troops. In 1948 she was sold to the States Steamship Company of Tacoma and renamed SS Wyoming.

== Vietnam War operations ==
DANFS has no information on the operation of this ship. However, a review of the history of USNS Phoenix and USNS Provo indicates her operations to be similar to theirs: acting as a point to point cargo carrier, delivering military supplies to Okinawa and Vietnam from stocking points in Japan and Subic Bay.

== Post-war decommissioning ==
Along with Phoenix and Provo, Cheyenne was struck from the Navy List on 15 June 1973 and disposed of by MARAD sale, 1 May 1973 and scrapped in August.
