= Long Range Shipbuilding Program =

The Long Range Shipbuilding program was implemented by the U.S. Maritime Commission shortly after its establishment in 1937 as part of the mandate of the Merchant Marine Act of 1936 which stated that:

United States shall have a merchant marine

(a) sufficient to carry its domestic water-borne commerce and a substantial portion of the water-borne export and import foreign commerce of the United States and to provide shipping service on all routes essential for maintaining the flow of such domestic and foreign water-borne commerce at all times

(b) capable of serving as a naval and military auxiliary in time of war or national emergency,

(c) owned and operated under the United States flag by citizens of the United States insofar as may be practicable, and

(d) composed of the best-equipped, safest, and most suitable types of vessels, constructed in the United States and manned with a trained and efficient citizen personnel. It is hereby declared to be the policy of the United States to foster the development and encourage the maintenance of such a merchant marine.

Prior to the passage of the act, the U.S.'s merchant fleet was primarily made up of ships which had been built as part of the Emergency Fleet Program at the end of World War I. Because of technological advances in hull construction and propulsion machinery, these ships were rapidly becoming obsolete and non-competitive in the commercial market and of limited value to the Navy as auxiliary support vessels. Additionally, U.S. shipyards had been suffering atrophy from more than 15 years of little to no new construction with either Navy nor commercial orders and it was felt that rebuilding the commercial shipbuilding capacity in the U.S. was in the nation's strategic interest.

== History ==
=== Pre-WWII years ===
In order to remedy this situation and to facilitate the mission given to it by the act, the Maritime Commission devised a program to build 500 new design merchant freighters powered with either steam turbines or diesels. The 500 total ships were to be built over a 10-year period and contracts for their construction went to both established and new shipyards on the East, West and Gulf Coasts. The new ships would be broken into two groups. First were those constructed to contracts placed by the individual shipping companies to their own designs but where the construction differential between a US and foreign yards to be subsidized by the Maritime Commission. The second group were ships built to standard designs of the Commission and where the contract for the construction of the ships would be to Federal Government's account. It was this shipbuilding effort which became known as the Long Range Program. It was intended that this latter group of ships would be chartered to commercial operators who would use the ships in peacetime but that the ships would be available for use by the Navy in wartime. These included the type C1 ships, type C2 ships and type C3 ships.

U.S. Maritime Commission C3 standard type cargo vessel

=== During the early years of WWII ===
Since war appeared to be drawing closer by the year, the Long Range Program grew in importance and in 1940 was accelerated to deliver more of the 500 planned ships sooner than originally scheduled. The fall of France in May 1940 was a watershed for the Commission and the Long Range Program for when Germany was able to move its U-Boat bases to the Brittany coast of France, the Battle of the Atlantic turned drastically against Great Britain's attempts to keep her supply lines open. With losses of merchant vessels far exceeding the ability to replace then in UK shipyards, the British Merchant Shipping Mission arrived in North America with the intention of ordering replacement cargo vessels in the U.S. and Canada. Permission to do so in the U.S. was sought and granted by the Maritime Commission for the U.K. to fund the construction of two new shipyards in South Portland, Maine and Richmond, California and for each to build 30 vessels to UK design. This was the genesis of the Emergency Shipbuilding program which would soon eclipse the Long Range Program in both scope and scale.

Although it was clear that the Emergency Program would be much larger than the Long Range Program, the Commissioners led by Admiral Emory S. Land fought to ensure that the smaller program not be allowed to whither to nothing. All five members of the Maritime Commission realized that the war would come to an end someday and the Liberty ships would not be capable of fulfilling what would be required of the postwar U.S. Merchant fleet. Although by mid-1941 ships were no longer being ordered by commercial operators, ships of the standard designs continued to be ordered by the Commission. As shipbuilding accelerated in 1941 with more ships being ordered for both the Long Range and Emergency Programs, by March 1942 the oversight of shipbuilding was decentralized by the Maritime Commission into four regional offices, one on each of the three seacoasts and the last for the Great Lakes region. With this move the Long Range Program was combined with the Emergency Program for the duration as both programs were supervised as one by the individual Regional offices.

=== As part of entire Maritime Commission wartime effort ===
With the combining of the Long Range Program with the Emergency Program, the specific type of ships which had been the foundation of the Long Range program continued to be built at the same yards which had been contracted for their construction and in only a few cases did yards built for the Emergency Program undertake building the standard types of the Long Range Program nor did the yards which had previously built vessels for the Long Range program get switched to Emergency vessel building. One instance where this was not the followed was when North Carolina Shipbuilding when it was switched from building Liberty ships to C2 type ships which it began to do in the summer of 1943. This decision came from an increase in propulsion turbines along with a high demand for the C2's from the Navy for use as auxiliary ships.

=== Post-WWII ===
One fundamental difference between the yards building for the Long Range Program as opposed to its larger brother, was that the yards of the Emergency Program were principally built with Federal funds only and that title to the yards resided with the Maritime Commission. Long Range Program yards had been from the beginning privately owned and although most received capital from the government during the course of the war to expand their shipbuilding capacity, the title to those yards remained in the hands of the corporations which owned them. Many of the yards which built for the Long Range Program continued to operate in the post war years. Not one of the Emergency yards continued to build or even to repair ships after the end of the war and most had been fully dismantled by the mid-1950s.

Since so many vessels had been built during the war years, in the postwar there was a great surplus of vessels available to both U.S. as well as foreign owners. There was subsequently, a drastic cut back in new merchant vessel construction after 1945 although a few ships were built under direct commercial contract. There was however plenty of work for shipyards to reconvert ships which had been originally built as cargo vessels but had served throughout the war as Naval auxiliary ships. Not until the 1950s was there a new Long Range style shipbuilding program undertaken by the Maritime Commission's successor agency, the U.S. Maritime Administration. That was for the construction of a number of C4 type cargo vessels which also were known as the "Mariner class". Those ships like their predecessors in the prewar Long Range Program were built to government contract and then chartered to commercial shipping firms or transferred to the Navy for use as auxiliaries.

== See also ==
- United States Shipping Board
- United States Maritime Commission
- Emergency Shipbuilding program
- War Shipping Administration
- United States Maritime Administration
