= USMS North Star III =

American Victory ship, built 1945

History

United States
- Name: Emory Victory
- Namesake: Emory University
- Owner: War Shipping Administration
- Builder: Bethlehem-Fairfield Shipyard Corp. Baltimore, Maryland
- Laid down: 1945
- Launched: 3 April 1945
- Fate: Transferred to the Bureau of Indian Affairs December 20, 1961

History
- Name: North Star III
- Owner: Bureau of Indian Affairs
- Acquired: December 20, 1961
- Renamed: North Star III
- Homeport: Seattle, Washington

History
- Owner: United States Department of Transportation
- Acquired: July 1989
- Homeport: Bremerton, Washington
- Fate: Broken up in 1991

General characteristics
- Class & type: VC2-M-AP4 Victory ship
- Tonnage: 7612 GRT, 4,553 NRT
- Displacement: 15,200 tons
- Length: 455 ft (139 m)
- Beam: 62 ft (19 m)
- Draught: 28 ft (8.5 m)
- Installed power: 8,500 shp (6,300 kW)
- Propulsion: HP & LP turbines geared to a single 20.5-foot (6.2 m) propeller
- Speed: 16.5 knots (30.6 km/h; 19.0 mph)
- Boats & landing craft carried: 4 LCMs

USMS North Star III (originally named MV Emory Victory (MCV-654)) was a Victory ship built in 1945. The ship was transferred to the Bureau of Indian Affairs in December 1961^{Note 1} for use in the Bureau's Alaska Resupply Program. She remained in service with the Bureau until 1984, and was scrapped in 1991. Unique among Victory ships, the North Star III was the only one equipped with diesel motors. All the other Victory ships used steam engines, powered by oil fired-boilers.

== MV Emory Victory ==
The MV Emory Victory was laid down in the Bethlehem-Fairfield Shipyard in Baltimore, Maryland in 1945. The ship was named for Emory University. After World War II, the ship was operated by the United States Lines Company for nearly two years before being placed in the reserve fleet at Lee Hall, Virginia

The Emory Victory was re-activated for, and saw service in the Korean War, moving military supplies for the Military Sea Transportation Service. During the war, the ship ran aground in December 1952, one-half mile (0.80 km) from the Scottish village of Cairnryan, where she intended to dock. She was refloated on the night of the 28th, and towed into port.

After the Korean War, the Emory Victory was placed in the Suisun Bay Reserve Fleet.

== USMS North Star III ==
Renamed the North Star III, the ship was operated by the Bureau of Indian Affairs as part of the Alaska Resupply Program. In this program, the ship shuttled manufactured goods, fuel, and other supplies from Seattle, Washington to remote Alaskan native villages. Due to the lack of other means of transport to and around some of these areas, the ship was also used by other government agencies, commercial operations, and missionaries for transport. Supplies and passengers were shuttled between the ship and native villages by the ship's Landing Craft Mechanized (LCMs). Additionally, the ships crew could be contracted to provide oil tank installation, electrical and radio repair work, plumbing services, and other similar services. The ship also carried tractors which could be used by the villages. In many cases, the ship was the only source of these services. As of 1975, the ship provided these services to approximately 70 native villages with a total population around 20,000.

The Bureau of Indian Affairs studied replacing the ship in 1975, which at that point had deteriorated significantly. The study concluded the Alaska Resupply Program should continue, as it was vital to the well-being of the villages that program supplied. It was recommended that a new ship specifically designed for the needs of the resupply program be designed and built, but if that wasn't feasible, the North Star III should be repaired and retained in service.

Ultimately, the ship remained in service until 1984.

== Fate ==
The USMS North Star III was decommissioned in 1984. She was laid up in the reserve fleet at Sinclair Inlet until 1991, when she was sold to a Chinese firm for scrap and was broken up at Kaohsiung, Taiwan that year. As of 1997, the ship's bell resided at Emory University.

== See also ==
- List of Victory ships

== Notes ==
^Note 1 : Some sources list the ship as being transferred to the BIA in 1962, however the United States Maritime Administration's status cards for the ship record a transfer date of 20 December 1961.
