= USNS Norwalk =

United States Navy auxiliary ship

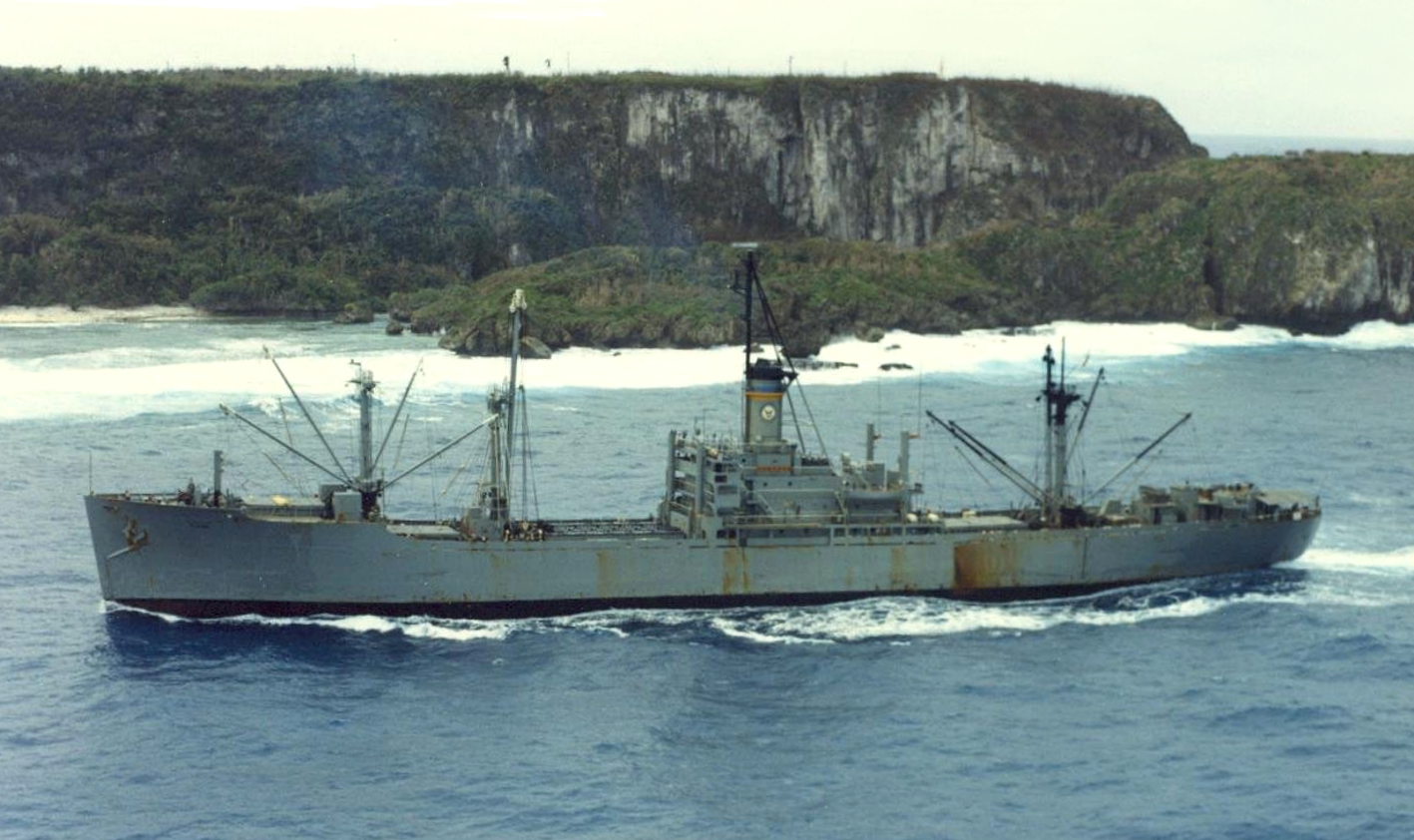
- USNS Norwalk (T-AK-279) in the 1960s

History

United States
- Name: Norwalk Victory
- Namesake: Norwalk, California
- Owner: War Shipping Administration
- Operator: Waterman Steamship Corporation
- Ordered: as type (VC2-S-AP2) hull, MCV hull 696
- Builder: Oregon Shipbuilding Corporation, Portland, Oregon
- Laid down: 19 May 1945
- Launched: 10 July 1945
- Completed: 7 August 1945
- Fate: Transferred to US Navy in 1963
- Notes: International Radio Call Sign: NCHI

United States
- Name: USNS Norwalk (T-AK-279)
- Operator: US Navy
- In service: 30 December 1963
- Stricken: 1 August 1979
- Identification: Hull symbol:T-AK-279
- Fate: Scrapped in 1973

General characteristics
- Class & type: VC2-S-AP3 Victory ship, then rebuilt in 1963 to USNS Norwalk (T-AK-279)
- Displacement: 4,512 metric tons (4,441 long tons) (standard); 15,589 metric tons (15,343 long tons) (full load)
- Length: 455 ft (139 m)
- Beam: 62 ft (19 m)
- Draft: 29 ft 2 in (8.89 m)
- Installed power: 8,500 shp (6,300 kW)
- Propulsion: 1 × steam turbine; 1 × shaft
- Speed: 15.5 knots (28.7 km/h; 17.8 mph)
- Complement: 12 officers; 87 enlisted
- Armament: 1 × 5 inch (127 mm)/38 caliber gun (Norwalk Victory only); 1 × 3 inch (76 mm)/50 caliber gun (Norwalk Victory only); 8 × 20 mm Oerlikon (Norwalk Victory only); None as USNS Norwalk

USNS Norwalk (T-AK-279) was the first in her class, a Fleet Ballistic Missile Cargo Ship, which was launched as a World War II commercial Victory cargo ship SS Norwalk Victory under the Emergency Shipbuilding program. The Norwalk Victory was acquired by the U.S. Navy in 1963.

== Victory ship built in Oregon ==
SS Norwalk Victory was laid down under U.S. Maritime Commission contract by Oregon Shipbuilding Corporation, in Portland, Oregon, 19 May 1945; launched 10 July 1945; and delivered to her operator, Waterman Steamship Corporation, on 7 August 1945. In 1963 she was renamed the USNS Norwalk.

Norwalk Victory was one of many new 10,500-ton class ships to be known as a Victory ship, designed to replace the earlier Liberty Ships. Liberty ships were designed to be used solely for World War II, whereas Victory ships were designed to last longer and to serve the US Navy after the war. Victory ships differed from Liberty ships in that they were faster, longer, wider, taller, and had a thinner stack set farther toward the superstructure. In addition, they had a long raised forecastle.

== World War II service ==
SS Norwalk Victory was owned by the Maritime Commission, she served on the merchant sealanes under the control of the War Shipping Administration during the post World War II work. She was operated by the Waterman Steamship Corporation for 6 months in 1945.

== War relief and Seacowboys ==
In 1946, after World War II, Norwalk Victory was converted to a livestock ship, also called a cowboy ship. From 1946 to 1947, the United Nations Relief and Rehabilitation Administration and the Brethren Service Committee of the Church of the Brethren sent livestock to war-torn countries. These "seagoing cowboys" made about 360 trips on 73 different ships. The Heifers for Relief project was started by the Church of the Brethren in 1942; in 1953, this became Heifer International. Norwalk Victory made six trips moving horses, heifers, and mules, as well as some chicks, rabbits, and goats. Her trips were to Greece, Poland and Yugoslavia from February 1946 to January 1947. In 1947 she was wrecked in the Schelde River, France; she was, raised, repaired, and put back into service.

With the war over and her post-war work completed, on 21 October 1947 she was laid up in the National Defense Reserve Fleet at the James River Reserve Fleet.

== Korean War ==
In 1950 she was removed from the Reserve Fleet at the James River Reserve Fleet and serviced to return her to active duty for the Korean War. SS Norwalk Victory served as merchant marine ship supplying goods for the Korean War. About 75 percent of the personnel taking to Korea for the Korean War came by the merchant marine ship. In 1957 she was returned to the James River Fleet.

== US Navy ==
On 10 October 1962 she was transferred to the US Navy. In New Orleans, Louisiana she was refitted to be a Fleet Ballistic Missile Cargo Ship, to support Fleet Ballistic Missile (FBM) submarine tenders at Holy Loch, Scotland and Naval Station Rota in Spain. As a fleet ballistic missile cargo ship, she transported torpedoes, Poseidon missiles, packaged petroleum, and spare parts to deployed to the submarine tenders. She was placed into service with Military Sealift Command as USNS Norwalk (T-AK-279) on 30 December 1963. USNS Norwalk made her first voyage early in 1964 to Holy Loch, Scotland. Her regular assignment into the 1970s was the transportation of missile components and ship's stores from a secret dock in Charleston, South Carolina to the submarine tenders at Holy Loch as an U.S. Navy auxiliary ship. The 16 Submarine-launched ballistic missile (SLBM) were stored in tubes in the ship's #3 cargo hold, just forward of the ship's bridge. The Norwalk Class Cargo ships had built-in mast, booms and derrick cranes and could load and unload their own cargo without dock side cranes or gantry if needed. Due to the mission of Norwalk Class Cargo ships, the ships when in use were rated Top secret, the highest level of classified information. The Victory ship's deckhouse was enlarged to accommodate additional auxiliary ship crew members: 9 to 11 officers and 136 to 155 enlisted men.

== Inactivation ==
She was struck from the Navy List on 1 August 1979. On 10 September 1979 she as laid up in the National Defense Reserve Fleet, James River, at Fort Eustis, Newport News, Virginia. The Title was transferred to Maritime Administration (MARAD). She was sold for scrapping on 8 September 1979, to Global Marketing Systems Inc. for $316.801.00 under MA contract # MA-12610.

== See also ==
- List of Victory ships
- Liberty ship
- Type C1 ship
- Type C2 ship
- Type C3 ship

== Sources ==
- Sawyer, L.A. and W.H. Mitchell. Victory ships and tankers: The history of the ‘Victory’ type cargo ships and of the tankers built in the United States of America during World War II, Cornell Maritime Press, 1974, 0-87033-182-5.
- United States Maritime Commission: Victory Ships alphabetical list War II
- Victory Cargo Ships Oregon Shipyards Record Breakers Page 2
