= Merchant Marine Act of 1936 =

US federal law

- Long title: An Act to further the development and maintenance of an adequate and well-balanced American merchant marine, to promote the commerce of the United States, to aid in the national defense, to repeal certain former legislation, and for other purposes.
- Enacted by: the 74th United States Congress

Citations
- Public law: Pub. L. 74–835
- Statutes at Large: 49 Stat. 1985

Legislative history
- Signed into law by President Franklin D. Roosevelt on June 29, 1936

The Merchant Marine Act of 1936 is a United States federal law. Its purpose is "to further the development and maintenance of an adequate and well-balanced American merchant marine, to promote the commerce of the United States, to aid in the national defense, to repeal certain former legislation, and for other purposes."

Specifically, it established the United States Maritime Commission, and required a United States Merchant Marine that:

- can carry all domestic water-borne commerce,
- can carry a substantial portion of foreign commerce,
- can serve as a naval auxiliary in time of war or national emergency,
- is owned and operated under the U.S. flag by U.S. citizens "insofar as may be practicable,"
- is composed of the best-equipped, safest, and most suitable types of vessels,
- consists of vessels constructed in the United States, and
- consists of vessels crewed with trained and efficient citizen personnel.

The Act restricted the number of aliens allowed to work on passenger ships, requiring that, by 1938, 90 percent of the crew members were U.S. citizens. Although about 4,000 Filipinos worked as merchant mariners on U.S. ships, most of these seamen were discharged in 1937 as a result of the law. The Act also established federal subsidies for the construction and operation of merchant ships. Two years after the Act was passed, the U.S. Merchant Marine Cadet Corps, the forerunner to the United States Merchant Marine Academy, was established.

U.S. Representative Schyler O. Bland of Virginia was known as the "father of the Merchant Marine Act of 1936."
