= Victory ship =

Class of US cargo ship, 1940s

- SS Red Oak Victory, now a museum ship

Class overview
- Name: Victory ship
- Builders: 6 shipyards in the US
- Operators: War Shipping Administration, United States Navy (attack cargo ships only) U.S. Maritime Commission
- Preceded by: Liberty ship
- Subclasses: VC2-S-AP2, Boulder Victory-class cargo ship
- Cost: US$2,522,800 (1943) (equivalent to US$36.47 million in 2024) per unit
- Planned: 615
- Completed: 534
- Canceled: 81
- Preserved: 3

General characteristics
- Class & type: Cargo ship
- Tonnage: 7,200 GRT; 4,300 NRT; 10,600 DWT
- Displacement: 15,200 tons (at 28-foot draft)
- Length: 455 ft (138.7 m)
- Beam: 62 ft (18.9 m)
- Draft: 28 ft (8.5 m)
- Depth of hold: 38 ft (11.6 m)
- Propulsion: Oil-fired boilers; Steam engine; Single screw propeller
- Speed: 15–17 knots (28–31 km/h; 17–20 mph)
- Range: 24,000 nm at 13 kn
- Boats & landing craft carried: 4 x lifeboats
- Complement: 90

The Victory ship is a class of cargo ships produced in large numbers by American shipyards during World War II. They were a more modern design compared to the earlier Liberty ship, were slightly larger and had more powerful steam turbine engines, giving them higher speed to allow participation in high-speed convoys and make them more difficult targets for German U-boats. A total of 534 Victory ships were built from 1944 to 1946.

== VC2 design ==
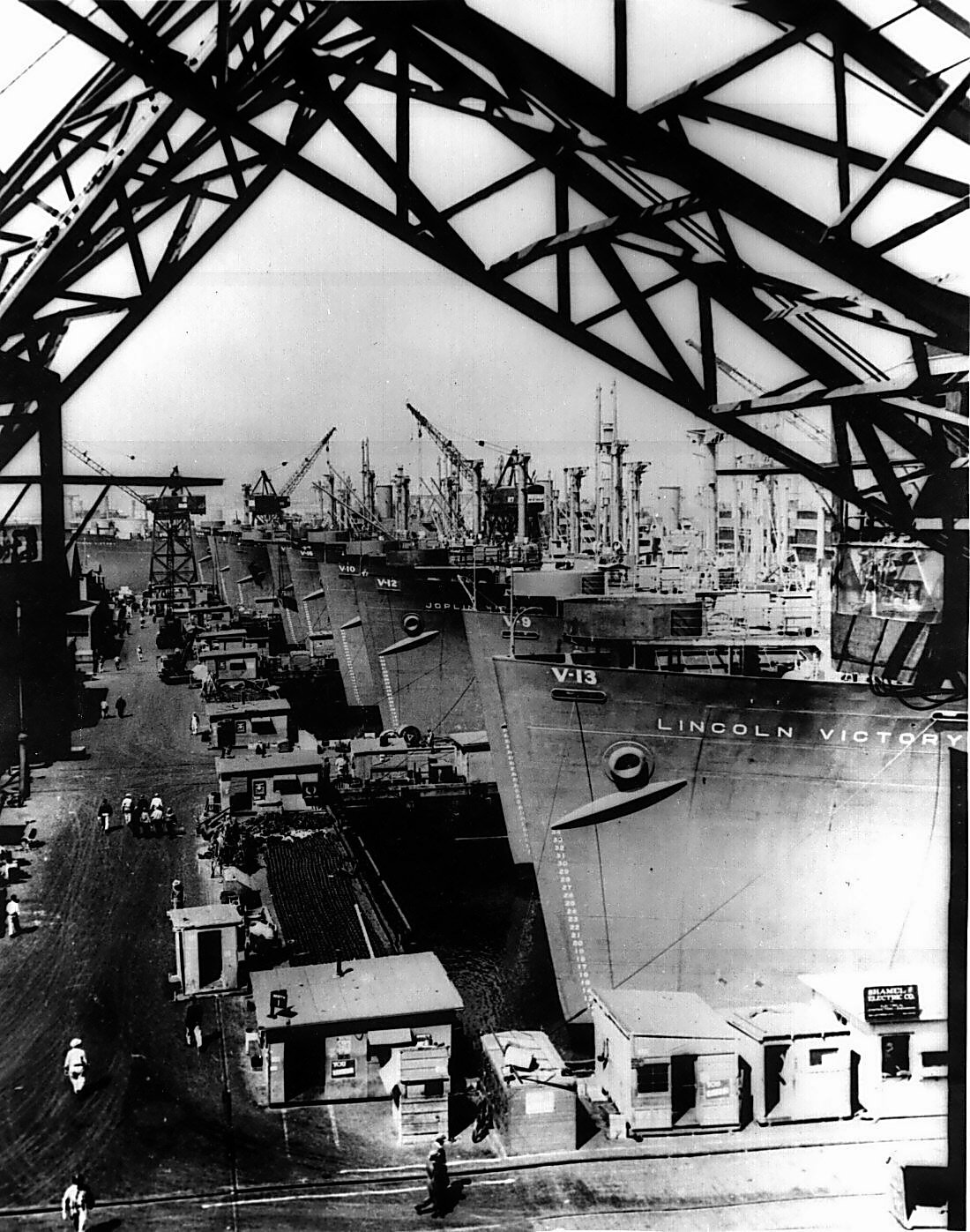
Victory cargo ships are lined up at California Shipbuilding Corporation in Los Angeles, California.

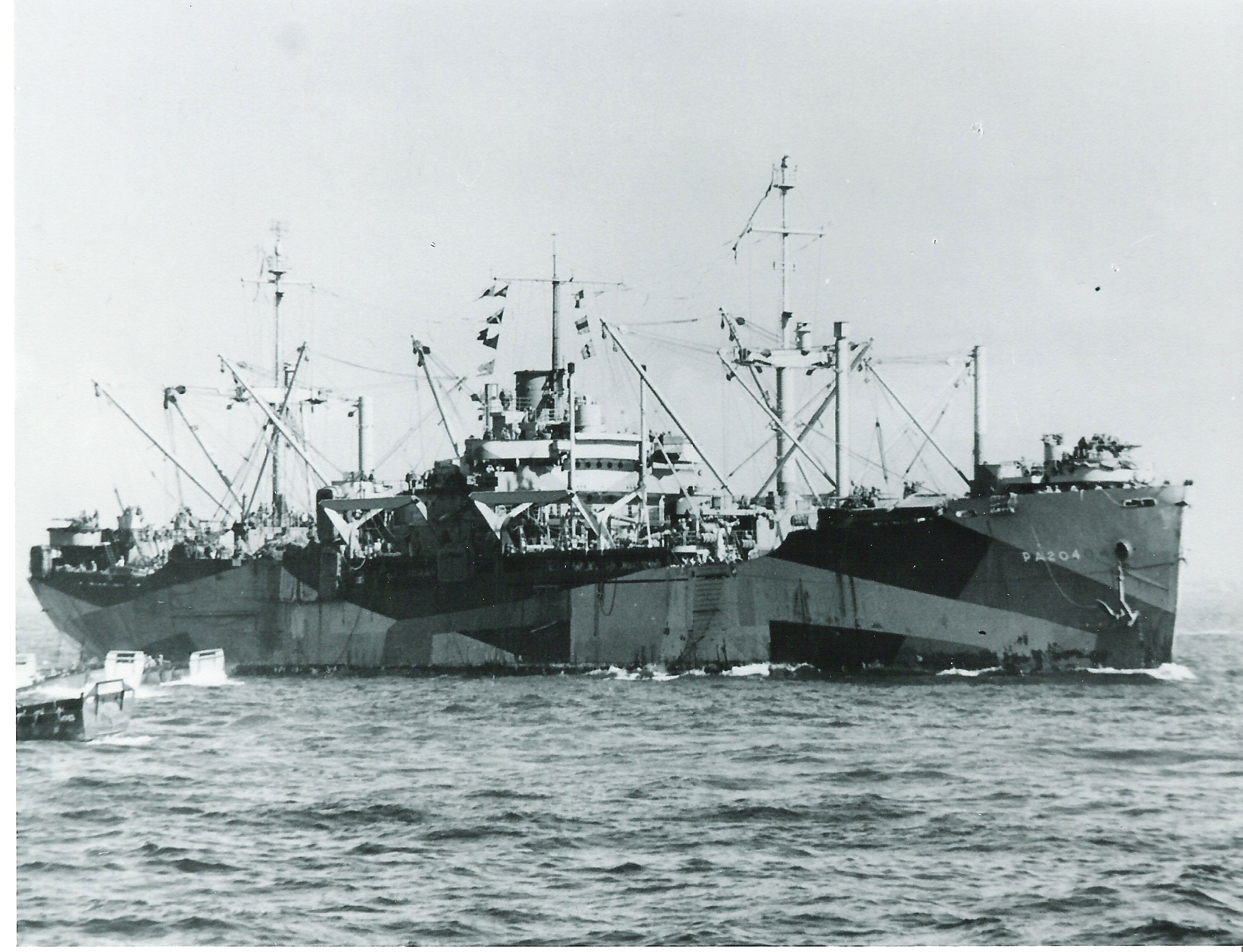
USS Sarasota at Lingayen Gulf on 8 January 1945

One of the first acts of the United States War Shipping Administration upon its formation in February 1942 was to commission the design of what came to be known as the Victory class. Initially designated EC2-S-AP1, where EC2 = Emergency Cargo, type 2 (Load Waterline Length between 400 and 450 feet (120 and 140 m)), S = steam propulsion with AP1 = one aft propeller (EC2-S-C1 had been the designation of the Liberty ship design), it was changed to VC2-S-AP1 before the name "Victory Ship" was officially adopted on 28 April 1943. The ships were built under the Emergency Shipbuilding program.

The design was an enhancement of the Liberty ship, which had been successfully produced in extraordinary numbers. Victory ships were slightly larger than Liberty ships, 14 feet (4.3 m) longer at 455 feet (139 m), 6 feet (1.8 m) wider at 62 ft (19 m), and drawing one foot more at 28 feet (8.5 m) loaded. Displacement was up just under 1,000 tons, to 15,200. With a raised forecastle and a more sophisticated hull shape to help achieve the higher speed, they had a quite different appearance from Liberty ships.

To make them less vulnerable to U-boat attacks, Victory ships made 15 to 17 knots (28 to 31 km/h), 4 to 6 knots (7.4 to 11.1 km/h) faster than the Libertys, and had longer range. The extra speed was achieved through more modern, efficient engines. Rather than the Libertys' 2,500 horsepower (1,900 kW) triple expansion steam engines, Victory ships were designed to use either Lentz type reciprocating steam engines (no ship built), diesel engines (one ship) or steam turbines (the rest, all oil fired) (variously putting out between 6,000 and 8,500 hp (4,500 and 6,300 kW)). Another improvement was electrically powered auxiliary equipment, rather than steam-driven machinery.

To prevent the hull cracks that many Liberty ships developed—making some break in half—the spacing between frames was widened from 30 inches (760 mm) to 36 inches (910 mm), making the ships less stiff and more able to flex. Like Liberty ships, the hull was welded rather than riveted.

The VC2-S-AP2, VC2-S-AP3, and VC2-M-AP4 were armed with a 5-inch (127 mm)/38 caliber stern gun for use against submarines and surface ships, and a bow-mounted 3-inch (76 mm)/50 caliber gun and eight 20 mm cannon for use against aircraft. These were crewed by United States Navy Armed Guard personnel. The VC2-S-AP5 Haskell-class attack transports were armed with the 5-inch stern gun, one quad 40 mm Bofors cannon, four dual 40 mm Bofors cannon, and ten single 20 mm cannon. The Haskells were operated and crewed exclusively by U.S. Navy personnel.

The Victory ship was noted for good proportion of cubic between holds for a cargo ship of its day. A Victory ship's cargo hold one, two and five hatches are single rigged with a capacity of 70,400, 76,700, and 69,500 bale cubic feet respectively. Victory ships hold three and four hatches are double rigged with a capacity of 136,100 and 100,300 bale cubic feet respectively. Victory ships have built-in mast, booms and derrick cranes and can load and unload their own cargo without dock side cranes or gantry if needed.

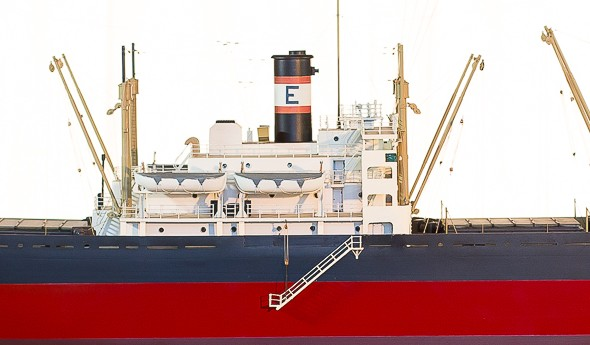
Model of a Victory ship's superstructure and center cranes. The engine room is located below the superstructure. This model is on display at the American Merchant Marine Museum in Kings Point, New York.

== Construction ==
The first vessel was SS United Victory launched at Oregon Shipbuilding Corporation on 12 January 1944 and completed on 28 February 1944, making her maiden voyage a month later. American vessels frequently had a name incorporating the word "Victory". After United Victory, the next 34 vessels were named after allied countries, the following 218 after American cities, the next 150 after educational institutions and the remainder given miscellaneous names. The AP5 type attack transports were named after United States counties, without "Victory" in their name, with the exception of USS Marvin H. McIntyre, which was named after President Roosevelt's late personal secretary.

Although initial deliveries were slow—only 15 had been delivered by May 1944—by the end of the war 531 had been constructed. The Commission cancelled orders for a further 132 vessels, although three were completed in 1946 for the Alcoa Steamship Company, making a total built in the United States of 534, made up of:

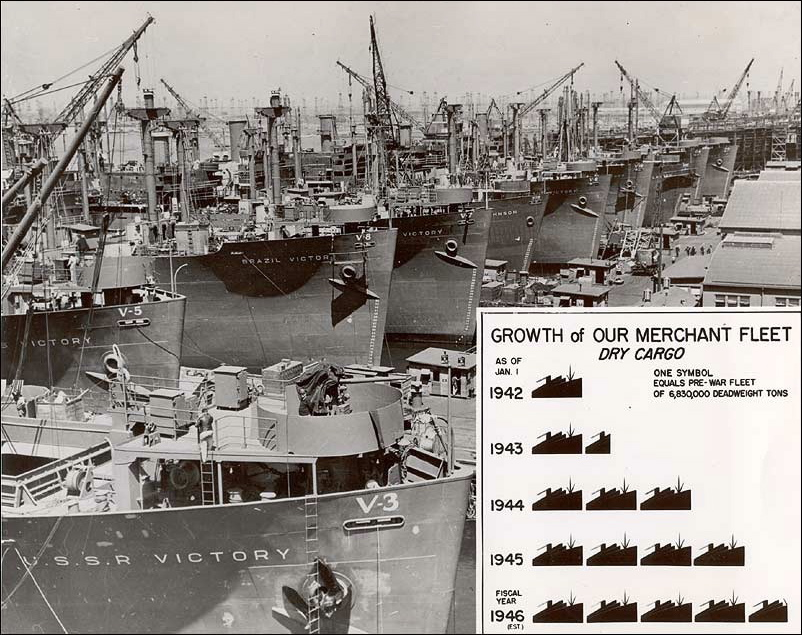
War Shipping Administration photo showing early 1944 Victory ship construction at California Shipbuilding Corporation with a May 1945 war tonnage production chart

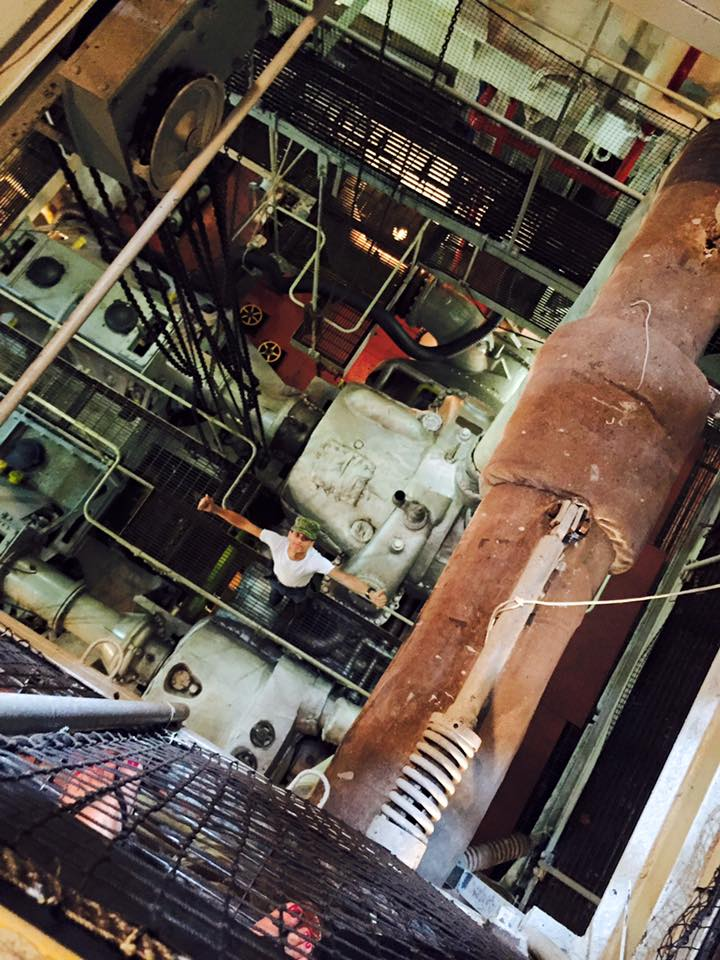
Victory ship engine room

US Victory ship production
Quantity Built	Type	Notes
272	VC2-S-AP2	6,000 hp (4.5 MW) general cargo vessels
141	VC2-S-AP3	8,500 hp (6.3 MW) vessels
1	VC2-M-AP4	Diesel
117	VC2-S-AP5	Haskell-class attack transports
3	VC2-S-AP7	Post war completion

Of the wartime construction, 414 were of the standard cargo variant and 117 were attack transports. Because the Atlantic battle had been won by the time the first of the Victory ships appeared none were sunk by U-boats. Three were sunk by Japanese kamikaze attack in April 1945.

Many Victory ships were converted to troopships to bring US soldiers home at the end of World War II as part of Operation Magic Carpet. A total of 97 Victory ships were converted to carry up to 1,600 soldiers. To convert the ships the cargo holds were converted to bunk beds and hammocks stacked three high for hot bunking. Mess halls and exercise places were also added. Some examples of Victory troopships are: SS Aiken Victory, SS Chanute Victory, SS Cody Victory, SS Colby Victory, SS Cranston Victory, SS Gustavus Victory, SS Hagerstown Victory, SS Maritime Victory, and SS U.S.S.R. Victory.

Some 184 Victory ships served in the Korean War and a 100 Victory ships served in the Vietnam War. Many were sold and became commercial cargo ships and a few commercial passenger ships. Some were laid up in the United States Navy reserve fleets and then scrapped or reused. Many saw postwar conversion and various uses for years afterward. The single VC2-M-AP4 Diesel-powered MV Emory Victory operated in Alaskan waters for the Bureau of Indian Affairs as North Star III. AP3 types South Bend Victory and Tuskegee Victory were converted in 1957–58 to ocean hydrographic surveying ships USNS Bowditch and Dutton, respectively. Dutton aided in locating the lost hydrogen bomb following the 1966 Palomares B-52 crash.

Starting in 1959, several were removed from the reserve fleet and refitted for the National Aeronautics and Space Administration. One such ship was SS Kingsport Victory, which was renamed USNS Kingsport and converted into the world's first satellite communications ship. Another was the former Haiti Victory, which recovered the first man-made object to return from orbit, the nose cone of Discoverer 13, on 11 August 1960. USS Sherburne was converted in 1969–1970 to the range instrumentation ship USNS Range Sentinel for downrange tracking of ballistic missile tests.

Four Victory ships became fleet ballistic missile cargo ships transporting torpedoes, Poseidon missiles, packaged petroleum, and spare parts to deployed submarine tenders:

- USNS Norwalk, built as SS Norwalk Victory
- USNS Furman, built as SS Furman Victory
- USNS Victoria, built as SS Ethiopia Victory
- USNS Marshfield, built as SS Marshfield Victory

In the 1960s two Victory ships were reactivated and converted to technical research ships by the U.S. Navy with the hull type AGTR. SS Iran Victory became USS Belmont and SS Simmons Victory became USS Liberty. Liberty was attacked and severely damaged by Israeli forces in June 1967 and subsequently decommissioned and struck from the Naval Register. Belmont was decommissioned and stricken in 1970. Baton Rouge Victory was sunk in the Mekong delta by a Viet Cong mine in August 1966 and temporarily blocked the channel to Saigon.

=== Cost ===
According to the War Production Board minutes in 1943, the Victory Ship had a relative cost of $238 per deadweight ton (10,500 deadweight tonnage) for $2,522,800, equivalent to $36,500,000 in 2024.

=== Shipyards ===
Most Victory ships were constructed in five West Coast and one Baltimore emergency shipyards that were set up in World War II to build Liberty, Victory, and other ships. The Victory ship was designed to be able to be assembled by the smallest capacity crane at these shipyards.

US shipyard production of Victory ships
Shipyard	Location	Quantity Yard	Type	Quantity Type	MCV Hull Numbers	Notes
Bethlehem Fairfield	Baltimore, Maryland	94	VC2-S-AP2	93	602–653, 816–856	23 more cancelled
Bethlehem Fairfield	Baltimore, Maryland	94	VC2-M-AP4	1	654	Diesel engine variant
California Shipbuilding	Wilmington, California	131	VC2-S-AP3	32	1–24, 27, 29, 31–33, 37, 41, 42	
California Shipbuilding	Wilmington, California	131	VC2-S-AP5	30	25, 26, 28, 30, 34–36, 38–40, 43–62	63–66 Transferred to Vancouver as 812–815
California Shipbuilding	Wilmington, California	131	VC2-S-AP2	69	67–84, 767–811, 885–890	10 more cancelled
Kaiser Vancouver Shipyard	Vancouver, Washington	31	VC2-S-AP5	31	655–681, 812–815	17 more cancelled
Oregon Shipbuilding	Portland, Oregon	136	VC2-S-AP3	99	85–116, 147–189, 682–701, 872–875	19 more cancelled
Oregon Shipbuilding	Portland, Oregon	136	VC2-S-AP5	34	117–146, 860–863	12 more cancelled
Oregon Shipbuilding	Portland, Oregon	136	VC2-S-AP7	1	866	Originally AP5
Oregon Shipbuilding	Portland, Oregon	136	VC2-S1-AP7	2	876, 877	Originally AP3
Kaiser Richmond No. 1 Yard	Richmond, California	53	VC2-S-AP3	10	525–534	
Kaiser Richmond No. 1 Yard	Richmond, California	53	VC2-S-AP2	43	535–550, 581–596, 702–711	
Kaiser Richmond No. 2 Yard	Richmond, California	89	VC2-S-AP5	22	552–573	
Kaiser Richmond No. 2 Yard	Richmond, California	89	VC2-S-AP2	67	574–580, 597–601, 712–766	

== Ships in class ==
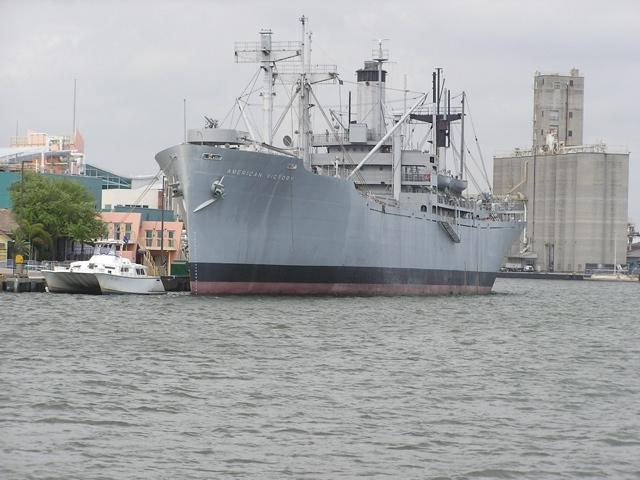
SS American Victory in Tampa, Florida

- United States Merchant Marine, 414 SS Victory cargo ships. World War II, some used in the Korean War and Vietnam War.
  - 97 Victory ships temporarily converted to World War II troopship.
  - One ship SS Pratt Victory with engineering spaces converted to uncrewed operation and used with a reduced Navy crew as a temporary minesweeper in 1945 and 1946.
  - Seagoing cowboys ships, 1946 to 1947 temporary conversion of 46 Merchant Marine Victory ships to transport relief livestock.
- US Navy conversions
  - Haskell-class attack transports (APA), 117 built.
  - Boulder Victory-class cargo ships (AK), 20 built.
  - Greenville Victory-class cargo ships (AK), 9 Victory ships under US Navy ownership for Korean War.
  - Lt. James E. Robinson-class aircraft transports (AKV), 1950 conversion of two ships: USNS Lt. James E. Robinson and USNS Sgt. Jack J. Pendleton
  - Denebola-class stores ships (AF), 3 Victory ships that came under US Navy ownership in 1952: USS Denebola, USS Regulus and USNS Perseus. A fourth ship, USNS Asterion, would be converted to this class in 1961.
  - Bowditch-class survey ships (AGS), 1957 conversion of 3 ships: Bowditch, Dutton, Michelson.
  - Phoenix-class auxiliary ships (AG), 1960 3 US Navy Forward Floating Depots: Phoenix, Provo and Cheyenne, at Subic Bay, Philippines.
  - Watertown-class missile range instrumentation ships (T-AGM), 1960 conversion of 3 ships: Watertown, Huntsville and Wheeling
  - Longview-class missile range instrumentation ships (T-AGM), 1960 conversion of 3 ships: Longview, Private Joe E. Mann and Dalton Victory
  - Kingsport telemetry ship (AG), 1961 conversion of one ship, USNS Kingsport.
  - Belmont-class technical research ships (AGTR), 1963 conversion of 2 ships for Sigint: USS Belmont and USS Liberty
  - Norwalk class ballistic missile submarine support cargo ships (AK), four converted in 1963: T-AK-279, T-AK-280, T-AK-281, T-AK-282
  - Range Sentinel telemetry ship (AGM), 1971 conversion of one ship: USS Sherburne

== Survivors ==
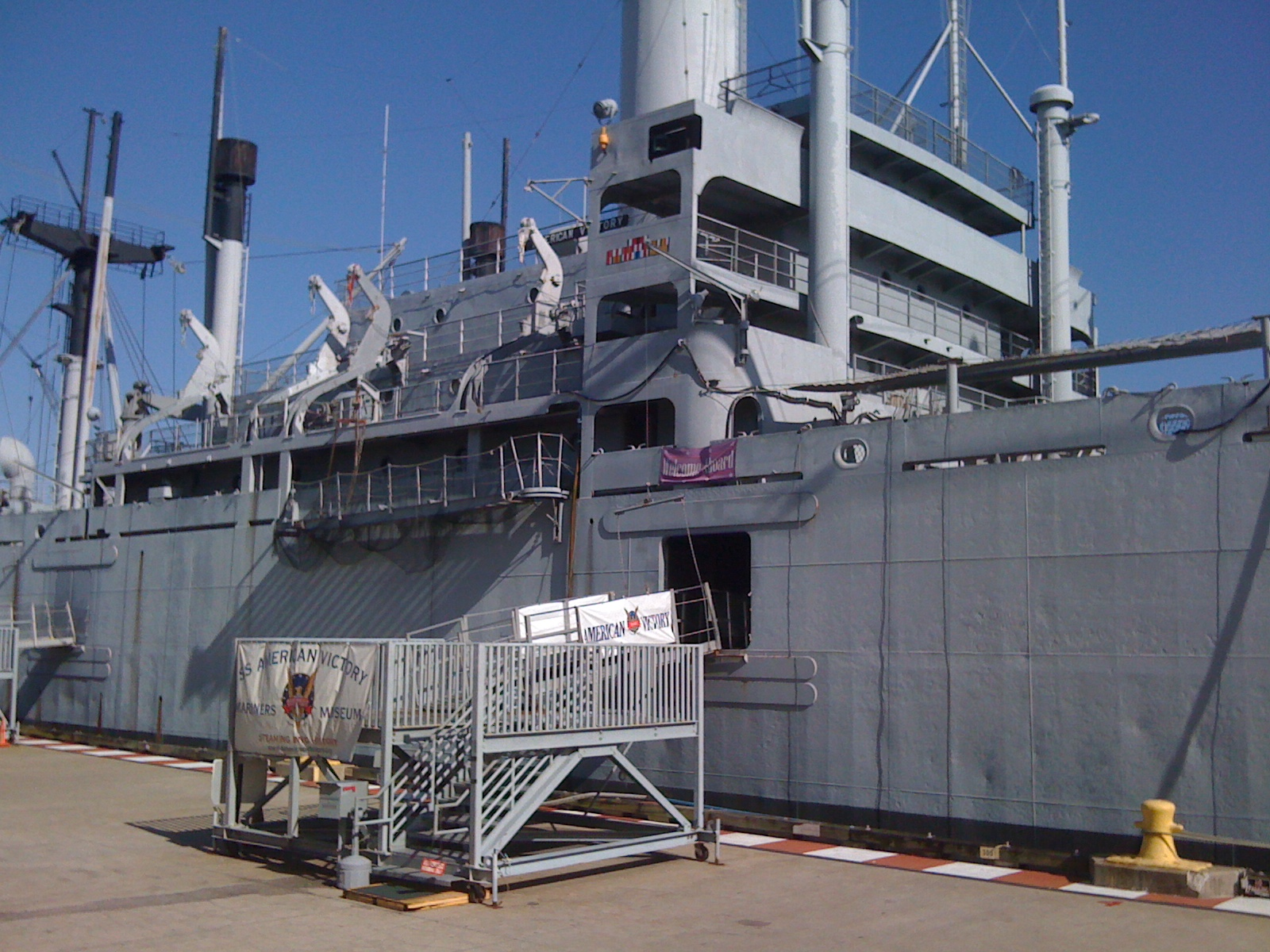
SS American Victory ship starboard superstructure

Three are preserved as museum ships:

- SS American Victory (Tampa, Florida)
- SS Lane Victory (Los Angeles, California)
- SS Red Oak Victory (Richmond, California)

== See also ==
- Empire ships
- Liberty ship
- List of Victory ships
- Port Chicago disaster
- T2 tanker
- Type C1 ship
- Type C2 ship
- Type C3 ship
- U.S. Merchant Marine Academy
- Murmansk Run
- World War II United States Merchant Navy
- Away All Boats about Victory Attack transport
- USMS North Star III
