= Emergency Shipbuilding Program =

Programme for emergent ship production

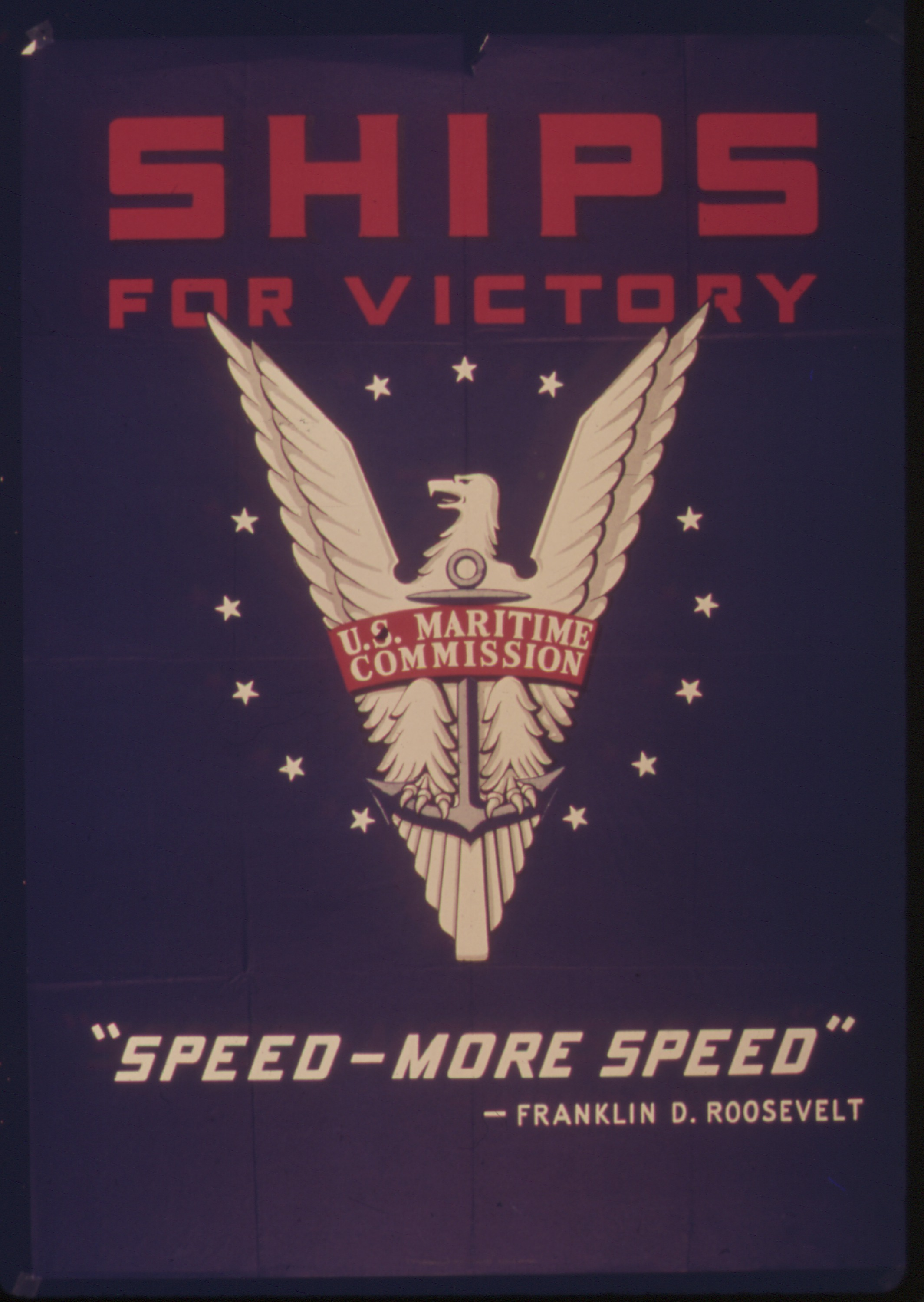
U.S. Maritime Commission "Ships for Victory" emblem

The Emergency Shipbuilding Program (late 1940 – September 1945) was a United States government effort to quickly build simple cargo ships to carry troops and materiel to allies and foreign theatres during World War II. Run by the U.S. Maritime Commission, the program built almost 6,000 ships.

== Origins ==
By the fall of 1940, the fleet of the British Merchant Navy (equivalent to the United States Merchant Marine) was being sunk in the Battle of the Atlantic by Germany's U-boats faster than the United Kingdom could replace them. Led by Sir Arthur Salter, a group of men called the British Merchant Shipping Mission came to North America from the UK to enlist U.S. and Canadian shipbuilders to construct merchant ships. As all existing U.S. shipyards capable of constructing ocean-going merchant ships were already occupied by either building ships for the U.S. Navy or for the U.S. Maritime Commission's Long Range Shipbuilding Program, which had begun three years previously to fulfill the goals set forth in the Merchant Marine Act of 1936, the mission negotiated with a consortium of companies made up of the existing U.S. ship repairer Todd Shipyards, which had its headquarters in New York City in league with the shipbuilder Bath Iron Works located in Bath, Maine.

The new yard, called the Todd-Bath Iron Shipbuilding Corporation, was to be an entirely new facility located on a piece of mostly vacant land located adjacent to Cummings Point in South Portland, Maine, for the purpose of building 30 cargo ships. The mission, likewise, negotiated with a different consortium made up of Todd along with a group of heavy construction companies in the Western U.S. for the building of a new shipyard in the San Francisco Bay area for construction of 30 ships identical to those to be built in Maine.

That yard was to be called the Todd-California Shipbuilding Corp. It was slated to be built on the tide flats of Richmond on the east side of the bay. The construction companies that made up the second half of that corporation had no experience building ships, but did have an extensive resume with the construction of highways, bridges, and major public-works projects such as the Hoover Dam, the Bonneville Dam, and the massive Grand Coulee Dam. Known as the Six Companies, the members included two companies that were to become driving powers in wartime merchant shipbuilding during the ensuing years, and the men behind those companies were Henry J. Kaiser, who headed the Kaiser Companies, and John A. McCone, who led the Bechtel/McCone Company.

Contracts for both yards and the ships were signed on December 20, 1940. All the ships to be built were collectively called the Ocean class and to be of an existing British design for five-hatch cargo ships of about 10,000 tons' load displacement and 11 knots' service speed using obsolete, but readily available, triple-expansion, reciprocating steam engine and coal-fired Scotch-type fire tube boilers. The first of these vessels, the Ocean Vanguard, was launched at the Todd-California yard on October 15, 1941.

== The early years ==
With the defense of both the U.S. and its overseas possessions, along with a very strong national interest in assisting Britain in its struggle to keep its supply lines open to both North America and its overseas colonies, President Franklin D. Roosevelt announced what was to become known as the Emergency Shipbuilding Program on January 3, 1941, for the construction of 200 ships very much similar to those being built for the British. He designated that the program be implemented and administered by the Maritime Commission, which since 1937 had been the federal government department tasked with merchant marine development, and which had worked very closely with the British Mission in placing its 60-ship order. Immediately, the Commission authorized that the two yards building for the British build ships for the U.S. upon completion of their current contracts.

The Maritime Commission also funded the yards to add building ways and realizing that more than two yards would be needed for the program they were expecting to enter into contracts to build new shipyards on the Atlantic, Gulf, and Pacific Coasts of the U.S. In this first wave of expansion, seven additional yards were added to those in Maine and California, and like those yards were to be for the sole purpose of building only the emergency type of ships. While all the yards were to be built by private contractors and operated by commercial shipbuilding companies, the new yards were financed by the Maritime Commission with funds authorized by Congress, thus were owned by the federal government. One of the new yards planned for construction was to be in Baltimore, Maryland, and would be run by the Bethlehem Shipbuilding Corporation. That facility became known as the Bethlehem Fairfield Shipyard for the Fairfield section of Baltimore, where it was located. Bethlehem Shipbuilding was one of the nation's largest shipbuilding companies, having construction yards on the East Coast in Quincy, Massachusetts, on Staten Island, New York, and at Sparrows Point, also in Baltimore.

On the West Coast, it had yards in San Pedro and San Francisco. Another was to be in Wilmington, North Carolina, and managed by the Newport News Shipbuilding and Drydock Company of Newport News, Virginia, which had one of the largest commercial yards in the U.S., and by 1941 was exclusively building large combatant ships for the Navy. That yard was to be called the North Carolina Shipbuilding Company.

Additionally, yards were authorized to be built on the Gulf Coast at Mobile, Alabama, which was to be operated by the Mobile-based Alabama Drydock and Shipbuilding Company, in New Orleans on the Industrial Canal to be known as the Delta Shipbuilding Company and operated by the American Shipbuilding Company of Toledo, Ohio, one at Houston, Texas on the Houston Ship Channel to be operated by Todd Shipyards and called the Todd-Houston Shipbuilding Corp. On the West Coast, one yard was contracted to be built in Los Angeles at Terminal Island and managed by the Bechtel/McCone Company. That yard would be called the California Shipbuilding Corporation or CalShip for short. The Kaiser Corporation itself received a contract to build a new yard on the Columbia River at Portland, Oregon, which would be known as the Oregon Shipbuilding Corp.

See also: Type C1 ship#C1-B-early-years for details on the first C1-B contracts awarded in 1939

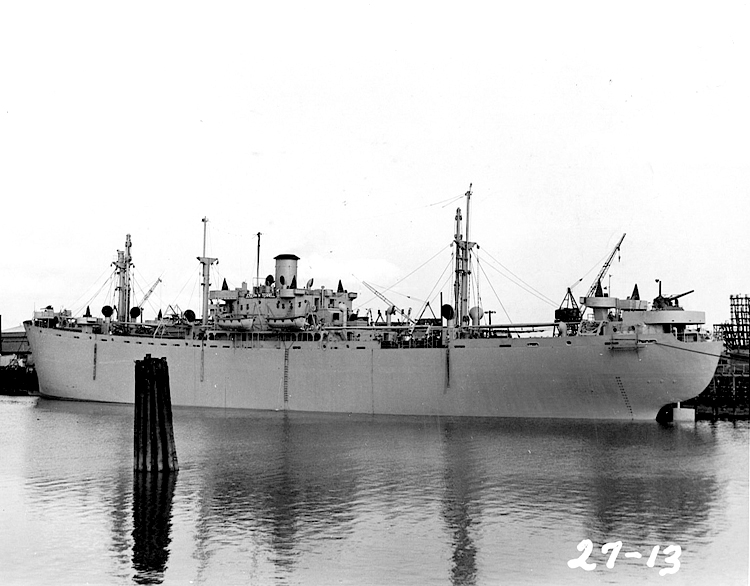
Liberty ship Joseph M. Terrel at Brunswick, GA c. 1944

== The program grows as war nears ==
As 1941 progressed, the construction of the emergency yards accelerated rapidly and keels were laid upon the new building ways. Well before the first wave of expansion was underway or the original 60 British ships were delivered, shortly after the Lend-Lease Bill was passed by Congress in March, a second wave of 306 additional ships was ordered, including 112 of the emergency type; the remainder was standard-type vessels and tankers. This additional number of ships required additional building ways, so the Maritime Commission authorized new ways to be added to the yards in both the Long Range and Emergency Programs and also contracted for a second yard to be built for the Kaiser-managed yards in Richmond, California. After this time, the original Kaiser yard became known as Richmond #1 and the new yard as Richmond #2.

After the May 27 Declaration of Unlimited National Emergency by the President, the Emergency Program was further expanded in a third wave. To accommodate the addition of more ships to be built, additional ways were added to the yards in the program and the schedule of construction accelerated to build more ships per shipway per year. In total, this increase raised the planned output of all merchant shipbuilders to about 500 ships (5 million total deadweight tons) for 1942 and 700 ships (7 million tons) in 1943.

== Impacts of the program on war production and society ==
=== Material shortages ===
While this rapid expansion was taking place, all other defense industries were also in a maximum production mode to accommodate the orders being placed by the government for all other manner of military equipment, which included the massive wartime naval expansion program begun in 1940 with the passage of the Two Ocean Navy Act. So much growth in demand happening simultaneously in industries sharing common materials inevitably led to shortages in steel, propulsion machinery, and most other ship equipment. In many cases, the shortages affected the emergency program more than it did the Navy's, since its programs were deemed of higher priority in the eyes of the many wartime boards set up for deciding on where scarce resources would be allocated. All along the way, the Navy made claim to as much of the raw materials, steel, machinery, manufacturing plant allocations, and labor that it could get.

=== Manpower shortages ===
Another effect of the breakneck growth in production in the early years of the war was a labor shortage in the towns and cities where the emergency shipyards were being built. Since a de facto drought in shipbuilding work had occurred in the U.S. for nearly two decades, the number of experienced shipbuilders was quite small at the war's start. Additionally, many of those towns and cities where new yards were to be built had not been major shipbuilding centers before 1941, and these yards felt the shortage the most. To overcome this shortage, an aggressive recruiting program was undertaken by both the commission and the companies operating the shipyards. Since many of the emergency yards were being managed by established shipbuilding or repair companies, they could send some of their more skilled men to get "the new facilities on their feet and running".

However, a labor force with abilities to accomplish heavy industrial and mechanical work was most needed. To find this labor, recruiting was directed towards areas of the nation's hinterland, which had only a few years before found itself in the depths of the Great Depression in the not mistaken belief that men used to keeping farm machinery operating could build ships, as well. Getting these former farmers to decide to take up shipbuilding was not too difficult an undertaking because the wages offered to these previously poor men were much higher than had ever been offered to such working-class Americans before. This opportunity to earn a good wage showed the way to a possible future, where life might provide better security than in the poverty years of the 1930s, and that was all that was needed to get people on the move. Not uncommonly, entire families made the pilgrimage from places such as the Dust Bowl regions of Texas and Oklahoma to the shipbuilding centers on the West Coast or the Gulf of Mexico. With such a rapid influx of new workers to these communities, however, acute shortages in housing, schools and other needed services arose. Along with building new shipyards and ships, a need existed to build all the necessities for many workers to live in most of the largest shipbuilding centers such as Richmond, and Portland. Workers with just about any skilled trade had steady employment in those communities throughout the course of the war. Some skilled workers such as engineers were "frozen" in their jobs and were not allowed to leave their work, even to enlist.

=== Women and minorities enter the shipbuilding workforce ===
Before the war, shipbuilding had been exclusively a male occupation, but the need to reach out to new sources of labor for the emergency yards created opportunities for women to gain employment in the many trades that are needed to construct a ship. While not as much riveting as welding was used in the building of the emergency ships, the popular symbolic figure of Rosie the Riveter partly sprang from the wartime shipyard, where a new cadre of female shipfitters suddenly developed. Additionally, in the deep South, where African Americans had been excluded from the higher-paying industrial and manufacturing employment, such a shortage of labor existed for the yards on the Gulf that reluctant employers had to accept that black labor was required to meet production goals. In the end, the record productivity for black labor in the Gulf shipyards was no lower than for any other group employed.

== Program summary ==
=== Shipyards in the program ===
By the end of World War II, the list of shipyards building for the Maritime Commission comprised these yards (those in italics did not exist prior to the Emergency Program's start in 1940): For Seattle-Tacoma the Maritime Commission contracts prompted a reopening of a yard that had been dormant for 15 years. Bethlehem Staten Island and Bethlehem San Francisco only produced 5 C1-B each for the Maritime Commission through contracts awarded on a bidding basis in 1939 and following the passing of the Two-Ocean Navy Act of July 1940 switched to producing warships for the Navy. Bath Iron Works produced 4 C-2 before the war in a similar manner.

Yards on the East Coast
Yard name	Location	First delivery	Types delivered	Total number of ways	Total vessels
Sun Shipbuilding and Drydock Co.	Chester, Pennsylvania	1938	C2 type, C4 type, T2 type, T3 type	probably 24	276 ships for Maritime Commission (MC) (plus 78 private account ships)
Bethlehem Sparrows Point	Sparrows Point, Maryland	1939	C1 type, C2 type, C3 type, C5 type, R1 type, T2 type, T3 type	number	77 ships for MC (plus 38 for private acct.)
Federal Shipbuilding	Kearny, New Jersey	1939	C1 type, C2 type, C3 type, P2 type, T3 type	number	84 ships for MC (plus 92 for USN or private account ships)
Newport News Shipbuilding	Newport News, Virginia	1940	C2 type, C3 type, P4 type, T3 type	number	18 ships for MC (remainder for USN)
Bethlehem Staten Island	Staten Island, New York	January 1941	C1 type	number	5 ships for MC (remainder for USN)
Bath Iron Works	Bath, Maine	August 1941	C2 type	number	4 ships for MC (remainder for USN)
Bethlehem Fairfield	Baltimore, Maryland	December 1941	EC2 type, S2 (LST) type, VC2 type	16 ways	514 ships for MC
Pusey and Jones	Wilmington, Delaware	January 1942	C1 type	3 ways	19 ships for MC
North Carolina Shipbuilding	Wilmington, North Carolina	February 1942	EC2 type, C2 type	9 ways	243 ships for USMC
Todd-Bath Shipbuilding	South Portland, Maine	March 1942	British Ocean type, EC2 type	13 ways	30 ships for UK, 242 ships for USMC
Walsh-Kaiser Company, Inc.	Providence, Rhode Island	February 1943	EC2 type, S2 (frigate) type, S4 (transport) type	6 ways	64 ships for MC
Southeastern Shipbuilding	Savannah, Georgia	March 1943	EC2 type, C1-M type	6 ways	105 ships for MC
St. Johns River Shipbuilding Company	Jacksonville, Florida	April 1943	EC2 type, T1 type	6 ways	94 ships for MC
J.A. Jones Construction	Brunswick, Georgia	May 1943	EC2 type, C1-M type	6 ways	99 ships for MC
Penn-Jersey Shipbuilding Corp.	Camden, New Jersey	August 1943	N3 type	number	14 ships for MC
Welding Shipyards	Norfolk, Virginia	November 1943	T3 type	1 way	10 ships for USMC (remainder for private account ships)

There were 4 regional concentrations of shipbuilding on the west coast: San Francisco, Los Angeles, Portland/Vancouver and Puget Sound. All the yards in this table were in one of those regions.

Yards on the West Coast
Yard name	Location	First delivery date	Types delivered	Total number of ways	Total vessels built
Moore Dry Dock Company	Oakland, California	July 1940	C2 type, R2 type, C3 type	4 ways	112 ships
Bethlehem Steel Corp.	San Francisco, California	February 1941	C1-B	number	5 ships for MC (remainder for USN)
Seattle-Tacoma Shipbuilding	Tacoma, Washington	April 1941	C1-B, C3, T1 MC: cargo RN: escort carriers USN: escort carriers, troop transports, gasoline tankers, seaplane and destroyer tenders	8 ways	5 ships for MC, 44 for US Navy, 26 for Royal Navy
Western Pipe & Steel	South San Francisco, California	April 1941	C1 type, C3 type	4 ways	23 ships for MC
Kaiser Richmond No. 1 Yard	Richmond, California	August 1941	British Ocean type, EC2 type, VC2 type	7 ways	30 ships for UK, 191 ships for MC
Kaiser Richmond No. 2 Yard	Richmond, California	September 1941	EC2 type, VC2 type	12 ways	442 ships for MC
Consolidated Steel Long Beach	Long Beach, California	September 1941	C1-B, P1		9
Oregon Shipbuilding	Portland, Oregon	January 1942	EC2 type, VC2 type	11 ways	474 ship
California Shipbuilding	Terminal Island, Los Angeles, California	February 1942	EC2 type, VC2 type	14 ways	443 ships for MC
Kaiser Vancouver Shipyard	Vancouver, Washington	July 1942	EC2 type, S2 (LST) type, S4 (escort carrier) type, VC2 type and C4 type	12 ways	143 ships
MarinShip	Sausalito, California	October 1942	EC2 type, T2 type	6 ways	93 ships for MC
Pacific Bridge Company	Alameda, California	December 1942	N3 type	2 ways (basins)	9 ships for MC (remainder for USN)
Kaiser Swan Island Shipyard	Swan Island, Portland, Oregon	December 1942	T2 type	8 ways	147 ships for MC
Consolidated Steel WIlmington	Wilmington, California	December 1942	C1-B, C1-M, C2, S2 (frigate), S4 (transport)	8 ways	N ships
Kaiser Richmond No. 4 Yard	Richmond, California	April 1943	S2 (LST) type, S2 (frigate) type, C1-M type	3 ways	51 ships
Kaiser Richmond No. 3 Yard	Richmond, California	August 1943	C4 type	5 ways (basins)	35 ships for MC
Bethlehem Alameda Works	Alameda, California	August 1944	P2 type	4 ways	10 ships for MC

Major regional concentrations were in or near Houston and at the port of Mobile, Alabama.

Yards on the Gulf Coast
Yard name	Location	First delivery date	Types delivered	Total number of ways	Total vessels built
Ingalls Shipbuilding	Pascagoula, Mississippi	1940	C3 type	6 ways	80 ships for MC or private (Barges in Decatur AL plant)
Tampa Shipbuilding	Tampa, Florida	July 1940	C2 type	3 ways	13 ships for MC (37 more for USN)
Gulf Shipbuilding	Chickasaw, Alabama	April 1941	C2 type	probably 4	36 ships for MC (35 for USN, 2 for RN)
Pennsylvania Shipyards	Beaumont, Texas	May 1941	C1 type, C1-M type, N3 type, V4 type	5 way	99 ships for MC
Todd Houston Shipbuilding	Houston, Texas	May 1942	EC2 type, T1 type	9 ways	222 ships for MC
Delta Shipbuilding	New Orleans, Louisiana	May 1942	EC2 type	8 ways	188 ships for MC
Alabama Drydock Co.	Mobile, Alabama	May 1942	EC2 type, T2 type	12 ways	123 ships for MC (remainder for private)
Avondale Marine Ways	Westwego, Louisiana	January 1943	N3 type, V4 type	number	22 ships (remainder for private)
J.A. Jones Construction Co.	Panama City, Florida	March 1943	EC2 type, T1 type	6 ways	108 ships for MC
Pendleton Shipyard Company	New Orleans, Louisiana	August 1943	N3 type, V4 type	number	13 ships for MC
Todd Galveston Drydocks Co.	Galveston, Texas	September 1943	T1 type	number	13 ships

Yards on the Great Lakes
Yard name	Location	First delivery date	Types delivered	Total number of ways	Total vessels built
Cargill Inc.	Savage, Minnesota	November 1941	T1 type	number	18 for US Navy
Leatham D. Smith Shipbuilding Co.	Sturgeon Bay, Wisconsin	November 1942	C1-M type, N3 type, S2 (frigate) type	number	34 ships for MC (remainder to USN or other govt.)
Walter Butler Shipbuilders Inc.	Superior, Wisconsin	December 1942	C1-M type, N3 type, S2 (frigate) type	number	52 ships for MC
Froemming Brothers	Milwaukee, Wisconsin	April 1943	C1-M type, V4 type, S2 (frigate) type	number	26 ships for MC
American Shipbuilding	Lorain, Ohio	May 1943	L6 type, S2 (frigate) type	number	14 ships for MC (remainder 35 for USN or private)
Walter Butler Shipbuilders	Duluth, Minnesota	May 1943	C1-M type, N3 type, T1 type	number	38 ships for MC (remainder to private)
Globe Shipbuilding	Superior, Wisconsin	May 1943	C1-M type, V4 type, S2 (frigate) type	number	29 ships for MC
Great Lakes Engineering Co.	Ecorse, Michigan	May 1943	L6 type	number	6 ships for MC (remainder for private)
Great Lakes Engineering Works	Ashtabula, Ohio	May 1943	L6 type	number	4 ships (remainder for private)
American Shipbuilding	Cleveland, Ohio	June 1943	L6 type, S2 (frigate) type	number	9 ships for MC (16 for USN)
Missouri Valley Bridge & Iron Co.	Evansville, Indiana & Leavenworth, Kansas	September 1942	LST, LCT, crane ships, barges	number	171 LST, 64 LCTs, 3 crane ship

=== Ships built by type ===
Type of ship (incl. all variant designs w/in type)	Deliveries 1940	Deliveries 1941	Deliveries 1942	Deliveries 1943	Deliveries 1944	Deliveries 1945	Totals for all years
C1 type cargo ship	1	29	20	78	64	2	194
C1-M type cargo ship	0	0	0	0	64	189	220
C2 type cargo ship	6	17	20	54	109	82	309
EC2 type (1) cargo ship	0	7	55	1279	728	144	2755
VC2 type cargo ship	0	0	0	0	208	322	530
C3 type cargo ship	26	14	25	65	44	36	315
C4 type cargo ship	0	0	0	5	26	34	65
T1 type tanker	0	0	0	25	37	46	108
T2 type tanker	0	2	31	139	218	139	529
T3 type tanker	4	1	2	21	14	10	59
P2 type troop transport	0	0	0	0	3	16	19
S2 type frigate	0	0	0	18	59	8	85
S3 type landing ship	0	0	12	64	0	0	76
S4 type escort carrier	0	0	0	19	31	0	50
S4 type attack transport	0	0	0	0	29	35	64
L6 type Great Lakes ore carriers	0	0	0	16	0	0	16
N3 type cargo ship	0	0	0	46	51	6	107
V4 type tug	0	0	0	48	14	0	62

(1) includes 60 British type
