= United States Maritime Commission =

US federal agency (1936–1950)

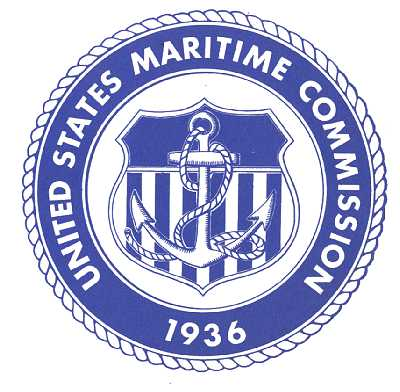
Seal of the United States Maritime Commission

The United States Maritime Commission was an independent executive agency of the U.S. federal government that was created by the Merchant Marine Act of 1936, which was passed by Congress on June 29, 1936, and was abolished on May 24, 1950. The commission replaced the United States Shipping Board which had existed since World War I. It was intended to formulate a merchant shipbuilding program to design and build five hundred modern merchant cargo ships to replace the World War I vintage vessels that comprised the bulk of the United States Merchant Marine, and to administer a subsidy system authorized by the Act to offset the cost differential between building in the U.S. and operating ships under the American flag. It also formed the United States Maritime Service for the training of seagoing ship's officers to man the new fleet.

As a symbol of the rebirth of the U.S. Merchant Marine and Merchant Shipbuilding under the Merchant Marine Act, the first vessel contracted for was SS America. Owned by United States Lines, she briefly operated in the passenger liner and cruise service before being converted into a high-speed transport, per her design.

The headquarters was in the Commerce Building.

From 1939 through the end of World War II, the Maritime Commission funded and administered the largest and most successful merchant shipbuilding effort in world history. By the end of the war, U.S. shipyards working under Maritime Commission contracts had built a total of 5,777 oceangoing merchant and naval ships and many smaller vessels.

A huge postwar contraction followed, with massive sell-offs to foreign militaries and commercial fleets. The last major shipbuilding project undertaken by the Commission was to oversee the design and construction of the super passenger liner SS United States which was intended to be both a symbol of American technological might and maritime predominance but also could be quickly converted into the world's fastest naval troop transport.

The Maritime Commission was abolished on May 24, 1950, and its functions were divided between the U.S. Federal Maritime Commission which was responsible for regulating shipping trades and trade routes and the United States Maritime Administration, which was responsible for administering the construction and operating subsidy programs, maintaining NDRF, and operating the U.S. Merchant Marine Academy which had been built and opened during World War II and which continues to be funded as the nation's federally operated maritime academy under 46 USC 310.

== History ==
=== Purposes ===
The purpose of the Maritime Commission was multifold as described in the Merchant Marine Act's Declaration of Policy. The first role was to formulate a merchant shipbuilding program to design and then have built over a ten-year period 500 modern fast merchant cargo ships which would replace the World War I-vintage vessels which made up the bulk of the U.S. Merchant Marine prior to the Act. Those ships were intended to be chartered (leased) to U.S. shipping companies for their use in the foreign seagoing trades for whom they would be able to offer better and more economical freight services to their clients. The ships were also intended to serve as a reserve naval auxiliary force in the event of armed conflict which was a duty the U.S. merchant fleet had often filled throughout the years since the Revolutionary War. The second role given to the Maritime Commission was to administer a subsidy system authorized by the Act which would offset the differential cost between both building in the U.S. and operating ships under the American flag. Another function given to the Commission involved the formation of the U.S. Maritime Service for the training of seagoing ship's officers to man the new fleet. The actual licensing of officers and seamen still resided with the Bureau of Marine Inspection and Navigation.

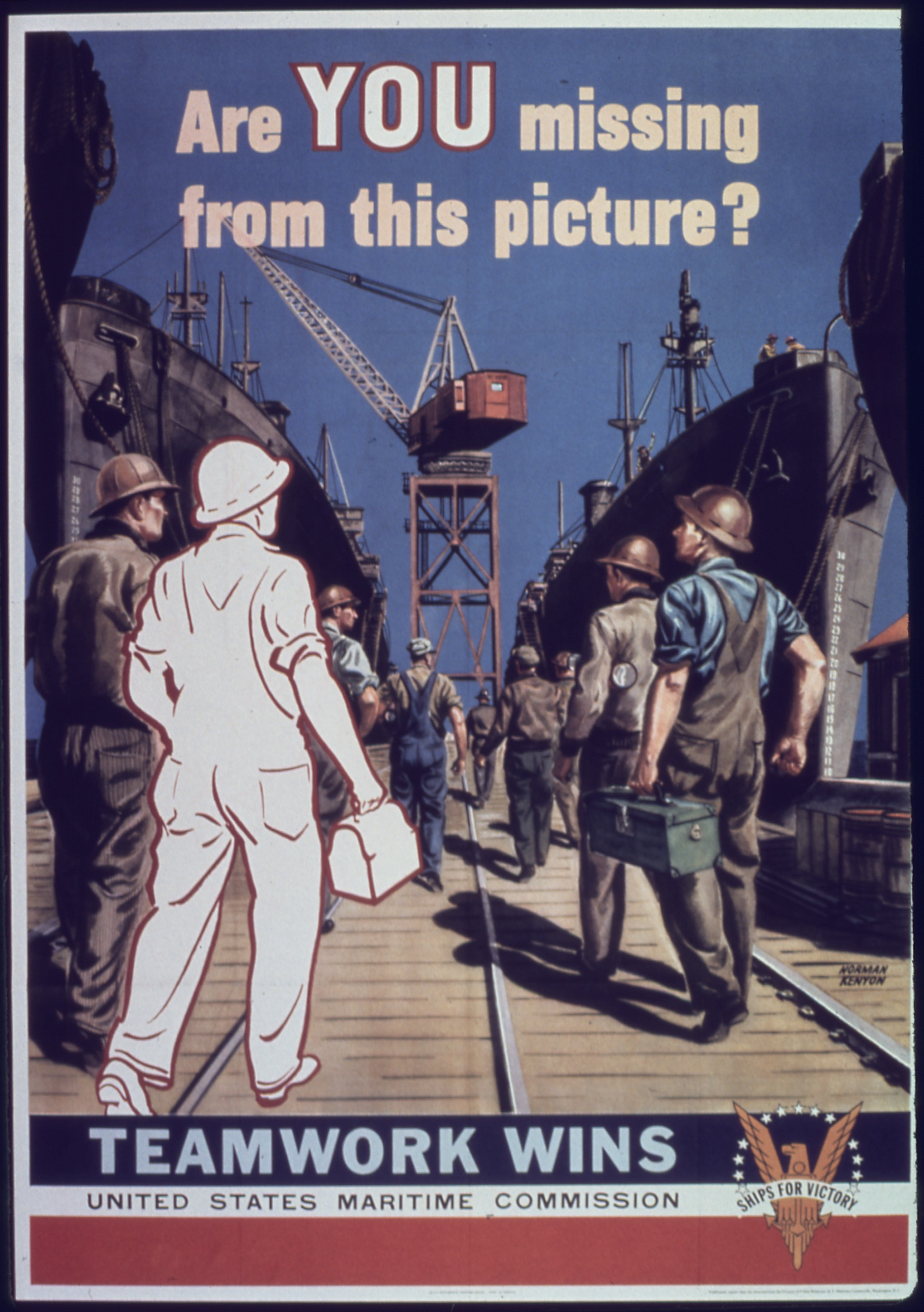
WWII United States Maritime Commission poster

=== Pre-World War II ===
President Roosevelt nominated Joseph P. Kennedy (1937-1938) first director of the Commission. Kennedy held that position until February 1938 when he left to become US Ambassador to Great Britain. After Kennedy's departure, the chairmanship was assumed by Rear Admiral Emory S. Land, USN (ret.) (1938-1946), who had been the head of U.S. Navy's Bureau of Construction and Repair prior to his appointment to the Commission on the behest of the President and where he had been a deputy commissioner since the founding of the body. The other four members of the Commission in the years before the beginning of World War II were a mix of retired naval officers and men from disciplines of law and business. The man most notable in the group Land brought to the Commission was Commander Howard L. Vickery, USN, who, like Land, was a naval officer closely involved in the construction of new Navy vessels. Vickery became responsible for overseeing the Commission's shipbuilding functions including the design and construction of the ships, developing shipyards to build them and companies to manufacture the complicated and highly specialized ship's machinery. As World War II drew closer, Vickery was very much at the forefront of putting into place the Emergency Shipbuilding Program which men like Henry J. Kaiser were so instrumental in developing into an industry which would perform some of the greatest feats of wartime industrial production ever previously witnessed and never since matched.

As a symbol of the rebirth of the U.S. Merchant Marine and Merchant Shipbuilding under the Merchant Marine Act, the first vessel contracted for was SS America, which was owned by the United States Line and operated in the passenger liner and cruise service during 1940-1. Upon the U.S. entry into World War II, America was requisitioned by the U.S. Navy and became USS West Point. In the prewar years, several dozen other merchant ships were built for the Commission under its original 500 ship Long Range Shipbuilding Program but it was not until the late fall of 1940 the critical importance of the Commission to the defense of the lifeline to Great Britain and to the national mobilization for war became apparent when the beginnings of the Emergency Shipbuilding program were laid. Together, all the Maritime Commission's shipbuilding program became known as Ships for Victory and great pride was taken in it by the many thousands of ordinary citizens went to work in the shipyards and joined the ranks of the shipbuilding workforce.

=== World War II ===
From 1939 through the end of World War II, the Maritime Commission funded and administered the largest and most successful merchant shipbuilding effort in world history, producing thousands of ships and other vessels, including Liberty ships, Victory ships, and others, notably Type B barges; Type C1, Type C2, Type C3, and Type C4 freighters; Type R refrigerator ships; T1, T2, and T3 tankers, and Type V tugs. Most of the C2s and C3s were converted to Navy auxiliaries, notably attack cargo ships, attack transports, and escort aircraft carriers and many of the tankers became fleet replenishment oilers. The Commission also was tasked with the construction of many hundred "military type" vessels such as Landing Ship, Tank (LST)s and Tacoma-class frigates (PF)s and large troop transports for the Navy and Army Transportation Corps. By the end of the war, U.S. shipyards working under Maritime Commission contracts had built a total of 5,777 oceangoing merchant and naval ships.

In early 1942 both the training and licensing was transferred to the U.S. Coast Guard for administration, but then late in the fall of 1942, the Maritime Service was transferred to the newly created War Shipping Administration which itself was created for the purpose of overseeing the operation of the fleet of merchant ships being built by the Emergency Program for the needs of the U.S. Armed Services. The WSA was added to the list of wartime agencies created within the Roosevelt Administration and was intended to relieve the already full plate of responsibilities of the Commission, yet they shared the same Chairman in Admiral Land and so worked very closely together.

=== Post World War II ===
With the end of World War II, both the Emergency and Long Range shipbuilding programs were terminated as there were far too many merchant vessels now for the Nation's peacetime needs. In 1946, the Commission was chaired by Vice admiral William W. Smith (1946-1950) and the Merchant Ship Sales Act was passed to sell off a large portion of the ships previously built during the war to commercial buyers, both domestic and foreign. This facilitated the rebuilding of the fleets of both allied nations such as Great Britain, Norway and Greece which had lost a majority of their prewar vessels to the Battles of the Atlantic and Mediterranean Sea. Although not sold outright to nations that were enemies during the war, U.S. merchant ships helped nations such as Japan, which had lost many hundreds of its merchant vessels to the Allies' submarine offensive in the western Pacific, recover their merchant shipping capacity via the loan of vessels and the carrying of relief cargoes to war ravaged Europe. Ships were also used in both the rebuilding programs under the Marshall Plan and the transport of food aid sent during the desperate winter of 1945-46 when famine loomed large over much of the European continent. For the next 25 years, in ports all around the world one could find dozens of ships which had been built during the war but which now were used in peace. Many of those same ships continued to sail until the early 1980s but most had been sold for scrap in the 1960s and 1970s as more modern designs were developed and more efficient slow speed diesel engines introduced to replace the steamships which predominated those built by the Commission during the war years.

Ships not disposed of through the Ship Sales Act were placed into one of eight National Defense Reserve Fleet(NDRF) sites maintained on the Atlantic, Pacific and Gulf coasts. On several occasions in the postwar years ships in the reserve fleets were activated for both military and humanitarian aid missions. The last major mobilization of the NDRF came during the Vietnam War. Since then, a smaller fleet of ships called the Ready Reserve Force has been mobilized to support both humanitarian and military missions.

==== SS United States ====
The last major shipbuilding project undertaken by the Commission was to oversee the design and construction of the super passenger liner SS United States, which was intended to be both a symbol of American technological might and maritime predominance but also could be quickly converted into the world's fastest naval troop transport.

=== Abolition ===
The Maritime Commission was abolished on 24 May 1950, and its functions were divided between the U.S. Federal Maritime Commission which was responsible for regulating shipping trades and trade routes and the United States Maritime Administration, which was responsible for administering the construction and operating subsidy programs, maintaining NDRF, and operating the U.S. Merchant Marine Academy which had been built and opened during World War II and which continues to be funded and operated today as one of the five Federal Service Academies.

== Timeline ==
- 1936: Merchant Marine Act abolishes Shipping Board and establishes Maritime Commission.
- 1937: Joseph P. Kennedy appointed by President Roosevelt as the first head of the Maritime Commission
- 1938: Maritime Commission authorizes large merchant fleet
- 1940: Maritime Commission agrees to build 60 Ocean class merchant ships for the British Ministry of War Transportation.
- 1941 Beginning of the Emergency Shipbuilding Program
- 1942: The War Shipping Administration was established
- 1942: The United States Coast Guard takes over Bureau of Marine Inspection and Navigation
- 1942: United States Merchant Marine Academy opens at Kings Point, Long Island, New York
- 1942: Maine Merchant Marine Academy, later named Maine Maritime Academy, opens in Castine, Maine
- 1950: Functions of Maritime Commission transferred to Department of Commerce and MARAD, United States Maritime Administration

== Directors ==
- Joseph P. Kennedy (1937-1938)
- Rear Admiral Emory S. Land, USN (1938-1946)
- Vice Admiral William W. Smith, USN (1946-1950)

== See also ==
Responsibility for U.S. merchant shipping has been held by many agencies since 1917. For a history, see:

- United States Shipping Board
- United States Merchant Marine
- U.S. Merchant Marine Academy
- War Shipping Administration
- United States Maritime Administration
- World War II United States Merchant Navy
