= List of Victory ships (D) =

This is a list of Victory ships with names beginning with D.

== Description ==
A Victory ship was a cargo ship. The cargo ships were 455 feet 3 inches (138.76 m) overall, 436 feet 6 inches (133.05 m) between perpendiculars They had a beam of 62 feet 0 inches (18.90 m), a depth of 38 feet 0 inches (11.58 m) and a draught of 28 feet 0 inches (8.53 m). They were assessed at 7,612 GRT, 4,555 NRT and 10,750 DWT.

The ships were powered by a triple expansion steam engine, driving a steam turbine via double reduction gear. This gave the ship a speed of 15.5 knots (28.7 km/h) or 16.5 knots (30.6 km/h), depending on the machinery installed.

Liberty ships had five holds. No. 1 hold was 57 feet 6 inches (17.53 m) long, with a capacity of 81,715 cubic feet (2,313.9 m^{3}), No. 2 hold was 45 feet 0 inches (13.72 m) long, with a capacity of 89,370 cubic feet (2,531 m^{3}), No. 3 hold was 78 feet 0 inches (23.77 m) long, with a capacity of 158,000 cubic feet (4,500 m^{3}), No. 4 hold was 81 feet 0 inches (24.69 m) long, with a capacity of 89,370 cubic feet (2,531 m^{3}) and No. 5 hold was 75 feet 0 inches (22.86 m) long, with a capacity of 81,575 cubic feet (2,309.9 m^{3}).

In wartime service, they carried a crew of 62, plus 28 gunners. The ships carried four lifeboats. Two were powered, with a capacity of 27 people and two were unpowered, with a capacity of 29 people.

== Dalton Victory ==
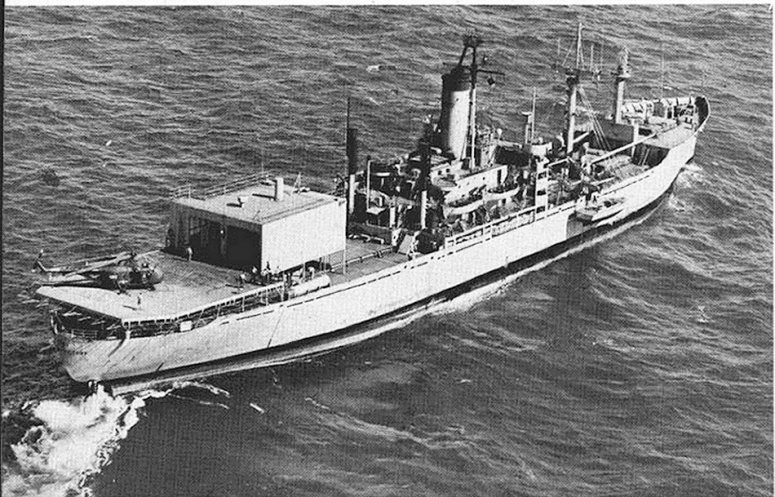
USNS Dalton Victory

Dalton Victory was built by California Shipbuilding Corporation, Terminal Island, Los Angeles, California. Her keel was laid on 8 April 1944. She was launched on 6 June and delivered on 19 July. Built for the War Shipping Administration (WSA), she was operated under the management of Sudden & Christenson. To the United States Navy in 1950. Operated by the Military Sea Transportation Service. Converted to a missile range ship in July 1950. Renamed Sunnyvale in 1960. She was scrapped at Terminal Island in 1975.

== Dane ==
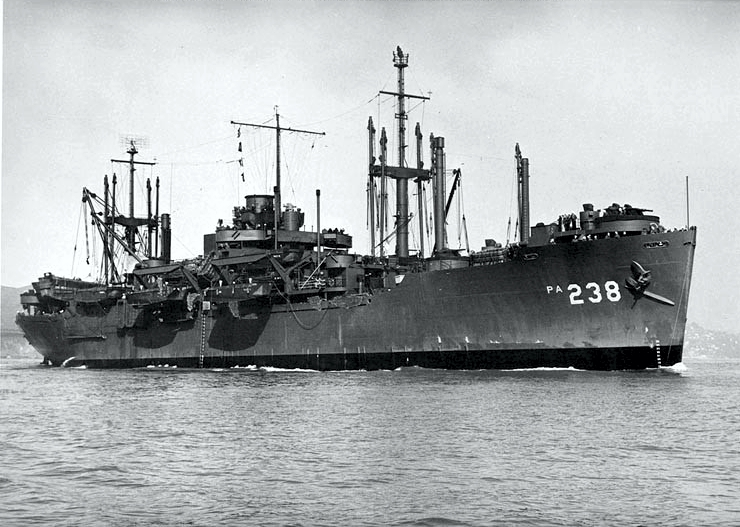
USS Dane

Dane was built by Oregon Shipbuilding Corporation, Portland, Oregon. Her keel was laid on 18 June 1945. She was launched on 9 August and delivered on 29 October. Built for the United States Navy. Decommissioned in 1946. To the United States Maritime Administration in 1959 and laid up in Suisun Bay. She was scrapped in the United States in 1975.

== Darke ==
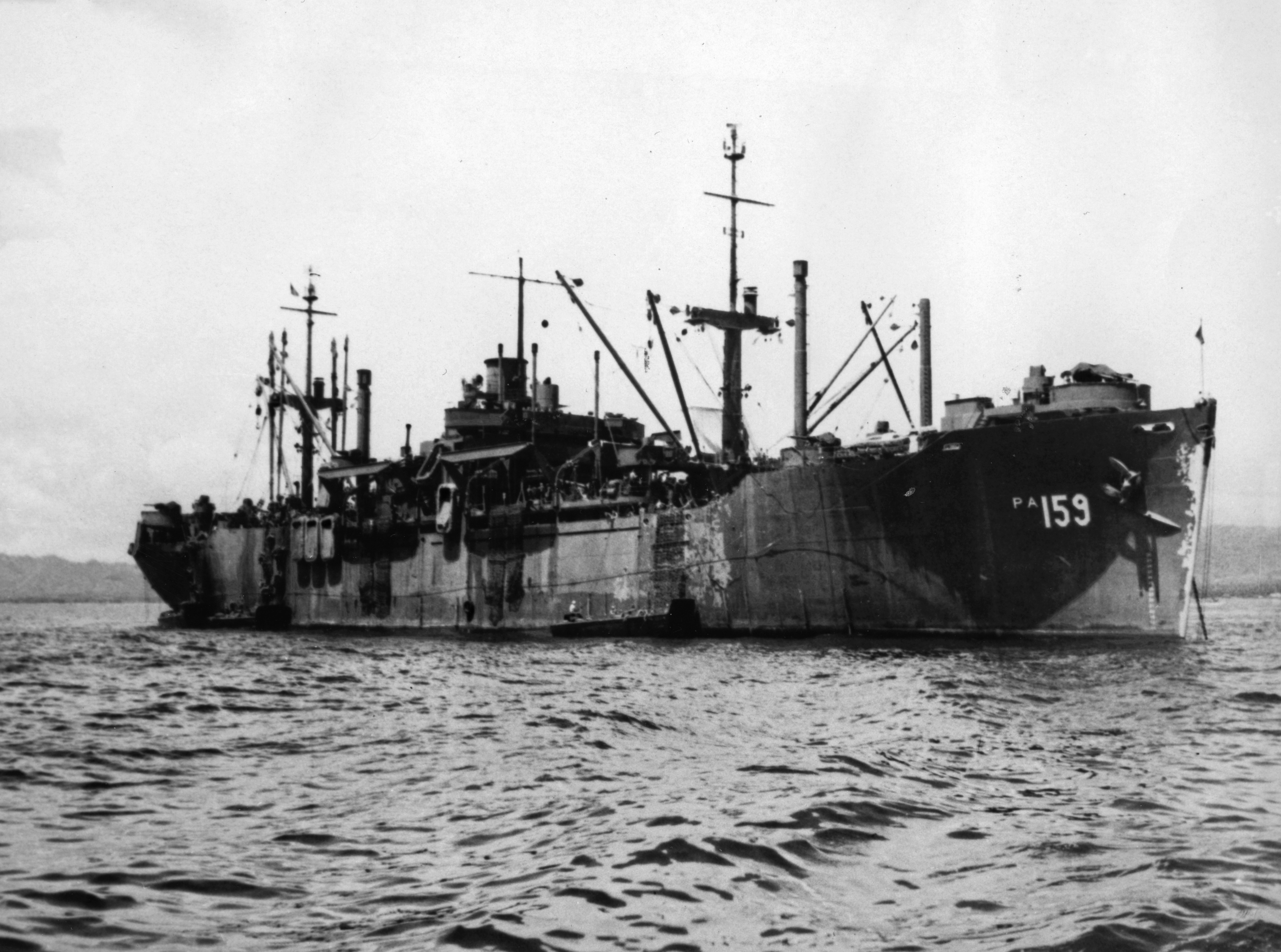
USS Darke

Darke was built by Oregon Shipbuilding Corporation. Her keel was laid on 14 June 1944. She was launched on 29 August and delivered on 10 October. Built for the United States Navy. To the United States Maritime Commission (USMC) in 1946 and laid up in the James River. She was scrapped at Rotterdam, Netherlands in 1974.

== Dartmouth Victory ==
Dartmouth Victory was built by Oregon Shipbuilding Corporation. Her keel was laid on 5 January 1945. She was launched on 15 February and delivered on 17 March. Built for the WSA, she was operated under the management of Alaska Transportation Company. Sold in 1951 to American President Lines, San Francisco, California and renamed President Arthur. To the United States Department of Commerce in 1959 and laid up. Sold in 1960 to American Mail Line, Seattle, Washington and renamed Alaska Mail. To the United States Department of Commerce in 1964, leased back to American Mail Line. Sold in 1965 to Saxis Steamship Co., Wilmington, Delaware and renamed Choctaw Victory. Sold in 1965 to Dyer Steamship Co. She was scrapped at Kaohsiung, Taiwan in August 1968.

== Davidson Victory ==
Davidson Victory

Davidson Victory was built by Oregon Shipbuilding Corporation. Her keel was laid on 16 January 1945. She was launched on 27 February and delivered on 30 March. Built for the WSA, she was operated under the management of Pacific-Atlantic Steamship Company, Tacoma, Washington. Sold to her managers in 1948 and renamed Montana. Sold in 1955 to States Steamship Company, Tacoma. To the United States Maritime Commission (USMC) on 1961. Laid up at Astoria, Oregon. She was scrapped at Portland in August 1968.

== De Pauw Victory ==
De Pauw Victory was built by Permanente Metals Corporation, Richmond, California. Her keel was laid on 22 December 1944. She was launched on 7 February 1945 and delivered on 3 March. Built for the WSA, she was operated under the management of American-Hawaiian Steamship Company. She was laid up in the Hudson River in 1948. Later transferred to Suisun Bay. She was scrapped at Kaohsiung in 1989.

== Denison Victory ==
Denison Victory was built by Permanente Metals Corporation. Her keel was laid on 8 March 1945. She was launched on 11 April and delivered on 19 May. Built for the WSA, she was operated under the management of Interocean Steamship Company. Laid up at Wilmington, North Carolina in 1948. Returned to service in 1966 due to the Vietnam War. Laid up in the James River in 1973. She was scrapped at Kaohsiung in 1988.

== Deuel ==
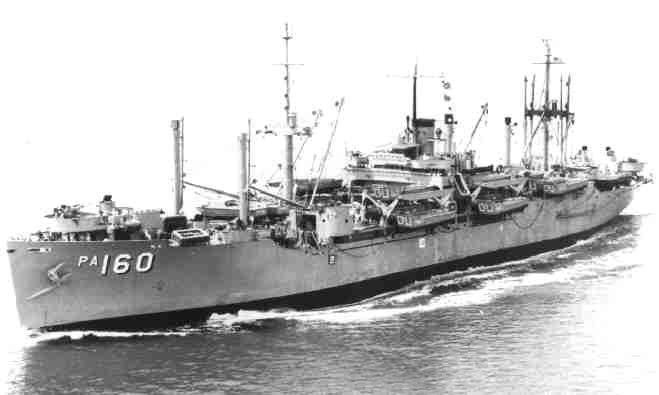
USS Deuel

Deuel was built by Oregon Shipbuilding Corporation. Her keel was laid on 17 June 1944. She was launched on 9 September and delivered on 13 October. Built for the United States Navy. She was decommissioned in 1946, recommissioned in 1950 and decommissioned in 1956. To the United States Maritime Administration in 1960 and laid up in the James River. She was scrapped in the United States in 1974.

== Devils Lake Victory ==
Devils Lake Victory was built by Permanente Metals Corporation. Her keel was laid on 31 October 1944. She was launched on 22 December and delivered on 13 January 1945. Built for the WSA, she was operated under the management of Moore-McCormack Lines. Laid up at Beaumont, Texas in 1948. Sold in 1951 to Bloomfield Steamship Co., Houston, Texas and renamed Alice Brown. Renamed Mary Adams in 1957. Sold later that year to States Steamship Corp., Delaware, New York and renamed Magnolia State. Sold in 1960 to States Marine Lines, New York. She was scrapped at Kaohsiung in June 1970.

== Dickens ==
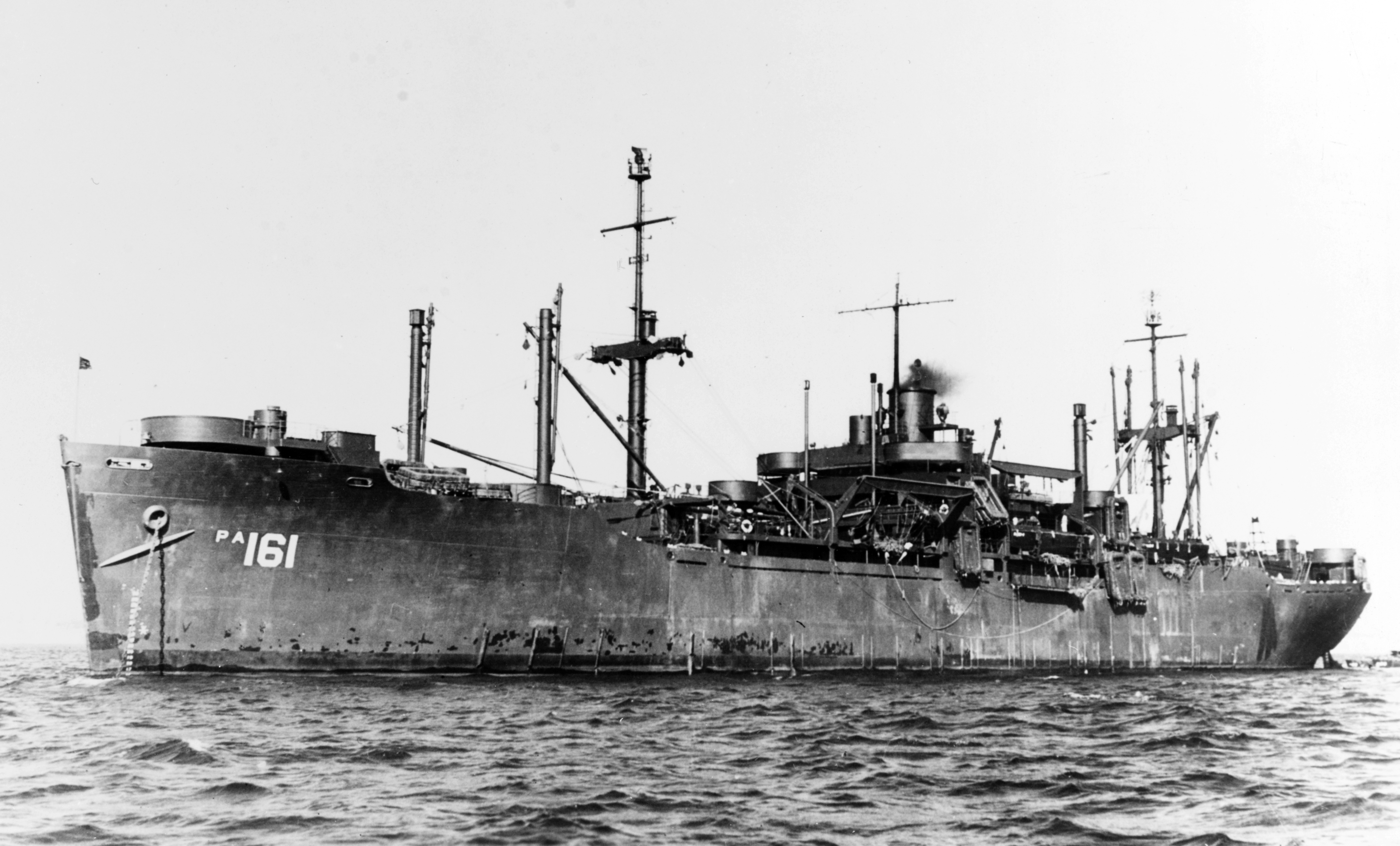
USS Dickens

Dickens was built by Oregon Shipbuilding Corporation. Her keel was laid on 21 June 1944. She was launched on 8 September and delivered on 18 October. Built for the United States Navy. To the USMC in 1946 and laid up in the James River. She was scrapped in the United States in 1974.

== Dickinson Victory ==
Dickinson Victory was built by California Shipbuilding Corporation. Her keel was laid on 15 December 1944. She was launched on 9 February 1945 and delivered on 1 March. Built for the WSA, she was operated under the management of Seas Shipping Co. Laid up at Mobile, Alabama in 1946. Sold in 1951 to Lykes Brothers Steamship Company, New Orleans, Louisiana and renamed Mayo Lykes. To the United States Department of Commerce in 1962 and laid up at Mobile. Loaned to the United States Department of Transportation in 1971 for use as a firefighting training ship. Laid up at Beaumont in 1996, she was scrapped in 1999.

== Dominican Victory ==
Dominican Victory was a troop transport built by Oregon Shipbuilding Corporation. Her keel was laid on 31 January 1944. She was launched on 6 April and delivered on 9 May. Built for the WSA, she was operated under the management of Union Sulphur Company. Laid up in the James River in 1946. Sold in 1947 to India Steamship Co., Calcutta, India and renamed Indian Pioneer. Sold in 1972 to Pent-Ocean Steamships Ltd., Bombay, India and renamed Samudra Raksha. She was scrapped in Bombay in 1977.

== Dothan Victory ==
Dothan Victory was built by Oregon Shipbuilding Corporation. Her keel was laid on 21 June 1945. She was launched on 11 August and delivered on 7 November. Built for the WSA, she was operated under the management of Northland Transportation Co. Sold in 1947 to Moore-McCormack Lines and renamed Mormacfir. She was severely damaged on 20 February 1955 when she collided with a swing bridge at Aalborg, Denmark. Sold in 1970 to Superb Mariners S.A., Panama and renamed Superina. She was scrapped at Kaohsiung in April 1972.

== Douglas Victory ==
Douglas Victory was built by California Shipbuilding Corporation. Her keel was laid on 13 November 1944. She was launched on 9 January 1945 and delivered on 7 February. Built for the WSA, she was operated under the management of James Griffiths & Sons. Laid up at Beaumont in 1948. Sold in 1951 to Lykes Brothers Steamship Company and renamed Leslie Lykes. To the United States Department of Commerce in 1961. Renamed Douglas Victory in 1963 and laid up at Mobile. sold to New York shipbreakers in May 1972, she was scrapped at Panama City, Florida in 1975.

== Drake Victory ==
Drake Victory was built by Permanente Metals Corporation. Her keel was laid on 12 April 1945. She was launched on 23 May and delivered on 16 June. Built for the WSA, she was operated under the management of Black Diamond Steamship Company. Laid up in the Hudson River in 1948. Later transferred to Beaumont. She was sold for breaking in 1992 and laid up at Port of Spain, Trinidad. She was scrapped at Port of Spain in 1996.

== Drew ==
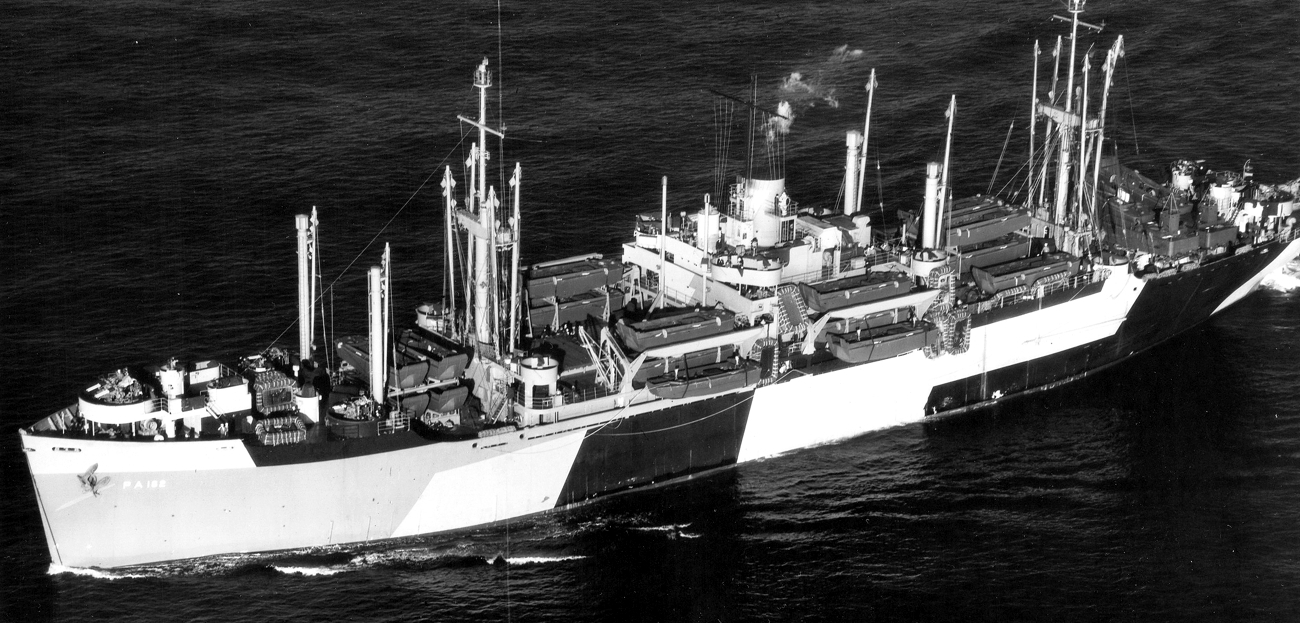
USS Drew

Drew was built by Oregon Shipbuilding Corporation. Her keel was laid on 30 June 1944. She was launched on 14 September and delivered on 22 October. Built for the United States Navy. To the USMC in 1946 and laid up in the James River. She was scrapped at Brownsville, Texas in 1974.

== Drew Victory ==
Drew Victory was built by Oregon Shipbuilding Corporation. Her keel was laid on 30 June 1944. She was launched on 14 September and delivered on 22 October. Built for the WSA, she was operated under the management of Weyerhaeuser Steamship Company. To Pacific-Atlantic Steamship Company in 1949 and renamed California. Sold in 1955 to States Steamship Company. Renamed Utah in 1959. To the United States Department of Commerce in 1961. Laid up at San Francisco. To the United States Navy in 1963, renamed Provo. Operated by the Military Sea Transportation Service. She was scrapped at Kaohsiung in 1973.

== Drexel Victory ==
Drexel Victory was built by Permanente Metals Corporation. Her keel was laid on 25 February 1945. She was launched on 7 April and delivered on 2 May. Built for the WSA, she was operated under the management of Oliver J. Olson. She ran aground on the Peacock Spit, at the mouth of the Columbia River, Oregon on 20 January 1947 whilst on a voyage from Astoria to Yokohama, Japan. She was refloated, but consequently sank 5 nautical miles (9.3 km) off the Cape Disappointment Lighthouse.

== Drury Victory ==
Drury Victory was built by Permanente Metals Corporation. Her keel was laid on 26 April 1945. She was launched on 6 June and delivered on 3 July. Built for the WSA, she was operated under the management of American-West African Line. Laid up at Mobile in 1949. Returned to service in 1950 due to the Korean War. Laid up in the James River in 1953. She was scrapped at Castellón de la Plana, Spain in 1985.

== Duke Victory ==
Duke Victory was built by Permanente Metals Corporation. Her keel was laid on 9 January 1945. She was launched on 21 February and delivered on 17 March. Built for the WSA, she was operated under the management of McCormick Steamship Co. Laid up in the James River in 1947,she was scrapped at Alang, India in 1994..

== Durango Victory ==
Durango Victory was built by Permanente Metals Corporation. Her keel was laid on 17 October 1944. She was launched on 16 December and delivered on 5 January 1945. Built for the WSA, she was operated under the management of American President Lines. Laid up at Wilmington, North Carolina in 1947. Later transferred to the James River. She was scrapped at Brownsville in 1995.

== Durham Victory ==
Durham Victory was built by California Shipbuilding Corporation. Her keel was laid on 30 March 1944. She was launched on 26 May and delivered on 5 July. Built for the WSA, she was operated under the management of Agwilines Inc. Sold in 1946 to Holland-Amerika Lijn, Rotterdam and renamed Averdijk. Renamed Averdyk in 1954. Sold in 1967 to Consolidated Mariner S.A., Panama and renamed Domina. She was scrapped at Kaohsiung in March 1972.
