= USS Antares (AK-258) =

Cargo ship of the United States Navy

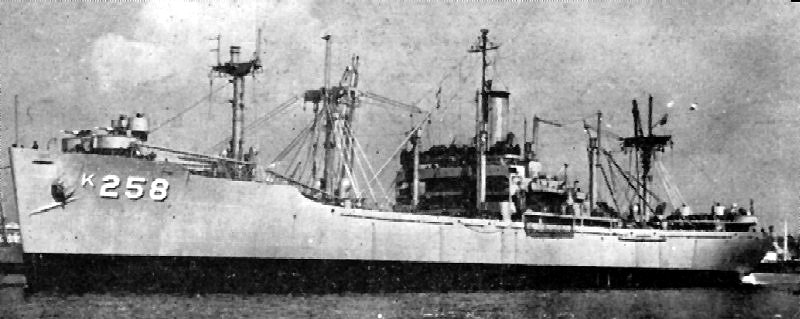
- USS Antares (AK-258) as a cargo ship.

History

United States
- Name: Nampa Victory; Antares
- Namesake: Nampa, Idaho; Antares
- Operator: International Freighting Company during World War II; Pacific-Atlantic Steamship Company 28 November 1945 – 31 October 1946; Waterman Steamship Corporation 31 October 1946 – 13 November 1946; A. L. Burbank and Company 13 November 1946 – 6 December 1947
- Ordered: as type (VC2-S-AP3) hull, MCV hull 107
- Builder: Oregon Shipbuilding Corporation, Portland, Oregon
- Laid down: 6 April 1944, as SS Nampa Victory
- Launched: 19 May 1944
- Sponsored by: Mrs. R. A. Hadley
- Completed: 10 June 1944
- Acquired: 23 July 1951, by the USN
- Commissioned: 12 February 1952, as USS Antares (AK-258)
- Decommissioned: 18 December 1964
- Renamed: 26 July 1951, Antares
- Reclassified: 1 April 1959, Stores Issue Ship (AKS-33)
- Stricken: 1 September 1965
- Identification: Hull symbol:AK-258; Hull symbol:AKS-33
- Honors and awards: Armed Forces Expeditionary Medal
- Fate: Sold for scrapping, 5 April 1974, to Union Minerals and Alloys Corp., for $225,433

General characteristics
- Class & type: Greenville Victory-class cargo ship
- Displacement: 4,512 metric tons (4,441 long tons) (standard); 15,589 metric tons (15,343 long tons) (full load)
- Length: 455 ft (139 m)
- Beam: 62 ft (19 m)
- Draft: 29 ft 2 in (8.89 m)
- Installed power: 8,500 shp (6,300 kW)
- Propulsion: 1 × steam turbine; 2 × boilers; 1 × shaft
- Speed: 16.5 knots (30.6 km/h; 19.0 mph)
- Complement: 250
- Armament: 2 × 40 mm (1.6 in) Bofors guns anti-aircraft gun mounts

The second USS Antares (AK-258) was a United States Navy Greenville Victory-class cargo ship in commission from 1952 to 1959. She was converted into a general stores issue ship (AKS-33) in 1959–1960 and remained in commission as such until 1964. She saw extensive service during the Cold War. Prior to her U.S. Navy career, she had operated as the merchant ship SS Nampa Victory during the latter stages of World War II and in the years immediately after the war.

== Construction ==
SS Nampa Victory was a Maritime Commission type VC2-S-AP3 hull laid down on 6 April 1944 at Portland, Oregon, by the Oregon Shipbuilding Corporation under a Maritime Commission contract as MCV hull 107. She was launched on 19 May 1944, sponsored by Mrs. R. A. Hadley, and was delivered to the Maritime Commission on 10 June 1944.

== Operations as SS Nampa Victory ==
SS Nampa Victory entered mercantile service as a cargo ship, operated during World War II by the International Freighting Company under contract to the War Shipping Administration. SS Nampa Victory serviced in the Pacific War on WW2. SS Nampa Victory delivered supply to troop in Pacific Ocean. SS Nampa Victory was in combat action in the assault-occupation of Okinawa in the Battle of Okinawa.

After the war, she was operated under a general agency agreement successively by the Pacific-Atlantic Steamship Company from 28 November 1945 to 31 October 1946, the Waterman Steamship Corporation from 31 October 1946 to 13 November 1946, and A. L. Burbank and Company from 13 November 1946 to 6 December 1947. On 18 January 1948, she was laid up in the National Defense Reserve Fleet in Wilmington, North Carolina.

On 21 September 1950, United States Lines leased Nampa Victory, and she briefly returned to active service. On 28 November 1950, she again was laid up in the National Defense Reserve Fleet, this time in the James River Reserve Fleet on the James River at Lee Hall, Virginia.

== United States Navy service ==
=== USS Antares (AK-258) ===
The U.S. Navy acquired Nampa Victory on 23 July 1951 and renamed her Antares on 26 July 1951, when she also was classified as a cargo ship (AK) and designated AK-258. After conversion for naval service by the Maryland Drydock Company at Baltimore, Maryland, she was commissioned at Baltimore on 12 February 1952 as USS Antares (AK-258). Her title was transferred to the U.S. Navy on 31 May 1956, by which time she already had been in active Navy service for over four years.

During the first seven years of her U.S. Navy career, Antares operated as a cargo carrier between ports on the United States East Coast, in the West Indies, and along the coast of the Mediterranean Sea. During the autumn of 1958, she earned the Armed Forces Expeditionary Medal for her support for the ships and troops engaged in the U.S. intervention in the 1958 Lebanon crisis.

=== USS Antares (AKS-33) ===
Anticipating her conversion to a general stores issue ship (AKS), Antares was redesignated AKS-33 on 1 April 1959. She entered the Norfolk Naval Shipyard in Portsmouth, Virginia, in June 1959 to receive modifications to allow her to perform underway replenishment of other ships. The work was interrupted in August 1959 in order that she might conduct refresher training in Cuban waters and then make a two-month deployment to the Mediterranean Sea. In November 1959, she resumed her conversion overhaul at Norfolk Naval Shipyard.

Antares returned to active service in February 1960 to begin work as a general stores issue ship, which dictated a new pattern of employment in which she and the general stores issue ship USS Altair (AKS-32) were to alternate as station underway replenishment ship for the United States Sixth Fleet in the Mediterranean Sea. Whichever of the two was not on that duty would serve as backup while on the United States East Coast and in the West Indies.

Late in 1961, Antares received an additional mission when she was designated a support ship for fleet ballistic missile submarines deployed abroad, and she spent October and November 1961 receiving additional modifications at Norfolk Naval Shipyard and at Charleston, South Carolina, to enable her to carry out this additional duty. Between January and May 1962, she operated out of Norfolk, Virginia, conducting stores ship training and participating in a multiship exercise in the West Indies. In June 1962, she loaded supplies at Charleston and then steamed to Scotland on her first resupply voyage to the fleet ballistic missile base at Holy Loch. She returned to Norfolk on 25 July 1962 and then conducted local operations and went alongside a repair ship for repairs.

Antares departed Norfolk in September 1962 to relieve Altair in the Mediterranean Sea. That deployment proved to be a long one, since Altair's overhaul in the United States was delayed by the Cuban Missile Crisis in October 1962, making Altair unable to relieve Antares at Naples, Italy, until 30 May 1963. Antares finally returned to Norfolk early in June 1963 and, following repairs alongside the repair ship USS Cadmus (AR-14), operated along the United States East Coast for the remainder of 1963.

Following a resupply mission to the fleet ballistic missile base at Holy Loch in January 1964 and participation in the annual "Springboard" exercise near Puerto Rico, Antares returned to Norfolk later in the spring of 1964 to prepare for inactivation.

== Decommissioning and disposal ==
Antares reported to the Norfolk Group, Atlantic Reserve Fleet, on 15 September 1964 and was decommissioned there on 18 December 1964. She was laid up in the National Defense Reserve Fleet's James River Reserve Fleet on 30 March 1965. Her name was struck from the Navy list on 1 September 1965, and she was simultaneously transferred to the Maritime Administration.

Antares remained inactive in the James River Reserve Fleet until she was sold for scrapping on 5 April 1974 to the Union Minerals and Alloys Corporation, to which she was delivered on 31 May 1974.

== Honors ==
Crew of Naval Armed Guard on the SS Nampa Victory' earned "Battle Stars" in World War II for war action during the assault occupation of Okinawa from 24 June 1945 to 30 June 1945.

== Gallery ==
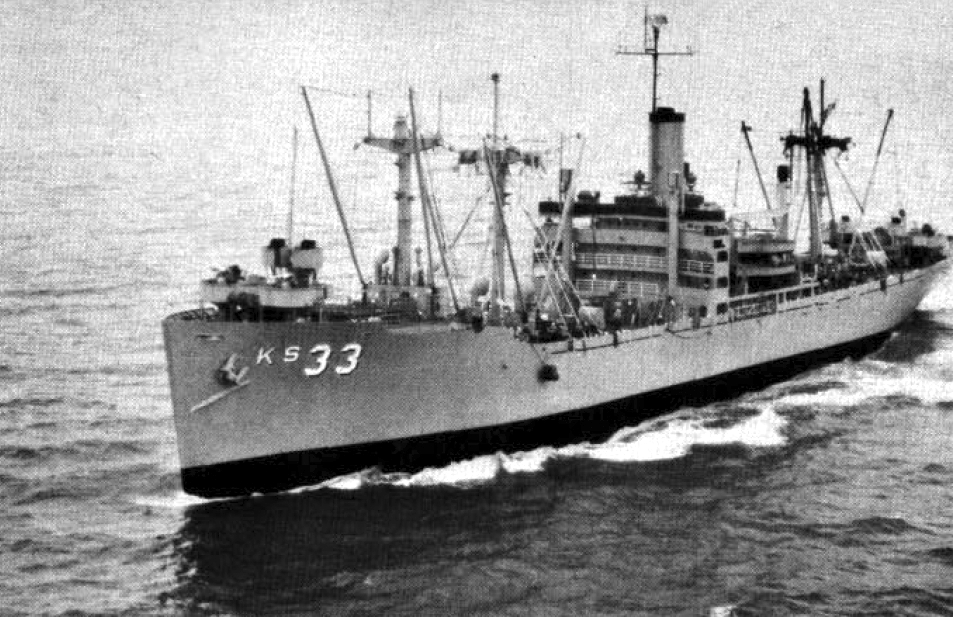
USS Antares (AKS-33) as a general stores issue ship.

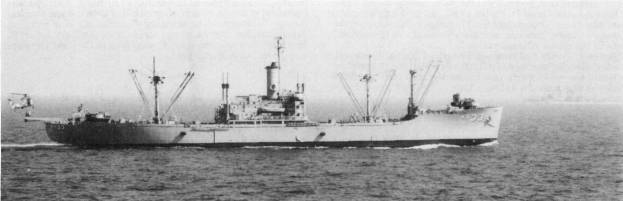
Antares (AKS-33) with a Sikorsky HUS-1 Seahorse helicopter hovering over her stern, as seen from the attack aircraft carrier USS Franklin D. Roosevelt (CVA-42) on 7 March 1963. The guided-missile frigate USS Dahlgren (DLG-12) is in the background.
- Liberty ship = Previous cargo ship.
- List of Victory ships
- Type C1 ship
- Type C2 ship
- Type C3 ship
