= SS Francisco Coronado =

Liberty ship of WWII

History

United States
- Name: Francisco Coronado
- Namesake: Francisco Vázquez de Coronado
- Operator: Pacific-Atlantic Steamship Company
- Builder: Kaiser Shipbuilding Company
- Way number: 1748
- Laid down: 18 November 1942
- Launched: 11 January 1943
- Completed: 20 January 1943
- Decommissioned: March 1962
- Fate: Scrapped 1962

General characteristics
- Class & type: Liberty ship; type EC2-S-C1, standard
- Tonnage: 10,865 LT DWT; 7,176 GRT
- Displacement: 3,380 long tons (3,434 t) (light); 14,245 long tons (14,474 t) (max)
- Length: 441 feet 6 inches (135 m) oa; 416 feet (127 m) pp; 427 feet (130 m) lwl
- Beam: 57 feet (17 m)
- Draft: 27 ft 9.25 in (8.4646 m)
- Installed power: 2 × Oil fired 450 °F (232 °C) boilers, operating at 220 psi (1,500 kPa); 2,500 hp (1,900 kW)
- Propulsion: 1 × triple-expansion steam engine, (manufactured by General Machinery Corp., Hamilton, Ohio); 1 × screw propeller
- Speed: 11.5 knots (21.3 km/h; 13.2 mph)
- Capacity: 562,608 cubic feet (15,931 m^{3}) (grain); 499,573 cubic feet (14,146 m^{3}) (bale)
- Complement: 38–62 USMM; 21–40 USNAG
- Armament: Varied by ship; Bow-mounted 3-inch (76 mm)/50-caliber gun; Stern-mounted 4-inch (102 mm)/50-caliber gun; 2–8 × single 20-millimeter (0.79 in) Oerlikon anti-aircraft (AA) cannons and/or, 2–8 × 37-millimeter (1.46 in) M1 AA guns

SS Francisco Coronado was a Liberty ship built in the United States during World War II. The ship was named after Francisco Vázquez de Coronado y Luján, a Spanish conquistador who explored the southwestern United States between 1540 and 1542. The ship was built at the Kaiser Shipbuilding Company's shipyard at Vancouver, Washington.

== Service history ==
SS Francisco Coronado was ordered by the United States Maritime Commission under contract number 394 from Kaiser Shipbuilding's Vancouver Shipyard as Yard number 42. She was operated by Pacific-Atlantic Steamship Company under charter with the Maritime Commission and War Shipping Administration. (Note: Another Kaiser yard, Oregon Shipbuilding Corporation, was awarded Maritime Commission contract number 1748, to be named Francisco Coronado (Yard number 674), but this contract was cancelled.) The ship was laid down on 18 November 1942. She was launched on 5 January 1943 and was completed on 20 January 1943.

The ship was sold for demolition to Patapsco Scrap Company on 9 March 1959, and broken up at Baltimore in March 1962.
