= SS Colgate Victory =

Victory ship of the United States

- Typical Liberty Ship at sea.

History

United States
- Name: SS Colgate Victory
- Namesake: Colgate University
- Owner: War Shipping Administration
- Operator: Pacific-Atlantic Steamship Company
- Builder: Oregon Shipbuilding Company Portland
- Laid down: January 9, 1945
- Launched: February 20, 1945
- Completed: March 21, 1945
- Fate: Sold

History

United States
- Name: SS Hong Kong Transport 1948
- Operator: Pacific Transport Lines
- Fate: Sold

History

United States
- Name: SS Illinois 1957
- Operator: Pacific Transport Lines
- Fate: Sold

History

United States
- Name: SS Illinois 1957
- Operator: Pacific Transport Lines
- Fate: Sold

History

United States
- Name: SS Illinois 1958
- Operator: States Steamship Co, San Francisco.
- Fate: Sold

History

United States
- Name: SS Oregon Victory 1962
- Operator: West Coast SS Company in Portland, Ore.
- Fate: Sold

History

United States
- Name: SS Ridgefield Victory 1964
- Operator: Saxis SS Co
- Fate: Sold

History

United States
- Name: SS Ridgefield Victory 1966
- Operator: Standard Steamship Corp, of Wilmington, Del.
- Fate: Sold

History

United States
- Name: SS Ridgefield Victory 1968
- Operator: U.S. Maritime Administration in laid up
- Fate: scrapped in 1969 in Bilbao, Spain.

General characteristics
- Class & type: VC2-S-AP3 Victory ship
- Tonnage: 7612 GRT, 4,553 NRT
- Displacement: 15,200 tons
- Length: 455 ft (139 m)
- Beam: 62 ft (19 m)
- Draught: 28 ft (8.5 m)
- Installed power: 8,500 shp (6,300 kW)
- Propulsion: HP & LP turbines geared to a single 20.5-foot (6.2 m) propeller
- Speed: 16.5 knots
- Boats & landing craft carried: 4 Lifeboats
- Complement: 62 Merchant Marine and 28 US Naval Armed Guards
- Armament: 1 × 5 inch (127 mm)/38 caliber gun; 1 × 3 inch (76 mm)/50 caliber gun; 8 × 20 mm Oerlikon

The SS Colgate Victory was the Second of 153 Victory ships built during World War II. She was launched by the Oregon Shipbuilding Corporation on December 15, 1944, completed on January 12, 1945. The ship's United States Maritime Commission designation was VC2-S-AP3, hull number 170 (1224) (MCV-170). The Maritime Commission turned her over to a civilian contractor, Pacific-Atlantic SS Company, for operation.

== World War II ==
The SS Colgate Victory was used as cargo ship in World War II operated by the Pacific-Atlantic Steamship Company under charter with the Maritime Commission and War Shipping Administration. Colgate Victory was 170 of the new 10,500-ton class ship known as Victory ships. Victory ships were designed to replace the earlier Liberty Ships. Liberty ships were designed to be used just for WW2. Victory ships were designed to last longer and serve the US Navy after the war. The Victory ship differed from a Liberty ship in that they were: faster, longer and wider, taller, a thinner stack set farther toward the superstructure and had a long raised forecastle.

SS Colgate Victory was loaded full with 6,000 pounds of blockbuster bomb 500 lb. bombs and sent to help with the Battle of Okinawa and the planned invasion of Japan. She delivered the bombs to Marshall Islands at Enewetak Atoll base and then some bombs to the Caroline Island base. The Ulithi Atoll in the Caroline Islands was used as a staging base for the invasion of Okinawa. She was close enough to see the atomic bombings of Hiroshima and Nagasaki on August 6 and 9, 1945. She survived the October 1945 Louise typhoon. June 19, 1945 the SS Tate sent a Medical Officers to help a crew member of Colgate Victory, just as they pass the International Date Line in the Pacific. In 1947 she helped in the rescue of a ship that hit a reef near Iwo Jima, all 39 persons aboard the wrecked cargo freighter were moved to small boat and transferred to the SS Colgate Victory. She returned them to Los Angeles Colgate Victory arrived to San Francisco from Manila on March 2, 1947.

== Post war use ==
She was sold on May 25, 1948, to Pacific Transport Lines of San Francisco and renamed SS Hong Kong Transport for $996,160.37. In 1957 sold to the Pacific Transport Lines renamed her SS Illinois. In 1958 she was sold to the States Steamship Co, San Francisco. In 1961 she was sold to the US Department of Commerce and laid up in San Francisco. In 1962 she was sold to the West Coast SS Company in Portland, Ore. renamed SS Oregon Victory used as a Merchant Mariner ship again. In 1964 she was sold to Saxis SS Co and renamed the SS Ridgefield Victory used as a Merchant Mariner ship. In 1966 she was sold Standard Steamship Corp, Wilmington, Del. kept name Ridgefield Victory used as a Merchant Mariner ship. Ridgefield Victory was on Bangkok, Thailand, on January 12, 1967, when one of the Merchant Mariner seaman deserted she, court case came to be due to this action. In 1968 she was transfer back to the U.S. Maritime Administration and laid up. She was scrapped in Dec. of 1969 in Bilbao, Spain.

== See also ==
- List of Victory ships
- Liberty ship
- Type C1 ship
- Type C2 ship
- Type C3 ship

== Sources ==
- Sawyer, L.A. and W.H. Mitchell. Victory ships and tankers: The history of the ‘Victory’ type cargo ships and of the tankers built in the United States of America during World War II, Cornell Maritime Press, 1974, 0-87033-182-5.
- United States Maritime Commission:
- Victory Cargo Ships
