= SS Luxembourg Victory =

Victory ship of the United States

- A typical Victory ship

History

United States
- Name: SS Luxembourg Victory
- Namesake: Luxembourg
- Owner: War Shipping Administration
- Operator: Lykes Brothers Steamship Company
- Builder: Oregon Shipbuilding Company Portland
- Laid down: December 26, 1943
- Launched: February 28, 1944
- Completed: April 5, 1944
- Honors and awards: Battle Stars
- Fate: Sold to private company in 1951

United States
- Name: SS Pennsylvania
- Owner: States Steamship Company of Tacoma, Washington
- Fate: Sank January 9, 1952 in the North Pacific, crew lost.

General characteristics
- Class & type: VC2-S-AP3 Victory ship
- Tonnage: 7,612 GRT; 4,553 NRT
- Displacement: 15,200 tons
- Length: 455 ft (139 m)
- Beam: 62 ft (19 m)
- Draft: 28 ft (8.5 m)
- Installed power: 8,500 shp (6,300 kW)
- Propulsion: HP & LP turbines geared to a single 20.5-foot (6.2 m) propeller
- Speed: 16.5 knots (30.6 km/h; 19.0 mph)
- Boats & landing craft carried: 4 lifeboats
- Complement: 62 Merchant Marine and 28 US Naval Armed Guards
- Armament: 1 × 5-inch (127 mm)/38 caliber gun; 1 × 3-inch (76 mm)/50 caliber gun; 8 × 20 mm Oerlikon (as Victory ship)

SS Luxembourg Victory was a Victory ship built for the United States during World War II. She was launched by the Oregon Shipbuilding Corporation on February 28, 1944, and was completed on April 5, 1944. The ship's US Maritime Commission designation was VC2-S-AP3, hull number 90 (V-90). She was built in 101 days under the Emergency Shipbuilding program. The Maritime Commission turned her over to a civilian contractor, the Lykes Brothers SS Company, for operation until the end of World War II hostilities. She was operated under the US Merchant Marine Act for the War Shipping Administration.

Victory ships were designed to replace the earlier Liberty ships. Liberty ships were designed to be used solely for World War II, while Victory ships were designed to last longer and serve the US Navy after the war. The Victory ship differed from a Liberty ship in that they were faster, longer, wider, and taller, had a thinner stack set farther toward the superstructure and had a long raised forecastle.

SS Luxembourg Victory serviced in the Pacific Theater of Operations during the last months of World War II in the Pacific War. Luxembourg Victory took supplies to support the Battle of the Philippines as part of Task Group 30.8.

== World War II ==
SS Luxembourg Victory survived a typhoon in June 1944 on her maiden trip. Along with SS Mayfield Victory, she serviced the tank landing ships USS LST-865 and USS LST-868 in July 1944 at Buckner Bay. She supplied cargo for the Battle of Guam from July 21 to August 10, 1944. Luxembourg Victory survived her second typhoon in December 1944. At the Battle of Leyte, Luxembourg Victory used her deck guns to fire at enemy planes on November 12 and 24, 1944 to defend both herself and other ships. She was at Leyte for 33 days and had 156 air alerts. Luxembourg Victory took supplies to support the troops at the Battle of Okinawa from April 1 to June 22, 1945. She had repair work at sea after the Battle of Okinawa on July 1, 1945. After ending her World War II service, Luxembourg Victory steamed from Apra Harbor, Guam to Portland, Oregon, arriving on August 27, 1947.

In 1949, she was laid up in Suisun Bay in California as part of the National Defense Reserve Fleet.

== Korean War ==
In 1950, she was put back in service for the Korean War as a Military Sea Transportation Service (MSTS) charter for the US Navy. She helped move the 140th Medium Tank Battalion. SS Luxembourg Victory transported goods, mail, food and other supplies, completing trips between 1950 and 1951. SS Luxembourg Victory carried 80 medium tanks to Korea for Eighth United States Army on July 28, 1950, for the Battle of Pusan Perimeter logistics operation. She participated in the Iwon-Hungnam landings in November 1950 during the United Nations Offense campaign.

== Honors ==
Luxemburg Victory earned Battle Stars for her combat action, from November 5 to November 29, 1944, in supporting of the Leyte landings.

== Private use ==
In 1951 she was sold to the States Steamship Company of Tacoma, Washington and renamed SS Pennsylvania. On January 9, 1952, Pennsylvania departed Puget Sound loaded with $1.445 million worth of wheat for Japan. While she was entering the North Pacific off Cape Flattery, off of the northern tip of Vancouver Island, Canada, she battled gale winds up to 50 miles per hour (80 km/h) and very rough seas. At about 450 miles (390 nmi; 720 km) west of Cape Flattery, her hull started to crack. She suffered a 14-foot-long (4.3 m) hull crack on her port side. Her engine room was flooding and she had a heavy angle of list. The 45-foot (14 m) seas pounded her into the night. Captain George P. Plover send out a SOS distress message and gave the abandon ship order at 51.09N 141.13W on January 9, 1952.

The 45-man crew lowered and boarded the four 26-foot (7.9 m) lifeboats in 40-foot (12 m) waves, while the abandoned ship sank. About 75 miles (65 nmi; 121 km) southwest of their position, the Japanese ship SS Kimikawa Maru had received the SOS distress message and arrived at about 10 am on January 10, 1952. She found only overturned lifeboats and debris from the ship. Planes from McChord Air Force Base, the US Coast Guard, the Whidbey Island Naval Air Station and ships from the Royal Canadian Navy arrived to search for survivors. The vast search was run by the 13th Coast Guard District Headquarters in Seattle and covered 11,000 square miles (28,000 km^{2}) of sea. The search was eventually ended with no survivors found.

Pennsylvania hull crack was similar to the structural failures, which had been a problem with other World War II welded steel ships. However, the problem was more noted in older Liberty ships, not Victory ships.

Court cases and new laws over Pennsylvania sinking continued for 22 years after the disaster.

== Sources ==
- Sawyer, L.A. and W.H. Mitchell. Victory ships and tankers: The history of the 'Victory' type cargo ships and of the tankers built in the United States of America during World War II, Cornell Maritime Press, 1974, 0-87033-182-5.
- United States Maritime Commission:
- Victory Cargo Ships
- Appleman, Roy E. (1998), South to the Naktong, North to the Yalu: United States Army in the Korean War, Washington, D.C.: Department of the Army, ISBN 978-0-16-001918-0, archived from the original on 2014-02-07 p. 259
