= USS Altair (AK-257) =

Cargo ship of the United States Navy

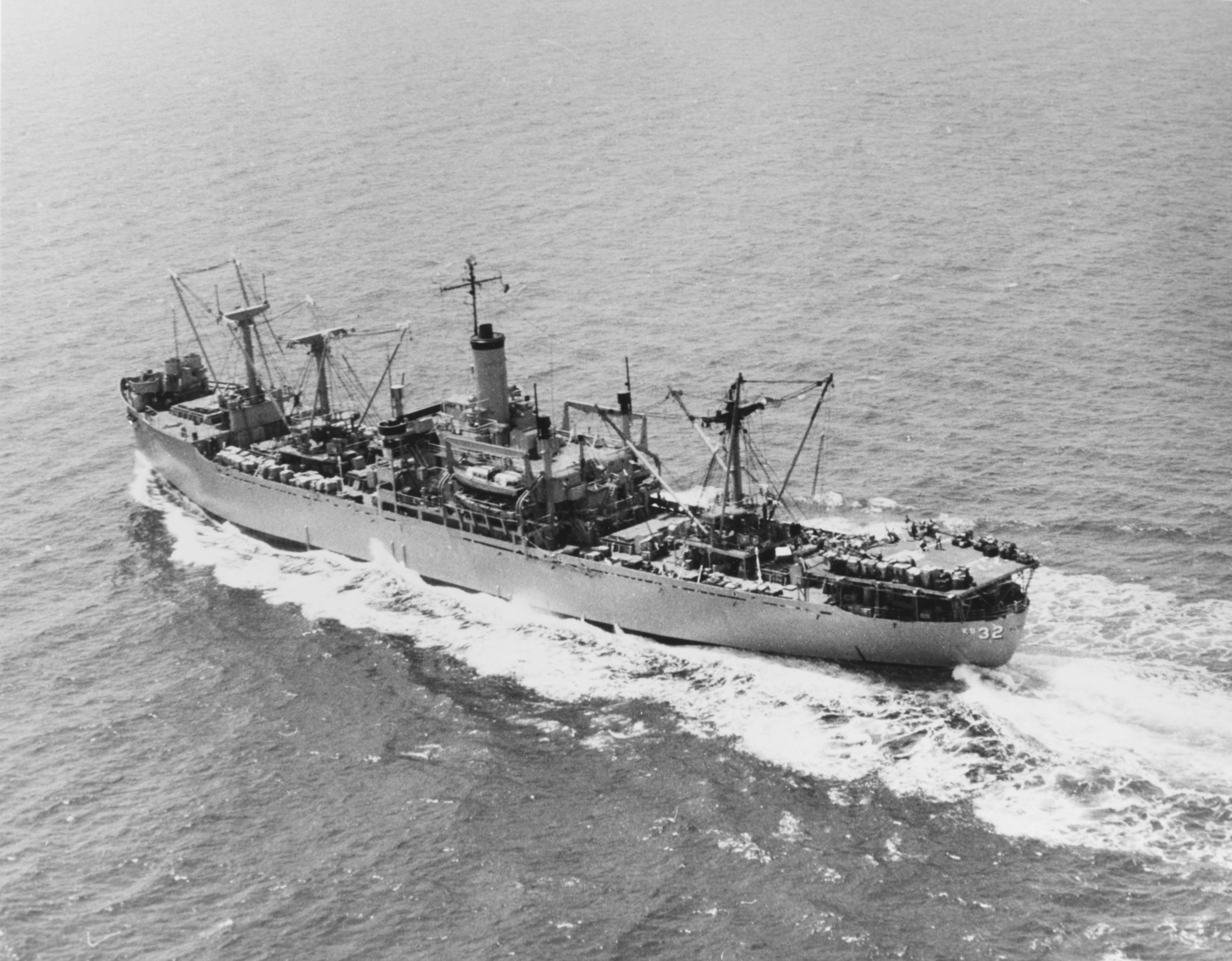
- USS Altair (AKS-32) underway in 1966. From the appearance of her decks and helicopter landing pad, aft, she is ready to commence an underway replenishment.

History

United States
- Name: Aberdeen Victory; Altair
- Namesake: Seventeen cities in sixteen States in the United States have the name Aberdeen; Altair
- Operator: Waterman Steamship Company
- Ordered: as type (VC2-S-AP2) hull, MCV hull 110
- Builder: Oregon Shipbuilding Corporation, Portland, Oregon
- Laid down: 20 April 1944, as SS Aberdeen Victory
- Launched: 30 May 1944
- Sponsored by: Mrs. A. L. M. Wiggins
- Completed: 22 June 1944
- Acquired: 7 July 1951, by the USN
- Commissioned: 31 January 1952, as USS Altair (AK-257)
- Decommissioned: 5 January 1953
- Refit: 5 January 1953, converted to a General Stores Issue Ship Antares-class General Stores Issue Ship
- Identification: Hull symbol:AK-257; Hull symbol:AKS-32
- Recommissioned: 15 December 1953, as USS Altair (AKS-32)
- Decommissioned: 2 May 1969
- Stricken: 1 June 1973
- Fate: Sold for scrapping, 31 January 1975, to Luria Brothers & Co., Philadelphia, PA.

General characteristics
- Class & type: Greenville Victory-class cargo ship 1945-1953; Antares-class general stores issue ship 1953-1969
- Displacement: 4,960 metric tons (4,880 long tons)
- Length: 455 ft 3 in (138.76 m)
- Beam: 62 ft (19 m)
- Draft: 28 ft 6 in (8.69 m)
- Installed power: 8,500 shp (6,300 kW)
- Propulsion: 1 × steam turbine; 1 × shaft
- Speed: 16.5 knots (30.6 km/h; 19.0 mph)
- Complement: 250
- Armament: 4 × 40 mm (1.6 in) Bofors antiaircraft guns (2×2)
- Aviation facilities: Helicopter deck added in 1959

The second USS Altair (AK-257) was a United States Navy Greenville Victory-class cargo ship in commission from 1952 to 1953. She was converted into a Antares-class general stores issue ship (AKS-32) in 1953 and was in commission as such from 1953 to 1969, seeing extensive service during the Cold War. Prior to her U.S. Navy career, she had operated as the merchant ship SS Aberdeen Victory during the latter stages of World War II.

== Construction ==
SS Aberdeen Victory was a Maritime Commission type VC2-S-AP3 hull laid down on 20 April 1944 at Portland, Oregon, by the Oregon Shipbuilding Corporation under a Maritime Commission contract as MCV hull 110. She was launched on 20 May 1944, sponsored by Mrs. A. L. M. Wiggins, and completed on 22 June 1944.

== World War II operations as SS Aberdeen Victory ==
Aberdeen Victory entered mercantile service as a cargo ship under contract with the Waterman Steamship Company, under whose flag she supported World War II operations against Japan and took part in the Okinawa campaign during May 1945. Following the end of the war, she was assigned to the National Defense Reserve Fleet and laid up in the Suisun Bay Reserve Fleet in Suisun Bay, California.

== United States Navy service ==
=== USS Altair (AK-257) ===
The U.S. Navy acquired Aberdeen Victory on 7 July 1951 and renamed her Altair on 26 July 1951. Classified as a cargo ship (AK) and designated AK-257, she was commissioned at Baltimore, Maryland, on 31 January 1952 as USS Altair (AK-257).

Assigned to the United States Atlantic Fleet Service Force, Altair was initially based at Norfolk, Virginia, and visited Annapolis, Maryland, from 29 to 31 March 1952 and Guantanamo Bay, Cuba, from 26 May to 2 June 1952 during the course of her shakedown. Soon thereafter, she commenced her first deployment to the Mediterranean Sea to support the United States Sixth Fleet, crossing the Atlantic Ocean to arrive at Gibraltar on 29 June 1952. She departed Gibraltar on 30 June 1952 and steamed to Golfe-Juan, France, where she arrived on 2 July 1952. She remained there until 12 July 1952, when she departed for Naples, Italy. From Naples, she steamed to Casablanca, French Morocco.

Altair cleared Casablanca on 26 July 1952 to return to the United States and reached Norfolk on 4 August 1952.

=== USS Altair (AKS-32) ===
Anticipating conversion to a general stores issue ship (AKS), Altair was redesignated AKS-32 on 12 August 1952. She was decommissioned at the Norfolk Naval Shipyard in Portsmouth, Virginia, on 5 January 1953 and taken to Baltimore, where she underwent conversion at the Maryland Drydock Company to prepare her for her new role as a stores issue ship.

Recommissioned at Norfolk on 15 December 1953, Altair rejoined the Atlantic Fleet and, following her shakedown, reported for duty on 20 March 1954. A little over two months later, on 24 May, she departed for her second Mediterranean deployment with the Sixth Fleet, and reached the Hyères Islands, off the southeast coast of France, on 10 June 1954 for a week's stay. She then steamed on to Naples and Cagliari, Italy, and to Golfe-Juan before paying a return call at Naples. She then visited Palma de Majorca before reaching Gibraltar on 11 August 1954 en route the United States. During this deployment, Altair also conducted two underway replenishments with Task Force 63, the first from 29 June to 2 July 1954 and the second on 2 August 1954.

Arriving at Norfolk on 23 August 1954, Altair operated between Norfolk and New York City and Baltimore through the autumn of 1954, ultimately departing Norfolk on 15 November 1954 for Gibraltar and her third deployment with the Sixth Fleet. Over the next few months, she called at Gibraltar; Barcelona, Spain; Genoa, Italy; Cartagena, Spain; Mers-el-Kebir and Algiers in Algeria; and three times at Naples before she closed out her deployment at Gibraltar on 24 February 1955 and steamed for Norfolk.

In May 1955, Altair's home port was changed to Barcelona, and she cleared Norfolk on 26 May 1955 bound for Gibraltar and Barcelona. In February 1960, the former cargo ship USS Antares (AK-258) returned to active service as USS Antares (AKS-33) after having been converted into a general stores issue ship. Altair and Antares were to alternate as station underway replenishment ship for the Sixth Fleet in the Mediterranean Sea. Whichever of the two was not on that duty would serve as backup while on the United States East Coast and in the West Indies.

After being based at Barcelona, Altair returned to the United States from time to time for overhaul and modification. In 1959 she received a helicopter landing platform to enable her to carry out early vertical replenishment operations to supply ships at sea, which she and the fleet oiler USS Mississinewa (AO-144) pioneered with the Sixth Fleet in the Mediterranean Sea in 1962 using Sikorsky HSS-2 Sea King (later redesignated SH-3A Sea King) antisubmarine helicopters. She also received a complete material handling system which included new elevators, forklifts, trucks, conveyor belts, and the first electronic accounting system to be placed on board a ship, which greatly facilitated her task of keeping track of the more than 25,000 items on her general stores inventory.

Altair's helicopter rescued a United States Air Force fighter pilot on 8 September 1961 after he had had to bail out off the coast of Spain. On 17 March 1962, she sent a rescue and assistance detail to aid the distressed Italian passenger ship SS Venezuela off Cannes, France; while a damage control party operated portable pumps to contain flooding, Altair's medical corpsmen helped over 800 passengers to evacuate Venezuela. A few weeks later, Altair provided emergency medical assistance to a critically ill Greek national on Koso Island in the southern Aegean Sea; her helicopter flew the patient to Athens for further treatment. On 17 August 1962, she took part in relief operations for homeless repatriates in Algeria by taking 1,000 tents to Bône. In August 1962, her home port was shifted to Naples.

Altair returned to the United States in October 1962 for overhaul but was abruptly ordered to the Caribbean Sea to replenish American warships enforcing the quarantine of Cuba during the Cuban Missile Crisis. After this crisis subsided, she proceeded to Boston, Massachusetts, for an overhaul which lasted into the spring of 1963. This delay meant that Altair was unable to relieve Antares, which had deployed to the Mediterranean in September 1962, on schedule. Altair departed Norfolk on 18 May 1963 and reached Naval Station Rota, Spain, on 30 May 1963, finally relieving Antares on that date.

On 13 June 1963, Altair assisted in the rescue of an Italian man who had fallen from the seawall while fishing at Naples.

In June 1965, Altair's home port was changed to Norfolk, and she operated from that base until reporting to the Inactive Ship Maintenance Facility in Portsmouth, Virginia, on 31 December 1968.

== Decommissioning and disposal ==
Altair was decommissioned on 2 May 1969. On 1 September 1971, her title was transferred to the Maritime Administration, which took custody of her on 1 May 1973. Her name was struck from the Naval Vessel Register on 1 June 1973, and she was laid up in the James River Reserve Fleet in Virginia's James River. She was sold for scrapping to Luria Brothers and Company on 31 January 1975.

== Honors ==
Crew of Naval Armed Guard on the SS Aberdeen Victory' earned "Battle Stars" in World War II for war action with her deck guns, during the assault occupation of Okinawa from 3 May 1945 to 16 May 1945.

== Gallery ==
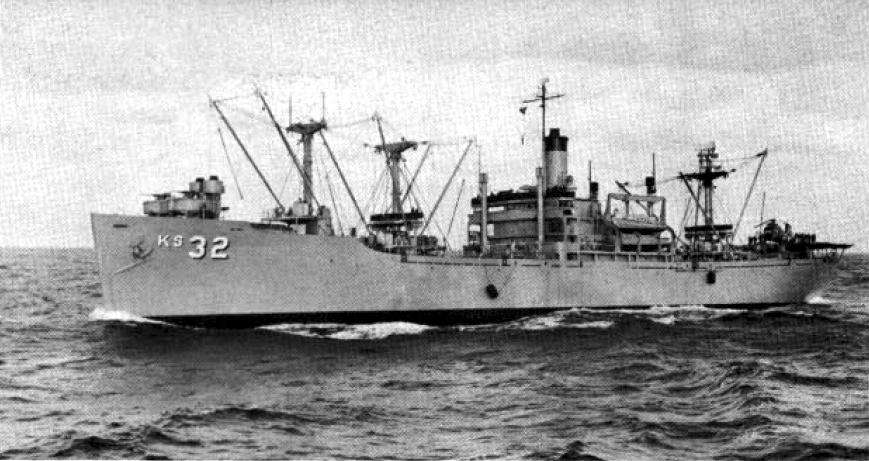
Altair underway sometime between 1959 and 1962.

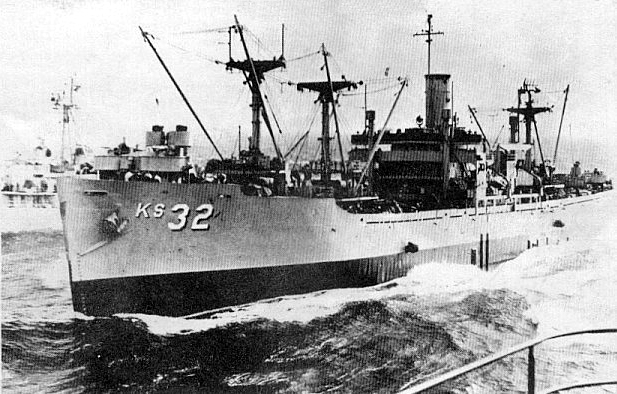
Altair underway in the Mediterranean Sea ca. 1963.

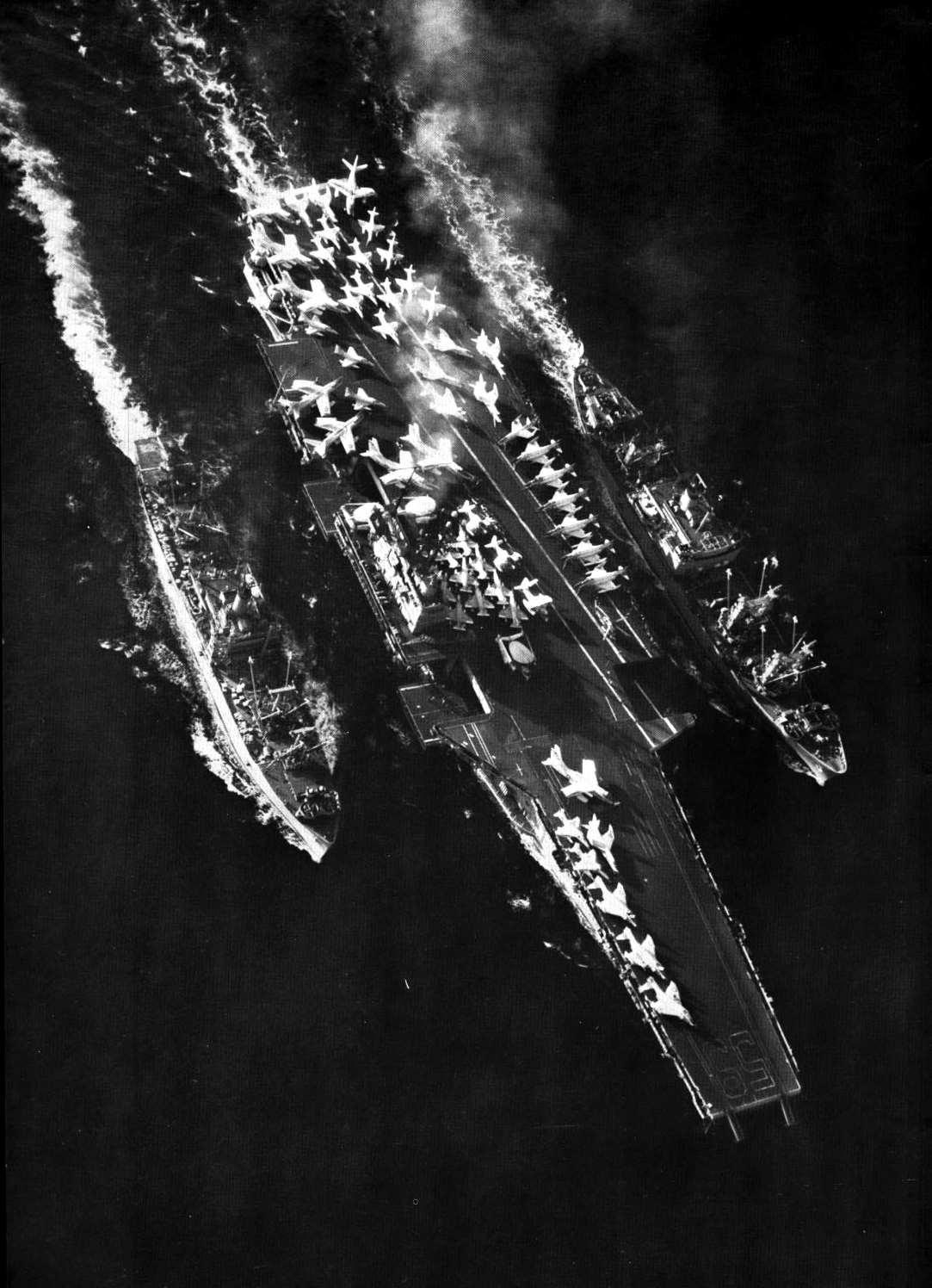
Altair (left) and the ammunition ship USS Nitro (AE-23) (right) conduct a simultaneous underway replenishment of stores and ammunition (respectively) of the attack aircraft carrier USS Forrestal (CVA-59) (center) in the Tyrrhenian Sea on 8 January 1965.
