= SS Wheatland Montana =

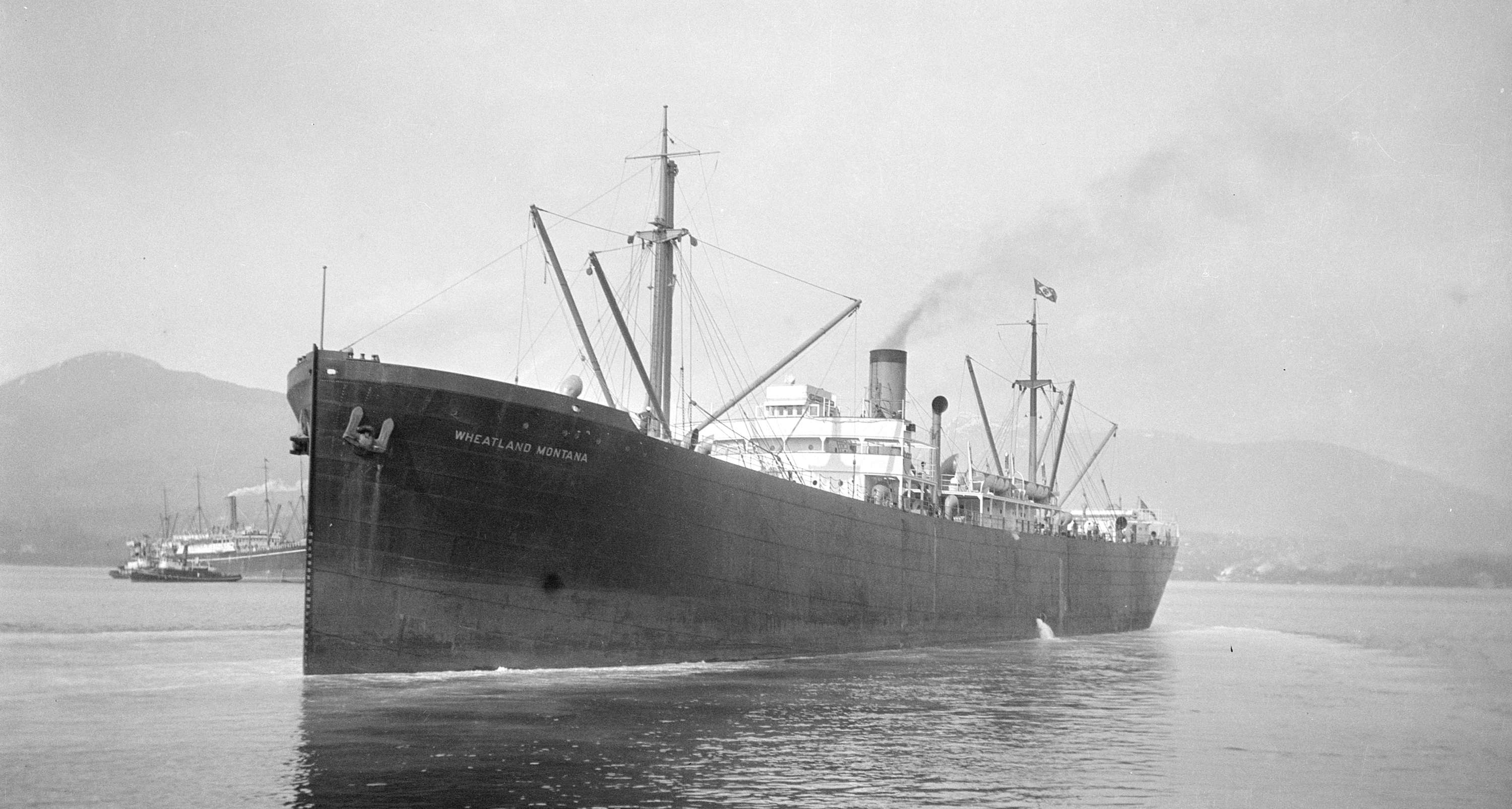
- SS Wheatland Montana in Vancouver

History

United States
- Name: Wheatland Montana (1920–1928); Seattle (1928–1937); Lihue (1937–1942)
- Namesake: Wheatland
- Owner: USSB (1919–1928); Tacoma Oriental Steamship Co. (1928–1937); Matson Navigation Co. (1937–1942)
- Operator: Pacific Steamship Co. (1919–1928); Tacoma Oriental Steamship Co. (1928–1937); Matson Navigation Co. (1937–1942)
- Ordered: 1 June 1918
- Builder: Skinner & Eddy, Seattle
- Cost: $2,002,324.33
- Yard number: 54
- Laid down: 26 March 1919
- Launched: 4 August 1919
- Sponsored by: Miss Juanita Cook
- Completed: 30 August 1919
- Commissioned: 3 September 1919
- Maiden voyage: 23 September 1919
- Home port: Seattle (1919–1933); Tacoma (1933–1937); San Francisco (1937–1942)
- Identification: US Official Number 218849; Call sign LSQN (1919–1933); Call sign KISF (1934–1942)
- Fate: Sank, 26 February 1942

General characteristics
- Type: Design 1079 Ship
- Tonnage: 7,001 GRT; 5,454 NRT; 9,962 DWT
- Length: 410.1 ft (125.0 m)
- Beam: 54.2 ft (16.5 m)
- Draft: 24 ft 5/8 in (7.331 m) (mean)
- Depth: 27.1 ft (8.3 m)
- Installed power: 359 Nhp, 2,800 ihp
- Propulsion: Hooven, Owens, Rentschler & Co. 3-cylinder triple expansion
- Speed: 11 1/2 knots (13.2 mph; 21.3 km/h)
- Armament: During WWII; 1 × 3-inch naval gun; 2 × .30 cal (7.62 mm) machine guns; 4 × .50 caliber (12.7 mm) machine guns

SS Wheatland Montana was a cargo steamship built in 1919 by Skinner & Eddy of Seattle for the United States Shipping Board as part of the wartime shipbuilding program of the Emergency Fleet Corporation (EFC) to restore the nation's Merchant Marine. The freighter spent the majority of her career in the Pacific connecting the West Coast of the United States with the Chinese and Japanese ports in the Far East. Early in 1928 the ship, together with six other vessels, was sold by the Shipping Board to the Tacoma Oriental Steamship Co. and subsequently renamed Seattle. After her owner declared bankruptcy early in 1937, the ship was sold to Matson Navigation Company and renamed Lihue. She was then mainly employed to transport sugar and canned fruit from the Hawaiian Islands to the ports on the East Coast of the United States. In February 1942, she was chartered to transport general cargo and war supplies to the Middle East but was torpedoed by U-161 in the Caribbean Sea on February 23, and eventually sank three days later while under tow without loss of life.

== Design and construction ==
After the United States' entry into World War I, a large shipbuilding program was undertaken in the country both to restore and enhance the nation's shipping capabilities and those of its allies. As part of this program, the EFC placed orders with the nation's shipyards for a large number of vessels of standard designs. The Design 1079 cargo ship was a modified Design 1013 standard cargo freighter of approximately 9,600 tons deadweight tonnage designed by Skinner & Eddy and adopted by the USSB.

Wheatland Montana was part of the order for 47 vessels placed by USSB with Skinner & Eddy on 1 June 1918 and was laid down on 26 March 1919 at the shipbuilder's yard and launched on 4 August 1919 (yard number 54), with Miss Juanita Cook of Judith Gap, Montana being the sponsor. The vessel was named in honor of town of Wheatland in Montana whose residents finished first in their district in subscription for the Liberty Loan. The ship was of a three-deck type, had five main holds and also possessed all the modern machinery for quick loading and unloading of cargo from five main hatches, including ten winches and a large number of derricks. The vessel had electric lights installed along the decks and was also equipped with wireless.

As built, the ship was 410.1 feet (125.0 m) long (between perpendiculars) and 54.2 feet (16.5 m) abeam, a depth of 27.1 feet (8.3 m). Wheatland Montana was originally assessed at 7,001 GRT and 5,451 NRT and had deadweight of approximately 9,962. The vessel had a steel hull, and a single 359 nhp triple-expansion steam engine, with cylinders of 24 1/2-inch (62 cm), 41 1/2-inch (105 cm) and 72-inch (180 cm) diameter with a 48-inch (120 cm) stroke, that drove a single screw propeller, and moved the ship at up to 11 1/2 knots (13.2 mph; 21.3 km/h). The steam for the engine was supplied by three Scotch marine boilers fitted for both coal and oil fuel.

After successfully completing her six hour long trial trip on August 30, Wheatland Montana was handed over to the USSB on the same day, and officially commissioned on September 3.

== Operational history ==
Following delivery to USSB the ship was immediately handed over to Pacific Mail Steamship Company to operate on the West Coast of the United States to the Orient route. After loading 9,000 tons cargo consisting mainly of auto trucks, cotton and various metal products, the ship sailed from Seattle for the Far East on 23 September 1919. After visiting ports of Japan, China and the Philippines the steamer returned to Seattle on December 21, thus successfully completing her maiden voyage. The freighter continued sailing between the North Pacific ports of the United States and the ports in Japan, China and the Philippines initially as part of the Admiral Line, and later American Oriental Mail Line, through the early part of 1928. On her westward trips the ship carried mostly lumber, but also grain, flour, herring and metal products while on her return journeys she would transport sugar, copra, hemp, mahogany, peanuts, various vegetable oils and other oriental merchandise. For example, in early January 1921 the freighter took on board 1,750,000 feet of lumber from Dollar Mills in Vancouver and 250 tons of general cargo before sailing for East Asia. On one of her return trips, she brought back about 5,000 tons of hemp from Manila and other cargo to Seattle and Vancouver.

During her career Wheatland Montana came to other vessels help on several occasions. In early January 1924 when Admiral Line's steamer SS Harold Dollar steering gear got jammed by a shifted deckload of lumber, Wheatland Montana rushed to aid and stood by until the problem was resolved and the freighter could safely proceed to her destination. In February 1925 when SS Patrick Henry went aground on shoals off Wada, Wheatland Montana came to her aid and pulled the steamer off.

On 1 April 1926 while on her way from Qingdao to Puget Sound ports with a large cargo of hemp, peanuts and mahogany logs, Wheatland Montana lost her propeller and rudder post, and was drifting helplessly in stormy weather. Two days later another Admiral Line steamer, West Niger, came to her aid and took the disabled freighter in tow. As the weather got worse the tow line separated and the ships had to wait out until the wind died down. After about two weeks of towing and about 700 miles from the Puget Sound, West Niger was relieved by yet another Admiral Oriental Line steamer, SS City of Spokane who brought the disabled freighter safely to port on April 24.

On 10 February 1928 it was announced that USSB decided to get out of shipping business and accepted bids for the three Pacific Lines they were operating at the time. On February 16 it was announced USSB disposed of all three lines including the American Oriental Mail Line. The line was sold together with seven ships it operated for $696,906 to a new concern, Tacoma Oriental Steamship Co., formed by local Tacoma businessmen and headed by John Sherman Baker. Wheatland Montana was one of the vessels sold, and was valued at $104,601 as part of the transaction. Following the acquisition, the new owner decided to rename all vessels in honor of Washington ports, with Wheatland Montana slated to become Seattle. At the time of acquisition, the ship was still chartered for one more trip to the Far East, and therefore continued to operate temporarily under her old name and USSB control. On May 12 it was reported that the freighter called into Tianjin with a cracked tunnel shaft, and was forced to proceed to Dalian for temporary repairs. On her return trip, Wheatland Montana again developed problems with her rudder and had to be taken into tow by steamer SS West Nomentum. Approximately 700 miles from the Puget Sound West Nomentum was forced to pause due to her fuel running low, and both ships had to await the arrival of the US Coast Guard cutter Algonquin which safely brought the disabled steamer into port. After completion of repairs, the ship was officially rechristened Seattle on 2 August 1928 in the presence of a large crowd, and after loading full cargo of lumber and general merchandise departed for her first voyage under new name and ownership for Dalian on August 6.

Under new ownership, Seattle continued sailing on the same routes as previously carrying cargo between the ports of the Pacific Northwest and China and Japan. In this role Tacoma Oriental Line came into direct competition with American Mail Line, a subsidiary of Dollar Steamship Company, who after several attempts managed to acquire in December 1931 John S. Baker's controlling interest in Tacoma-based company. Tacoma Steamship Company continued to operate as an independent entity through 1937 between the same ports in the United States and Canadian Northwest and respective destinations in China, Japan and the Philippines. In the fall 1932 Seattle and the rest of Tacoma-based vessels were put on the twin-shuttle route taking them to California ports of Los Angeles and San Francisco in addition to their regularly served destinations. In February 1935 Seattle ran aground on Turia Rock while on her way from Manila to Cebu. The ship suffered little damage and was lifted off with the aid of tugs and was able to proceed to her destination.

The company finally became profitable in 1933, however, a series of labor disputes in 1934–1935, including a 1934 maritime strike which tied the company's vessels for many months, expiration and non-renewal of the government mail subsidy for the 1936 season, forced the company to default on their debt and file for reorganization early in 1936. The vessels belonging to Tacoma Oriental were chartered out short term to other companies, with Seattle being taken over by her parent company, Dollar Steamship. In April 1936 due to increase in traffic Seattle was used by Dollar for one trip to transport a large cargo of cotton, scrap tin, used rails and other general merchandise from California to Japan. The ship was subsequently put on Dollar's Guam service, but only remained in it until the end of 1936. In September 1936 Tacoma Oriental Line sold two vessels to Waterman Steamship Co., and attempted to re-enter business with five remaining vessels, including Seattle, but the bid proved to be unsuccessful due to yet another labor strike, and the company was finally liquidated by court order in February 1937 with all five vessels being sold to Matson Navigation Company.

After court approved acquisition of the vessels, Matson Navigation Co. renamed them after their affiliated sugar plantations in the Hawaiian Islands, with Seattle becoming Lihue. Lihue departed San Francisco for her first voyage under her new name and new ownership on 17 March 1937 bound for Honolulu. After loading a cargo consisting of 7,385 tons of sugar and canned pineapples, the ship departed Hawaii on April 10 for East Coast ports of New York, Philadelphia and Baltimore, passed through the Panama Canal on May 5 and reached her destination on May 20. On her return voyage the freighter departed Baltimore on May 31 loaded with 5,180 tons of cargo consisting of steel and general merchandise, and reached Honolulu on July 3. Lihue continued sailing on West to East coast routes between the ports of Hawaii, California and Pacific Northwest and Baltimore, New York and Philadelphia through the end of her career carrying sugar and canned fruit on her eastward journeys, and steel products and general merchandise when sailing westward. The freighter was occasionally used on other routes, for example, she sailed from the Pacific Northwest ports to Liverpool in November 1937 carrying 8,024 tons of cargo consisting of wheat, lumber and fish.

=== Sinking ===
With the United States entry into the World War II in December 1941 many ships were requisitioned by the United States government and put under control of the War Shipping Administration (WSA). Lihue was chartered for one trip to Alexandria to deliver general cargo and war matériel to the British troops fighting in North Africa. Upon loading her cargo the ship sailed from New York in mid-February 1942 bound for Trinidad where the freighter was scheduled to bunker before proceeding to her next stop at Cape Town. The vessel was under command of captain W. G. Leithead and had a crew of eight officers and twenty-eight men in addition to nine Navy gunners. At approximately 23:34 local time on 22 February 1942 Lihue was spotted by a lookout from German submarine U-161 under command of captain Achilles, approximately 275 nautical miles (509 km; 316 mi) west of Martinique moving at approximately 8 knots (9.2 mph; 15 km/h). At 00:43 on February 23 a torpedo was launched by the submarine and after 126 seconds the ship was struck on her port side just forward of the #1 hold. The steamer started to take on water immediately but was able to continue on her course and maintain her speed. About fifteen minutes later seeing that the freighter does not sink, U-161 opened fire with her deck gun but the steamer's gun crew returned fire with both her main guns and machine guns forcing the submarine to crash dive. U-161 continued shadowing the steamer for the next four hours trying to deliver coup de grâce but due to the freighter's zig-zagging the U-boat could never get into a good attack position. At approximately 09:45 Lihue changed course and headed for St. Lucia. At 12:39 U-161 fired another torpedo at the vessel from approximately 600 meters but the ship again suddenly changed course avoiding being hit. At about the same time captain Leithead ordered the crew to abandon ship. The crew and the gunners disembarked the ship in two lifeboats and three rafts, and shortly after U-161 fired two more torpedoes from approximately 900 meters, only to see them miss the vessel again. The submarine stayed in the area for four more hours but due to arrival of patrol aircraft and commander Achilles's belief that the vessel was a Q-ship the submarine broke off the pursuit and left the area. The crew of Lihue was soon taken aboard the British tanker SS British Governor and landed safely in Trinidad next day. A salvage crew from the Canadian armed merchant cruiser Prince Henry boarded abandoned Lihue and the freighter was taken into tow by the US minesweeper Partridge, however, due to significant amount of damage sustained by the freighter during and after the attack she sank on February 26 while in tow not far from St. Lucia.
