= SS West Niger =

US steam cargo ship (1920–1932)

Coordinates: 51°16′N 179°06′W

History

United States
- Name: West Niger (1920–1928); Nevada (1928–1932)
- Owner: USSB (1920–1928); States Steamship Co. (1928–1932)
- Operator: Pacific Mail Steamship Co. (1920); Columbia Pacific Shipping Co. (1923–1928); States Steamship Co. (1928–1932)
- Ordered: 10 July 1918
- Builder: Southwestern Shipbuilding Co., San Pedro
- Cost: $1,874,853.67
- Yard number: 12
- Laid down: 17 April 1919
- Launched: 28 September 1919
- Commissioned: 31 January 1920
- Maiden voyage: 18 February 1920
- Home port: Los Angeles (1920–1928); Portland (1928–1932)
- Identification: US Official Number 219522; Code letters LVKR
- Fate: Wrecked, 27 September 1932

General characteristics
- Type: Design 1019 cargo ship
- Tonnage: 5,645 GRT; 3,517 NRT; 8,542 DWT
- Length: 410.5 ft (125.1 m)
- Beam: 54.3 ft (16.6 m)
- Draft: 24 ft 5/8 in (7.331 m) (mean)
- Depth: 27.2 ft (8.3 m)
- Installed power: 359 Nhp, 2,800 ihp
- Propulsion: Llewellyn Iron Works 3-cylinder triple expansion
- Speed: 10 1/2 knots (12.1 mph; 19.4 km/h)

West Niger was a steam cargo ship built in 1919–1920 by Southwestern Shipbuilding Company of San Pedro for the United States Shipping Board (USSB) as part of the wartime shipbuilding program of the Emergency Fleet Corporation (EFC) to restore the nation's Merchant Marine. The freighter spent her entire career in the Pacific connecting the West Coast of the United States with the Chinese and Japanese ports in the Far East. Early in 1928, the ship, together with ten other vessels, was sold by the Shipping Board to the States Steamship Co. and subsequently renamed Nevada. In September 1932, the vessel, while on her regular trip to Japan, ran aground in foggy weather on Amatignak Island and subsequently broke into three parts and sank with the loss of thirty four out of thirty seven men.

== Design and construction ==
After the United States entry into World War I, a large shipbuilding program was undertaken to restore and enhance shipping capabilities both of the United States and their Allies. As part of this program, EFC placed orders with nation's shipyards for a large number of vessels of standard designs. Most of these new vessels were known as the West ships as they were built by several shipyards on the West Coast of the United States and all were given names that began with the word West. Design 1019 cargo ship was among the designs adopted by USSB, and was a standard cargo freighter of approximately 8,800 deadweight tonnage designed by Theodore E. Ferris.

West Niger was the second ship of the second batch order placed by USSB with Southwestern Shipbuilding on 10 July 1918 and was laid down at the shipbuilder's yard on 17 April 1919 and launched on 28 September 1919 (yard number 12), with Mrs. H.C. Bedwell of Los Angeles being the sponsor. The ship had two main decks, four main holds and had also all the modern machinery fitted for quick loading and unloading of the cargo from five main hatches, including ten winches and a large number of derricks. The vessel had electric lights installed along the decks and was also equipped with wireless.

As built, the ship was 410.5 feet (125.1 m) long (between perpendiculars) and 54.3 feet (16.6 m) abeam, and had a depth of 27.2 feet (8.3 m). West Niger was originally assessed at 5,645 GRT and 3,517 NRT and had deadweight of approximately 8,542. The vessel had a steel hull, and a single 359 nhp triple-expansion steam engine, with cylinders of 24 1/2-inch (62 cm), 41 1/2-inch (105 cm) and 72-inch (180 cm) diameter with a 48-inch (120 cm) stroke, that drove a single screw propeller, and moved the ship at up to 10 1/2 knots (12.1 mph; 19.4 km/h). The steam for the engine was supplied by three Scotch marine boilers fitted for both coal and oil fuel.

After successfully completing her trial trip on January 26, West Niger left five days later for San Francisco.

== Operational history ==
In December 1919 as the vessel was nearing the end of construction West Niger was allocated to Pacific Mail Steamship Company to operate on California to the Far East route. Upon delivery West Niger departed Los Angeles on 31 January 1920 for San Francisco where after inspection the ship was officially accepted by USSB. After loading her cargo, the ship departed for her maiden voyage on 18 February 1920 bound for Chinese and Japanese ports via Honolulu. On March 16 while leaving Yokohama West Niger ran aground in the Yokohama Bay but was able to refloat herself at next high tide and continue on her journey. After visiting ports of China and Manila, the freighter returned to San Francisco on May 28 bringing back nearly 6,700 tons of cargo consisting of 2,024 tons of sugar, large quantities of tea, jute bags and other oriental merchandise. West Niger made two more trips to East Asia under Pacific Mail Steamship Co. management. During her third voyage she carried among other things 500,000 gallons of gasoline for the Philippines to help alleviate an ongoing fuel shortage crisis there. Upon return to San Francisco on 30 December 1920, West Niger together with many other vessels was laid up in Benicia due to overabundance of tonnage and lack of cargo.

In early January 1923 the ship was reactivated by USSB and put into Moore's Shipbuilding Co. drydock for reconditioning. On 9 March 1923 it was reported that the vessel was taken over by Columbia Pacific Shipping Company in San Francisco, and soon left for Portland to load cargo for delivery to Japan and China. The freighter was assigned to the Oregon Oriental Line and carried cargo between the ports of the Pacific Northwest and various ports in East Asia. On her westward journeys the ship transported mostly lumber and flour to the ports of Japan and North China, and on her return voyages she was loaded with oriental goods, such as hemp, copra, sugar and a variety of vegetable oils. After a year of service the freighter was briefly laid up on 20 March 1924 due to drop in cargo availability, but returned to the Northern China route in May of the same year. For example, in June 1925 the freighter carried over 4,500,000 feet of lumber from Oregon ports to the Far East destinations. In June 1925 USSB decided to have oil tanks of approximately 600-700 tons capacity installed on several vessels operated by Oregon Oriental Line to allow the ships carry large quantities of vegetable oils in bulk. West Niger entered the drydock at Portland at the end of September 1925 and returned to service in October after completion of installation.

During her career West Niger came to other ships rescue on several occasions. In July 1924 when another Columbia Pacific vessel West Jena lost her tail shaft and propeller she was taken in tow from Dutch Harbor to Astoria by West Niger safely bringing the disabled freighter to port on July 31.

In late May 1925 West Niger, while on a return trip from Dairen to San Francisco, picked up a wireless call for help from another Columbia Pacific ship, West Kader, who claimed to have water in her fuel tanks shutting down her engines. West Niger took the disabled vessel in tow and brought her to the mouth of Columbia River, where she was transferred to a local tug.

In early April 1926 West Niger came to aid of steamer Wheatland Montana of the Admiral Oriental Line who lost a propeller in a 60 mph (97 km/h) gale halfway between Seattle and Japan. West Niger started towing the disabled vessel but the line parted and after several attempts to get another line Wheatland Montana was finally taken into tow. After about two weeks of towing, approximately 700 miles from the Puget Sound, West Niger was relieved by another Admiral Oriental Line steamer, SS City of Spokane and was able to resume voyage to her destination.

On 5 July 1927, while on passage from Iloilo to Cebu, West Niger went ashore on Cap Island, about 80 miles south of Cebu. The freighter sustained little damage and was able to refloat herself and reached Cebu on July 7.

On 16 February 1928 it was announced that USSB got out of shipping business and disposed of its remaining three cargo lines in the Pacific. Oregon Oriental Line was one of these lines and was sold together with 11 ships it operated to a concern headed by Kenneth D. Dawson, owner of Columbia Pacific Shipping Co. for $1,065,000. As part of the transaction, West Niger was valued at $95,000. The acquired ships were to be operated by the newly formed States Steamship Co., and as part of the transfer were also renamed after states, with West Niger becoming Nevada. At the time of acquisition, West Niger was still on her way from Far East and did not reach Portland until June 12. After discharging her cargo, the freighter was put into dock for examination and repairs, following which she loaded cargo for her next trip and left for her first journey under new ownership in early July. The ship continued sailing on the same route between Portland and Japanese and Chinese ports through the end of her career.

=== Sinking ===
Nevada departed Astoria for her last journey on September 16, 1932, bound for Yokohama carrying full cargo of lumber, flour and general merchandise. The vessel was under command of captain T. W. Johansen and had a crew of 35 and additionally had one passenger on board. The trip was largely uneventful until September 27, when at approximately 20:00 in foggy weather the freighter suddenly ran aground at full speed on the eastern tip of Amatignak Island. Nevada sent S.O.S. signal which was picked up by Japanese steamer Oregon Maru located nearby, and American liner President Madison approximately 500 miles away from the site of the wreck. Both vessels turned around and rushed to the aid of the distressed freighter. In the meantime, the crew tried to launch lifeboats, but due to high surf and strong winds it was nearly impossible to do, as the waves kept crushing over the ship. One lifeboat was launched successfully, but it eventually capsized taking all but three men down with it. Some of the crew drowned when swept off the deck by heavy waves or thrown against the deckload of lumber, some jumped overboard and tried to swim towards the shore. The captain, the third mate and the radio operator remained on board the ship but when the help arrived they were nowhere to be found. The next day the weather turned for the worse, with a gale arriving which broke the ship in three pieces. Oregon Maru reached the wreck after a prolonged search around 21:00 on September 28. Their attempts to save the survivors were unsuccessful as due to fog, gale and heavy seas they were not able to reach the shore, losing one lifeboat in the process. President Madison arrived around noon the next day and after a four-hour struggle was able to launch a lifeboat that reached the island and took off three survivors and transferred them on board the liner. They were safely landed in Victoria on October 5. On October 2 the States Steamship Company's vessel SS Oregon which was dispatched in the aftermath of the disaster reached the wreck and after thorough investigation of the wreck and the island found no traces of other survivors. On October 4 the U.S. Coast Guard cutter Haida finally reached the area after being dispatched from Seward on September 30. After searching the area they also failed to locate any additional survivors.
