= USS Dane =

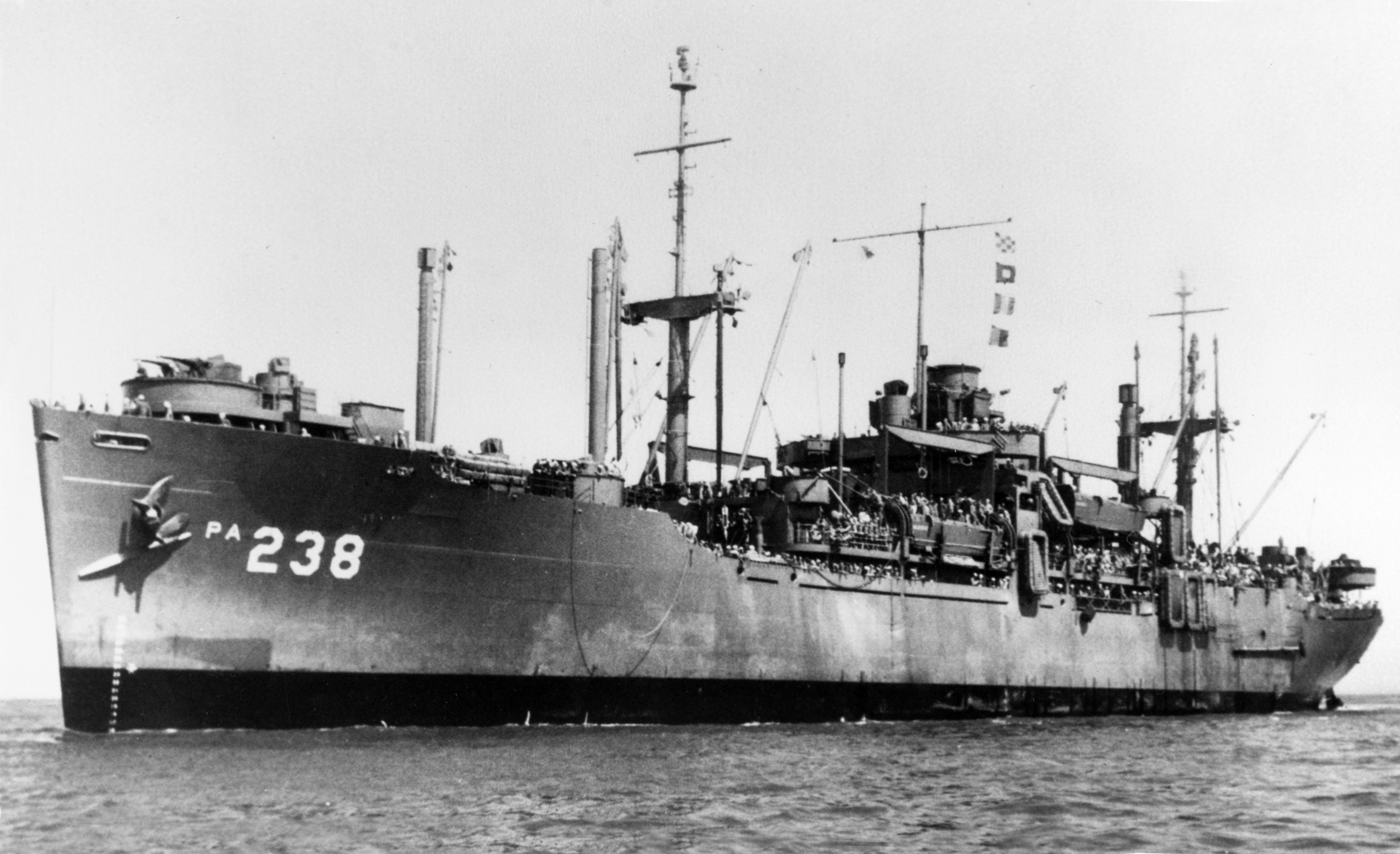

History

United States
- Name: USS Dane (APA-238)
- Namesake: Dane County, Wisconsin
- Builder: Oregon Shipbuilding
- Launched: 9 August 1945
- Sponsored by: Mrs D. A. Button
- Acquired: 29 October 1945
- Commissioned: 29 October 1945
- Decommissioned: 20 December 1946
- Stricken: 17 August 1958
- Fate: Scrapped 1975

General characteristics
- Class & type: Haskell-class attack transport
- Displacement: 6,720 tons (lt), 14,837 t. (fl)
- Length: 455 ft
- Beam: 62 ft
- Draft: 24 ft
- Propulsion: 1 x Joshua Hendy geared turbine, 2 x Babcock & Wilcox header-type boilers, 1 x propeller, designed shaft horsepower 8,500
- Speed: 17 knots
- Boats & landing craft carried: 2 x LCM, 12 x LCVP, 3 x LCPU
- Capacity: 86 Officers 1,475 Enlisted
- Crew: 56 Officers, 480 enlisted
- Armament: 1 x 5"/38 caliber dual-purpose gun mount, 1 x quad 40mm gun mount, 4 x twin 40mm gun mounts, 10 x single 20mm gun mounts
- Notes: MCV Hull No. ?, hull type VC2-S-AP5

USS Dane (APA-238) was a Haskell-class attack transport in service with the United States Navy from 1945 to 1946. She was scrapped in 1975.

== History ==
Dane was named after a county in Wisconsin. She was launched on 9 August 1945 by Oregon Shipbuilding of Portland, Oregon, under a Maritime Commission contract; transferred to the Navy 29 October 1945; and commissioned the same day.

Dane arrived too late to see action in World War II, but she arrived in time to participate in Operation Magic Carpet, the massive sealift made shortly after the war to bring returning servicemen home.

Dane made three "Magic Carpet" voyages to the West Pacific from 29 December 1945 to 10 July 1946, bringing home veterans from Okinawa, Guam, Peleliu, Manus, Truk, and Kwajalein.

=== Decommissioning ===
She remained at San Francisco until placed out of commission 20 December 1946. She was transferred to the Maritime Administration 17 August 1958, which disposed of her some time thereafter. Her final disposition is unknown.
