= SS West Montop =

History

United States
- Name: West Montop (1919-1930); San Rafael (1930-1948); Ting Hsing (1948-1951); An Ding (1951-1958)
- Owner: USSB (1920-March 1926); California & Eastern Steamship Company (March 1926- January 1929); Pacific-Atlantic Steamship Company (January 1929-1940); Wallem & Co (1940-1948); Chung Hsing Steamship Company
- Builder: Los Angeles Shipbuilding & Dry Dock Co
- Yard number: 18
- Laid down: October 18, 1918
- Launched: March 30, 1919
- Sponsored by: Mrs. E. E. Leighton
- Christened: West Montop
- Commissioned: December 31, 1919
- Home port: Los Angeles (1920-1929); Portland (1930-1940); Panama City (1940-1948); Shanghai (1948-1958)
- Identification: US official number 219443; Call sign LVFW (1920–33); Call sign KOTR (1934–40); Call sign HPQH (1940–48)
- Fate: Scrapped 1958

General characteristics
- Tonnage: 5,479 GRT; 3,423 NRT (1920-1931); deadweight 8,373
- Length: 410 ft 0 in (124.97 m)
- Beam: 54 ft 4 in (16.56 m)
- Depth: 27 ft 2 in (8.28 m)
- Installed power: 3500 Ihp, 422 Nhp
- Propulsion: Los Angeles Shipbuilding & Dry Dock Co 3-cylinder triple expansion
- Speed: 10.5 knots
- Crew: 40

West Montop was a Design 1013 cargo ship built in 1919 by the Los Angeles Shipbuilding & Dry Dock Co of Los Angeles. She was one of many ships built by the company for the United States Shipping Board.

== Design and construction ==
The West ships were cargo ships of similar size and design built by several shipyards on the West Coast of the United States for the United States Shipping Board (USSB) for emergency use during World War I. Most were given names that began with the word West. The ship was laid down at Los Angeles Shipbuilding & Dry Dock Co shipyard (yard number 18, USSB hull number 772), and launched on 30 March 1919. Mrs. E. E. Leighton, sister of Mayor Woodman, was the sponsor for the new vessel. As built, the ship was 410 feet 5 1/2 inches (125.108 m) long (between perpendiculars) and 54 feet 0 inches (16.46 m) abeam, a mean draft of 23 feet 11 1/4 inches (7.296 m). West Montop was assessed at 5,940 GRT, 3,729 NRT and 8,373 DWT. The vessel had a steel hull, and a single 422 nhp triple-expansion steam engine that drove a single screw propeller, and moved the ship at up to 10.5 knots (12.1 mph; 19.4 km/h).

== Operational history ==
West Montop was launched on March 30, 1919, and delivered to the United States Shipping Board in December, 1919. Upon delivery, the vessel was allocated to Los Angeles Pacific Navigation Company, who along with four other ships put it on her routes to the Orient. The voyages were profitable initially, for example a January 1920 trip by West Montop netted $108,703, while on May 28, 1920, the ship brought from Sumatra large cargo of rubber and other merchandise from the Orient that was even celebrated with a special lunch of local dignitaries on board the ship after her arrival, on June 3. She made one more trip leaving Los Angeles at the end of June and returning at the end of September.

However, by early 1921 it became clear that with the tariffs imposed by the Shipping Board, it was impossible for American merchants to compete with the foreign companies. West Montop and another vessel Vinita were sitting idle in Los Angeles Harbor for several months due to lack of cargo. West Montop was laid up in Los Angeles until she was allocated to Struther & Barry for Oriental Service in late 1923.

She made two trips to the Orient, arriving on February 14, 1924, in Singapore, leaving two days later and returning to Los Angeles on April 16, 1924, during her first journey. On her second trip she arrived in Singapore on June 26, 1924, and left July 1, arriving in Oakland at the end of August with a large cargo of copra loaded in Philippine Islands and Borneo. Another trip was planned for the Fall of 1924, but in September 1924 West Montop was re-allocated to a newly created California & Eastern Steamship Company. West Montop was primarily employed in lumber-carrying operations between US West Coast ports of Seattle, and Portland and eastern seaboard, for example in September 1927 she was hauling 3,000,000 feet of lumber to the East coast ports.

On March 1, 1926, it was announced West Montop was sold by the USSB to California & Eastern Steamship Company for $170,145.00 less $4,855.00 in uninsurable damage. In January 1929 California & Eastern Steamship Company dissolved and its assets were acquired by the Quaker Line a subsidiary of the Pacific-Atlantic Steamship Company. In September 1929 it was announced that several ships belonging to the Quaker Line were renamed, and West Montop became San Rafael.

Quaker Line reassigned San Rafael to the States Steamship Line to manage the West coast-East coast route. For the next 10 years, San Rafael was bringing general cargo from New York City and other East coast ports to Seattle and other ports on the West coast. On her return trip, she was carrying mostly lumber from Portland to Philadelphia.

Some time in 1940 San Rafael was sold to Wallem Group, a Hong Kong–based shipping company that was extensively buying older ships since 1938. They also set up a registered office in Panama City which allowed them to utilize Panamanian registry very popular with Chinese owners. Since 1940 the ship's history becomes murky. It was renamed to Ting Hsing and managed by Chung Hsing Steamship Company from 1948. In 1951 the ship was again renamed to An Ding. The vessel was finally scrapped in 1958.
