= SS West Mingo =

History

United States
- Name: West Mingo (1919-1930); San Clemente (1930-1942); Tobol (1943-1947)
- Owner: USSB (1920-March 1926); California & Eastern Steamship Company (March 1926- January 1929); Pacific-Atlantic Steamship Company (January 1929-December 1942); USSR Far East Shipping Corporation (December 1942-1947)
- Builder: Los Angeles Shipbuilding & Dry Dock Co
- Yard number: 17
- Laid down: September 26, 1918
- Launched: February 16, 1919
- Sponsored by: Mrs. Stoddard Jess
- Christened: West Mingo
- Commissioned: December 12, 1919
- Home port: Los Angeles (1920-1929); Portland (1930-1941); Tacoma (1942); Vladivostok (1942-1947)
- Identification: US official number 219320; Call sign LTWR (1920–33); Call sign KORB (1934–42)
- Fate: ran aground June 29, 1947; Sunk July 15, 1947

General characteristics
- Tonnage: 5,493 GRT; 3,428 NRT; deadweight 8,377
- Length: 410 ft 0 in (124.97 m)
- Beam: 54 ft 4 in (16.56 m)
- Depth: 27 ft 2 in (8.28 m)
- Installed power: 3500 Ihp, 422 Nhp
- Propulsion: Los Angeles Shipbuilding & Dry Dock Co 3-cylinder triple expansion
- Speed: 10.5 knots
- Crew: 40

West Mingo was a Design 1013 cargo ship built in 1919 by the Los Angeles Shipbuilding & Dry Dock Co of Los Angeles. She was one of many ships built by the company for the United States Shipping Board.

== Design and construction ==
The West ships were cargo ships of similar size and design built by several shipyards on the West Coast of the United States for the United States Shipping Board (USSB) for emergency use during World War I. Most were given names that began with the word West. The ship was laid down at Los Angeles Shipbuilding & Dry Dock Co shipyard (yard number 17, USSB hull number 771), and launched on 16 February 1919 with approximately 500 people watching. Mrs. Stoddard Jess, wife of the president of the First National Bank christened the vessel. As built, the ship was 410 feet 5 1/2 inches (125.108 m) long (between perpendiculars) and 54 feet 0 inches (16.46 m) abeam, a mean draft of 23 feet 11 1/4 inches (7.296 m). West Mingo was assessed at 5,940 GRT, 3,729 NRT and 8,377 DWT. The vessel had a steel hull, and a single 422 nhp triple-expansion steam engine that drove a single screw propeller, and moved the ship at up to 10.5 knots (12.1 mph; 19.4 km/h).

== Operational history ==
West Mingo was launched on February 16, 1919, and delivered to the United States Shipping Board on November 30, 1919. Upon delivery, the vessel was first allocated to Los Angeles Pacific Navigation Company in December 1919. She loaded cargo and departed Los Angeles harbor with a cargo of cotton and other south California products on December 16, 1919, for the Orient. However, she sustained problems with her boilers and engine soon after leaving and had to stop in San Francisco for repairs to her hull, boilers and engines., eventually leaving San Francisco on January 6, 1920. On her voyage she touched at Kobe, Yokohama, Shanghai, Manila and Honolulu before returning to San Francisco on May 10, 1920. She brought back 610 tons of peanut oil from Manila, and 82,000 bags of sugar from Hawaii among other cargo.

During this time West Mingo was re-allocated to Pacific Mail Steamship Company who immediately put her on the round-the world voyage. On June 12, 1920, she left San Francisco for Manila via Japan, and arrived in Honolulu with a broken propeller stub on June 22, 1920. The repairs were done very quickly, and the ship was on her way next day. West Mingo reached Japan in July, was berthed in Singapore in September,. From there she proceeded to Marseilles, arriving there on December 21, 1920, then to Barcelona, Valencia, and then went on to the US East coast. On February 24, 1921 West Mingo touched at Baltimore, two days later in Norfolk from where she proceeded to the Panama Canal and onto San Francisco.

However, by early 1921 it became clear that with the tariffs imposed by the Shipping Board, it was impossible for American merchants to compete with the foreign companies. In early April 1921 several ships including West Mingo were returned to the USSB. The vessel was towed and laid up in Benicia where she would stay for the next few years.

In November 1926 West Mingo was sold by the USSB to California & Eastern Steamship Company for $50,000.00. Since the ship was laid up for five years, it required significant repairs which were performed in January 1927 for approximately $70,000.00 at The Moore Dry Dock Company. On September 28, 1927, she loaded 250 tonnes worth of airplanes for the US Army units based in the Hawaiian Islands. In January 1929 California & Eastern Steamship Company dissolved and its assets were acquired by the Quaker Line a subsidiary of the Pacific-Atlantic Steamship Company. In September 1929 it was announced that several ships belonging to the Quaker Line were renamed, and West Mingo became San Clemente.

Quaker Line reassigned San Clemente to the States Steamship Line to manage the West coast-East coast route. For the next 10 years, San Clemente was bringing general cargo from New York City and other East coast ports to Tacoma and other ports on the West coast. On her return trip, she was carrying mostly lumber from Portland to Philadelphia.

In 1942 San Clemente was sold to the US Maritime Commission. On December 16, 1942 San Clemente was transferred under Lend Lease agreement to the USSR, and subsequently was renamed Tobol. In Soviet service she was moving supplies and military equipment from the West coast of the US to Vladivostok. In 1945 she carried several Soviet naval crews to be trained at Cold Bay on the US YMC-class minesweepers which were being transferred to the Soviet Navy under Lend Lease agreement.

On June 29, 1947, while assisting a Philippine-flagged cargo ship Dona Trinidad who ran aground on Nijo-Gan rock between Hokkaido and Sakhalin in the La Pérouse Strait, she got holed by the rocks and abandoned. Attempts to refloat her failed, and on July 15, 1947, she broke in two and sank.
