= SS Davidson Victory =

Victory ship of the United States

- SS Davidson Victory on ways

History

United States
- Name: SS Davidson Victory
- Namesake: Davidson College
- Owner: War Shipping Administration
- Operator: Pacific-Atlantic Steamship Company
- Builder: Oregon Shipbuilding Company; Portland, Oregon, U.S.
- Laid down: 16 January 1945
- Launched: 27 February 1945
- Acquired: 30 March 1945
- Fate: Scrapped 1968

General characteristics
- Class & type: VC2-S-AP3
- Displacement: 12,450 tons
- Length: 455 ft (139 m)
- Beam: 62 ft (19 m)
- Draft: 24 ft (7.3 m)

The SS Davidson Victory (172) was launched by the Oregon Shipbuilding Corporation in Portland, Oregon, United States, on 27 February 1945. The ship's United States Maritime Commission designation was VC2-S-AP3, Hull Number 172. One of a series of Victory ships named after institutes of higher education, the Davidson Victory was named after North Carolina's Davidson College, from which more than 200 books along with "charts, etchings and pictorial publications, of the college" were given to the ship's library.

She sailed unescorted from the San Francisco Bay area in spring 1945 with a cargo of naval munitions bound for Ulithi Atoll in the Western Caroline Islands, operated by the Pacific-Atlantic Steamship Company. There she served as one of many floating ammunition depots for what was at the time the world's largest naval base. Like other "ammo" ships, the Davidson Victory was stationed at a safe distance from the anchored fleet due to her volatile cargo. She left Ulithi in the summer of 1945 en route to the Philippines to prepare for the invasion of the Japanese home islands when the Japanese surrender was announced. After the surrender the ship was directed back to the Bay Area to unload its remaining cargo and discharge its United States Navy Armed Guard and cargo crew. Due largely to its late entry into the war, the Davidson "never heard a shot fired in anger." Nevertheless, she and her sister ships served a vital role in the war effort.

The Davidson Victory continued to transport foodstuffs and other cargo to Japan under the direction of the US War Shipping Administration until 1948, when it was leased to the Pacific-Atlantic Steamship Company of Tacoma, Washington and renamed the SS Montana. Ownership of the Montana was transferred to the States Steamship Company in 1955, and the ship was acquired by US Department of Commerce in 1961. The Montana as scrapped in Portland, Oregon in 1968.
