= SS Iowa (1920) =

U.S. steamship

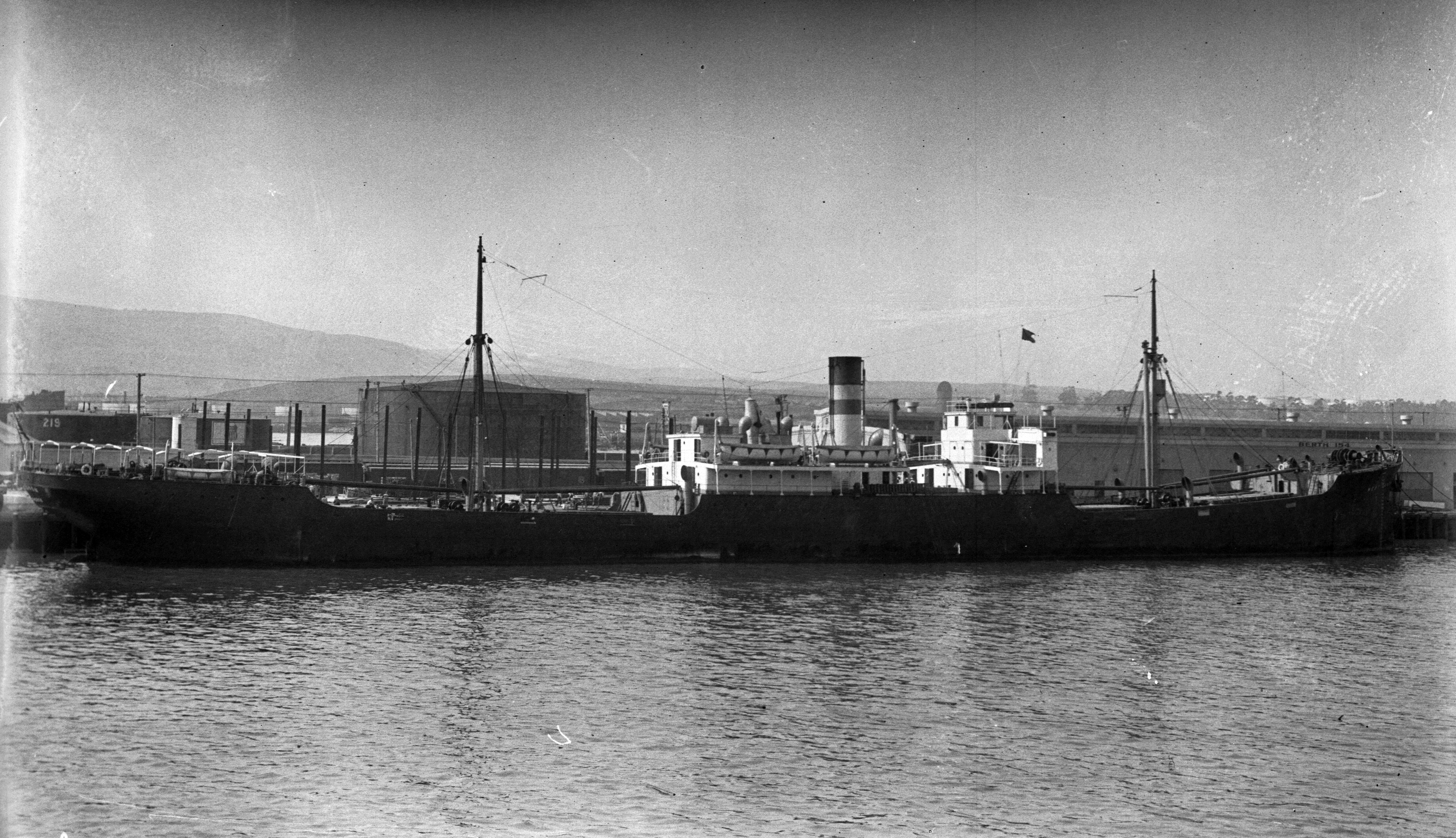
- SS West Cadron, 1920s

History

- Name: SS Iowa (1928-1936) SS West Cadron (1920-1928)
- Operator: U.S. government (1920-1928); Quaker Line (1928-1936)
- Builder: Western Pipe & Steel Co.
- Yard number: 12
- Completed: 1920
- Fate: Ran aground January 12, 1936

General characteristics
- Tonnage: 5,724 (gross)
- Length: 410 ft (120 m)
- Beam: 54 ft (16 m)
- Installed power: 359 nhp
- Propulsion: triple-expansion engine
- Speed: 10.5 knots

SS Iowa was a steamship built by the Western Pipe and Steel Company of San Francisco, California in 1920 for the U.S. government and was known as the SS West Cadron. It served in the Quaker Line subsidiary of the States Steamship Company. from 1928—when it was renamed the Iowa—until January 12, 1936, when it ran aground on Peacock Spit, Washington, part of the Columbia Bar at the mouth of the Columbia River.

SS Iowa was travelling from Longview, Washington where it had taken on a load of lumber. The ship was carrying more than 6,900 long tons of cargo. Around midnight, as SS Iowa was crossing the Columbia River bar, a gale estimated at 75 mph hit the ship. Captain Edgar Yates was experienced crossing the bar and had not brought a bar pilot aboard. At the Cape Disappointment Lighthouse around 2 a.m., a Coast Guard observer witnessed the ship start to turn south and then turn to the north toward Peacock Spit where water depths are only around 20 feet (6.1 m). The Astoria Coast Guard station received the Iowa distress call around 4:30 a.m.

The Coast Guard cutter Onondaga was dispatched after the SOS was received. Attempts were made to communicate with the ship by observers at the lighthouse using radio, light signals, and flags. The observers saw a flash of light from the ship and a few flags raised in response, but were unable to decipher any messages from the ship in the stormy conditions. By the time that the Onondaga arrived, only masts were visible above the waves. All 34 people aboard the ship died, and only six bodies were recovered from the wreckage that dotted local shorelines for days.
