= States Steamship Company =

Passengers and Shipping Company

States Steamship Company Pacific-Atlantic Steamship Company
- House flag
- Industry: Shipping; Transportation; Passengers (1928-1937)
- Founded: 1941
- Founder: Charles Dant
- Defunct: 1979
- Fate: Bankruptcy 1979
- Headquarters: Portland, Oregon - San Francisco
- Key people: Mr. Russell

States Steamship Company, also called States Line and SSS, was started in 1928 by Charles Dant, in Portland, Oregon and later moved to the headquarters to San Francisco. Dant started the States Steamship Company to take his lumber product to market. He had a fleet of lumber schooners. Dant started by leasing ships from the United States Shipping Board - Emergency Fleet Corporation and founded the Columbia Pacific Steamship Company in 1919, Columbia Pacific Steamship Company routes were between Portland, Far East and Europe. In 1928 Dant merged the Columbia Pacific Steamship Company into the States Steamship Company. The Europe route ended in 1932 and the ship moved to a Philippines route. With the shift to container shipping in the 1960s and Dant's fleet of ships becoming older and obsolete, the company into bankruptcy in 1979. States Line operated four subsidies: Pacific-Atlantic Steamship Company, California Eastern Line founded in 1937 for lumber shipping, Oregon Oriental Line and the Quaker Line.

Charles Dant was a major stock holder in the China Import and Export Lumber Company, which had a large sawmill plant in Shanghai.

The Pacific-Atlantic Steamship Company was active with charter shipping with the Maritime Commission and War Shipping Administration for World War II. Pacific-Atlantic Steamship Company also operated charter shipping for the Korea War and Vietnam War.

== States Steamship Company flag ==
In 1928 Charles Dant pick the swastika (at that time symbol of good luck until the 1930s) for this ship's flags. The red flag had a black upright swastika on it. After Adolf Hitler picked the swastika for the Nazi Party flag in 1937, Dant was forced to change his flag to avoid associations with a state hostile to the United States. The first flag was blue and white with a red vertical stripe at the pole and was used until the 1950s. The swastikas painted on the funnels have been replaced by a white sun cross on a blue background. In the 1950s, the logo and flag was changed to a red seahorse between the waves. New logo was ordered in Walter Landor Associate and served until the end of the company's existence.

1928-1940s

1940s-1950s and longer in subsidiaries

1940s-1950s and longer in subsidiaries (variant)

1950s-1979

1950s-1979 (variant)

== States Steamship Company ships ==
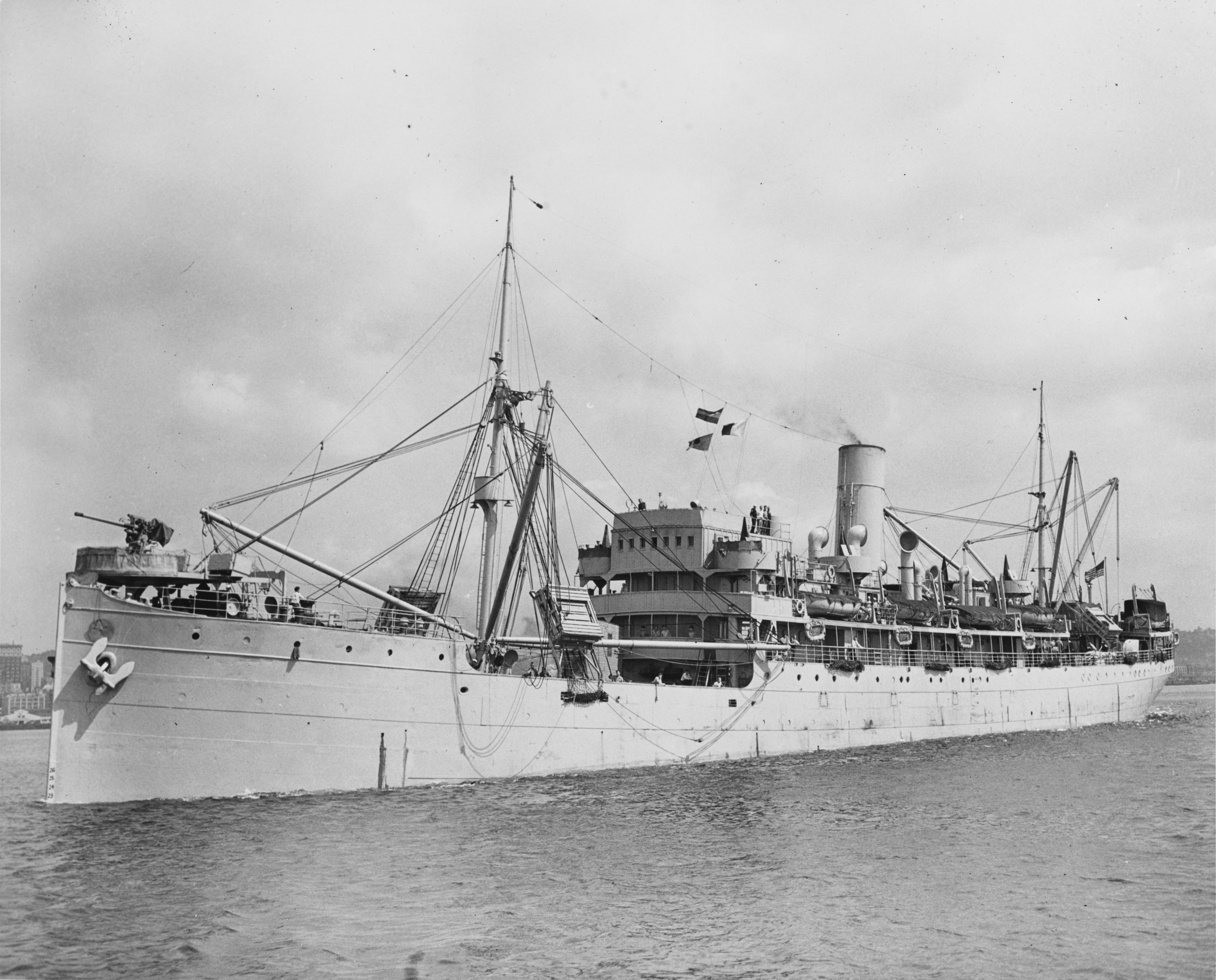
SS Otsego chartered to the States Steamship Company in 1941

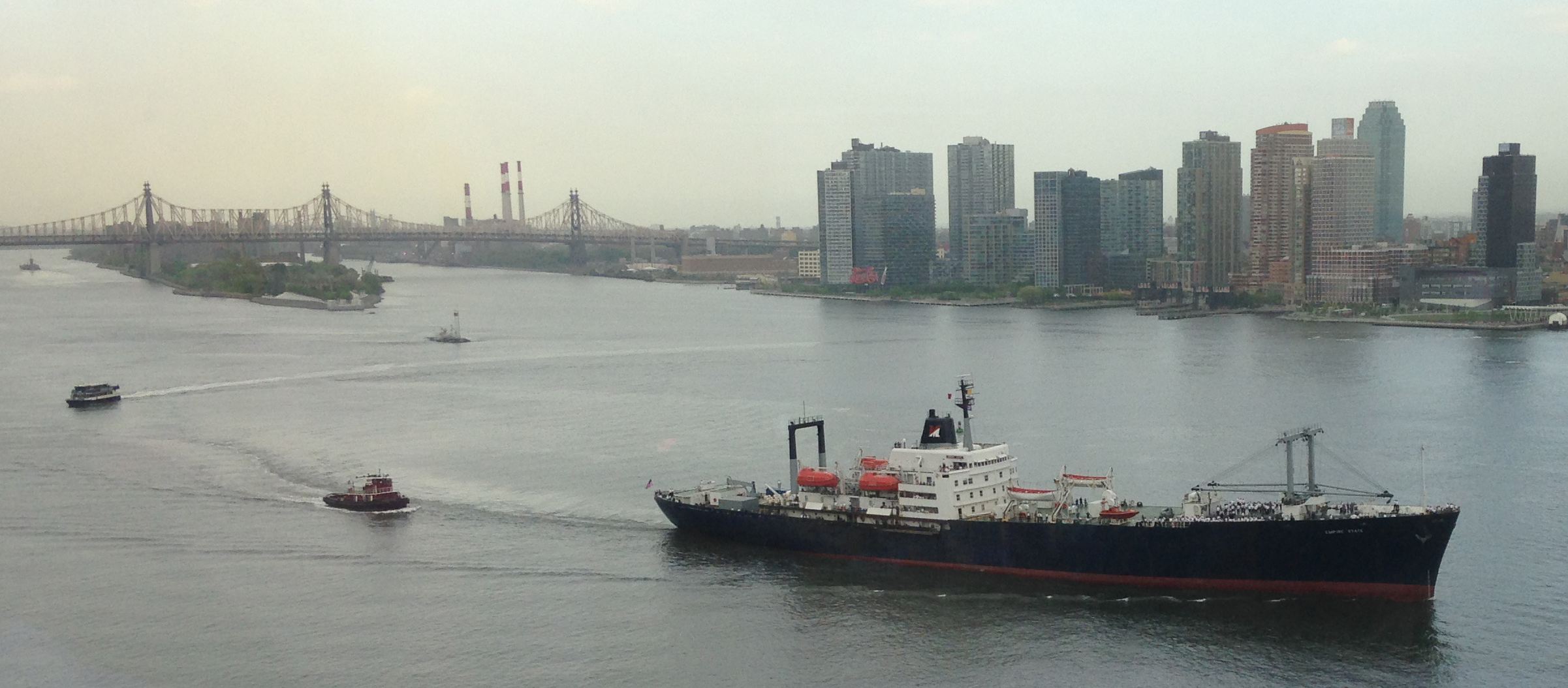
Empire State VI was built for the States Steamship Company in 1961

States Steamship Company ports: San Francisco, Portland, Yokohama, Kobe, Shanghai, Hong Kong, Manila Taiwan, Saigon, Bangkok, Okinawa .

- SS General Lee, passenger from United Fruit in 1932
- SS General Pershing, passenger from United Fruit in 1932
- SS General Sherman, passenger from United Fruit in 1932
- SS Hakozaki Maru
- SS Terukuni Maru
- SS Haruna Maru
- SS Katori Maru
- SS Yasukuni Maru
- SS Hakone Maru
- SS Fushimi Maru
- SS Kaisar-I-Hind
- SS Chitral
- SS Ranpura
- SS Corfu
- SS Ranchi
- SS Naldera
- SS Carthage
- SS San Clemente
- SS San Rafael
- SS Flomar (1919)
- SS President Monroe
- SS President Van Buren
- SS President Polk
- SS President Adams
- SS President Hayes
- SS President Wilson
- SS President Garfield
- SS Gneisenau
- SS Potsdam
- SS Scharnhorst
- SS Ramses
- SS Christiaan Huygens
- SS Johan van Oldenbarnevelt
- SS Johan de Witt
- SS Marnix van St. Aldegonde
- SS Colorado
- SS Montana
- SS Idaho
- SS Nevada, sank
- SS Wyoming
- SS Michigan, sank off Philippines in storm.
- SS California (1961)
- Empire State VI
- SS Hawaii
- SS M.M. Dant
- SS Arizona
- SS Pennsylvania (1944)
- SS Illinois, June 1, 1942 torpedoed
- SS Oregon, Feb. 28, 1942 shelled by submarine
- SS "Ohio", Unknown
- SS C.E. Dant
- SS Washington (1941)
- SS San Angela
- San Felipe (1919)

== Quaker Line and California Eastern Line ==
Quaker Line and California Eastern ships:

- San Simeon
- SS San Marcos
- SS San Diego
- SS San Lucas
- SS San Vincente
- SS San Rafael
- SS San Anselmo
- SS San Domingo
- SS San Gabriel
- SS San Clemente
- SS San Felipe
- SS San Bernardino
- SS California, torpedoed on Aug. 13, 1942
- SS Illinois
- SS Iowa (1920), sank, all crew lost.
- SS Kentucky, torpedoed on Sept. 18, 1942
- SS Laruel, sank in 1929 on Columbia River with load with lumber.

== Pacific-Atlantic Steamship Company ==
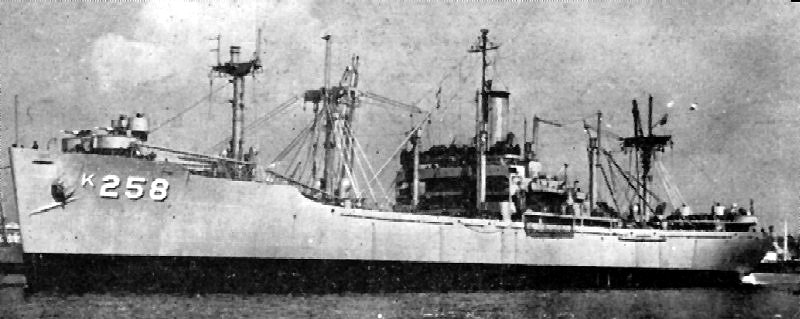
SS Nampa Victory

Pacific-Atlantic Steamship Co. operated many Liberty ships for World War II

Pacific-Atlantic Steamship Company Chartered ships:

=== Victory ships ===
- Alma Victory
- Billings Victory
- SS Boise Victory
- SS Davidson Victory
- SS Drew Victory
- SS Lewiston Victory
- SS Middlesex Victory
- SS Paducah Victory
- SS Wellesley Victory
- SS Saginaw Victory
- SS Iran Victory
- SS Colgate Victory
- SS Nampa Victory

=== Liberty ships ===
- SS Alan Seeger
- SS Jose Pedro Varela
- SS Felix Riesenberg
- SS Allen C. Balch
- SS Robert G. Harper
- SS Felix Riesenberg (also to States Line)
- SS William Allen White
- SS William Sproule
- SS J. D. Ross
- SS Star of Oregon, Torpedoed and sunk by U-162 off Trinidad
- SS Jack London
- SS James Devereaux
- SS Nathaniel Hawthorne, was torpedoed on Nov. 7, 1942
- SS Henry Adams
- SS Lucien La Baudt
- SS Henry Bacon, Torpedoed and sunk by aircraft in Barents Sea
- SS Peter Kerr, bombed on July 5, 1942
- SS Elias Howe, bombed on Sept. 24, 1943
- SS John Sevier, torpedoed on April 6, 1943
- SS Francisco Coronado

=== Tanker ===
- SS Mission Solano

=== Type C1 ship ===
- SS Rose Knot (post war)

== See also ==
- World War II United States Merchant Navy
- Oregon Shipbuilding Corporation
