= USS Drew =

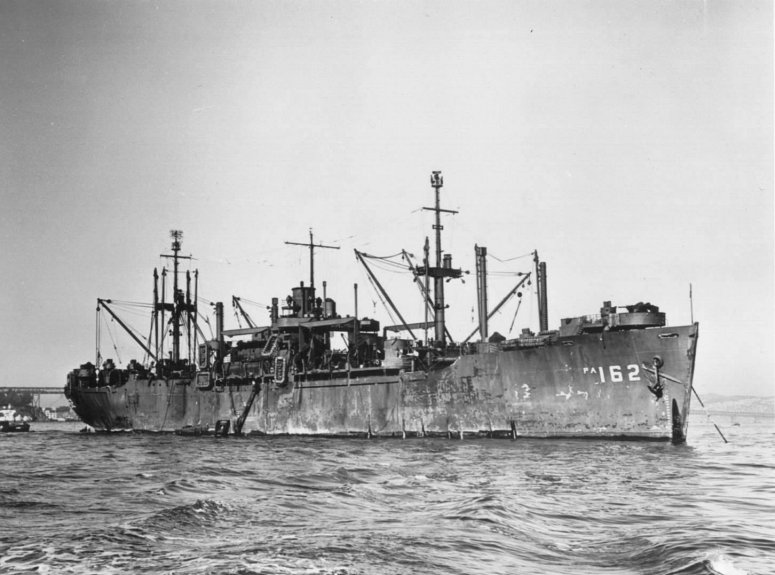

History

United States
- Name: USS Drew
- Namesake: Drew County, Arkansas
- Ordered: as type VC2-S-AP5
- Laid down: 30 June 1944
- Launched: 14 September 1944
- Commissioned: 22 October 1944
- Decommissioned: 10 May 1946
- Stricken: date unknown
- Fate: Sold for scrapping, 1974

General characteristics
- Displacement: 12,450 tons (full load)
- Length: 455 ft 0 in (138.68 m)
- Beam: 62 ft 0 in (18.90 m)
- Draught: 24 ft 0 in (7.32 m)
- Speed: 19 knots
- Complement: 536
- Armament: one 5 in (130 mm) gun mount, twelve 40 mm gun mounts, ten 20 mm gun mounts

USS Drew (APA-162) was a Haskell-class attack transport in service with the United States Navy from 1944 to 1946. She was scrapped in 1974.

== History ==
Drew (APA-162) was launched 14 September 1944 by Oregon Shipbuilding Corp., Portland, Oregon, under a Maritime Commission contract; sponsored by Mrs. G. De Garmo; and commissioned 22 October 1944.

=== World War II ===
Drew sailed from San Pedro, California, 10 December 1944 with passengers for Seattle, Washington, where she loaded cargo, departing on the 18th for Honolulu. She sailed from Pearl Harbor 8 January 1945 to deliver cargo to Guam and Ulithi during her passage to Leyte where she arrived 10 February. After training and rehearsal landings, she sailed 21 March for the invasion of Okinawa, and on 26 March began landing her troops on Kerama Retto and other small islands off Okinawa.

Drew landed assault troops 16 April 1945, returning to Okinawa the next day with casualties aboard. She carried out demonstration landings on Okinawa 19 April, then returned to Ie Shima the following day with reinforcements, carrying casualties back to Okinawa. On 26 April Drew sailed for Ulithi and a brief overhaul.

Returning to San Francisco 14 June 1945 Drew carried soldiers from the U.S. West Coast to Manus and after the end of the war, made two voyages to Japan, carrying occupation troops out, and returning veterans to the United States until her arrival at Tacoma, Washington, 16 December 1945.

=== Decommissioning and fate ===
Drew was placed out of commission 10 May 1946 and transferred to the Maritime Commission for disposal 19 May 1946. She was sold for scrapping to Consolidated Steel Corp. Brownsville, Texas (USA), on 23 January 1974.

== Awards ==
Drew received one battle star for World War II service at Okinawa.
