= Wheatland, Montana =

- Census-designated place
- Location within Montana
- Coordinates: 45°54′12″N 111°36′0″W
- Country: United States
- State: Montana
- County: Broadwater

Area
  - Total: 74.80 sq mi (193.72 km^{2})
  - Land: 74.45 sq mi (192.83 km^{2})
  - Water: 0.34 sq mi (0.89 km^{2})
- Elevation: 4,341 ft (1,323 m)

Population (2020)
  - Total: 1,103
  - Density: 14.8/sq mi (5.72/km^{2})
- Time zone: UTC-7 (Mountain (MST))
  - Summer (DST): UTC-6 (MDT)
- Area code: 406
- FIPS code: 30-79695
- GNIS feature ID: 2583865

Wheatland is a census-designated place (CDP) in Broadwater County, Montana, United States. As of the 2020 census, Wheatland had a population of 1,103.

== Geography ==
Wheatland occupies a large area in the southern end of Broadwater County. U.S. Route 287 runs north-south through the CDP, intersecting Interstate 90 at Exit 274 of that highway. Montana Highway 2 leads east across the Jefferson River to the city of Three Forks in Gallatin County.

According to the United States Census Bureau, the Wheatland CDP has a total area of 76.2 square miles (197.3 km^{2}), of which 75.6 square miles (195.9 km^{2}) is land and 0.58 square miles (1.5 km^{2}), or 0.74%, is water.

== Demographics ==
Historical population
Census	Pop.	Note	%±
2020	1,103		—
U.S. Decennial Census

== Education ==
Most of Wheatland CDP is within the Three Forks Elementary School District and the Three Forks High School District. The elementary and high school district are both a part of Three Forks Public Schools. With their motto currently standing as "We've got pep!" The northern portion of Wheatland CDP is within the Townsend K-12 Schools school district.
