= Oregon Shipbuilding Corporation =

World War II shipyard in Portland, Oregon, U.S.

Coordinates: 45°36′29″N 122°46′48″W

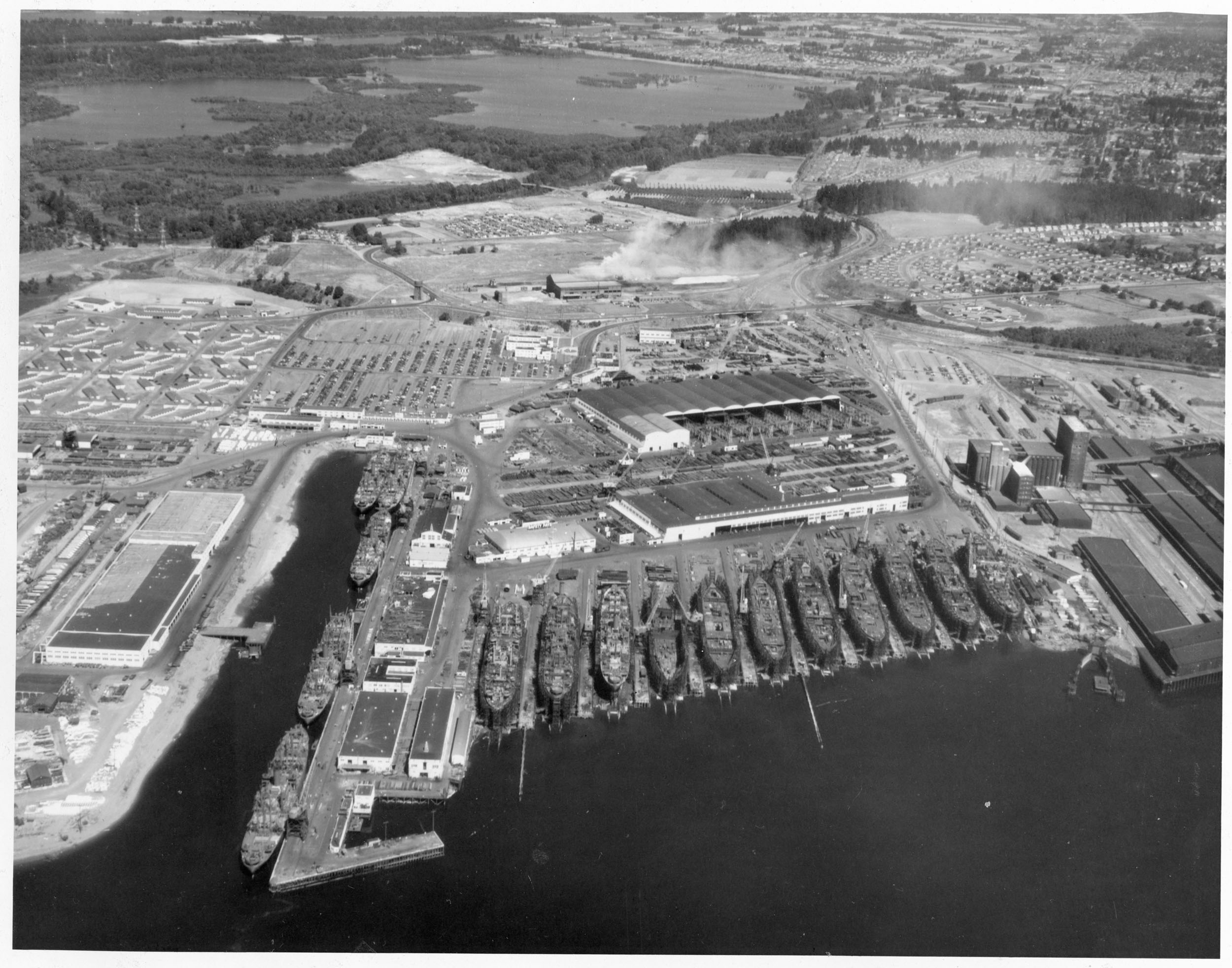
- The shipyard in 1945
- Industry: Maritime ship production
- Founded: 1941; 85 years ago
- Defunct: 1945
- Headquarters: Portland, Oregon, U.S.
- Products: Liberty and Victory ships

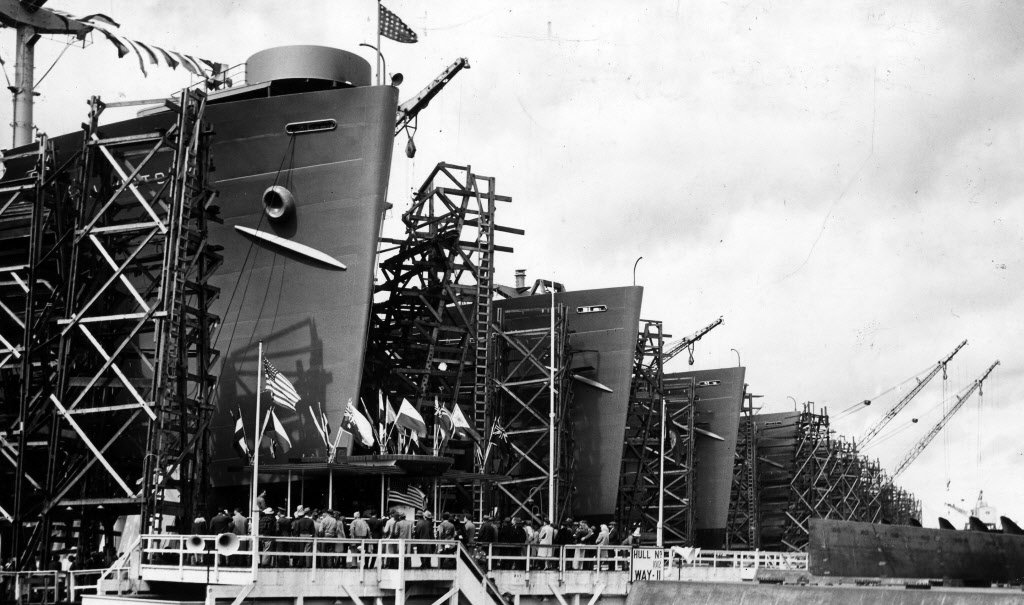
Victory ships under construction at the Oregon Shipbuilding Corporation in 1944

Oregon Shipbuilding Corporation was a World War II emergency shipyard located along the Willamette River in Portland, Oregon, United States. The shipyard built nearly 600 Liberty and Victory ships between 1941 and 1945 under the Emergency Shipbuilding program. It was closed after the war ended.

The shipyard, one of three Kaiser Shipyards in the area, was in the St. Johns neighborhood of North Portland. The two others were the Swan Island Shipyard, located several miles upriver on Swan Island; and the Vancouver Shipyard, located across the Columbia River from Portland in Vancouver, Washington.

Among the ships built by Oregon Shipbuilding was the Star of Oregon, which was launched on Liberty Fleet Day, September 27, 1941.

The rapid expansion of Portland area shipyards during World War II and contraction afterward caused similar expansion and contraction of the population of Vanport City, Oregon, which was also built by Henry J. Kaiser to house the workers of the three area shipyards.

The former site of Oregon Shipbuilding in St. Johns is now Radius Recycling (formerly Schnitzer Steel Industries).
