= Greenville Victory-class cargo ship =

Class of US Navy cargo ship

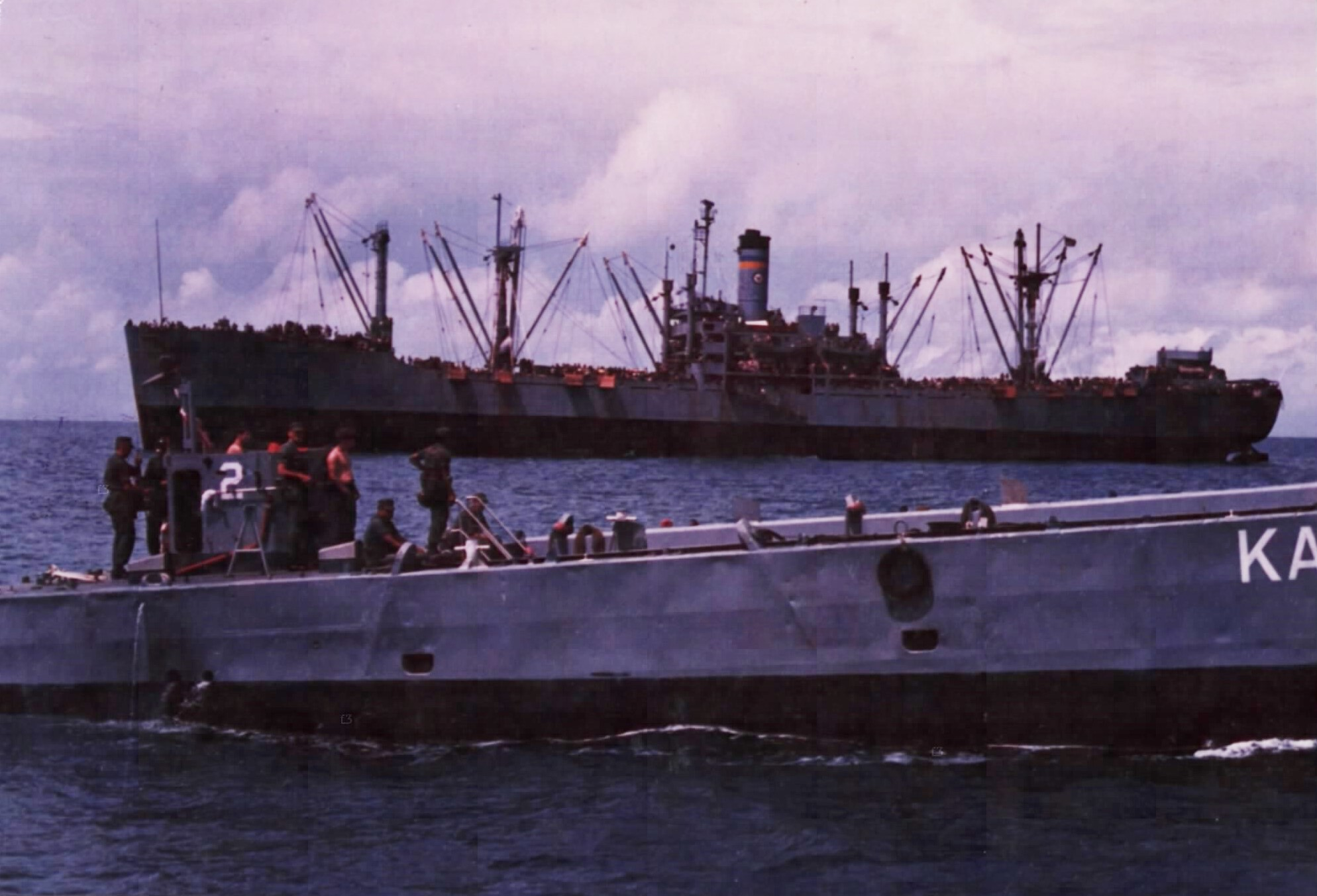
- Greeneville Victory during the evacuation of Phan Rang, 4 April 1975

Class overview
- Name: Greenville Victory class
- Builders: California Shipbuilding; Bethlehem Shipbuilding Corporation; Permanente Metals
- Preceded by: Boulder Victory class & Liberty ships
- Succeeded by: Comet class
- Built: 1944–1945
- In commission: 1948–1970
- Completed: 9
- Retired: 9

General characteristics "Cargo Ship Photo Index". NavSource.
- Class & type: Greenville Victory class
- Tonnage: 7,607 GRT
- Displacement: 4,480 long tons (4,550 t) (standard); 15,580 long tons (15,830 t) (full load)
- Length: 455 ft (139 m)
- Beam: 62 ft (19 m)
- Draft: 29 ft 2 in (8.89 m)
- Installed power: 2 × Babcock & Wilcox header-type boilers, 525psi 750°; 6,000 shp (4,500 kW)
- Propulsion: 1 × Westinghouse turbine; double Westinghouse Main Reduction Gears; 1 × shaft
- Speed: 15.5 kn (17.8 mph; 28.7 km/h)
- Capacity: 7,800 t (7,700 long tons) DWT; 453,210 cu ft (12,833 m^{3}) (non-refrigerated)
- Complement: 99 to 145 officers and enlisted
- Armament: 1 × 5 in (127 mm)/38-caliber dual-purpose gun; 1 × 3 in (76 mm)/50-caliber dual-purpose gun; 8 × 20 mm (0.8 in) Oerlikon cannons anti-aircraft (AA) mounts

The Greenville Victory-class cargo ship was a cargo ship design used for shipping during the Korean War by the United States Navy. Greenville Victory-class cargo ships were built for use during World War II. The Greenville Victory-class ships are the same as the Victory ships built of the World War II United States Merchant Navy. A total of nine Greenville Victory-class ships were built in 1944 and 1945. The ships were built under the Emergency Shipbuilding program for the War Shipping Administration for World War II. Some of the Greenville Victory class were launched as merchant ship Victory ships and then acquired by the United States Navy for the Korean War effort. The lead ship of the class, Greenville Victory was commissioned on 30 March 1948. The Greenville Victory build was complete on 7 July 1944, she took part in Battle of Okinawa from 27 May to 19 June 1945 as a merchant ship. Some of the Greenville Victory class also saw service in the Vietnam War, 21 years after construction. Some of the vessels were acquired by the United States Army and used in the U.S. Army Transportation Service.

== Ships in class ==
A total of nine Greenville Victory-class cargo ships were built and commissioned:

- USS Altair (AK-257), built as SS Aberdeen Victory, scrapped in 1975 after US Navy service and merchant ship service and general stores issue ship service.
- USNS Private John R. Towle (T-AK-240), built as SS Appleton Victory, scrapped in 1982 after U.S. Army Transportation Service, US Navy service and merchant ship service.
- USS Betelgeuse (AK-260), built as SS Colombia Victory, scrapped in 1976 after merchant ship service and Military Sea Transportation Service.
- USNS Dalton Victory (T-AK-256) / Sunnyvale, scrapped in 1975 after U.S. Army Transportation Service, US Navy service and merchant ship service.
- USNS Greenville Victory (T-AK-237) scrapped in 1983 after U.S. Army Transportation Service, Military Sea Transportation Service and merchant ship service.
- USNS Haiti Victory (T-AK-238) / Longview, scrapped in 1976 after merchant ship service, U.S. Army Transportation Service, and Military Sea Transportation Service.<
- USNS Kingsport Victory (T-AK-239) / Kingsport, scrapped in 1992 after merchant ship service, U.S. Army Transportation Service, Military Sea Transportation Service and miscellaneous auxiliary ship service.
- USS Antares (AK-258), built as Nampa Victory, scrapped in 1992 after merchant ship service, US Navy cargo and stores issue ship.
- USS Alcor (AK-259), built as Rockland Victory, scrapped in 1970 after merchant ship service, US Navy cargo ship service.

== Design ==
Victory ships replace the numerous built Liberty ships. Victory ship/Greenville Victory-class cargo ships were as fast as and better built than the Liberty ship, with a top speed of 15–17 knots (28–31 km/h; 17–20 mph). Liberty ships had a top speed of only 11–11.5 knots (20.4–21.3 km/h; 12.7–13.2 mph). Victory ships had more powerful steam turbine engines compared to the Liberty ship's triple-expansion steam engine. Victory ships were also slightly larger than the Liberty ships. Both Liberty ships and Greenville Victory-class ships had large hatches on the holds, and kingpost with large capacity boom cranes. This allowed the ships to unload and load without a dock crane. Most of the Greenville Victory-class cargo ships were upgraded to have a helicopter deck added to the stern deck in place of the original dual-purpose gun. Some ships had a twin hangar on the read deck to protect the embarked helicopters from bad weather. Advanced radar was also added. The 50-caliber dual-purpose guns were replace by four or eight 40 mm (1.6 in) Bofors anti-aircraft (AA) guns.

- The USNS Provo was later changed to be a Phoenix-class auxiliary ship in 1960.
- The USNS Dalton Victory and USNS Haiti Victory (T-AK-238) were later upgraded to Longview-class missile range instrumentation ships in 1960.
- The USNS Kingsport Victory (T-AK-239) was upgraded to a Kingsport-class telemetry ship in a 1961 conversion.
- While no Greenville Victory-class cargo ship survived being scrapped, three Victory ships became museum ships: SS American Victory, SS Lane Victory and the SS Red Oak Victory.

== Builders ==
- Two were built by Permanente Metals at Richmond Shipyards in Richmond, California.
- Four were built by Oregon Shipbuilding Corporation in Portland, Oregon
- Three were built by California Shipbuilding at Terminal Island in Los Angeles, California.
- Other shipyards built merchant Victory ships.

== Crew ==
Greenville Victory-class cargo ships were crewed by 99 to 145 officers and enlisted. This included: captain, executive officer (XO), radioman, signalman, radar operator, navigation officer, engineering officer, deckhands, chefs, and stewards, boatswain's mate, and quartermasters, gunners and fire controlman for the one stern 5 in (127 mm)/38-caliber dual-purpose gun; the one bow 3 in (76 mm)/50-caliber dual-purpose gun and the eight 20 mm (0.8 in) Oerlikon AA guns.

== Gallery ==
USNS Red Oak Victory built as SS Red Oak Victory now a museum ship at Richmond, California

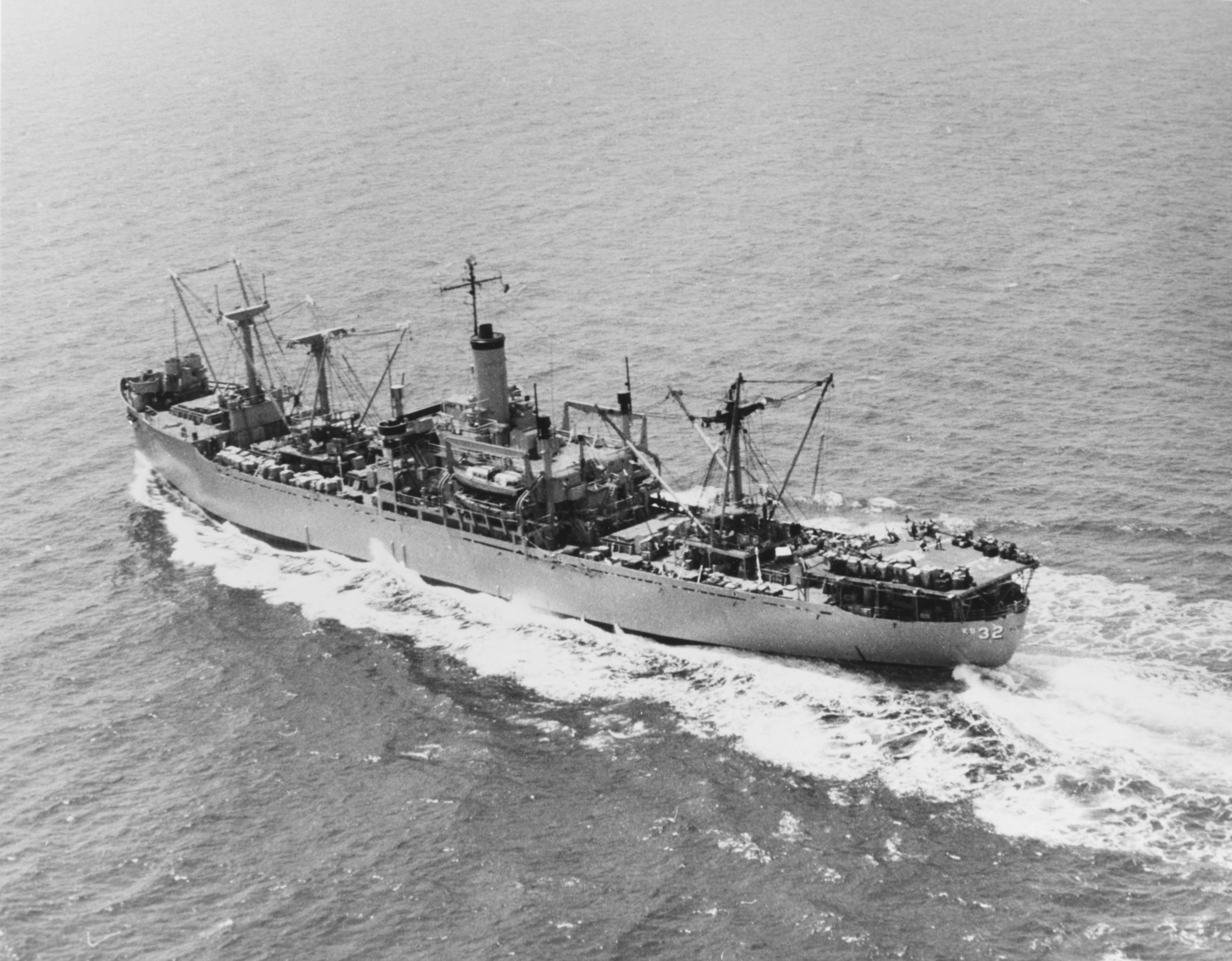
USS Altair underway in 1966. From the appearance of her decks and helicopter landing pad, aft, she is ready to commence an underway replenishment

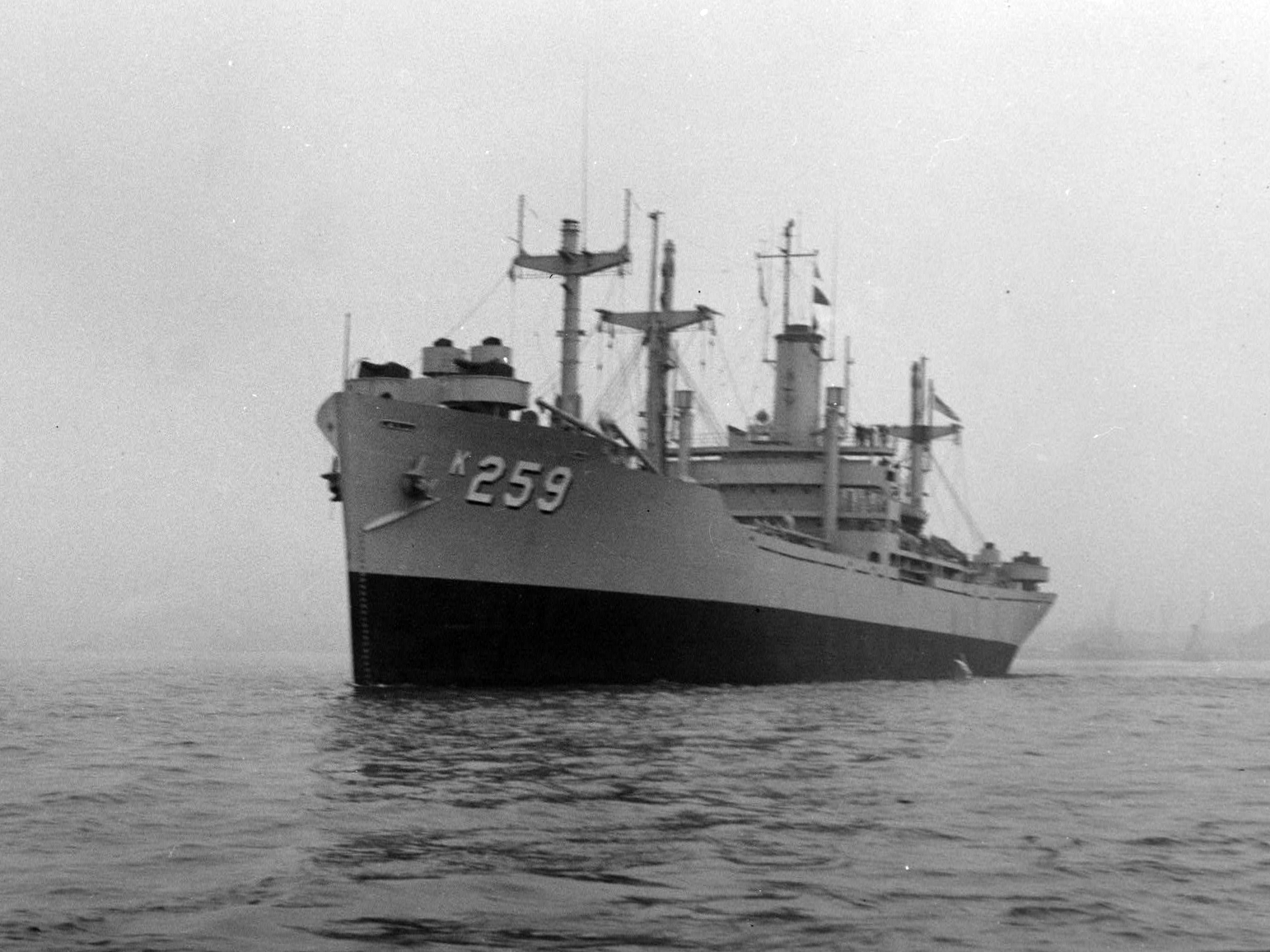
USS Alcor in 1952

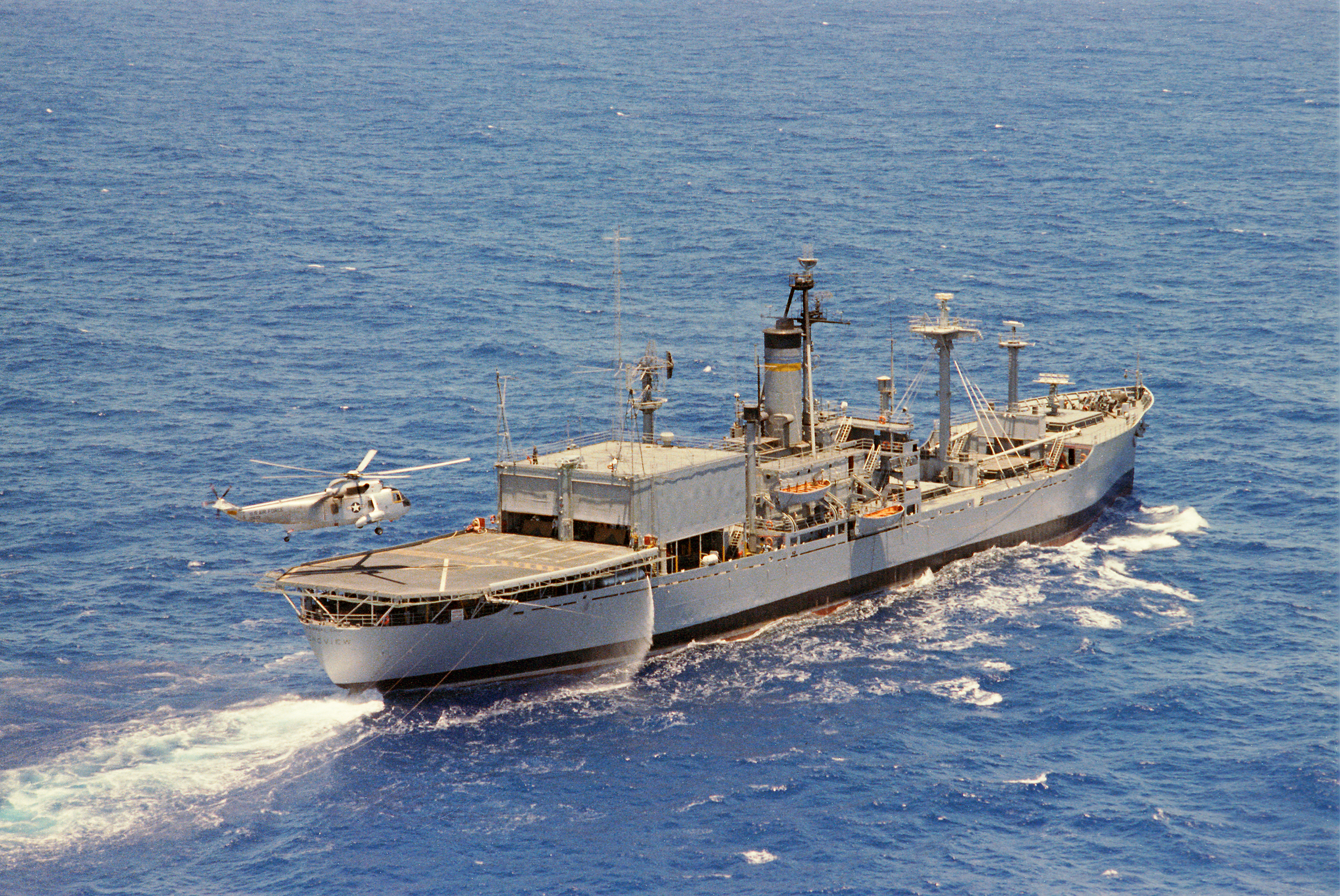
A Bell UH-1 helicopter landing on USNS Longview in July 1966

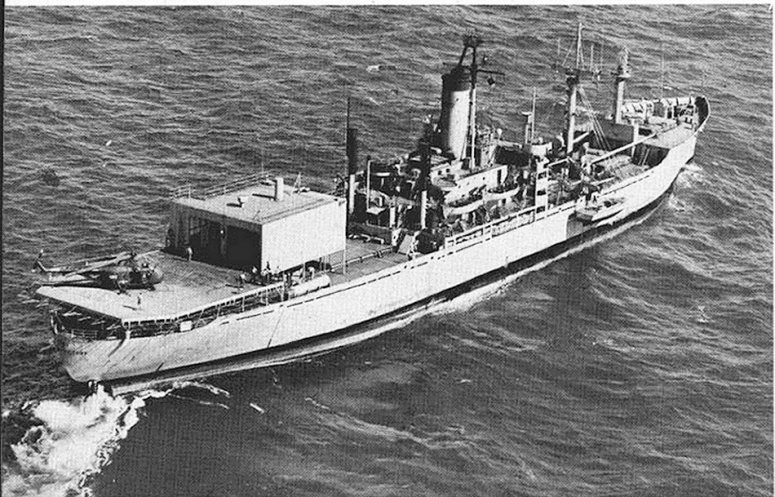
USNS Dalton Victory

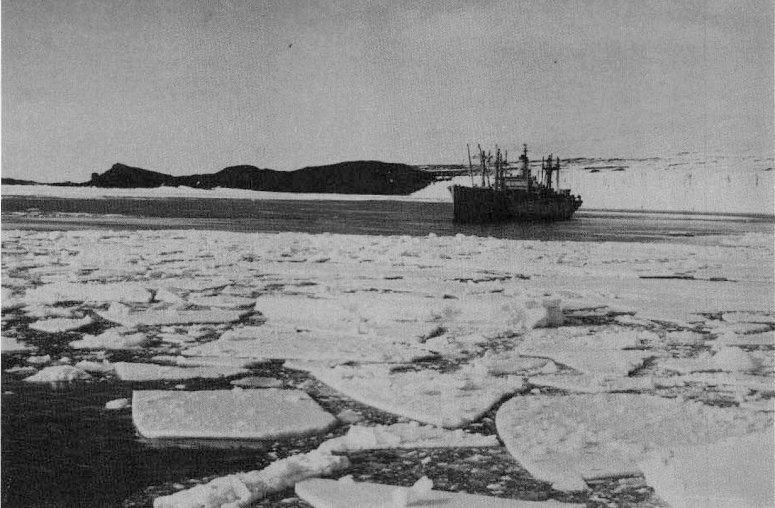
USNS Private John R. Towle underway in pack ice near Antarctica

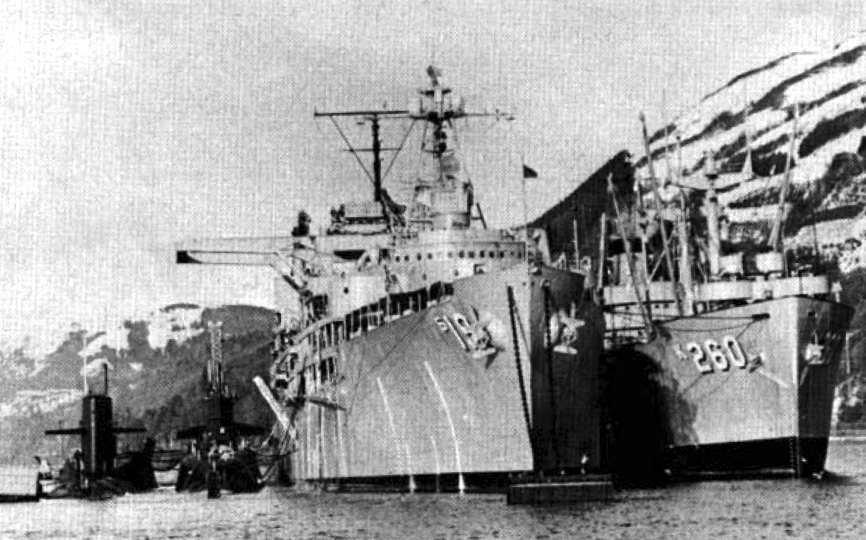
USS Proteus and Betelgeuse at Holy Loch

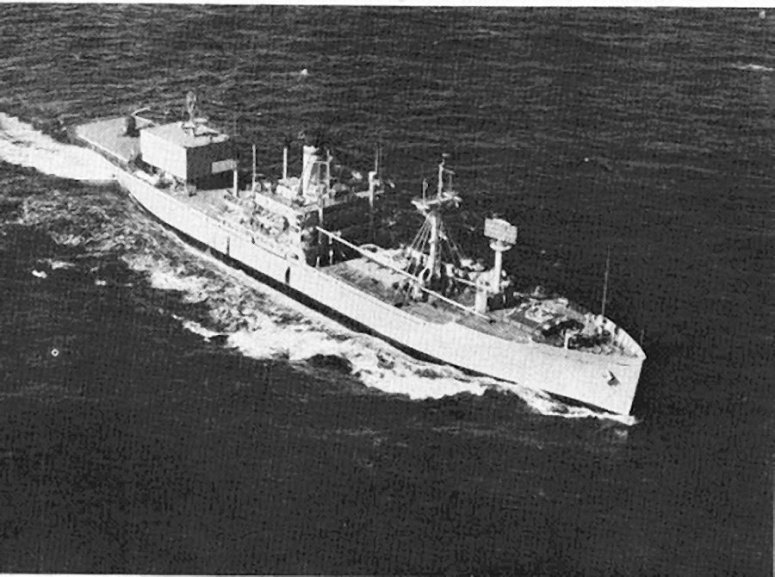
USNS Haiti Victory

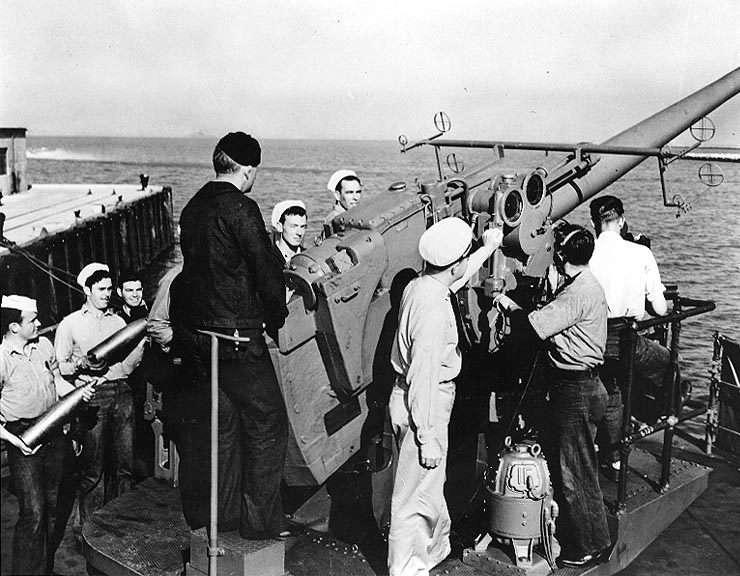
A Mk 21 5-inch/38-caliber open pedestal mount like the one on the stern of a Greenville Victory-class cargo ship.

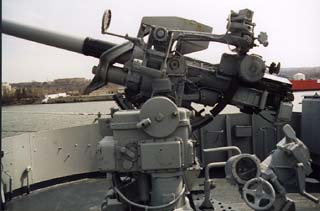
A 3 in (76 mm)/50-caliber dual-purpose gun like the one on the bow of a Greenville Victory-class cargo ship.

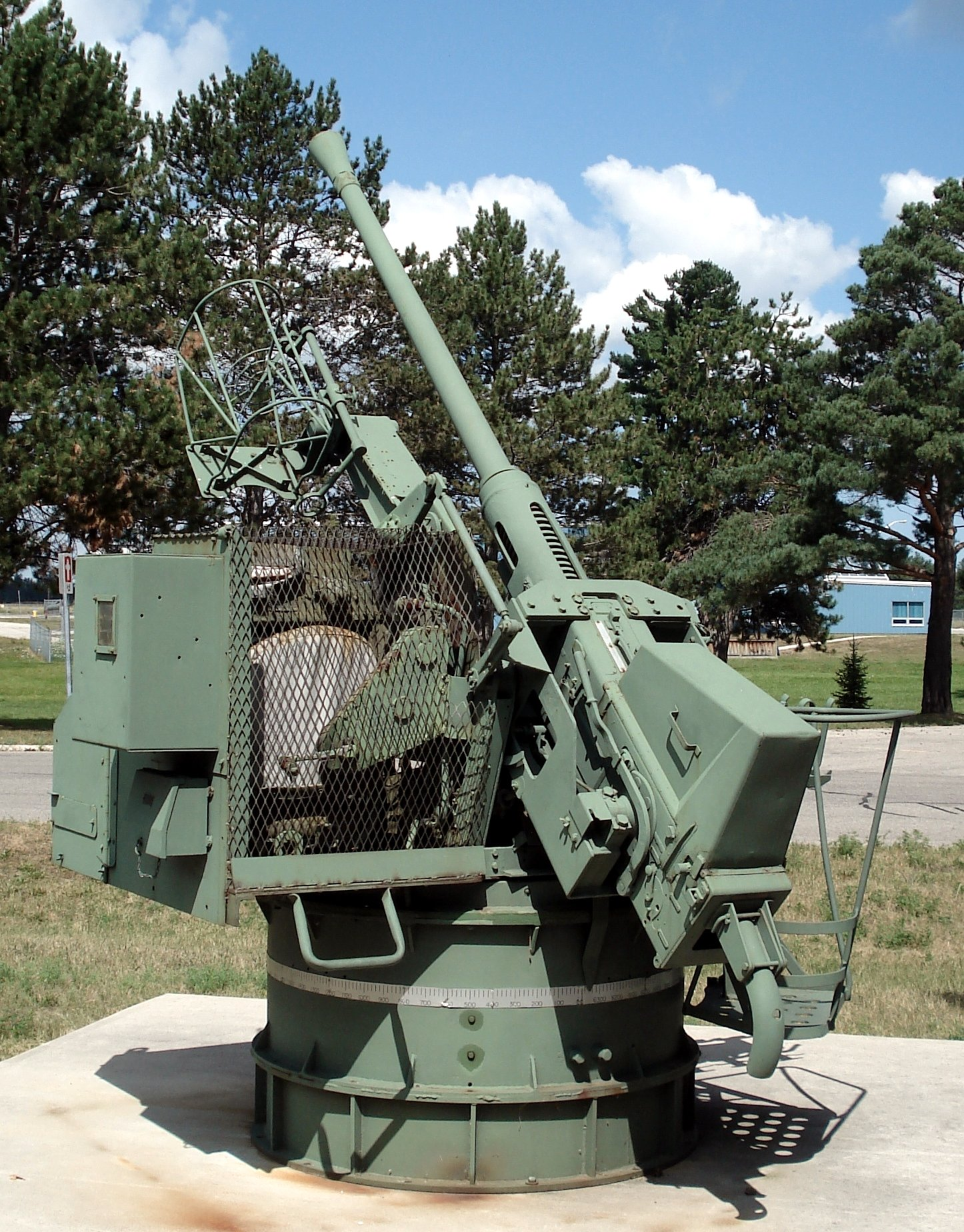
A single 40 mm Bofors "Boffin" mounting, an upgrade to some of the Greenville Victory-class cargo ships

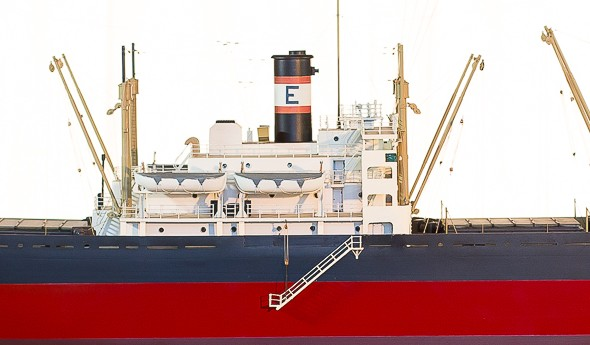
A Greenville Victory-class cargo ship superstructure and center boom cranes

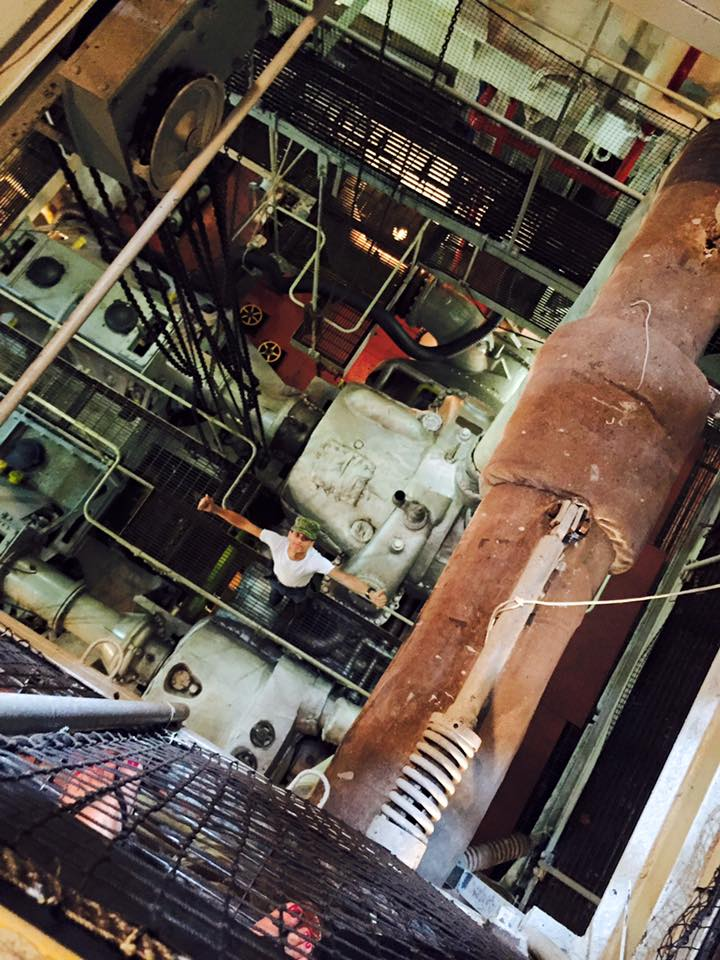
Looking down on the engine room of an older Victory ship

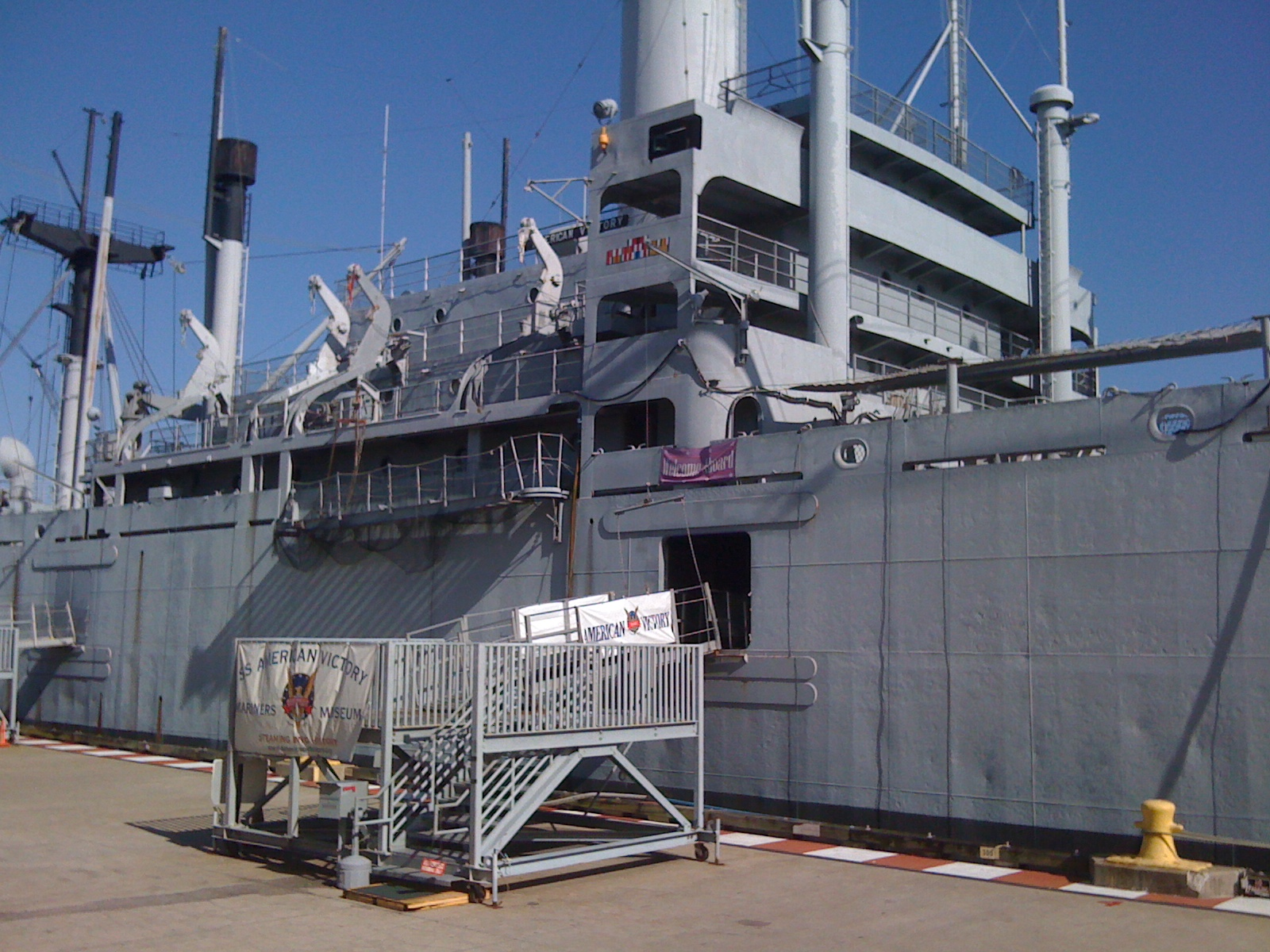
Victory ship starboard side

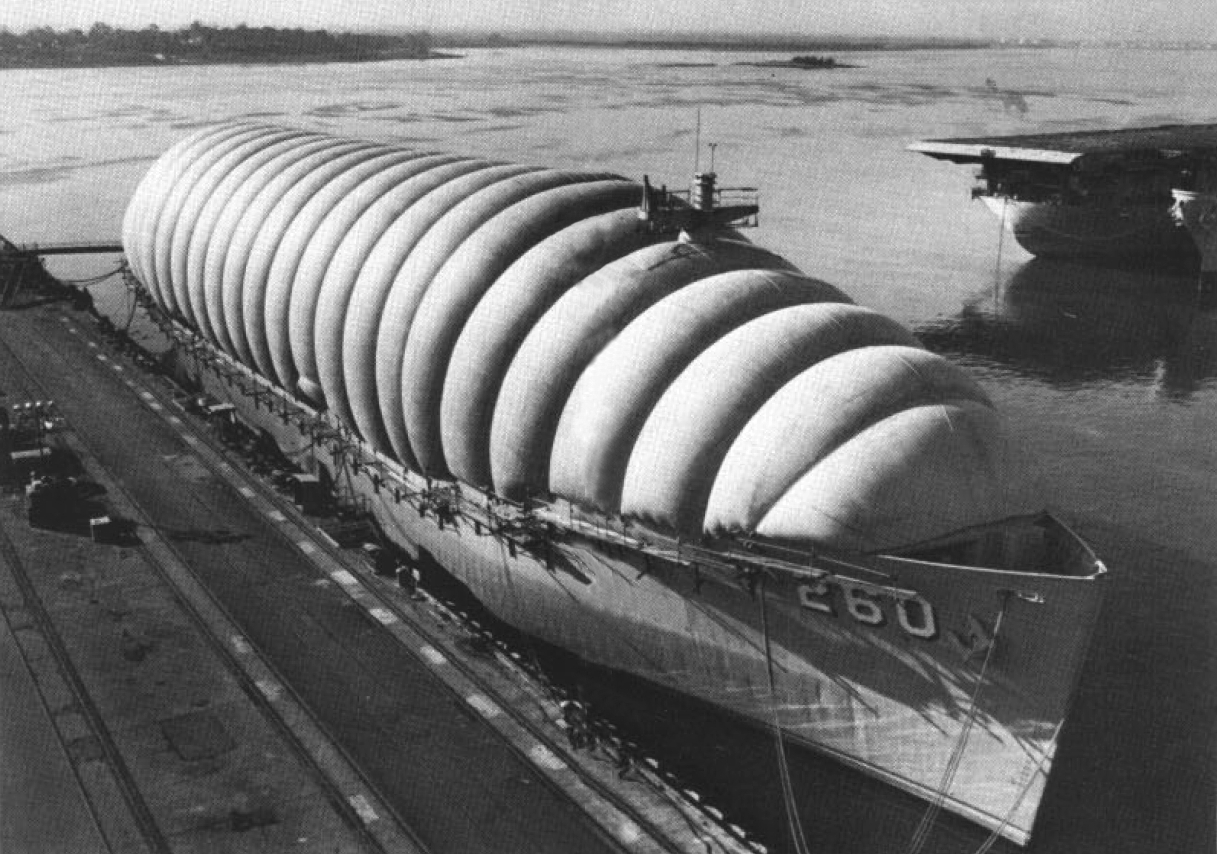
USS Betelgeuse in the reserve fleet

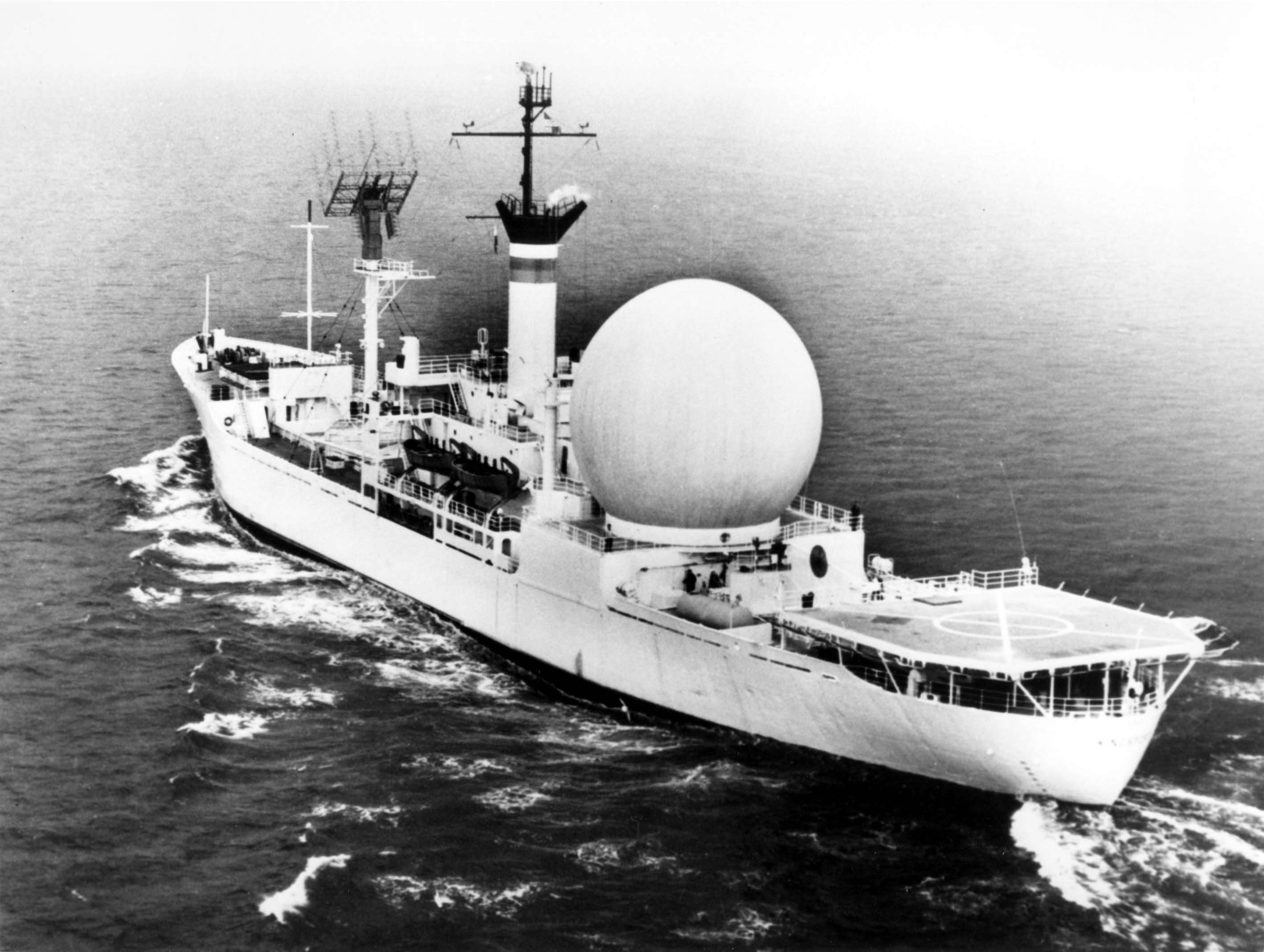
USNS Kingsport underway on 29 January 1963. The photo shows the 53-foot (16 m) white plastic dome that protects the 30-foot (9.1 m) stabilized parabolic antenna.

== See also ==
- List of auxiliaries of the United States Navy
- Empire ships
- List of Victory ships
- T2 tanker
- Type C1 ship
- Type C2 ship
- Type C3 ship
