= USNS Kingsport =

Cargo ship of the United States Navy

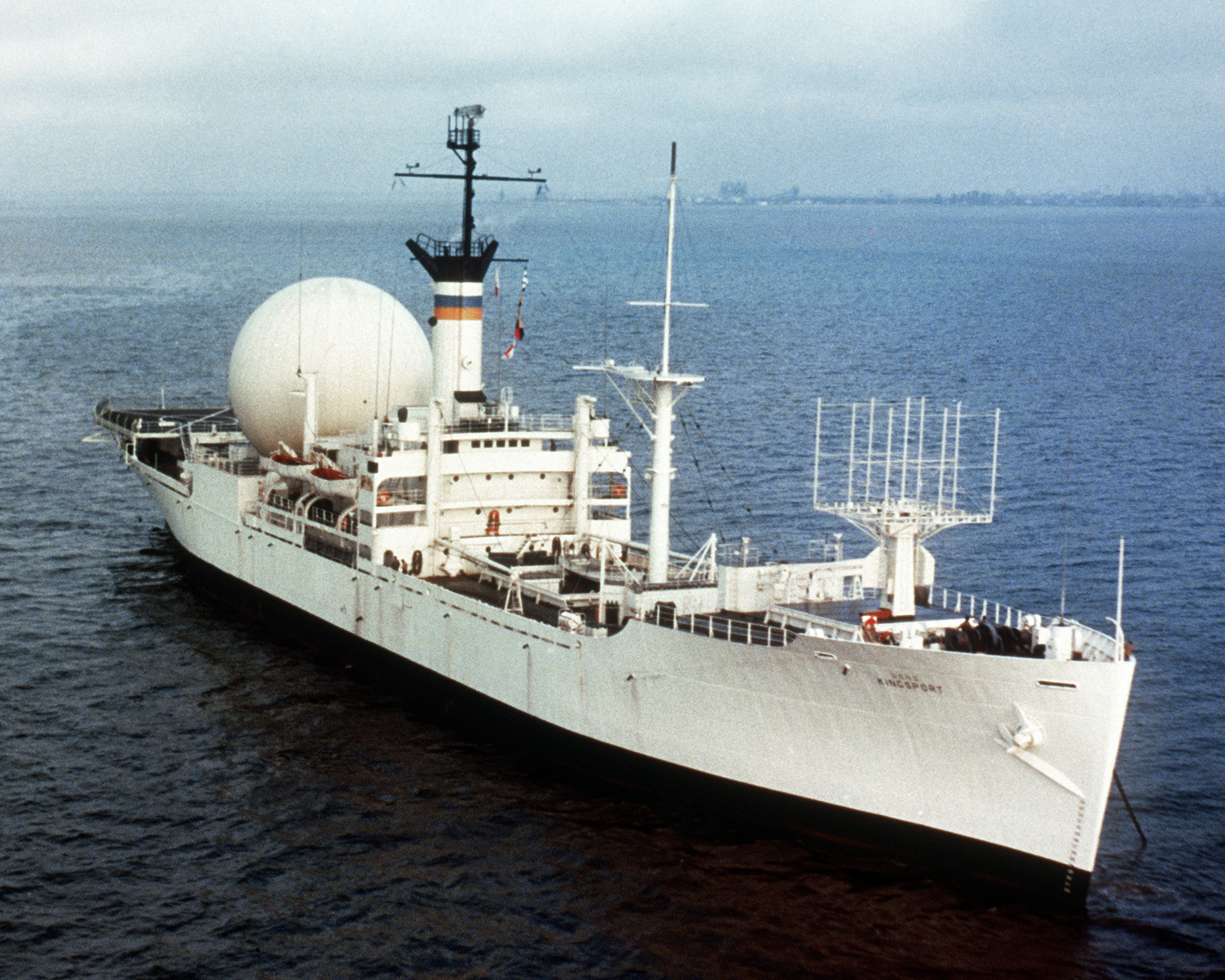
- A starboard bow view of the hydrographic research ship USNS Kingsport (T-AG-164) at anchor.

History

United States
- Name: Kingsport Victory
- Namesake: Kingsport, Tennessee
- Ordered: as type (VC2-S-AP2) hull, MCV hull 20
- Builder: California Shipbuilding Corporation, Los Angeles, California
- Laid down: 4 April 1944, as SS Kingsport Victory
- Launched: 29 May 1944
- Sponsored by: Mrs. George O'Brien
- Completed: 12 July 1944
- Acquired: 12 July 1944
- In service: WSA: 12 July 1944; Army: 8 July 1948
- Renamed: 14 November 1961, Kingsport
- Identification: Hull symbol:T-AK-239
- Honors and awards: 1 x battle star for World War II service
- Fate: Transferred to US Navy 1961

United States
- Name: Kingsport
- Namesake: Kingsport, Tennessee
- In service: Navy: 1 March 1950
- Out of service: 31 January 1984
- Renamed: 14 November 1961, Kingsport
- Refit: Philadelphia Naval Shipyard, Philadelphia, PA. from 1 June 1962 to 1 December 1962
- Stricken: 31 January 1984
- Identification: Hull symbol: T-AG-164; IMO number: 8450641
- Fate: Withdrawn from the reserve fleet on 21 January 1992 for scrapping in India

General characteristics
- Class & type: as T-AK-239: Greenville Victory-class cargo ship
- Type: MARAD VC2-S-AP3
- Tonnage: 7,653 GRT
- Displacement: 4,420 metric tons (4,350 long tons) (standard); 10,680 metric tons (10,510 long tons) (full load)
- Length: 455 ft 3 in (138.76 m) LOA
- Beam: 62 ft (19 m)
- Draft: 28 ft 6 in (8.69 m)
- Installed power: 8,500 shp (6,300 kW)
- Propulsion: 1 × Cross compound steam turbine; 1 × shaft
- Speed: 16.5 knots (30.6 km/h; 19.0 mph)
- Complement: 52
- Armament: 1 × 5 inch (127 mm)/38 caliber gun (Kingsport Victory only); 1 × 3 inch (76 mm)/50 caliber gun (Kingsport Victory only); 8 × 20 mm Oerlikon (Kingsport Victory only); None for (USNS Kingsport)
- Aviation facilities: Helicopter deck added 1961

USNS Kingsport (T-AG-164) was built as SS Kingsport Victory, a United States Maritime Commission VC2-S-AP3 (Victory) type cargo ship. During the closing days of World War II the ship was operated by the American Hawaiian Steamship Company under an agreement with the War Shipping Administration. After a period of layup the ship was operated as USAT Kingsport Victory by the Army under bareboat charter effective 8 July 1948. When Army transports were transferred to the Navy's Military Sea Transportation Service the ship continued as USNS Kingsport Victory (T-AK-239), a cargo transport . On 14 November 1961, after conversion into the first satellite communication ship, the ship was renamed Kingsport, reclassified as a general auxiliary, and operated as USNS Kingsport (T-AG-164).

The ship was sent to Lagos, Nigeria as the control station for Syncom 2 becoming the site of the first two way call by satellite by heads of state. The call was between Nigerian Prime Minister Abubakar Balewa aboard the Kingsport and President John F. Kennedy on 23 August 1963. In 1967 the ship underwent conversion and became a bathymetric and acoustic survey ship for the installation and maintenance of the then classified Sound Surveillance System (SOSUS) under the unclassified name of Project Caesar,

== Construction ==
Kingsport Victory, a United States Maritime Commission VC2-S-AP3 (Victory) type cargo ship, was laid down 4 April 1944 with launch on 29 May and completion on 12 July 1944 with delivery to the War Shipping Administration (WSA) on the same day at Los Angeles. She was built under the Emergency Shipbuilding program under cognizance of the U.S. Maritime Commission. Basic dimensions, not counting modifications for satellite communications, were length 436 feet 6 inches (133.0 m) (LBP), 62 feet (18.9 m) beam and 7,653 GRT.

== World War II and Army service ==
Kingsport Victory was immediately placed in operation by the American-Hawaiian Steamship Company, under a War Shipping Administration general agency agreement, supplying troops in the Pacific. She made trips between California and Pearl Harbor. On 17 October 1944 she steamed from California, arriving at Milne Bay in New Guinea on 2 November. She carried cargo to US troops and ships at Eniwetok, Iwo Jima, Guam, Ulithi atoll and Okinawa. Kingsport Victory was active delivering support for the Battle of Iwo Jima from 19 February to 26 March 1945. In battle she had to use her deck guns to defend against air attacks. Kingsport Victory received one Battle star for her service. After the war, in December 1945 she steamed from Okinawa to Hong Kong, then Calcutta; through the Suez Canal she arrived at New York City on 27 February 1946. During 1946 she moved cargo from the US east and west coasts.

After the war, on 29 September 1947, she was taken out of service and placed in the reserve fleet at Lee Hall, Virginia. On 8 April 1948 the ship was taken out of reserve and bareboat chartered to the War Department for operation as the USAT Kingsport Victory a US Army Transport. During this time the ship was involved in a legal case, Johansen, v. United States, involving rights of an Army civil service employee crew member in personal injury cases. On 1 March 1950 she was removed from US Army Transport and transferred the US Navy.

== Navy MSTS service ==
Kingsport Victory was among large Army ships transferred to the Navy's Military Sea Transportation Service (MSTS) with Kingsport Victory being transferred effective 1 March 1950. The ship carried military cargo for the next eleven years as USNS Kingsport Victory (T-AK-239) as a Greenville Victory-class cargo ship. Kingsport Victory is seen in an Air Force documentary film on the construction of the Dew Line loading supplies at Norfolk, Virginia and unloading at Halifax, Nova Scotia.

Assigned to duty supporting the U.S. Army Satellite Communications Agency USNS Kingsport was further modified and, in August 1963 while in Lagos harbor, transmitted the first satellite voice call between heads of state when John F. Kennedy and Nigerian Prime Minister Abubakar Balewa aboard Kingsport spoke in a two-way call. A demonstration of transmission of oceanographic data was made between a research vessel off Africa via the ship and satellite to Washington. The first air to ship satellite communication took place when Navy aircraft off Virginia established voice communication with Kingsport which was off Morocco. Further satellite communications work took place in the Pacific and Indian Oceans. Kingsport then supported Project Gemini into March 1966. After conversion from satellite configuration, particularly removal of the large and very visible dome, Kingsport was engaged in acoustic work for the Navy supporting undersea surveillance programs.

=== Satellite communications ship Kingsport ===
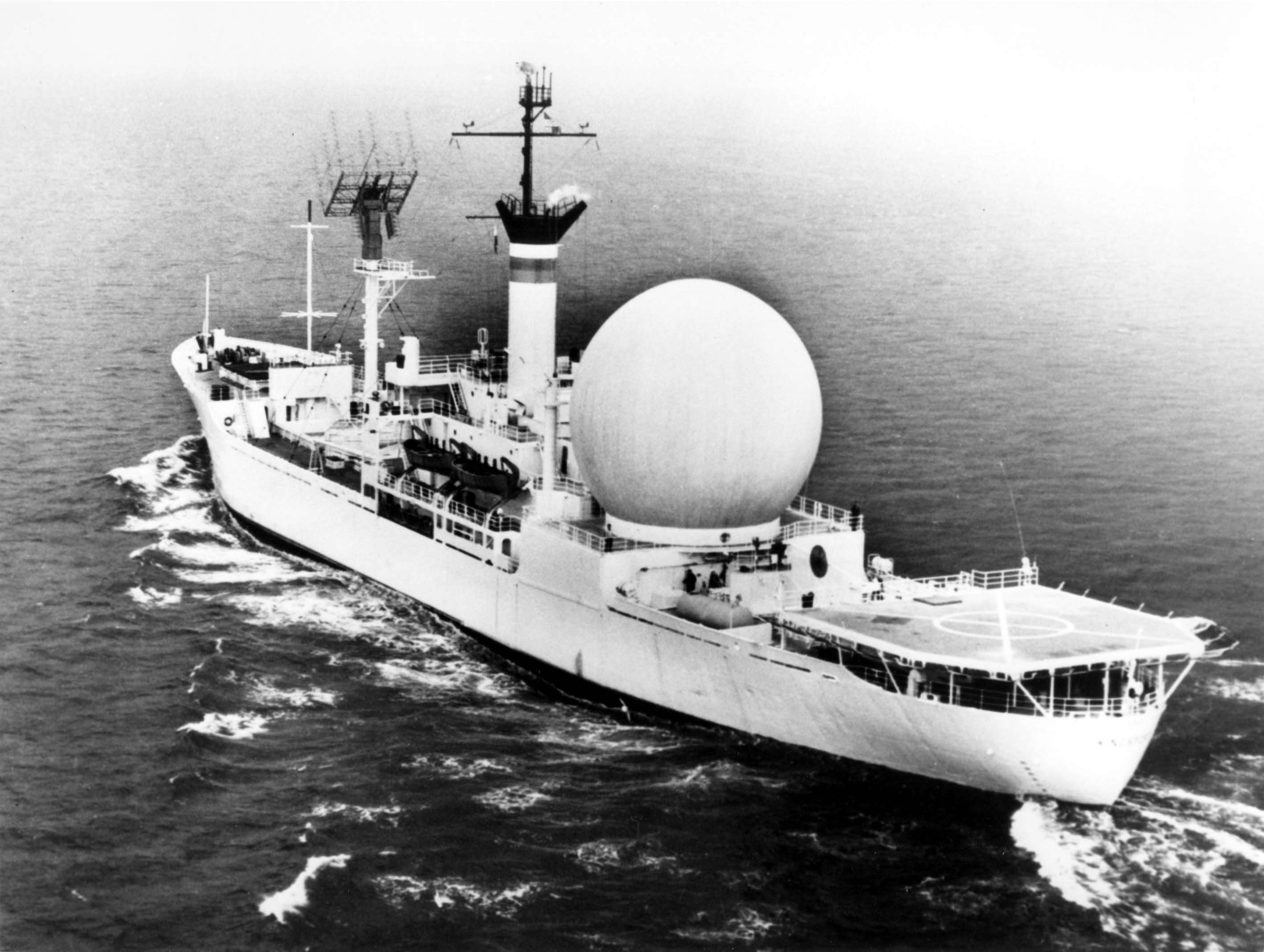
USNS Kingsport (T-AG 164) under way, 29 January 1963. The photo shows the 53-foot white plastic dome that protects the 30-foot stabilized parabolic antenna.

On 24 September 1961, she was delivered to the Portland, Oregon facilities of Willamette Iron & Steel Company where she underwent conversion to become the first satellite communications ship. On 14 November 1961 she was renamed Kingsport and reclassified AG-164.

Designed for use by the United States Army Satellite Communications Agency in the defense satellite communications programs, Project ADVENT, USNS Kingsport underwent extensive alteration during conversion. A special high frequency radio station was installed for ship-to-shore communications. She received advanced tracking and telemetry equipment and anti-roll stabilization tanks. In addition, a 30-foot, gyro-stabilized, computer-oriented, triaxial, parabolic antenna was installed on her afterdeck. Housed in a 53-foot, plastic, air-pressurized radome, this antenna permitted precision tracking of a high altitude satellite at any angle above the horizon.

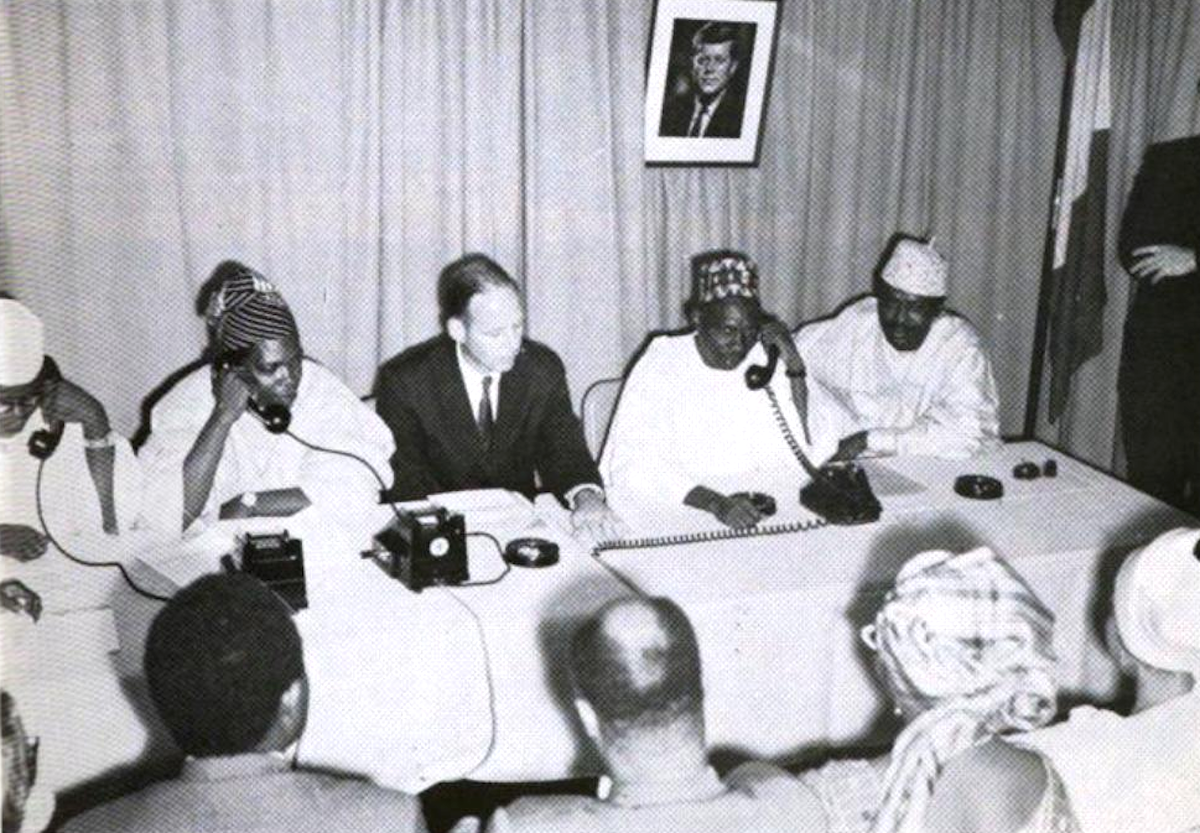
Prime Minister Balewa (2nd from right) talks to President John F. Kennedy on the first live broadcast via the SYNCOM satellite from USNS Kingsport in Lagos, Nigeria.

Kingsport sailed to Lagos, Nigeria after Syncom 2 had been successfully launched on 26 July 1963 to serve as the terminal control station during testing and evaluation of the satellite. On 23 August 1963, President John F. Kennedy in Washington, D.C., telephoned Nigerian Prime Minister Abubakar Balewa aboard the Kingsport docked in Lagos Harbor via Syncom 2, the first geosynchronous communication satellite. It was the first live two-way call between heads of state by satellite. Syncom 2 and Relay 1 linked Nigeria, Brazil and the United States with Kingsport transmitting through Syncom 2 to New Jersey and New Jersey via Relay 1 to Rio de Janeiro. During this period Gulf of Guinea oceanographic data, composed of depths temperature and salinity from a 1,000 metres (3,300 ft) station, were transmitted from the RV Geronimo to the National Oceanographic Data Center via Kingsport and Syncom 2.

Kingsport departed Lagos 23 September and during transit off Morocco on 2 October demonstrated the first satellite communications between an aircraft in flight when a Navy aircraft off the Virginia coast made voice contact with the ship via satellite. The ship reached Rota, Spain on 3 October, staying until 6 October, then sailed supporting communication tests in the Mediterranean from 7 to 25 October. Tests of voice and teletype links between the United States and ships of the 6th Fleet successful with the ship visiting Leghorn, Italy and Beirut, Lebanon during the voyage. After arriving in Rota 26 October and completing additional experiments she sailed for Norfolk 9 November and arrived 21 November.

Kingsport departed for the Pacific 17 February 1964 via Puerto Rico and the Panama Canal stopping at San Diego 13 March and reaching Pearl Harbor on 25 March 1964. For the next ten months the ship operated between Pearl Harbor and Guam supporting further communication experiments including those related to the evaluation of SYNCOM 3 after its launching 19 August 1964. Further experiments extended throughout the Western Pacific and into the Indian Ocean until July 1965.

She then provided support for NASA's Gemini crewed space shots serving as on station communications ship between Okinawa and the Philippines for Gemini 5 from 21 to 29 August. She supported three more Gemini flights between 4 December and 16 March 1966 before returning to the West Coast in April. She remained at San Francisco from 18 April to 27 October in a ready reserve status. During November she steamed to the East Coast, and in early 1967 was at New York undergoing repairs and alterations.

=== Survey ship ===
After completion of her communications support role the USNS Kingsport became a bathymetric and acoustic survey ship supporting Project Caesar, the installation and maintenance of the Sound Surveillance System (SOSUS), and undersea surveillance development. The ship was part of the "Caesar fleet" under the technical control of the project's Program Manager, then Naval Electronics Systems Command (NAVELEX PME-124). Among the now published reports, declassified in 2006, of the ship's work is a description of the Indian Ocean exercise code named BEARING STAKE that took place from January to April 1977.

== Disposal ==
Kingsport was placed out of service on 31 Jan 1984, transferred to the Maritime Administration for layup on 29 August 1984 then transferred back to the Military Sealift Command for scientific research on 1 March 1990. The ship was withdrawn from the reserve fleet on 21 January 1992 for scrapping in India.

== Honors ==
Crew of Naval Armed Guard on the SS Kingsport Victory' earned "Battle Stars" in World War II for war action during the assault occupation of Assault occupation of Iwo Jima from 13 March 1945 to 16 March 1945.

== Bibliography ==
- Applied Research Laboratory, The Pennsylvania State University (2010). From the Sea to the Stars: A Chronicle of the U.S. Navy's Space and Space-related Activities, 1944-2009 (PDF).
- Colton, T. (October 13, 2010). "California Shipbuilding, Los Angeles CA". ShipbuildingHistory. T. Colton. Archived from the original on 2 April 2015.
- Committee on Armed Services (U.S. Senate) (1978). Department of Defense Authorization for Appropriations for Fiscal Year 1979. Washington, D.C.: Government Printing Office. pp. 4244–4246.
- Fenner, Don F.; Cronin, William J. Jr. (1978). Bearing Stake Exercise: Sound Speed and Other Environmental Variability (PDF). New York: Naval Oceanographic Laboratory. Archived (PDF) from the original on March 4, 2016.
- Hanish, S.; Rollins, C. R.; Cybulski, J. (February 1978), Acoustic Fluctuation Workshop (Technical paper) (PDF), Washington: Naval Research Laboratory, archived from the original (PDF) on June 4, 2011
- Interagency Committee On Oceanography (June 1964). "United States participation in the International Indian Ocean Expedition and the International Cooperative Investigations of the Tropical Atlantic". ICO Report #6lP-64. Interagency Committee On Oceanography.
- "Integrated Undersea Surveillance System (IUSS) History 1950 - 2010". IUSS/CAESAR Alumni Association.
- Maritime Administration. "Kingsport Victory". Ship History Database Vessel Status Card. U.S. Department of Transportation, Maritime Administration. Archived from the original on March 4, 2016.
- Maritime Administration. "Kingsport (AG-164)". Ship History Database Vessel Status Card. U.S. Department of Transportation, Maritime Administration. Archived from the original on March 4, 2016.
- Dew Line: Documentary Construction Footage (film). Series: Moving Images Relating to Military Aviation Activities, 1900 - 2003. National Archives.
- Naval History And Heritage Command. "Kingsport Victory". Dictionary of American Naval Fighting Ships. Naval History And Heritage Command.*NavSource. "USNS Kingsport (T-AG-164)". NavSource.
- Uhlig, Thomas; Sellmaier, Florian; Schmidhuber, Michael (2014). Spacecraft Operations. New York: Springer. ISBN 978-3-7091-1802-3. LCCN 2014945749.
- United States Court of Appeals Second Circuit. "191 F.2d 162 JOHANSEN, v. UNITED STATES No. 275, Docket 22012".
- U.S. Fleet Forces Command. "The Month of August in American Naval History". U.S. Fleet Forces Command.
- Williamson, Mark (2006). Spacecraft Technology: the early years. London: Institution of Electrical Engineers. ISBN 978-0-86341-553-1. LCCN 2008530215.
