= USNS Greenville Victory =

Cargo ship of the United States Navy

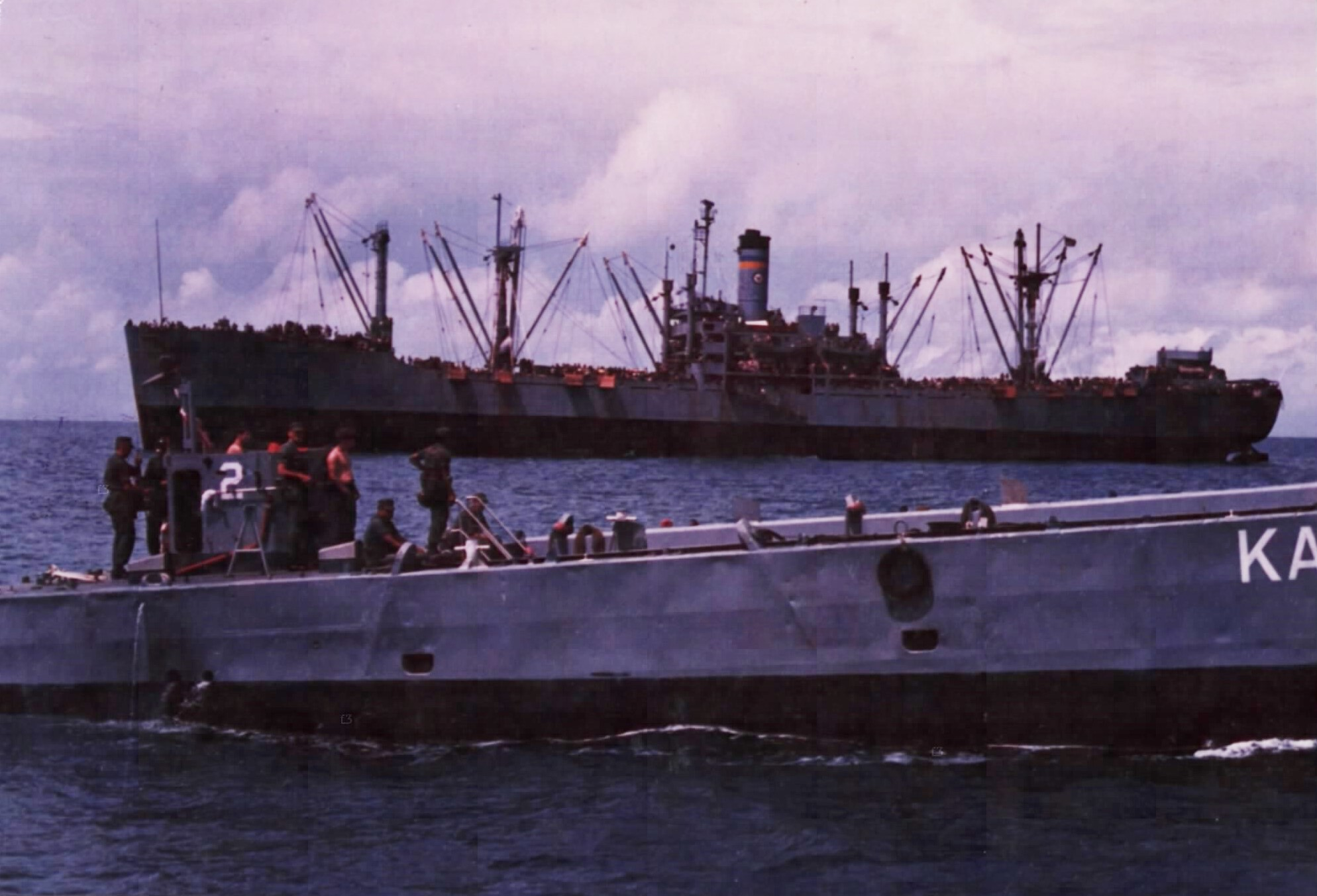
- Greeneville Victory during the evacuation of Phan Rang, 4 April 1975

History

United States
- Name: Greenville Victory
- Owner: War Shipping Administration – 1948 US Navy
- Operator: Seas Shipping Company (1944–1948)
- Ordered: as type (VC2-S-AP2) hull, MCV hull 18
- Builder: California Shipbuilding Corporation, Los Angeles, California
- Laid down: 21 March 1944, as SS Greenville Victory
- Launched: 28 May 1944
- Sponsored by: Miss Mary J. Vukov
- Completed: 7 July 1944
- Commissioned: 30 March 1948, as USAT Greenville Victory
- Decommissioned: 1 March 1950
- In service: 1 March 1950 as USNS Greenville Victory (T-AK-237)
- Out of service: 22 March 1976
- Stricken: 16 January 1987
- Identification: Hull symbol: T-AK-237
- Fate: Sold for scrapping to Andy Corp., 26 May 1983

General characteristics
- Class & type: Greenville Victory-class cargo ship
- Displacement: 4,512 metric tons (4,441 long tons) (standard); 15,580 metric tons (15,330 long tons) (full load)
- Length: 455 ft (139 m)
- Beam: 62 ft (19 m)
- Draft: 29 ft 2 in (8.89 m)
- Installed power: 6,000 shp (4,500 kW)
- Propulsion: 1 × Westinghouse turbine; 2 × Babcock & Wilcox header-type boilers, 525psi 750°; double Westinghouse Main Reduction Gears; 1 × shaft
- Speed: 15.5 knots (28.7 km/h; 17.8 mph)
- Complement: 12 Officers; 87 Enlisted
- Armament: 1 × 5 in (130 mm)/38-caliber dual-purpose gun; 1 × 3 in (76 mm)/50-caliber dual-purpose gun; 8 × 20 mm (0.79 in) Oerlikon cannons anti-aircraft gun mounts

SS Greenville Victory was a cargo Victory ship built in 1944, during World War II under the Emergency Shipbuilding program. The ship’s United States Maritime Commission designation was VC2-S-AP3, hull number 18 (V-18). Post-war she was acquired by the United States Army and renamed as USAT Greenville Victory. She was acquired by the United States Navy in 1950, renamed USNS Greenville Victory (T-AK-237) and assigned to the Military Sea Transportation Service (MSTS) who operated her safely through the Korean War and Vietnam War campaigns. She was the lead ship in her class of 9 ships that were transferred to the MSTS in 1950. She returned home with two battle stars to her credit and was struck in 1987.

== Victory built in California ==
Greenville Victory was laid down under U.S. Maritime Commission contract by California Shipbuilding Corporation, Los Angeles, California; 21 March 1944; launched 28 May 1944; sponsored by Miss Mary J. Vukov; and delivered to the War Shipping Administration (WSA) 8 July 1944.

== World War II operations ==
During the remainder of the World War II, SS Greenville Victory served as a merchant ship under charter to Sea Shipping Company of New York City. She served in the Pacific War, participating in the Battle of Okinawa. In Okinawa from 27 May 1945 to 19 June 1945 she supplied goods as a cargo ship and used her deck guns to defend herself and other ships from attacks.

== U.S. Army service ==
Following World War II, she transported cargo in the Atlantic Ocean and the Pacific Ocean as the USAT Greenville Victory, a Greenville Victory-class cargo ship. She was transferred to the Army Transportation Service in the spring of 1948. Part of her service included returning the remains of U.S. servicemembers who had been killed in World War II for reburial at home, including the remains of 3,734 servicemembers who arrived at the Brooklyn Army Base on 26 June 1948, most of them coming from cemeteries in France.

Acquired by the Navy on 1 March 1950, she was assigned to MSTS as a (T-AK-237).

== Korean War era service ==
Crewed by civilians from the Maritime Commission, Greenville Victory, from 1950 to 1953, operated in the Atlantic Ocean and the Caribbean, carrying military cargo to French, English, and German ports; Guantanamo Bay; and the Panama Canal Zone.

Between 19 February and 9 May 1953, she sailed out of New York City to the Far East and back, loaded with ammunition for Korea. After completing a run to Europe and back, she again departed New York 9 July 1953 for the Far East. She reached Yokohama, Japan, 9 August and during the next 2 months operated in the Western Pacific Ocean, carrying ammunition to Formosa and to French forces fighting Communist Viet-Minh guerillas in French Indochina. Sailing from Yokohama 4 1953 October via San Francisco, California, she reached New York City 6 November 1953 to resume cargo runs to Europe.

== Services at the world's poles ==
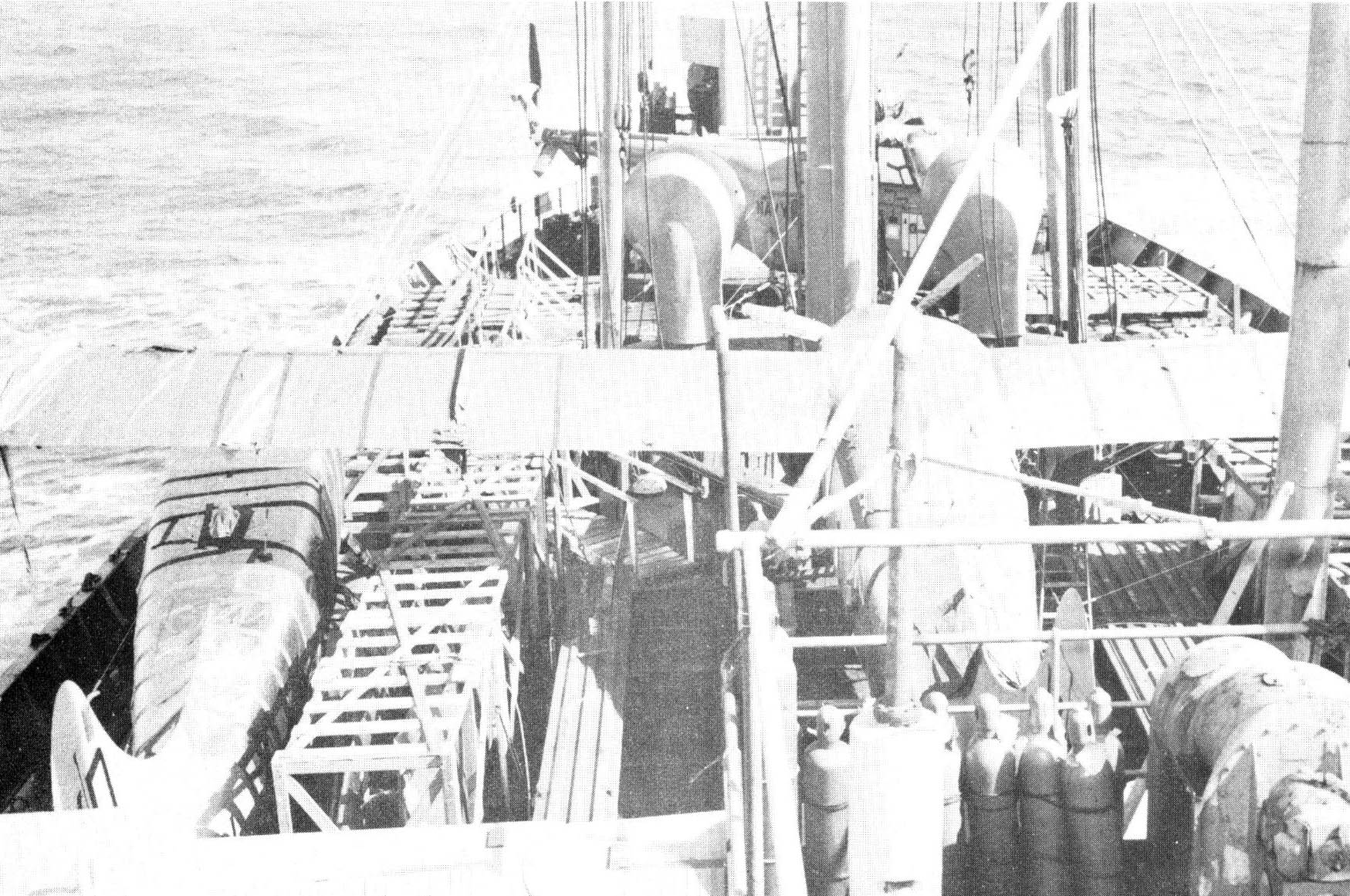
Greenville Victory during Operation Deep Freeze in 1956.

During the next 2 years, Greenville Victory steamed primarily between New York City and West European ports. In June and July 1954 she sailed to the Western Mediterranean to replenish at-sea ships of the U.S. 6th Fleet. On 16 November 1955, she departed Newport, Rhode Island, for Antarctica and arrived at McMurdo Sound 16 January 1956 to provision ships of Task Force 43, as part of the Navy's Operation Deep Freeze. Departing Antarctica on 5 February 1956, and traveling via New Zealand, she arrived in New York on 28 March. Before the operation her hull was strengthened for Arctic ice conditions.

Between 1956 and 1964 Greenville Victory maintained a busy schedule transporting cargo to American bases scattered throughout the world. She replenished Task Force 43 on three more Antarctic deployments; and, from December to February 1956–57, 1957–38, and 1960–61, she operated in Antarctic waters. Cargo runs sent her to the Caribbean in 1958, 1960, and 1962 and to Thule Air Base, Greenland, during September and October 1958.

She also deployed with the 6th Fleet five times between June 1956 and March 1964. On two deployments in 1963 and 1964 she transited the Suez Canal, steaming to India and Pakistan.

Greenville Victory departed Norfolk, Virginia, 6 October 1964 to participate in the massive transatlantic trooplift exercise, "Steel Pike I." Departing Morehead City, North Carolina, 8 October, she closed the Spanish coast off Rota 19 October. For more than 2 weeks she discharged supplies and cargo in support of amphibious and shore operations. Departing Rota 7 November, she steamed via Morehead City to New York, arriving 20 November.

== Vietnam War era service ==
Greenville Victory departed New York 22 November 1964 for duty in the Western Pacific for the Vietnam War. Sailing via San Diego, California, she arrived Guam 24 December. During the next month she steamed to Okinawa, Korea, and Japan, carrying cargo. Arriving at Manila, Philippines, on 26 January 1965, she sailed the 28th for Pearl Harbor and San Francisco, California. After reaching the West Coast of the United States on 25 February, she made a run out of San Francisco, California, to Seattle, Washington, then sailed for the U.S. Gulf Coast on 15 March, arriving New Orleans, Louisiana, on 28 March 1965.

During the next 5 months, Greenville Victory made cargo runs in the Atlantic out of Norfolk, Virginia, and New York. She departed New York 20 October 1965 after a voyage to Labrador and back. Steaming via Norfolk, Virginia, and Long Beach, California, she reached Yokohama, Japan, on 22 November 1965. Loaded with military cargo, she sailed for South Vietnam 30 November and arrived at Saigon 16 December. The following day she sailed via Vũng Tàu for the U.S. West Coast, arriving San Francisco 3 January 1966.

Greenville Victory replenished her holds with military supplies before returning to the Western Pacific. Sailing via Sasebo, Japan, she reached Bangkok, Thailand, on 13 February 1966. She sailed 22 February for South Vietnam and arrived Vũng Tàu the next day.

Having unloaded, she sailed 1 March 1966 for the U.S. West Coast to transport additional military material from the United States to South Vietnam. She continued operations between the United States and the Western Pacific until transferred to the Atlantic at mid-year. In 1967 she was busy supplying NATO forces in Europe.

In the aftermath of the Fall of Saigon on 30 April 1975 the ship took onboard over 5400 South Vietnamese refugees and delivered them to Guam a week later.

On 12 May 1975, six of the USNS Greenville Victory crew volunteered to help the recovery of the SS Mayaguez. The six received Merchant Marine Distinguished Service Medals for their role during the action: Clinton Harriman, Karl Lonsdale, Robert Griffin, Michael Saltwick, Hermino Rivera and Epifanio Rodriguez.

== Post-war decommissioning and career ==
On 22 March 1976 Greenville Victory was transferred to the U.S. Maritime Administration who placed her in the National Defense Reserve Fleet, James River Group, at Lee Hall, Virginia. On 26 May 1983 she was sold for scrapping at Brownsville, Texas. She was struck from the Navy List on 16 January 1987.

== Honors and awards ==
Greenville Victory participated in the following campaigns:

- Vietnam Defense – 16 December 1965
- Vietnamese Counteroffensive – 23 February 1965
- Battle Stars" in World War II for war action during the assault occupation of Okinawa from 27 May 1945 to 19 June 1945

Eligible Greenville Victory personnel were authorized the following:

National Defense Service Medal (2)
Korean Service Medal
Antarctic Service Medal
Vietnam Service Medal (2)
United Nations Service Medal
Republic of Vietnam Campaign Medal
Republic of Korea War Service Medal (retroactive)

== See also ==
- List of Victory ships
- Liberty ship
- Type C1 ship
- Type C2 ship
- Type C3 ship
