= USS Alcor (AK-259) =

Cargo ship of the United States Navy

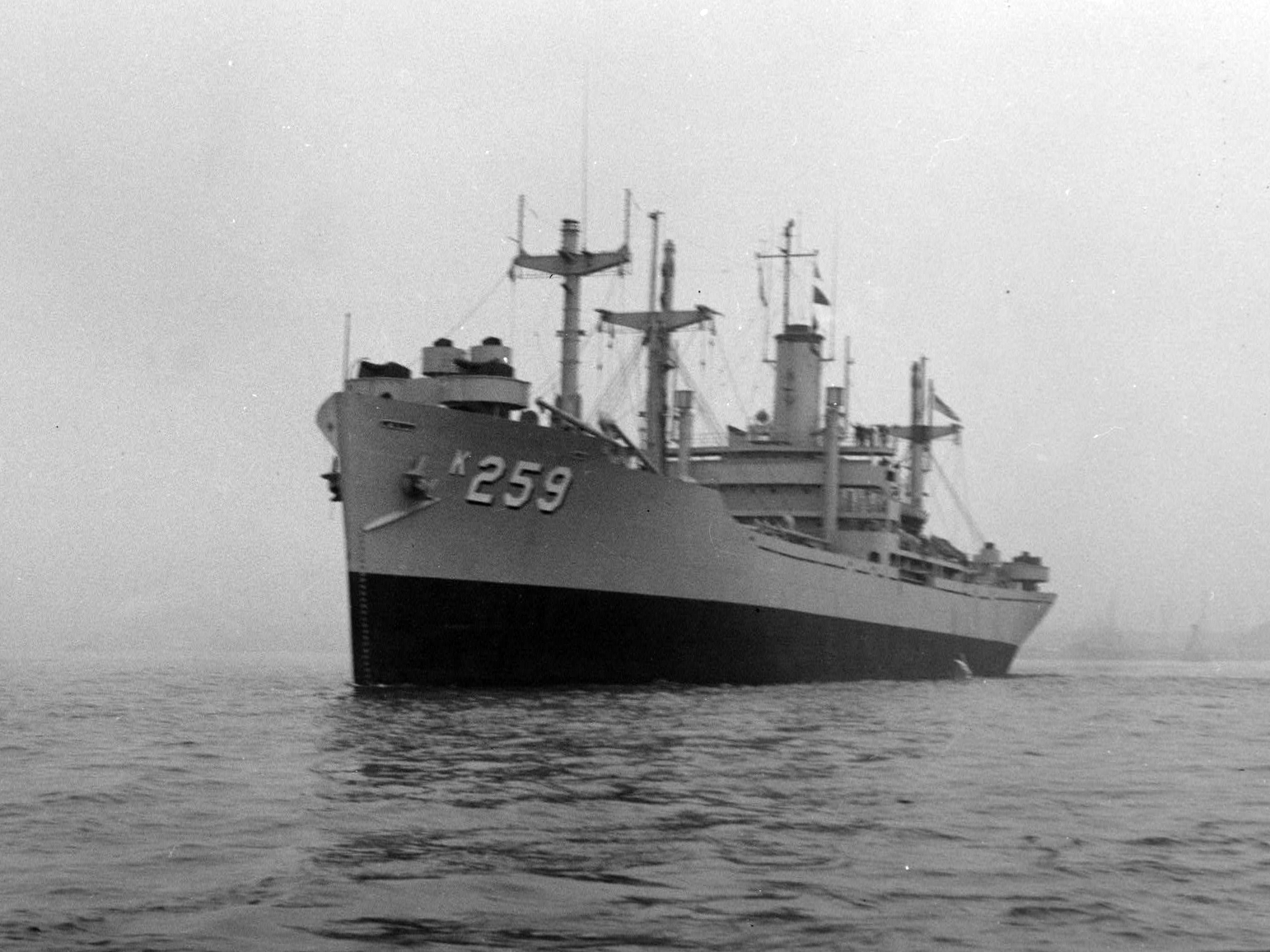

History

United States
- Name: SS Rockland Victory; Alcor
- Namesake: Mizar and Alcor
- Ordered: as type (VC2-S-AP3) hull, MCV hull 101
- Builder: Oregon Shipbuilding Corporation, Portland, Oregon
- Laid down: 28 February 1944, as SS Rockland Victory
- Launched: 29 April 1944
- Sponsored by: Mrs. Thomas M. Jones
- Completed: 19 May 1944
- Acquired: 16 July 1951
- Commissioned: 1 March 1952, as USS Alcor (AK-259)
- Decommissioned: 30 December 1968
- Stricken: 31 December 1968
- Fate: Sold for scrapping, 7 January 1970, (PD-X-853), at Charleston, S.C. to Lotti S.p.A., La Speza, Italy, for $95,323

General characteristics
- Class & type: Greenville Victory-class cargo ship
- Displacement: 4,512 metric tons (4,441 long tons) (standard); 15,580 metric tons (15,330 long tons) (full load)
- Length: 455 ft (139 m)
- Beam: 62 ft (19 m)
- Draft: 29 ft 2 in (8.89 m)
- Installed power: 8,000 shp (6,000 kW)
- Propulsion: 1 × Westinghouse turbine; 2 × Combustion Engineering header-type boilers, 525psi 750°; double Westinghouse Main Reduction Gears; 1 × shaft
- Speed: 18 knots (33 km/h; 21 mph)
- Complement: 145
- Armament: 8 × 40 mm (1.6 in) Bofors guns anti-aircraft gun mounts(4x2)

USS Alcor, AK-259, was a Greenville Victory-class cargo ship in service with the United States Navy from 1952 to 1968. She was originally built in 1944 as SS Rockland Victory, a World War II era Victory ship. She was sold for scrap in 1970.

== History ==
She was laid down under a Maritime Commission contract (MCV hull 101) on 28 February 1944 at Portland, Oregon, by the Oregon Shipbuilding Corp. She was launched on 29 April as SS Rockland Victory, sponsored by Mrs. Thomas M. Jones, a citizen of Portland. She was operated for the Maritime Commission by Waterman Steamship Company and a succession of contractors between 1944 and 1950 as a cargo ship, acquired by the Navy on 10 July 1951, converted for naval service by Ira S. Bushy and Sons, Inc., of Brooklyn, New York, and commissioned on 1 March 1952.

=== World War II ===
She served in the Pacific War, participated in the Battle of Okinawa from 16 April 1945 to 5 May 1945.

==== War Relief and Seacowboys ====
In 1946 after World War II the Rockland Victory was converted to a livestock ship, also called a cowboy ship. From 1945 to 1947 the United Nations Relief and Rehabilitation Administration and the Brethren Service Committee of the Church of the Brethren sent livestock to war-torn countries. These "seagoing cowboys" made about 360 trips on 73 different ships. The Heifers for Relief project was started by the Church of the Brethren in 1942; in 1953 this became Heifer International. The SS Rockland Victory was one of these ships, known as cowboy ships, as she moved livestock across the Atlantic Ocean. Rockland Victory made 7 trips she took 780 horses, several thousand baby chicks and hay bales to on each trip. Rockland Victory moved horses, heifers, and mules as well as some chicks, rabbits, and goats. In 1947 with her war and relief work done she was laid up in at Wilmington, North Carolina and later the James River as part of the National Defense Reserve Fleet.

=== Post World War II ===
The cargo ship was assigned to the Service Force, Atlantic Fleet, and homeported in Norfolk, Virginia. Between 1952 and August 1960, she made 19 deployments to the Mediterranean Sea to replenish the ships of the Sixth Fleet. In addition to these voyages, the vessel made eight short cruises to the Caribbean for replenishment of bases and units there as well as for training and liberty.

==== Missiles support ====
Between August and November 1960, Alcor underwent two restricted availabilities at the Norfolk Naval Shipyard which altered the cargo ship to enable her to transport, monitor, and handle Polaris missiles and their parts. Alcor was designated resupply ship for fleet ballistic missile submarines and tenders deployed overseas. Tests of her new capability were successfully conducted with training missiles alongside USS Proteus (AS-19) anchored five miles off Charleston, South Carolina in November 1960 and with the actual weapons alongside Proteus and USS George Washington (SSBN-598) at New London, Connecticut, in February 1961.

In March, Alcor got underway for her first of 15 resupply voyages to Holy Loch, Scotland, during the next four years in support of fleet ballistic missile operations. In 1962, her home port was changed to Charleston, South Carolina, to facilitate the loading of provisions and Polaris missiles for the tender deployed at Holy Loch. In April 1964, when the second overseas FBM resupply site was activated in Rota, Spain, she began operations replenishing the newly commissioned tender USS Holland (AS-32) based there and made six round trips during the first year.

From 1965 until 1968, Alcor continued to deploy to Rota and Holy Loch in support of the Polaris missile program. The cargo ship also delivered supplies where needed to units of the 2d and 6th Fleets and provided exercise and training services during Fleet operations in the Atlantic and Caribbean.

=== Decommissioning and fate ===
On 30 December 1968, Alcor was decommissioned at Charleston; and her name was struck from the Navy list on the following day. The cargo ship was sold to Lotti S.P.A. of Italy, in January 1970 and scrapped.

== Honors ==
Crew of Naval Armed Guard on the SS Rockland Victory earned "battle stars" in World War II for war action during the assault occupation of Okinawa from 16 April 1945 to 5 May 1945. She used her deck guns to defend herself and other ships in action.

== See also ==
- List of Victory ships
- Liberty ship
- Type C1 ship
- Type C2 ship
- Type C3 ship
- Norwalk Class Cargo Ships (similar role)
