= USNS Private John R. Towle =

Cargo ship of the United States Navy

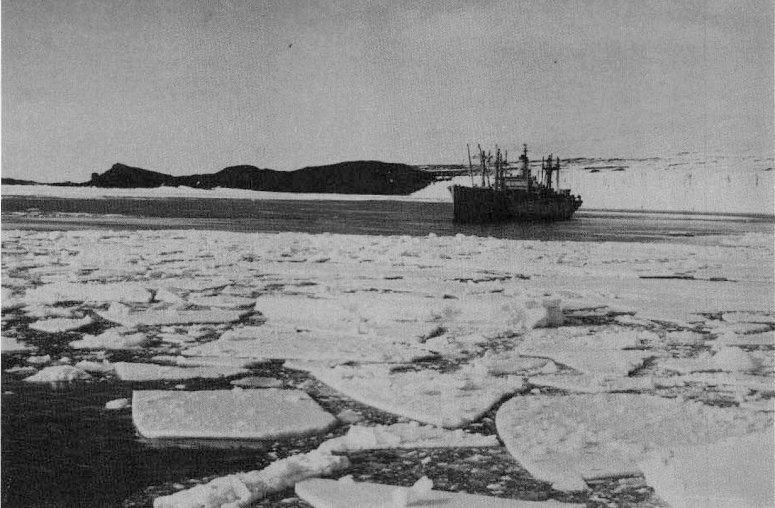
- USNS Private John R. Towle (T-AK-240) underway in pack ice near Antarctica.

History

United States
- Name: Appleton Victory; Private John R. Towle
- Namesake: Five cities in as many States in the United States share the name Appleton; John R. Towle awarded the Medal of Honor
- Ordered: as type (VC2-S-AP2) hull, MCV hull 162
- Builder: Oregon Shipbuilding Corporation, Portland, Oregon
- Laid down: 9 December 1944, as SS Appleton Victory
- Launched: 19 January 1945
- Sponsored by: Mrs. John Goodland, Jr.
- Completed: 23 March 1945
- Commissioned: 30 August 1946, as USAT Private John R. Towle
- Decommissioned: date unknown
- In service: 1 March 1950, as USNS Private John R. Towle (T-AK-240)
- Out of service: date unknown
- Stricken: 31 July 1982
- Identification: Hull symbol:T-AK-240
- Fate: Sold for scrapping 4 June 1982

General characteristics
- Class & type: Greenville Victory-class cargo ship
- Displacement: 4,960 metric tons (4,880 long tons) (standard); 15,589 metric tons (15,343 long tons) (full load)
- Length: 455 ft (139 m)
- Beam: 62 ft (19 m)
- Draft: 29 ft 2 in (8.89 m)
- Installed power: 8,500 shp (6,300 kW)
- Propulsion: 1 × steam turbine; 1 × shaft
- Speed: 15.5 knots (28.7 km/h; 17.8 mph)
- Complement: 99
- Armament: None

USNS Private John R. Towle (T-AK-240) was a Greenville Victory-class cargo ship that served as a commercial cargo ship during the final year of World War II. Post-war she was acquired by the U.S. Army as USAT Private John R. Towle until the 1950s when she was assigned to the U.S. Navy's Military Sea Transportation Service for various duties, including runs to Antarctica's McMurdo Sound.

== Victory built in Oregon ==
Private John R. Towle (AK-240) was laid down, under U.S. Maritime Commission contract, as Appleton Victory (MCV hull 162) by the Oregon Shipbuilding Corporation, Portland, Oregon, 9 December 1944; launched 19 January 1945; sponsored by Mrs. John Goodland Jr.

== World War II service ==
She was delivered to the Maritime Commission, thence to the American Mail Line for operation, 23 March 1945. She operated along the Pacific coast for a year, was returned to the Maritime Commission.

== U.S. Army service ==
Appleton Victory was transferred to the Army Transportation Service (ATS) at New York City, in June 1946. Later returned to the U.S. West Coast, she was renamed Private John R. Towle, 31 October 1947, and, under that name, continued to serve ATS until returned to the Maritime Commission; transferred to the Navy, and designated T-AK-240 in March 1950.

== U.S. Navy service ==
Between 1950 and 1955, the Victory ship, assigned to the Military Sea Transportation Service and crewed by the civil service, continued cargo operations in the Pacific Ocean.

=== Antarctic and Arctic Operations ===
Then reassigned to the Military Sea Transportation Service in the Atlantic, she began preparations for her first Antarctic resupply mission. During the southern summers of 1956–57, 1957–58, 1959–60, and 1960–61 she steamed south to deliver cargo to McMurdo Sound. On 20 January 1957, when delivering supplies, the then master of the vessel Capt John C Nissen-Wiis helped commemorate the opening of New Zealand's Scott's Base together with Sir Edmund Hillary and other dignitaries at Pram Point, Antarctica.

The ship made annual visits to Greenland to resupply the US Air Force base in Thule and Sonderstrom.

Needed elsewhere, the ice-strengthened AK did not return to Antarctic waters until the 1963–64 season. Since then, however, and into 1970, she returned annually to support the military and civilian personnel working there. She was active in Antarctic re-supply as late as March 1980.

== Post-war decommissioning and career ==
During July 1974 Towle sustained ice damage to her hull off of Hamilton Inlet Labrador, Canada, and was assisted by the icebreaker USCGC Edisto (WAGB-284). On 25 August 1980 Private John R. Towle was returned to the U.S. Maritime Administration and laid up in the National Defense Reserve Fleet, James River Group, Lee Hall, Virginia. She was struck from the Navy List on 31 July 1982 and was sold for scrapping on 4 June 1982.

== Honors and awards ==
Eligible vessel personnel were authorized the following:

- National Defense Service Medal
- Antarctica Service Medal
- Battle Stars in World War II for war action with deck guns during the assault occupation of Okinawa from 19 May 1945-19 June 1945
