= USNS Dalton Victory =

American victory-class cargo ship

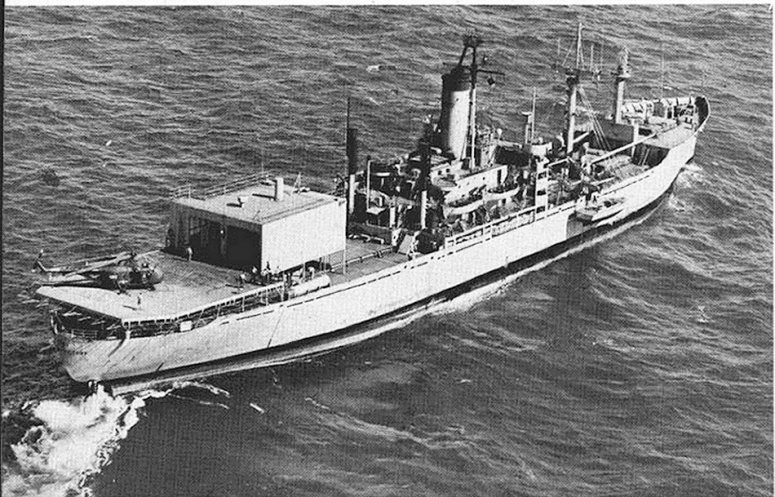
- USS Dalton Victory (T-AK-256)

History

United States
- Name: Dalton Victory
- Namesake: Dalton, Georgia, and; Dalton, Ohio
- Owner: War Shipping Administration (1944–1950)
- Operator: Sudden & Christenson Inc (1944–1946), Moore McCormack Lines, Inc. (1946–1947)
- Ordered: as type (VC2-S-AP3) hull, MCV hull 21
- Builder: California Shipbuilding Corporation, Los Angeles, California
- Laid down: 8 April 1944, as SS Dalton Victory
- Launched: 6 June 1944
- Completed: 19 July 1944
- Acquired: 2 April 1948, by the US Army Transportation Service
- Renamed: USNS Dalton Victory (T-AK-256)
- Reclassified: MSTS
- Identification: Hull symbol: T-AK-256
- Fate: Transferred to US Navy, 8 August 1950

United States
- Name: Sunnyvale
- Namesake: Sunnyvale, California
- Acquired: US Navy 8 August 1950
- Reclassified: 27 October 1960, T-AGM-5
- Stricken: 15 December 1974
- Identification: Hull symbol: T-AK-256; Hull symbol: T-AGM-5
- Fate: Sold for scrapping, 17 July 1975, to National Metal & Steel Corp.

General characteristics
- Class & type: Greenville Victory-class cargo ship (1945-1960); Longview-class missile range instrumentation ship (1960-1974)
- Displacement: 4,512 metric tons (4,441 long tons) (standard); 15,589 metric tons (15,343 long tons) (full load)
- Length: 455 ft (139 m)
- Beam: 62 ft (19 m)
- Draft: 29 ft 2 in (8.89 m)
- Installed power: 8,500 shp (6,300 kW)
- Propulsion: 1 × cross compound steam turbine; 1 × shaft
- Speed: 15.5 knots (28.7 km/h; 17.8 mph)
- Complement: 99
- Armament: 1 × 5 in (130 mm)/38-caliber dual-purpose gun (Dalton Victory only); 1 × 3 in (76 mm)/50-caliber dual-purpose gun (Dalton Victory only); 8 × 20 mm (0.79 in) Oerlikon cannons anti-aircraft gun mounts (Dalton Victory only); none as USNS Sunnyvale
- Aviation facilities: Helicopter deck added 1960; 2 × Hangars added 1960

SS Dalton Victory was built as Victory ship used as a cargo ship for World War II under the Emergency Shipbuilding program. She was launched by the California Shipbuilding Company on 6 June 1944 and completed on 19 July 1944 as a Greenville Victory-class cargo ship. The ship’s United States Maritime Commission designation was VC2- S- AP3, hull number 21. She was acquired by the U.S. Navy in 1950 and renamed the USNS Dalton Victory (T-AK-256).

In 1960 she was renamed USNS Sunnyvale (T-AGM-5) and rebuilt and placed in service as a missile range instrumentation ship, and assigned to the Pacific Missile Range, where she performed missile tracking duties.

== Constructed in Los Angeles, California ==
Dalton Victory (T-AK-256) was built by California Shipbuilding Corporation, Los Angeles, California, and was completed in 1944.

== World War II ==
SS Dalton Victory served in the Pacific War in World War II. She was a United States Merchant Marine ship. She was operated by Sudden & Christenson Inc from 19 July 1944 to 27 May 1946. On 27 May 1946, her operations was transferred to the Moore McCormack Lines, Inc till 3 October 1947. As a Merchant Marine ship she had a Merchant Marine crew and a United States Navy Armed Guard to man the deck guns. Dalton Victory had enemy attacks from the air, subs and ships. She was placed in the National Defense Reserve Fleet in the James River on 3 October 1947. One 2 April 1948, she was removed from the Reserve Fleet and put under the US Army Transportation Service. During the War the SS Dalton Victory too supplies to Pacific War. She was at the Battle of Leyte, Battle of Okinawa and Battle of Iwo Jima. During and after the war she had the difficult task of returning the bodies of fallen troops back to the US.

== Acquired by MSTS as a cargo ship ==
Dalton Victory was acquired by the Navy and assigned to the Military Sea Transportation Service (MSTS) as a Greenville Victory-class cargo ship in a noncommissioned status on 9 August 1950. SS Dalton Victory served as cargo ship supplying goods for the Korean War. SS Dalton Victory transported goods, mail, food and other supplies, making trips between the US and Korea.

== Assigned as a missile tracking ship ==
On 27 October 1960 Dalton Victory was reconfigured as a missile range instrumentation ship and renamed USNS Sunnyvale (T-AGM-5).

USNS Sunnyvale carried out a multitude of duties in the Pacific Ocean through 1962, including operations in support of the Pacific Missile Range, Point Mugu, California.

Two other ships were reconfigured in to this new class, Longview-class missile range instrumentation ship, the USNS Private Joe E. Mann (T-AK-253) and the USNS Longview (T-AGM-3).

== Inactivation ==
Sunnyvale was placed out of service at an unknown date, and was struck from the Navy List on 15 December 1974. She was disposed of by the U.S. Maritime Administration on 17 July 1975.

== In arts and popular culture ==
- Sunnyvale appears in Season 5 Episode 1 of the television crime drama The Streets of San Francisco at about 24'05". The episode is titled "The Thrill Killers: Part 1" and it aired on 30 September 1976 in the US, according to IMDb.

== See also ==
- Missile Range Instrumentation Ship
- List of Victory ships
- Liberty ship
- Type C1 ship
- Type C2 ship
- Type C3 ship
- USNS Haiti Victory (T-AK-238)
