= USS Betelgeuse (AK-260) =

Cargo ship of the United States Navy

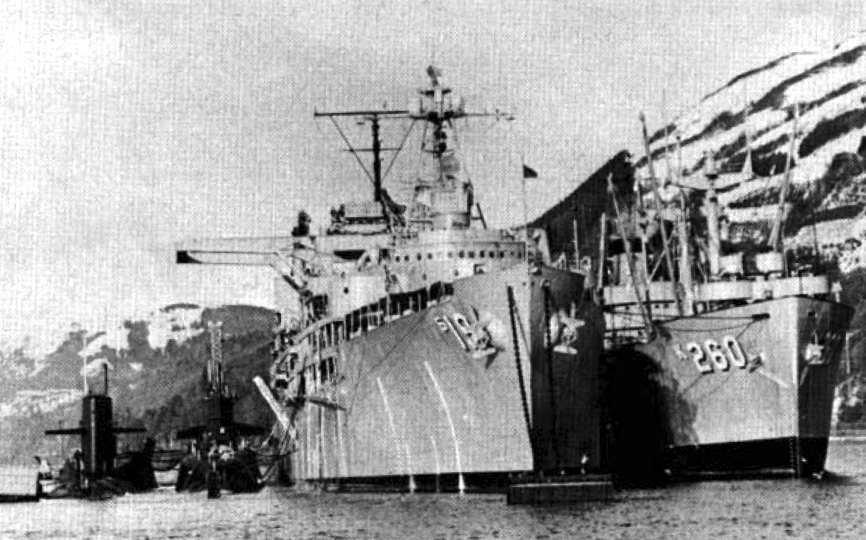
- USS Proteus (AS-19) and Betelgeuse (AK-260) at Holy Loch

History

United States
- Name: SS Colombia Victory (Note: Often mistakenly referred to as SS Columbia Victory.)
- Namesake: Republic of Colombia
- Owner: War Shipping Administration
- Operator: Ishmian SS Corp; Waterman SS Corp.; Grace Lines
- Ordered: as type (VC2-S-AP3) hull, MCV hull 10
- Builder: California Shipbuilding Company, Los Angeles, California
- Laid down: 11 February 1944
- Launched: 10 April 1944
- Sponsored by: Senora G. Restrepo
- Completed: May 31, 1944
- Fate: Sold to U.S. Navy, 1952

United States
- Name: USS Betelgeuse (AK-260)
- Namesake: Betelgeuse
- Owner: U.S. Navy
- Operator: U.S. Navy
- Acquired: 3 August 1951
- Commissioned: 15 April 1952
- Decommissioned: 15 January 1971
- Stricken: 1 February 1974
- Identification: Hull symbol: AK-260
- Fate: Sold for scrapping, 2 December 1975. Wrecked enroute to scrappers 17 January 1976
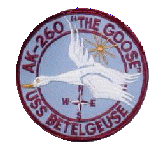
- Badge

General characteristics
- Class & type: Greenville Victory-class cargo ship
- Displacement: 4,960 long tons (5,040 t) (standard); 15,580 long tons (15,830 t) (full load)
- Length: 455 ft (139 m)
- Beam: 62 ft (19 m)
- Draft: 29 ft 2 in (8.89 m)
- Installed power: 6,000 shp (4,500 kW)
- Propulsion: 1 × Westinghouse turbine; 2 × Foster Wheeler header-type boilers, 525psi 750°; double Westinghouse Main Reduction Gears; 1 × shaft
- Speed: 15.5 knots (28.7 km/h; 17.8 mph)
- Complement: 145
- Armament: 1 × 5 inch (127 mm)/38 caliber gun as Victory ship; 1 × 3 inch (76 mm)/50 caliber gun as Victory ship; 8 × 20 mm Oerlikon as Victory ship and USN

USS Betelgeuse (AK-260) was the last of the Greenville Victory-class cargo ships in service in the United States Navy. On 10 April 1944, it was renamed the SS Colombia Victory after being launched as a Victory ship to carry cargo during World War II. She was transferred to the US Navy in 1951.

== Ship's history ==
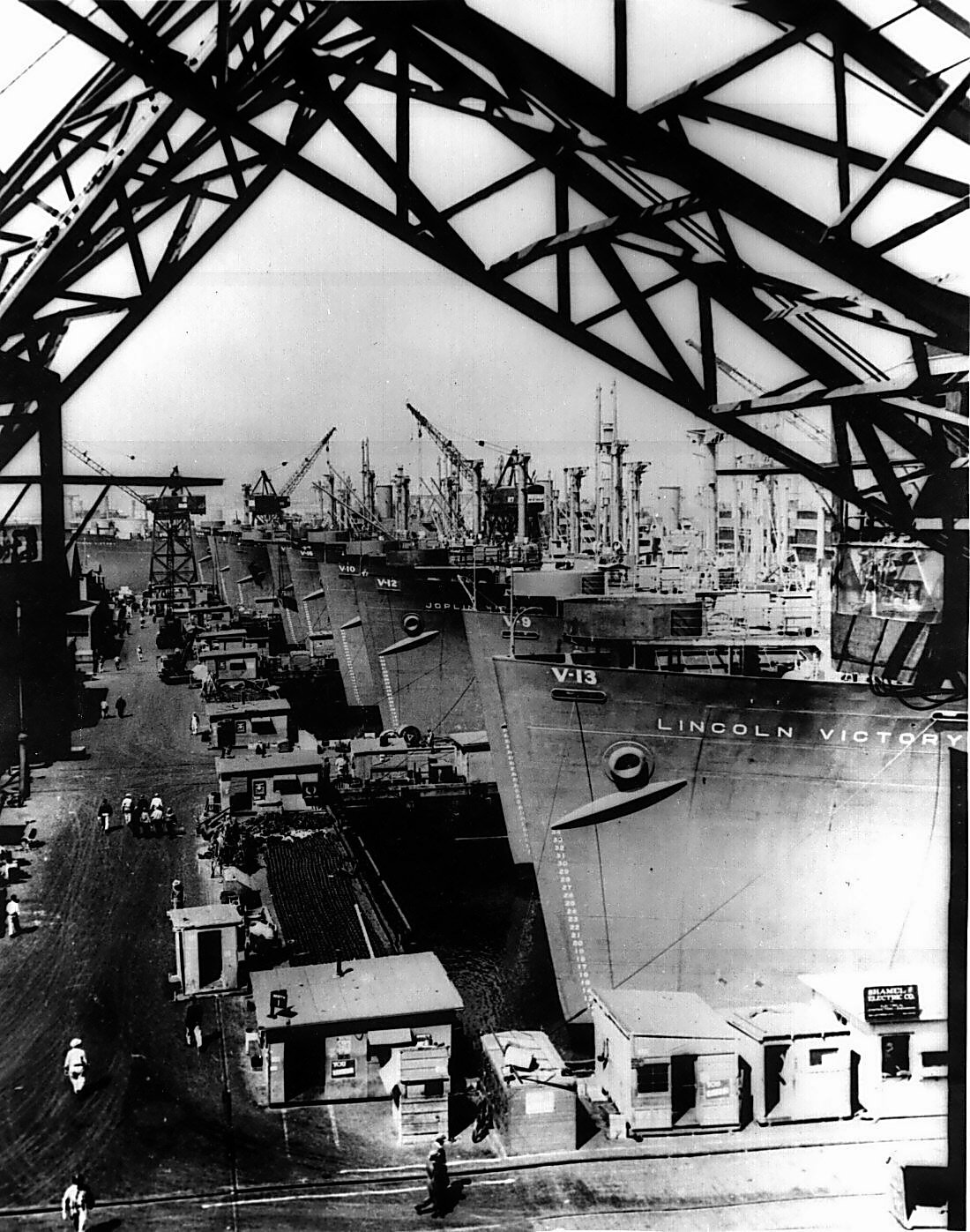
SS Colombia Victory, fourth ship, hull no. MCV-10 and other Victory cargo ships are lined up at a U.S. west coast shipyard

=== Construction ===
Betelgeuse was a Greenville Victory-class cargo ship constructed by the California Shipbuilding Company, Los Angeles, California, and commissioned in the merchant service as SS Colombia Victory in May, 1944. From 1944 through 1948, she was operated by the Grace Steamship Company, the Waterman Steamship Corporation and the Isthmian Steamship Company. In 1948, she was placed in Maritime Reserve Fleet until 1951 when she was purchased by the U.S. government and converted for Navy use.

== World War II - SS Colombia Victory ==
SS Colombia Victory, a U.S. Merchant Marine ship, was very active in the Pacific War operations during World War II. The SS Colombia Victory was tasked with delivering ammunition to troops The Colombia Victory was attacked at the Battle in the Philippines three times from November 4 to November 25, 1944. Her Naval Armed Guard crews earned "battle stars" for participating in the assault and occupation of Iwo Jima from 25 February to 6 March 1945. On 1 March 1945, the ship was delivering ammunition to marines on the beach of Iwo Jima and came under fire by Japanese artillery. Shore batteries opened fire on her and hit a worker on the aft deck but the ship was quickly turned around and moved out of firing range. The SS Colombia Victory also delivered supplies to US troops taking part in the Battle of Okinawa and Occupation of Okinawa from 27 May to 4 June 1945. As a Merchant Marine ship, she was operated by the Ishmian SS Corporation, the Waterman SS Corporation, and the Grace Lines.

After the war in 1948, Colombia Victory was laid up Wilmington, Delaware, as part of the United States Navy reserve fleets.

== USS Betelgeuse ==
On 15 April 1952 at Savannah, Georgia, she was commissioned by the Navy as the USS Betelgeuse (AK-260) and placed under the operational control of the Service Force, U.S. Atlantic Fleet. Cargo ships, like Betelgeuse, were named after heavenly bodies; Betelgeuse being a large star in the constellation Orion.

From her commissioning in 1952 through 1960, "Goose" made resupply missions to the Caribbean and the Mediterranean with occasional trips to base in the West Indies, Bermuda, and the Azores. While performing her mission as a Navy Cargo ship, Betelgeuse transferred practically every kind of cargo to ships, barges, and piers using every known transfer method.

=== 1960s ===
==== Conversion for Polaris support ====
In the summer of 1960, a significant modification was accomplished when Betelgeuse was modified to carry Polaris missiles and components in support of the Fleet Ballistic Missile program. This modification changed the mission of Betelgeuse from a fleet resupply ship to a link in the Polaris program.

After two years of operation as a Polaris resupply ship, Betelgeuse entered the shipyard for further modifications keyed to a more efficient stowage and transfer of Polaris missiles and their components. The major undertaking of this modification was the installation of vertical stowage of the Polaris missiles in Number Three hold. During the period 1 June through 7 September 1962, Betelgeuse, along with a normal overhaul, was again converted. Number Three hold received another major conversion, this time to the new concept of vertical stowage and transport of missiles.

With this conversion, Betelgeuse could now transport fourteen missiles in Number Three hold, five missiles (in containers), in Number Four hold, and four missiles (in containers) on the main deck, one on each side of both Number Four and Five hatches, for a total capacity of twenty-three missiles.

==== 1962 operations ====
Commencing in 1962, Betelgeuse (AK-260) made resupply runs to Holy Loch, Scotland and Naval Station Rota, Spain. She not only carried Polaris missiles and their components, but she also carried food, repair parts, clothing, fuel, and many other items which enabled the Polaris submarines to operate from a mobile base.

==== 1965–1966 operations ====
From December 1965 through March 1966, Betelgeuse underwent a regular overhaul at Detyen's Shipyard, Mount Pleasant, South Carolina. Betelgeuse was the first major ship to be overhauled at this shipyard and the largest ship ever to navigate the Wando River to the shipyard site. During the overhaul, two men earned the Navy and Marine Corps Medal for risking their lives in a successful rescue of two shipyard workers from a fume filled tank of an aviation gas barge.

Betelgeuse underwent refresher training in Guantanamo Bay, Cuba, in June 1966 following an FBM (fleet ballistic missile) resupply voyage to Rota, Spain in May with a four-day operational visit to Barcelona, Spain. Two FBM resupply voyages were made to Holy Loch, Scotland in July and September and an operational visit to Portsmouth, England. Two more FBM resupply voyages were made to Rota, Spain in October and November prior to going into upkeep and leave period in Charleston, South Carolina for the month of December.

==== 1967 operations ====
Betelgeuse (AK-260) was a unit of Service Squadron Eight until 1 July 1967 and then was transferred to Commander Submarine Force, US Atlantic Fleet and placed under the operational control of Commander Submarine Flotilla Six at Charleston, South Carolina.

From 1 January 1967 until 30 August 1967, Betelgeuse operated with the U.S. Atlantic Submarine Force providing services as required from retrieving torpedoes during target services to replenishment of the Polaris site at Charleston, South Carolina, with the exception of the period 4–22 June 1967 when Betelgeuse participated in Operation New Look. While on Operation New Look, Betelgeuse was granted a port visit to New York City.

==== Collision with Simon Bolivar ====
While conducting submarine services in August 1967, Betelgeuse was involved in a collision with the submarine Simon Bolivar (SSBN-641) which was submerged. Extensive damage to the underwater hull caused immediate flooding in Number Three hold with resultant leaks into Number Two hold and the engine room. There were no personnel injuries and Betelgeuse was able to return to Charleston under her own power and entered the Charleston Naval Shipyard for repairs during the period of 1 September through 8 October 1967. On 9 October 1967, Betelgeuse conducted sea trials with outstanding results.

==== 1967 operations ====
In October 1967, Betelgeuse made an FBM resupply trip to Rota, Spain. Upon returning to Charleston, Betelgeuse commenced loading for a replenishment trip to Bangor, Washington, via the Panama Canal for the first WESTLANT/EASTPAC replenishment, transiting the Panama Canal 17 November and arriving in Bangor, Washington 27 November. While in Washington, a visit to the Puget Sound Naval Shipyard had to be made to repair a leaky economizer tube in Number One boiler. On the return trip to Charleston, a one-day port visit was made of Balboa, Panama.

==== 1968 operations ====
From January 1968 through April 1968, Betelgeuse provided target services and retrieved torpedoes for submarines, performed site replenishment of the Polaris site at Charleston, made a liberty port visit to Miami, Florida, and an FBM resupply to Holy Loch, Scotland.

A dependent's cruise was conducted on 26 July 1968 and a liberty port visit was made to Fort Lauderdale, Florida, in August and another FBM resupply was made to Holy Loch, Scotland at the end of August 1968.

Betelgeuse participated in the first operational test of the fleet ballistic missile system for Commander Submarine Force, U.S. Atlantic Fleet in October and November 1968.

==== Rescue of Spirit of Love crew ====
Departing Charleston on 15 November 1968 for Holy Loch, Scotland, Betelgeuse came in contact with a 35-foot sailboat Sprit of Love foundering off course approximately 300 miles northeast of Bermuda on 18 November. Spirit of Love had departed New York for St. Thomas, Virgin Islands on 2 November. The three crewmen were taken on board and the sailboat taken in tow. The master had advised that the boat's engine was inoperative, sails gone, water and cooking fuel depleted, and only about two days food remained on board and the crew had been bailing for the past five days. While in tow in heavy seas and taking on water, Spirit of Love sank. The three crewmen were transferred via helicopter to the Essex (CV-9) and then flown to Bermuda. Betelgeuse resumed her track to Holy Loch, Scotland, arriving on 26 November. On 8 December 1968, Betelgeuse entered dry-dock in the Los Alamos (AFDB-7) at Holy Loch. After undocking on 20 December, Betelgeuse departed for Charleston and arrived 1 January 1969.

==== 1969 operations ====
During 1969, Betelgeuse twice provided target services and retrieved torpedoes for submarines and participated in two operational tests of the fleet ballistic missile system as down range support ship and once again a liberty port visit was made to Miami, Florida.

Betelgeuse went through a shipyard overhaul in Charleston Naval Shipyard from May through August 1969 in which $1,543,704 were spent in repairs and preservation of the ship. In December 1969, Betelgeuse went through refresher training at Guantanamo Bay, Cuba.

=== 1970s ===
From 1 January through 31 March 1970, Betelgeuse made one FBM site replenishment to Rota, Spain, and two FBM site replenishments to Holy Loch, Scotland. While underway on the second trip to Holy Loch on 28 February, after experiencing heavy seas for several days, the weather appeared to be clearing and the seas calming when the ship rode up on an unusually large wave of about 60 feet and pounded heavily, resulting in the rupture of a fuel tank under Number One hold. Arriving on 4 March, temporary repairs were made at Holy Loch. The ship then returned to Charleston arriving 21 March for dry-docking and permanent repairs.

During the months of April, May, August, and September, Betelgeuse was downrange support ship for operational tests of the fleet ballistic system for Commander Submarine Force, U.S. Atlantic Fleet. An operational visit was made to Ponta Delgada, São Miguel, Azores during the first test.

==== Deactivation and decommissioning ====
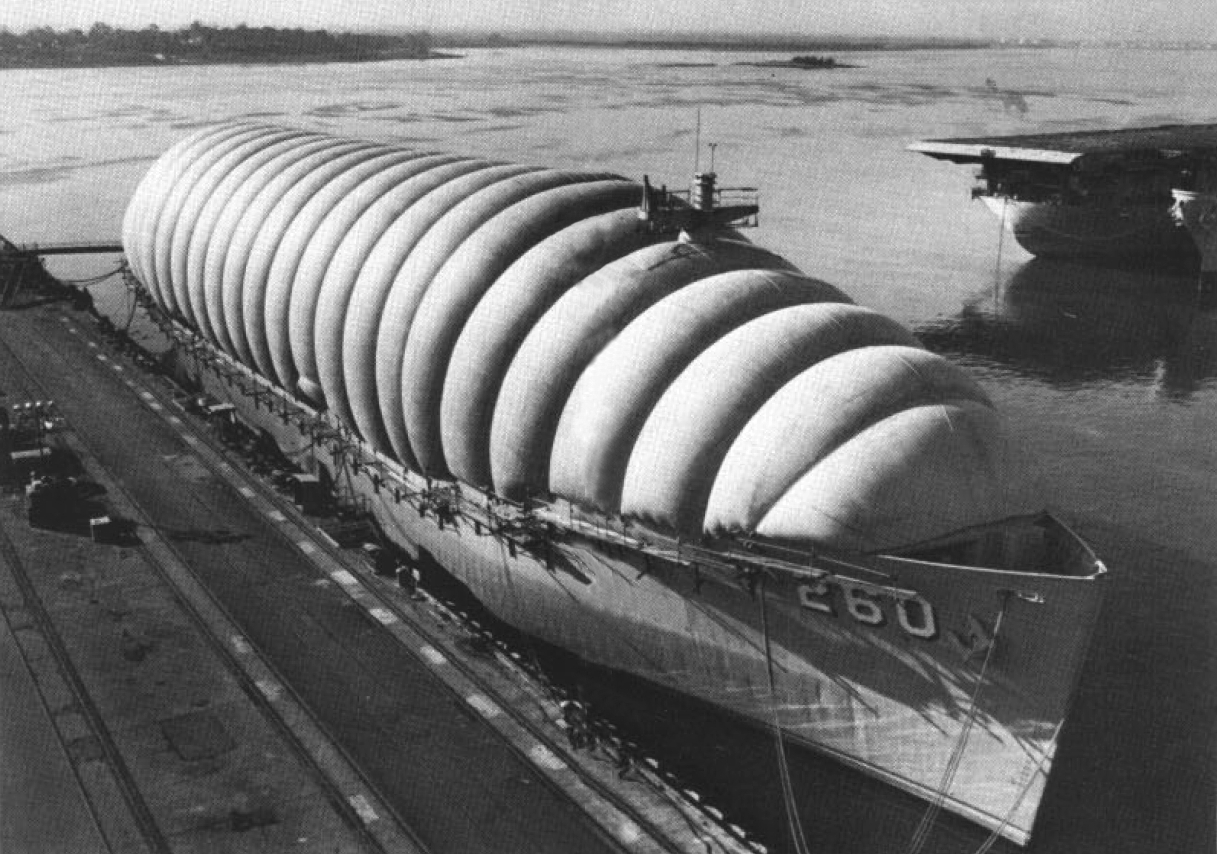
Betelgeuse experimentally mothballed

The Sub-Board of Inspection and Survey, Atlantic conducted a pre-inactivation inspection during the period 21–23 September 1970 and found Betelgeuse fit for further service provided three deficiencies were corrected. On 15 October 1970, operational control of Betelgeuse shifted to Naval Inactive Ship Maintenance Facility Portsmouth, Charleston Detachment and became inactive to prepare to enter the mothball fleet.

Betelgeuse was formally decommissioned on 15 January 1971.

Betelgeuse was towed to Philadelphia Naval Shipyard on 16 January 1971 and used in an experiment for encapsulation of mothballed ships. She was stricken from the Naval Vessel Register on 1 February 1974.

==== Destruction ====
Sold for scrapping to Luria Brothers & Co. in December 1975, while being towed to Texas in January 1976, the tug boat had to cut the tow cable due to high seas and Betelgeuse ran aground at Rodanthe, North Carolina.

== See also ==
- List of Victory ships
- Liberty ship
- Type C1 ship
- Type C2 ship
- Type C3 ship
