= USNS Haiti Victory =

Cargo ship of the United States Navy

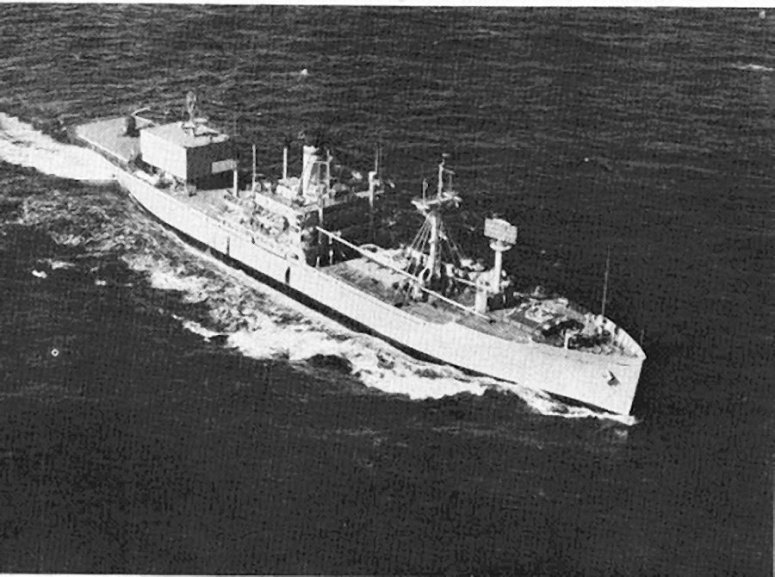
- USNS Haiti Victory (T-AK-238)

History

United States
- Name: Haiti Victory
- Namesake: Haiti
- Owner: War Shipping Administration
- Operator: Waterman Steamship Company
- Ordered: as type (VC2-S-AP3) hull, MCV hull 532
- Builder: Permanente Metals Corporation, Richmond, California
- Yard number: Yard No. 1
- Laid down: 24 April 1944
- Launched: 20 July 1944
- Completed: 18 September 1944
- Acquired: 14 April 1948, by the US Army Transportation Service
- Commissioned: date unknown, as USAT Haiti Victory
- Decommissioned: 1 March 1950
- In service: 1 March 1950, with MSTS as USNS Haiti Victory (T-AK-238)
- Out of service: date unknown
- Renamed: January 1961, USNS Longview (T-AGM-3)
- Fate: Rebuilt to Longview for US Navy

United States
- Name: Longview
- Owner: US Navy
- Acquired: 1961 US Navy
- In service: 1 March 1950, with MSTS
- Out of service: date unknown
- Renamed: January 1961, USNS Longview (T-AGM-3)
- Reclassified: 27 November 1960, Missile Range Instrumentation Ship
- Stricken: date unknown
- Identification: Hull symbol: T-AK-238; Hull symbol: T-AGM-3; IMO number: 7517442
- Fate: Sold for scrapping, 27 April 1976, to American Ship Dismantlers

General characteristics
- Class & type: Greenville Victory-class cargo ship (1945-1960); Longview-class missile range instrumentation ship (1960-)
- Displacement: 4,512 metric tons (4,441 long tons) (standard); 15,589 metric tons (15,343 long tons) (full load)
- Length: 455 ft (139 m)
- Beam: 62 ft (19 m)
- Draft: 29 ft 2 in (8.89 m)
- Installed power: 6,000 shp (4,500 kW)
- Propulsion: 1 × Westinghouse turbine; 2 × Babcock & Wilcox header-type boilers, 525psi 750°; double Westinghouse Main Reduction Gears; 1 × shaft
- Speed: 15.5 knots (28.7 km/h; 17.8 mph)
- Complement: 12 Officers; 87 Enlisted
- Armament: 1 × 5 in (130 mm)/38 caliber dual purpose gun (Haiti); 1 × 3 in (76 mm)/50 caliber dual purpose gun (Haiti); 8 × 20 mm (0.79 in) Oerlikon cannons anti-aircraft gun mounts (Haiti); none as AGM
- Aviation facilities: Helicopter deck added 1961; 2 × Hangars added 1961

SS Haiti Victory (T-AGM-238) was originally built and operated as Greenville class cargo Victory ship which operated as a cargo carrier in both the Atlantic Ocean and the Pacific Ocean during World War II .

In 1960 she was renamed USNS Longview (T-AGM-3) Longview-class missile range instrumentation ship and converted to use as a missile tracking ship which operated in the Pacific Ocean Western Test Range until she was placed out of service and eventually disposed of.

== Construction ==
Haiti Victory (T-AK 238) was laid down under U.S. Maritime Commission contract by Permanente Metals Corporation, Richmond, California, 24 April 1944, under the Emergency Shipbuilding program. She was launched on 20 July. She was sponsored by Mrs. Lucius Booner; and delivered to the War Shipping Administration (WSA) on 18 September.

== World War II commercial operation ==
The ship's United States Maritime Commission designation was VC2- S- AP3. During World War II she operated as a merchantman and was chartered to Waterman Steamship Company.

== Acquired by the Navy as a cargo carrier ==
Acquired by the Navy 1 March 1950, Haiti Victory was assigned to the Military Sea Transportation Service (MSTS), as a Greenville Victory-class cargo ship, for cargo operations in the Atlantic Ocean. From 1950 to 1957, sailing from New York City, she made cargo runs to Northern Europe, the Mediterranean, and the Caribbean. On 6 May 1953, she collided with the British ferry Duke of York, shearing off the ferry's bow, and resulting in the deaths of six passengers.

On 15 June 1957, Haiti Victory sailed on her first MSTS cruise to the Pacific Ocean. Steaming via the U.S. West Coast, the veteran cargo ship arrived Pusan, Korea, 1 August. Following several Far East cruises, she resumed operations in the Atlantic in July 1958. Departing New York 11 July she steamed for the Eastern Mediterranean to support United States peacekeeping efforts in Lebanon. Units of the U.S. 6th Fleet had landed U.S. Marines at request of Lebanese President Chamoun who wished to prevent a coup against his regime by communist oriented insurgents.

While operating in the Mideast, she twice steamed through the Suez Canal, for cargo runs to Karachi, Pakistan. Returning to New York 3 January 1959, Haiti Victory made another Mediterranean cruise prior to assignment in the Pacific. Arriving San Francisco, California, 4 April she operated off the West Coast until sailing for Hawaii 3 months later.

== Conversion to missile support ==
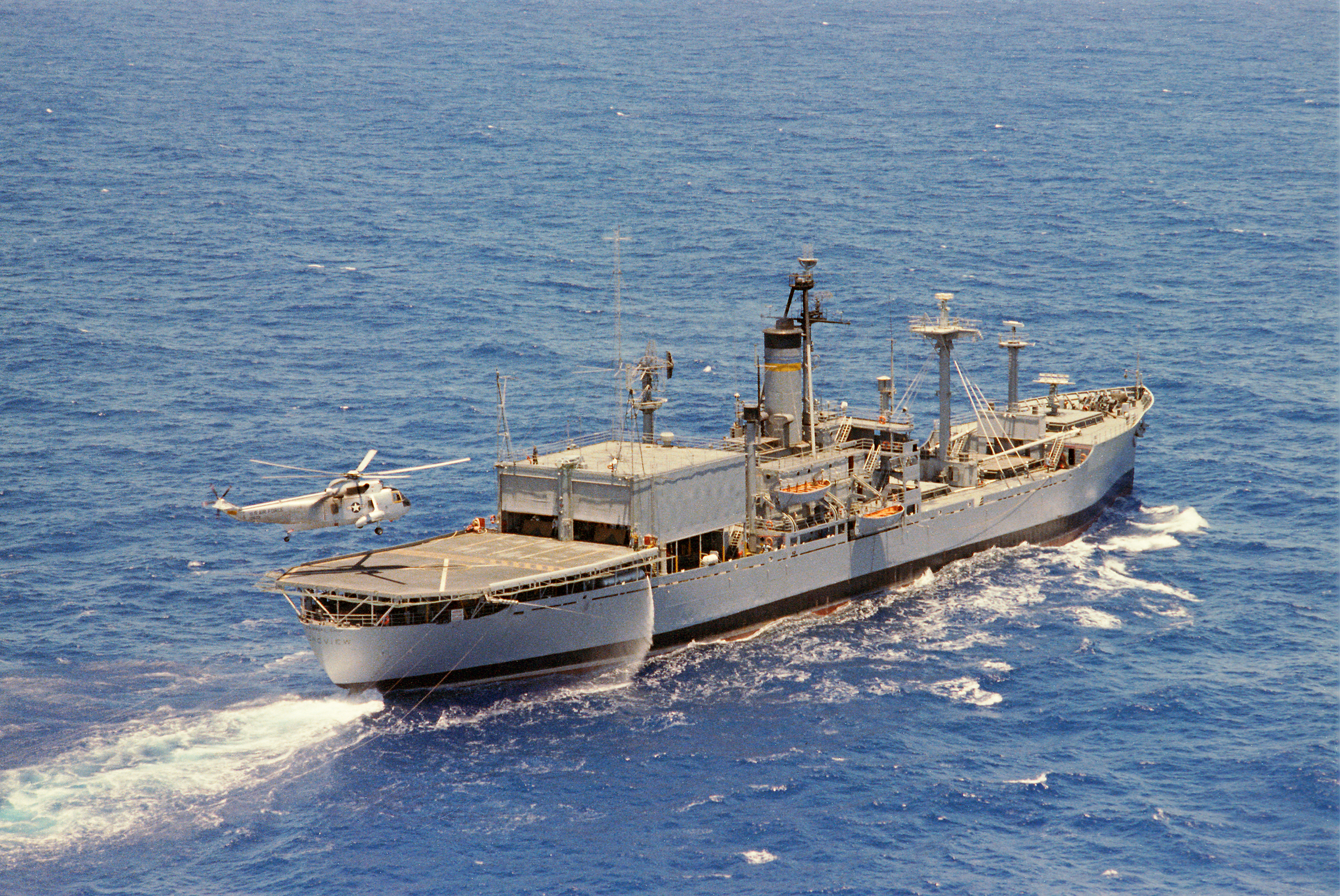
USNS Longview with helicopter landing aft

Arriving Pearl Harbor 3 July, she underwent conversion and training for a role in America's young space program.

Haiti Victory found a place in history, when she became the first ship to recover a space vehicle from orbit. On 11 August 1960, her helicopter retrieved a 300-pound capsule that was launched into orbit the previous day by a Thor-Agena rocket as part of the Central Intelligence Agency's Corona spy satellite project.

Haiti Victory was renamed Longview and re-classified T-AGM-3 on 27 November 1960. She continued operations in the Pacific Missile Range supporting the United States space program, performing a variety of scientific duties for the U.S. Air Force Western Test Range.

The Longview was lead ship in the new class, Longview-class missile range instrumentation ship, two other ships followed in this new class the USNS Private Joe E. Mann (T-AK-253) and the USNS Dalton Victory (T-AK-256).

== Final disposition ==
Longview was transferred to the U.S. Maritime Administration (MARAD) for lay up in the National Defense Reserve Fleet, and on 27 April 1976 was sold for scrapping to American Ship Dismantlers.

== Honors ==
She earned the National Defense Service Medal for the Korean War.

== See also ==
- Missile Range Instrumentation Ship
- List of Victory ships
- Liberty ship
- Type C1 ship
- Type C2 ship
- Type C3 ship
- USNS Dalton Victory (T-AK-256)
