= USNS Comet =

US vehicle landing ship

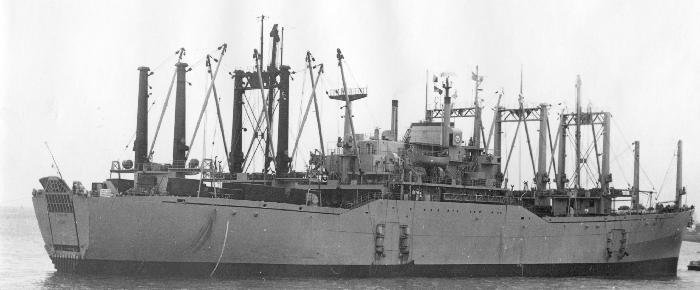
- USNS Comet underway, date and place unknown.

History

United States
- Name: USNS Comet (T-AK-269); USNS Comet (T-LSV-7); USNS Comet (T-AKR-7); SS Comet (T-AKR-7)
- Builder: Sun Shipbuilding and Dry Dock Company
- Launched: 31 July 1957
- Identification: IMO number: 8450665
- Fate: Scrapped 28 September 2015

General characteristics
- Displacement: 8,175 long tons (8,306 t) light; 18,286 long tons (18,579 t) full
- Length: 467 ft (142 m)
- Beam: 78 ft (24 m)
- Draft: 27 ft (8.2 m)
- Propulsion: Two steam turbines, twin shafts
- Speed: average 25 knots (46 km/h; 29 mph)
- Armament: M16 rifles, and M2 50caliber machine gun pintle mounts welded to the railing by Marines of 4th Landing Support Battalion.

USNS Comet (T-AK-269), later T-LSV-7, later T-AKR-7, later SS Comet, was a vehicle landing ship built for the United States Navy. The lone ship of her class, she was named for the comet, and was the fourth U.S. Naval vessel to bear the name.

Comet was laid down 31 July 1957 under Maritime Administration contract (MA hull 42) at Sun Shipbuilding and Dry Dock Company of Chester, Pennsylvania; launched 31 July 1957; delivered to the Navy 27 January 1958; and placed in service under control of the Military Sealift Command (MSC) as cargo ship USNS Comet (T-AK-269).

Redesignated vehicle landing ship T-LSV-7 on 1 January 1963; further redesignated vehicle cargo ship /Roll-on/roll-off ship AKR-7 (date unknown), as such becoming one of the first ship in the world to be specifically designed for loading, shipping and discharge of Roll-on/roll-off cargoes.

Her title was transferred to MARAD, she was redesignated SS Comet and laid up in the National Defense Reserve Fleet, Suisun Bay, Benicia, California as a member of the MARAD Ready Reserve Force (RRF).

Reactivated in 2003 to ferry US Marine Engineers (12 Marines) and equipment from San Diego to Kuwait, with stops in Guam and Dubai/UAE in preparation for the Iraqi conflict (2003–present).

Removed from MSC control, withdrawn from the RRF by reassignment to the National Defense Reserve Fleet 28 July 2006. In 2014, the Maritime Administration submitted a docket for disposing of the ship from the National Defense Reserve Fleet.

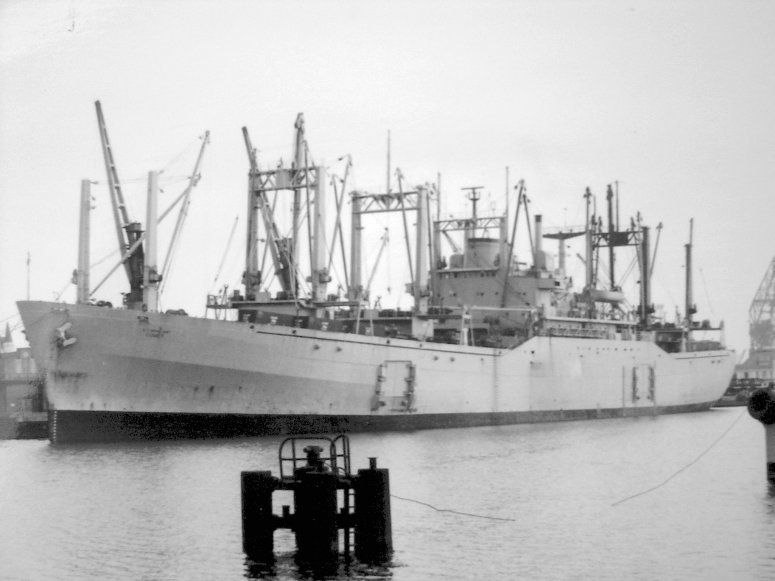
USNS Comet moored pierside at Bremerhaven, Germany, April 1976.

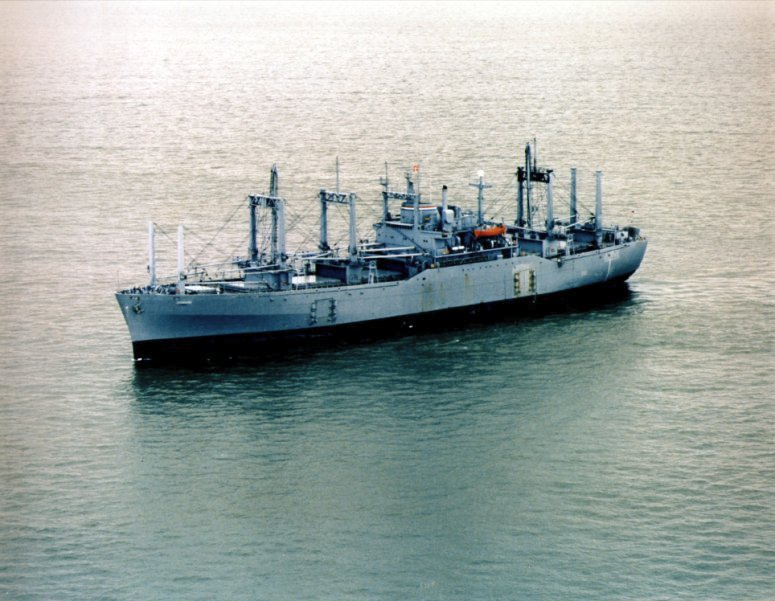
USNS Comet at sea, date and location unknown.
