= Dimitri Chandris =

Greek shipping businessman

- Portrait of Dimitri Chandris
- Born: Dimitri John Chandris; 1921; Chios, Greece
- Died: 1980 (aged 58–59); London, United Kingdom
- Resting place: Kambos, Chios, Greece
- Citizenship: Greek
- Occupations: Shipping tycoon; businessman
- Spouse: Myrto Pnevmaticou
- Children: John Chandris; Michael Chandris

Dimitri John Chandris (Greek: Δημήτρης Ιωάννη Χανδρής; born January 1921 – August 1980) was a Greek shipowner who established Chandris Line, a large passenger shipping line, with his brother Anthony Chandris. Dimitri Chandris was the eldest son of John D. Chandris, a prominent Greek shipowner.

== Early life ==
Dimitri Chandris was born in Chios to a wealthy family, son of Ioannis D. Chandris, a prominent ship-owner, and his wife Evgenia. In 1915 John Chandris had purchased his first ship, Dimitrios, and founded Chandris.

After the outbreak of World War II, Dimitri Chandris relocated from Chios to London with his family, joining a large number of other ship-owning families from Greece. The UK government requisitioned all of his ships for war service.

== Post War ==
At the end of the war Dimitri set about reconstructing the family business almost from scratch. He chose to remain in the UK as, although the Second World War had ended, Greece was embroiled in a civil war. Greek shipowners, therefore, elected to operate in either of the then two great maritime centres of London and New York.

In 1950 he was elected on to the Board of the Union of Greek Shipowners. He also served as their vice president from 1960 to 1964. (His brother Anthony later served as the president).

In the 1960s and 1970s he was active with various business interests in Greece including the establishment of the Alpha beer brewery (which became the second largest in Greece), a large motor franchise based on Rootes cars, and a substantial hotel group. He was also involved in several charities including establishment of the School of Maritime Engineering in his home island of Chios.

== Shipping career ==
Before the outbreak of World War II, Chandris operated six ships: the passenger ships Dimitrios, Chimara and Corte II, and the steamships Dimitrios II, Vlassios and Eugenia. In the years after 1945, Dimitri and Anthony Chandris began to develop Chandris into the largest Greek passenger shipping firm.

In 1945 Dimitri Chandris led the acquisition of Charlton Steam Shipping Company Ltd., which operated a fleet of passenger ships from headquarters in Newcastle. This purchase signalled the beginning of the Chandris Group's concentrated expansion efforts around passenger travel. Recognising the urgent need to provide passenger ships for displaced peoples and refugees in post-War Europe, the Chandris Group purchased the Prince David and Prince Robert (pictured right) from the Canadian Royal Navy in 1945. Following rebuilding and conversion, the new ships were leased by the Chandris Group to the International Refugee Organisation.

More intensive expansion efforts were undertaken from 1959, after which the Chandris Group acquired several large passenger ships, notably Bloemfontein Castle, Bretagne, and Lurline (later renamed Ellinis).

== Chandris Line ==
In 1950 Dimitri Chandris was elected on to the Board of the Union of Greek Shipowners (UGS), later serving as the organisation's Vice President from 1960 to 1964.

By the 1970s the Chandris Group had developed multifarious activities moving into tankers and tramp ships as well as passenger and cruise ships. By 1976 Chandris had the largest passenger-cruise ship fleet in the world, surpassing the records held by major companies such as Cunard and Union-Castle. An editorial feature in Lloyd's Review praised the recovery and renaissance of the Greek shipping sector, led by companies and individuals from Chios, writing: "It is not surprising, therefore, that a name often mentioned with Greek shipping – Chandris – was born in Chios. Nor is it surprising that the most successful passenger ship operator in modern times should be Chandris".

== Death ==
Having lived in London since World War II, Dimitri Chandris returned permanently to Greece in July 1980 to work and focus on the hotel group he established. Shortly following his return to Greece, Dimitri was involved in a boating accident. He was transferred to The London Clinic for medical care but died following an operation. Dimitri was buried in the Chandris family chapel next to the church of Agios Vlasios in Kambos, Chios.

== Other Ventures ==
Outside of shipping, Dimitri Chandris was involved in a number of other business ventures, establishing a large automotive franchise, a brewery and a substantial hotel group.

== See also ==
- Greek shipping
- Chios
- Celebrity Cruises
- John D. Chandris
