= Lurline =

Lurline may refer to:

== Arts and entertainment ==
- Lurline (opera), an 1860 opera by William Vincent Wallace
- Queen Lurline, a character in the Oz books by L. Frank Baum
- "Lurline", a poem by Henry Kendall
- "Lurline", the Mask and Wig Club's first annual production in 1889

== People ==
- Lurline Champagnie (born 1935 or 1936), English politician
- Lizzie Lurline Collier (1893–1986), commonly referred to as Lurline Collier, American home demonstration agent and teacher
- Lurline Hook (1915–1986), Australian diver
- Lurline Uller (1918–2012), American actress and dancer
- Lurline Wailana McGregor, American writer, filmmaker, administrator and paddler
- Lurline Matson Roth (1890–1985), American heiress, equestrian and philanthropist

== Ships ==
- Lurline (1878 sternwheeler), a steamboat on the Columbia River from 1878 to 1930
- Lurline (brigantine), built by Matthew Turner in 1887
- SS Lurline, various 20th-21st century Matson Navigation Company ships

== See also ==
- Lurline Baths, in San Francisco
- Lurleen (disambiguation)
