= SS American Star =

SS American Star may refer to the following ships:

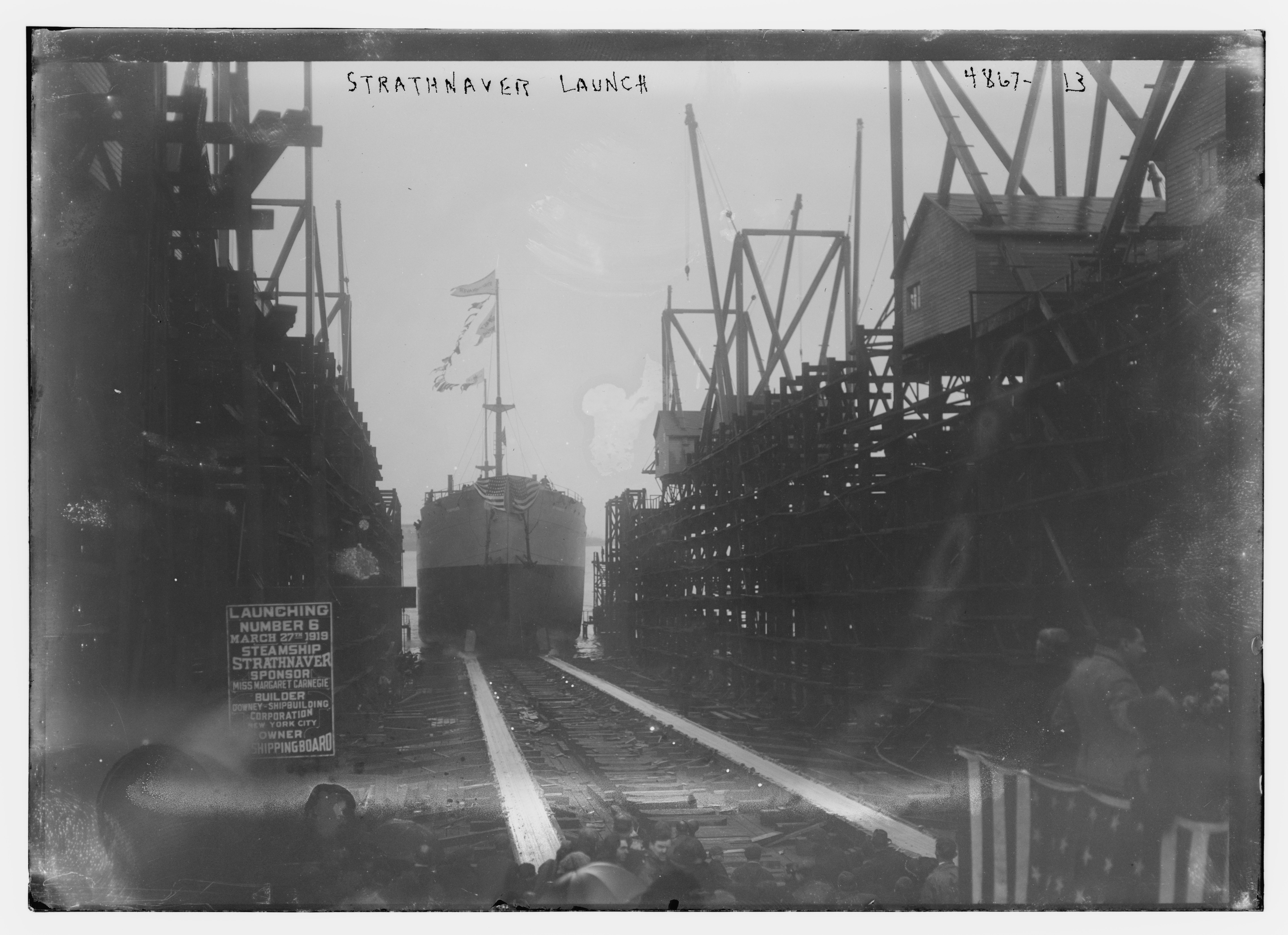
Launch of SS Strathnaver, March 27, 1919

- SS American Star (1919), 5,354 GRT EFC Design 1017 ship, ex Strathnaver, completed in 1919 at Downey Shipbuilding, later ship of Red Salmon Canning Company, chartered by U.S. Army in September 1941 for Alaska base buildup. Operated by Alaska Steamship Co. for War Shipping Administration December 1943—1946 when returned to owners.
- SS American Star (1939), ocean liner, American Star after 1994, last of a series of names for the ship.
