= SS Cokesit =

American steam cargo ship

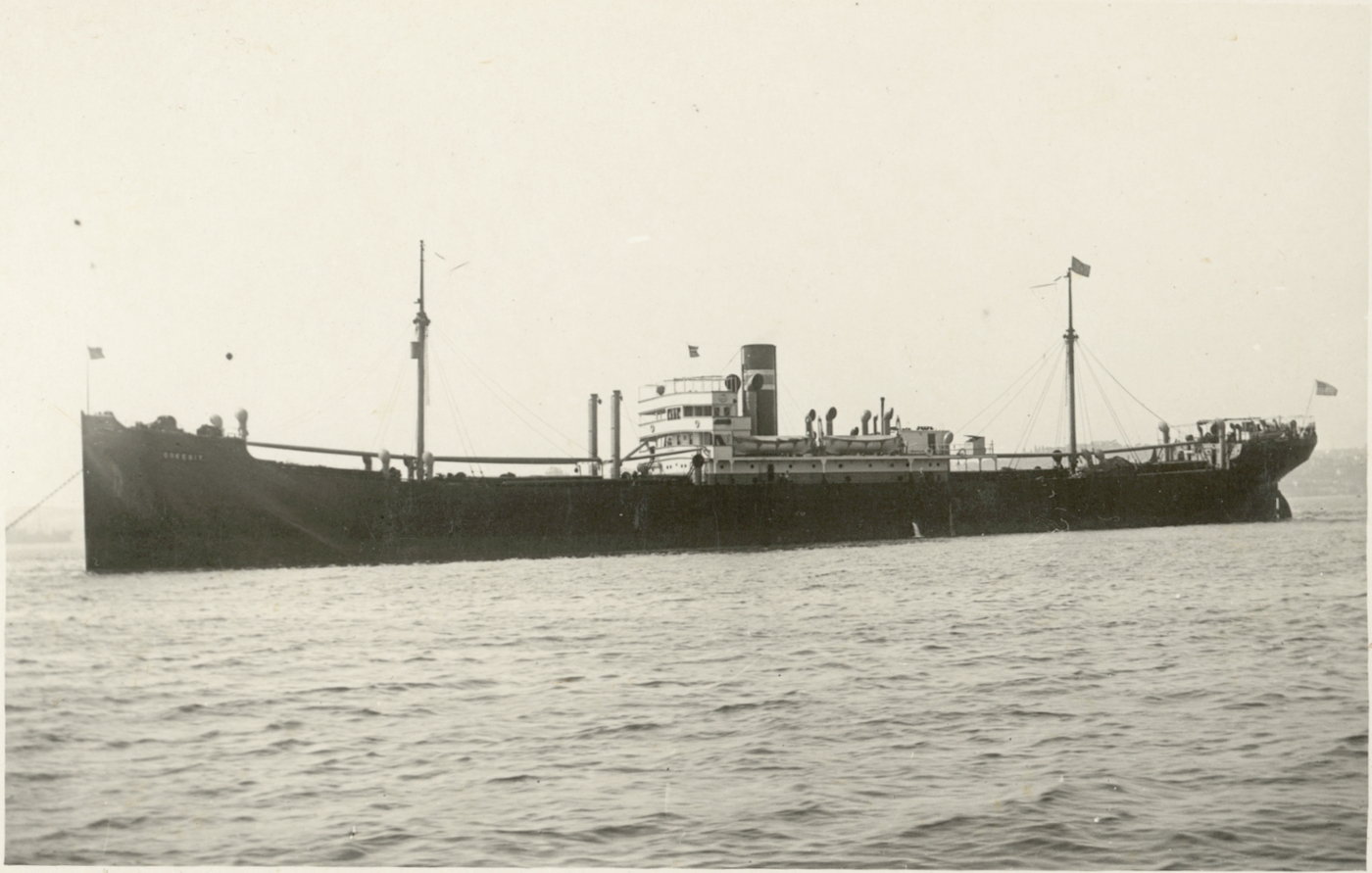

History

United States
- Name: Cokesit (1919–1938); Adelfoi Chandris (1938–1941); Saint Marin (1941–1942); Catania (1942–1943)
- Owner: USSB (1919–1936); MARCOM (1936–1938); John D. Chandris (1938–1940); Vichy Government (1940-1942); Italian Government (1942–1943)
- Operator: Pacific Steamship Co. (May–June 1919); Barber Line (July 1919–July 1920); Lykes Brothers (December 1921–May 1922); U.S.& A. Lines (June 1922–October 1926); Roosevelt Line (November 1926–May 1927); John D. Chandris (1938–1940); Chargeurs Reunis (April 1940–October 1941); Société Nationale d'Affrêtements (October 1941–October 1942); Regia Marina (November 1942–-March 1943); Regio Esercito (1943)
- Ordered: 8 January 1918
- Builder: Guy M. Standifer Construction Co., Vancouver
- Yard number: 1
- Laid down: 3 August 1918
- Launched: 31 December 1918
- Sponsored by: Miss Ruth Standifer
- Commissioned: 17 May 1919
- Maiden voyage: 19 May 1919
- Home port: Seattle (1919-1938); Piraeus (1938-1941)
- Identification: US Official Number 217776; Call sign LQKN (1919-1933); Call sign KJGF(1934-1938); Call sign SVYF(1938-1943)
- Fate: Scuttled, 15 September 1943; Raised and scrapped, 1949

General characteristics
- Type: Design 1015 ship
- Tonnage: 6,176 GRT; 4,401 NRT; 9,426 DWT
- Length: 401.4 ft (122.3 m)
- Beam: 53.2 ft (16.2 m)
- Draft: 26 ft 6 3/4 in (8.096 m) (loaded)
- Depth: 31.9 ft (9.7 m)
- Installed power: 359 Nhp, 2,800 ihp
- Propulsion: Hooven, Owens & Rentschler 3-cylinder triple expansion
- Speed: 11 knots (13 mph; 20 km/h)

Cokesit was a steam cargo ship built in 1918–1919 by Guy M. Standifer Construction Company of Vancouver for the United States Shipping Board as part of the wartime shipbuilding program of the Emergency Fleet Corporation (EFC) to restore the nation's Merchant Marine. The vessel was largely employed on the East Coast of the United States to Australia route until 1928 when she was laid up. In late 1937 the ship together with several other vessels was bid on and subsequently acquired next year by the Greek tramp operator John D. Chandris to carry cargo from Australia to Greece and United Kingdom. The freighter was also renamed Adelfoi Chandris. Following the surrender of France, the ship was interned in Dakar and passed into Vichy government hands in 1940 and renamed Saint Marin. Under the terms of Nevers Agreement she eventually was transferred to Italy and renamed Catania. In early August 1943 the vessel together with several other ships was bombed and damaged in Naples harbor by the Allied aircraft.

== Design and construction ==
After the United States entry into World War I, a large shipbuilding program was undertaken to restore and enhance shipping capabilities both of the United States and their Allies. As part of this program, EFC placed orders with nation's shipyards for a large number of vessels of standard designs. Design 1015 cargo ship was a standard cargo freighter of approximately 9,400 tons deadweight designed by Moore Shipbuilding Co. and adopted by USSB.

Cokesit was part of the order for 10 vessels placed by USSB with Guy M. Standifer Construction Co. on 8 January 1918 and was laid down on 3 August 1918 and launched on 31 December 1918 (yard number 1), with Miss Ruth Standifer, sister of Guy M. Standifer, principal owner of the G. M. Standifer Construction Co., being the sponsor. Due to the ship being the first vessel launched by a newly established yard, there was a large crowd in attendance consisting of common folk and local dignitaries. Just as with many other vessels being built for the Shipping Board, her name was picked by Mrs. Woodrow Wilson who often chose Native American words for naming purposes.

The ship had two main decks as well as forecastle and poop deck and was built on the Isherwood principle of longitudinal framing providing extra strength to the body of the vessel. The freighter had five main holds and also possessed all the modern machinery for quick loading and unloading of cargo from five large hatches, including ten winches and a large number of derricks. She was also equipped with wireless apparatus, had submarine signal system installed and had electrical lights installed along the decks.

As built, the ship was 401.4 feet (122.3 m) long (between perpendiculars) and 53.2 feet (16.2 m) abeam, a depth of 31.9 feet (9.7 m). Cokesit was originally assessed at 6,176 GRT and 4,401 NRT and had deadweight of approximately 9,627. The vessel had a steel hull with double bottom throughout with exception of her machine compartment, and a single 2,800 ihp triple expansion steam engine, with cylinders of 24 1/2-inch (62 cm), 41 1/2-inch (105 cm) and 72-inch (180 cm) diameter with a 48-inch (120 cm) stroke, that drove a single screw propeller and moved the ship at up to 11 knots (13 mph; 20 km/h). The steam for the engine was supplied by three single-ended Scotch marine boilers fitted for both coal and oil fuel.

The sea trials were held on the Columbia River on 16 April 1919 during which the ship could easily maintain an average speed of 11 1/2 knots (13.2 mph; 21.3 km/h) on several runs over a measured distance, half a knot above her contract speed. Following their successful completion, the ship was turned over to the USSB two weeks later.

== Operational history ==
While the steamer was still under construction she was allocated by the USSB to Pacific Steamship Company to transport flour to the East Coast for delivery to Europe. Following an established USSB policy the Shipping Board ship could only continue with cargo to Europe if an equivalent amount of cargo space would be allocated by a foreign shipping operator. After finishing her test trial, the freighter was put back into shipbuilder's yard for minor repairs and painting. She then moved to an elevator where she took on board 7,525 tons of flour and cleared from loading area on May 16. Cokesit then proceeded on a twelve-hour long loaded trail run arriving at Astoria next day at around noon. The vessel finally sailed out on May 19 and arrived at Hampton Roads via the Panama Canal on June 17 where she unloaded her entire cargo of flour. Soon after she was reallocated to Barber Line and proceeded to Savannah where she loaded 6,085 bales of cotton in addition to other cargo and departed for Liverpool and Glasgow on August 22. Cokesit returned to Newport News from her European trip on November 14 and from there proceeded to Tampa on December 15 to load a full cargo of phosphate rock for delivery to Denmark. The freighter made one more voyage for Barber Line in May 1920 carrying a mixed cargo of cotton and phosphates to Le Havre and Ghent and returning to Newport News on July 8. She then remained berthed at Hampton Roads until being chartered for one trip to France and departing with 6,611 tons of coal for Dunkirk on 29 October 1920. She returned to Savannah from her trip in mid-December of the same year and remained idle there for an entire 1921.

In December 1921 Cokesit was allocated to Lykes Brothers to serve on their trade route from Galveston to French and German ports and departed Savannah on 6 January 1922 bound for New Orleans. She sailed from there on January 26 for Rotterdam carrying a cargo of grain and lumber. She made one more trip in April 1922 to Bremen with a cargo of 85,731 bushels of rye before being withdrawn from Gulf service in May 1922 due to her being a coal-burning vessel and her inability to hold enough coal to make a round trip voyage to Europe.

Upon her return from Europe in June 1922 Cokesit was assigned to the United States & Australia Line to operate between New York and Australian, New Zealand and other Oriental ports. The freighter departed New York on her first trip on the new route on 29 July 1922 carrying full cargo of case oil. She called at Port Natal on September 3 to refill her bunkers, and arrived at Fremantle on September 28. The freighter then visited several ports in Australia unloading her cargo and sailed from Newcastle in ballast on November 6 bound for the Philippines and China. After loading approximately 6,500 tons of general cargo largely consisting of sugar at Cebu, Pulupandan, Manila and Shanghai the freighter arrived at Boston via Comox and Panama Canal on 4 March 1923 and from there proceeded to New York, Philadelphia and Baltimore to unload the freight. Subsequently, she proceeded to James River on July 23 where she was laid up.

Cokesit was reactivated at the end of 1924 and arrived at New York for loading on 8 December 1924. She was again allocated to the United States & Australia Line and sailed from New York on December 23 bound for Australia. The freighter continue serving the same route through September 1926. Following a return from one of this trips, Cokesit was allocated to Roosevelt Line to serve on the newly inaugurated route from East Coast to Australia. The ship made only one trip in this capacity leaving New York in November 1926 and returning to Boston on 1 April 1927 with a large cargo of wool, hides and cocoa. She was scheduled to depart for another trip on July 20 of the same year but that trip never happened and the ship remained idle waiting for another opportunity. Cokesit was eventually laid up and relocated to a ship anchorage off Staten Island.

After being laid up for approximately nine years Cokesit was designated for sale and disposal in 1936. However, in October 1937 the U.S. Maritime Commission offered a large number of vessels in their reserve fleet for sale and Greek shipowner John D. Chandris stepped in and inquired about buying four large vessels off this list. These steamers, Arcturus, Cokesit, Oakspring and Rockport, were cleared by the Maritime Commission for sale to a foreign entity and were acquired by the Greek firm for US$367,536 the same month. Cokesit was renamed Adelfoi Chandris and was immediately put on the company's trade routes in the Baltic and the Mediterranean. The vessel remained in this trade through the entire 1938. Early in 1939 the freighter was chartered for one trip to Australia and New Zealand and departed from Sfax with a cargo of Gafsa phosphates on 11 February 1939 bound for Auckland and New Plymouth. After unloading her cargo in New Zealand the ship continued on to Sydney where she took on board 8,602 tons of wheat and left on 3 June 1939 bound for United Kingdom and Greece. She arrived in England in early September 1939, and due to the start of World War II could no longer be used in the Baltic trade. The ship then proceeded to North America arriving in Vancouver in January 1940.

While in British Columbia Adelfoi Chandris loaded approximately 8,000 tons of lead and lumber and departed New Westminster on 19 February 1940, passed through the Panama Canal on March 3 and arrived in Halifax in mid-March. While there, Adelfoi Chandris was made part of convoy HX 29 and sailed from Halifax on 21 March 1940 for Liverpool successfully reaching her destination on April 4. On 23 April 1940 while still at Garston the ship was seized by the French government and put under control of Chargeurs Reunis. The freighter then proceeded to Barry in ballast as part of convoy OB 136 arriving there on April 28. Following the surrender of France the vessel left England and eventually ended up at Dakar on August 8 where she was interned and remained berthed. On 21 October 1941 the vessel was transferred to Société Nationale d'Affrêtements (SNA) and renamed Saint Marin. She continued her stay at Dakar undergoing repairs from October 1941 through February 1942 before sailing for Marseille where she underwent further repairs from 5 March through 15 April 1942.

Under the terms of Nevers Agreement signed between the Nazi Germany and the Vichy Government on 27/28 August 1942 all foreign merchant ships in French custody were to be transferred to Germany. On 23 October 1942 Saint Marin was restored to their former Greek owners under her original name and simultaneously transferred to Italy and put under control of Società Anonima di Navigazione Italia under a name Catania. On 12 November 1942 the vessel was requisitioned by Regia Marina and remained in their service until 3 March 1943 when the ship charter was annulled. The vessel subsequently was chartered by Regio Esercito and remained under their control until the end of her career. On 4 August 1943 she was heavily damaged during an Allied air raid on Naples. She was further damaged during another air raid on 8 September 1943, and was finally scuttled by the retreating German troops on 15 September 1943 a few days before arrival of Allies in Naples. In 1947, the ship was raised. Italy was allowed to scrap the wreckage in 1949.
