= SS Amerikanis =

Greek cruise ship, formerly a steam turbine ocean liner

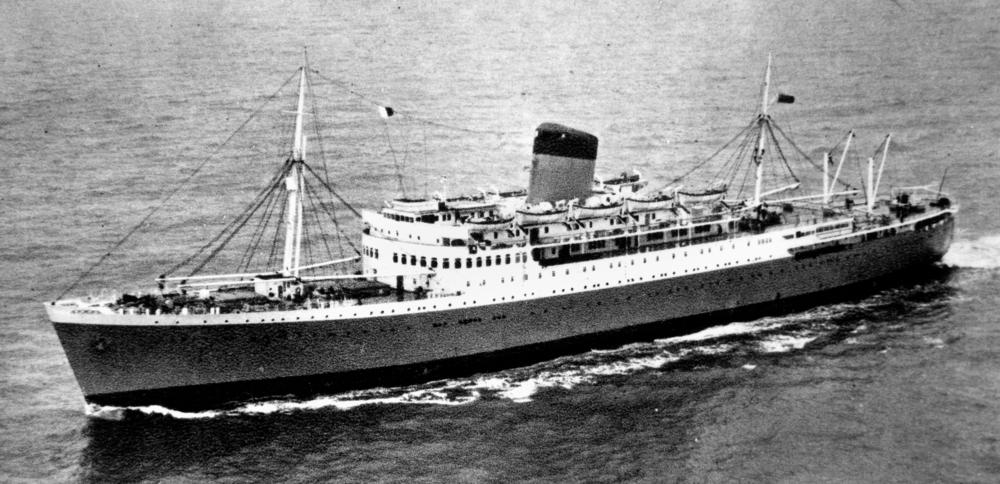
- The ship in her mid-1960s form as Kenya Castle

History

United Kingdom
- Name: Kenya Castle
- Owner: Union-Castle Line (1952–67)
- Operator: Union-Castle Line (1952–67)
- Port of registry: London, United Kingdom
- Builder: Harland & Wolff, Belfast, Northern Ireland
- Yard number: 1432
- Launched: 21 June 1951
- Completed: February 1952
- Maiden voyage: March 1952
- Renamed: 1967
- Identification: Call sign: GNCF; IMO number: 5185398
- Fate: Sold

Greece
- Name: Amerikanis
- Owner: Chandris Lines (1967–2000)
- Operator: Chandris Lines (1967–80); Costa Cruises (1980–84); Chandris Lines (1984–96)
- Port of registry: Piraeus, Greece
- Acquired: 1967
- Renamed: Amerikani (2001)
- Identification: IMO number: 5185398
- Fate: Scrapped in Alang, India, 2001

General characteristics
- Tonnage: 19,904 GRT
- Length: 576 ft (176 m)
- Beam: 74 ft 3 in (22.63 m)
- Draft: 26 ft 6 in (8.08 m)
- Decks: 8
- Speed: 17.5 knots (32.4 km/h; 20.1 mph) (service speed)
- Capacity: 920 (from 1967)
- Crew: 400

Amerikanis, formerly Kenya Castle, was a UK-built steam turbine ocean liner that became a Greek-owned cruise ship.

== Building ==
Harland & Wolff built Kenya Castle in Belfast, Northern Ireland, completing her in 1952 for the Union-Castle Line of London, England. She had one-class accommodation for about 530 passengers, and considerable refrigerated and general cargo capacity. She was the second of a trio of sister ships built between 1950 and 1953, the others being Rhodesia Castle and Braemar Castle.

== Passenger and cargo service to Africa ==
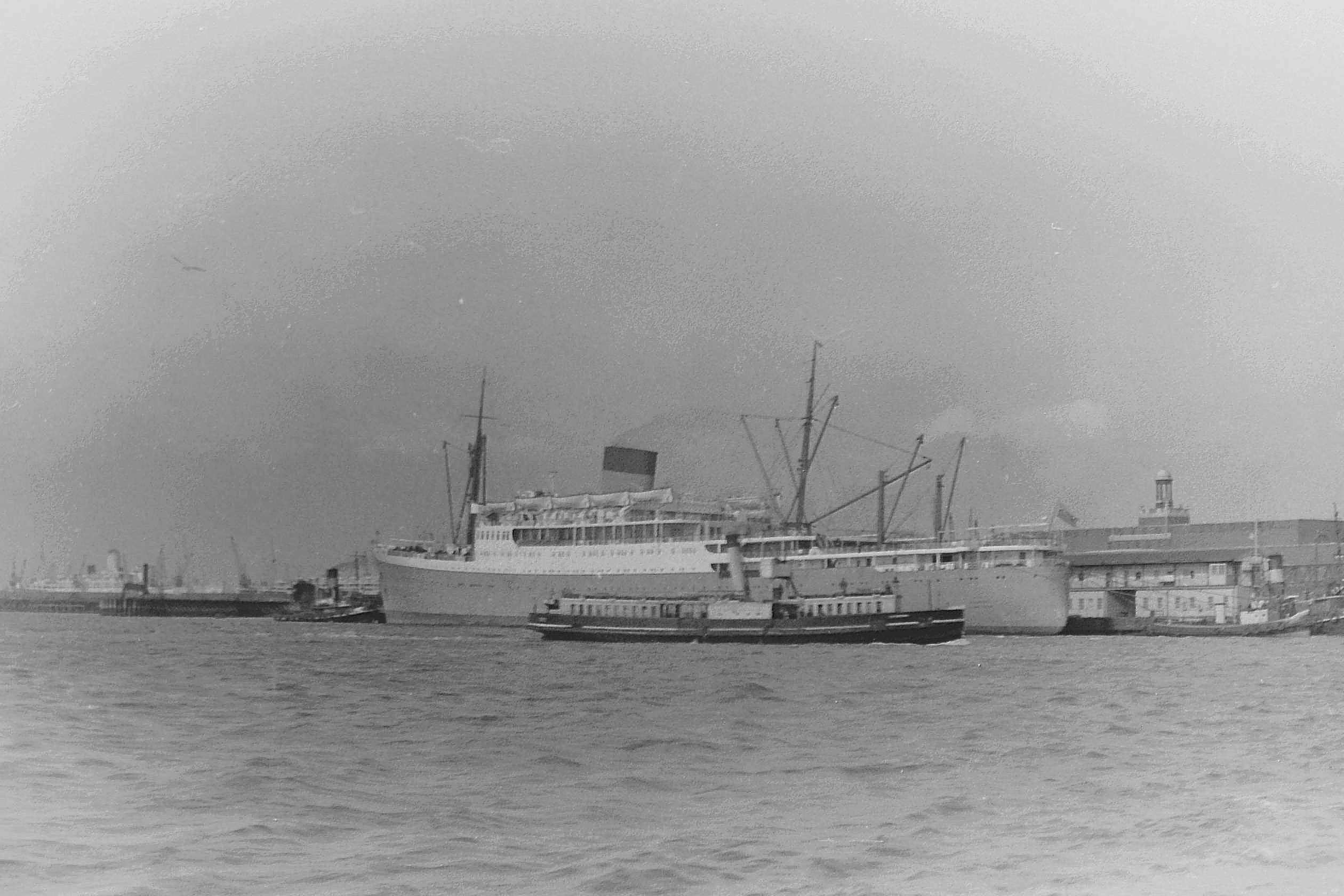
Kenya Castle with original funnel and deck lines

Kenya Castle began service on Union-Castle's route around Africa from London in March 1952. However, by 1962, due to dwindling patronage, the voyages were terminated at Durban, South Africa. Kenya Castle and her sister ships then retraced their (now all eastward) journeys back to Britain via the Suez Canal.

During an early 1960s refit the passenger complement was reduced to 446, while technical upgrades included the ship's funnel being raised by the fitting of a streamlined, ventilated dome.

Faced with continual decline in demand for its services, Union-Castle withdrew all three sister ships from the Africa trade in 1965–67, each vessel having operated for around 15 years. Kenya Castle was laid up in the River Blackwater, Essex in early 1967, while her sisters went for scrap.

== Conversion and cruising career ==
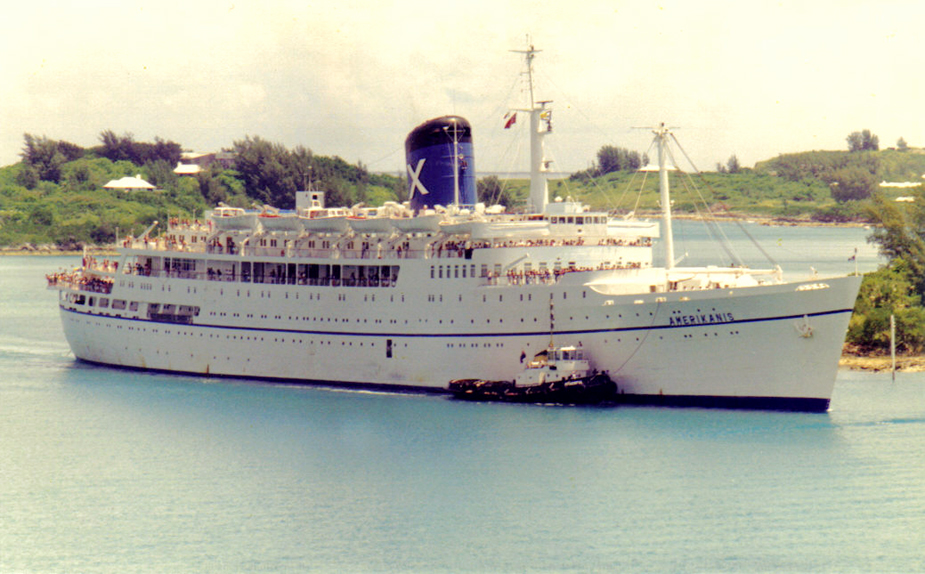
Amerikanis in Bermuda, 1987

In July 1967 the Chandris shipping family (now Celebrity Cruises), bought Kenya Castle and renamed her Amerikanis ("American maiden"). She went to Greece to be refitted as a full-time cruise ship. Her cargo holds were replaced with additional cabins, increasing passenger capacity to about 920. She became known for being the first passenger ship to have a television in every cabin. All public rooms were refurbished in contemporary European style. Her hull was repainted white. Other than the removal of cargo handling gear, Amerikanis retained much of her original profile.

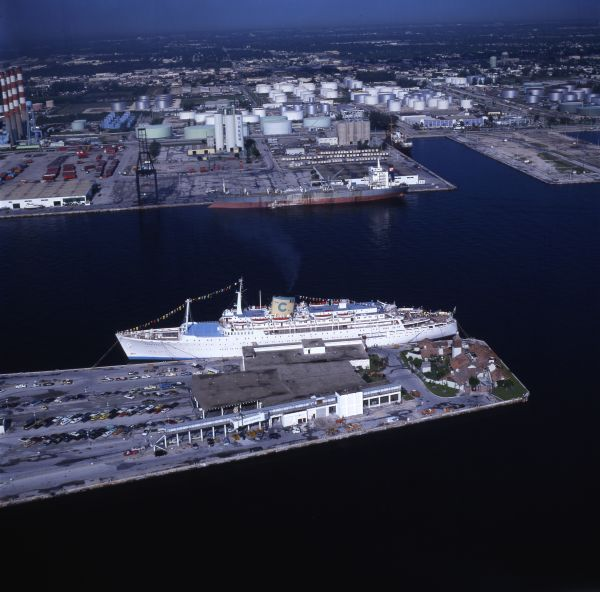
Amerikanis in her Costa Line livery

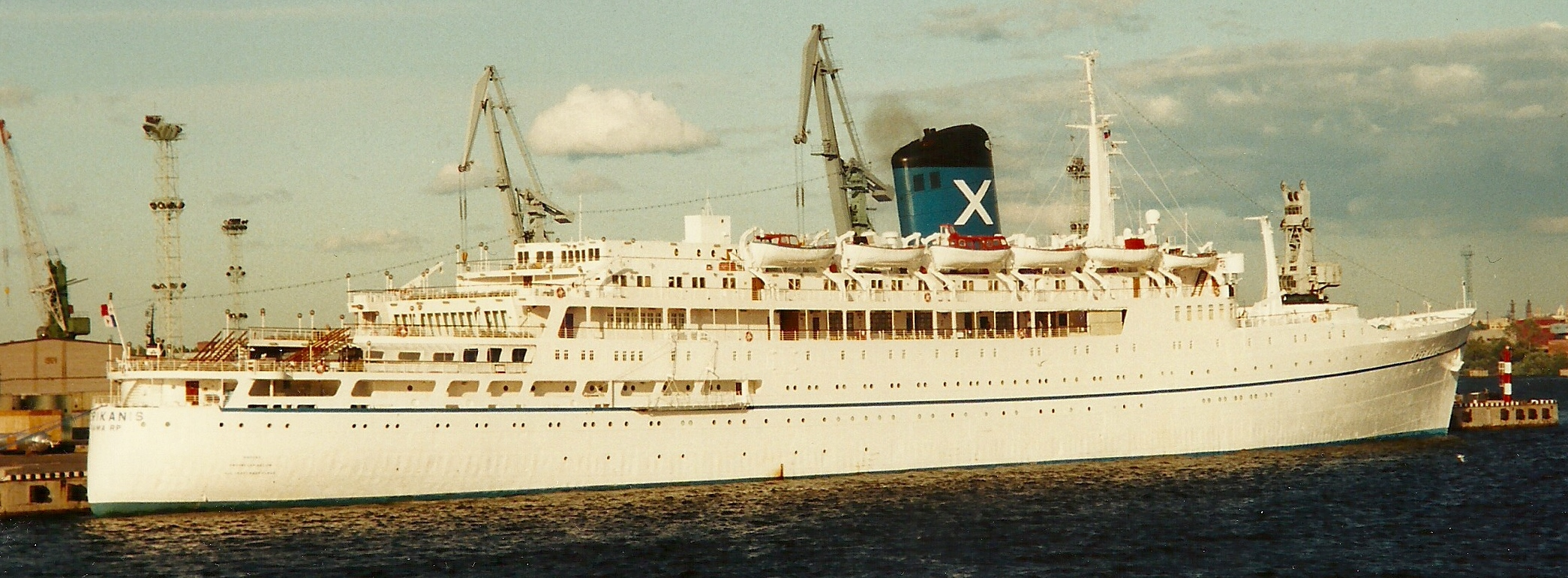
Amerikanis in Saint Petersburg

While intended to work trans-Atlantic cruises in her first season, delays to her refit caused Amerikanis to go directly into an autumn 1968 programme between New York and Bermuda. She later moved to the Caribbean, based at Puerto Rico for the northern winter and operating Mediterranean Sea cruises in the summer. Retaining her name, Amerikanis was leased to the Italian operators Costa Cruises (vessel remained owned by Chandris) from 1980 to 1984. For this charter her funnel was re-painted yellow with Costa's trademark blue "C". After regaining the distinctive white Chandris "X" ("Ch" – for Chandris – in the Greek alphabet) on her blue funnel, Amerikanis served for another 12 years.

== Disposal ==
In 1996 Amerikanis was laid up in Greece while decisions were made about her future. Nothing materialized and she was sold for scrap in 2001, arriving at Alang breakers yard in India, on 12 June 2001.
