= Lurleen =

Lurleen may refer to:

- Lurleen Wallace (1926–1968), Governor of Alabama and wife of George Wallace
- Lurleen Lumpkin, a recurring character on The Simpsons television series
- Lake Lurleen, Alabama

== See also ==
- Lurlene McDaniel (born 1944), American novelist
- Lurline (disambiguation)
