= Chandris Line =

Defunct Greece-based shipping company

- Chandris Line Poster (1960s) announced his new flagship RHMS Australis
- Industry: Passenger Transportation; Cruises
- Founded: 1960
- Founder: Antonios Chandris
- Defunct: 1996
- Fate: Dissolved
- Successor: Celebrity Cruises (Royal Caribbean International)
- Headquarters: Athens, Greece
- Area served: Worldwide
- Subsidiaries: Celebrity Cruises

Chandris Line was a Greek shipping company founded in 1960 by Antonios Chandris to operate ocean liners between Greece and Australia. Initially the company also traded under the names Greek Australian Line, National Greek Australian Line and Europe-Australia Line.

Following a period of expansion, in 1974 Chandris Line merged with Chandris Cruises—a separate company founded in 1960 by Antonios Chandris' brother Dimitri Chandris to operate cruises in the Mediterranean—to form Chandris Line Chandris Cruises. After 1977 the company concentrated solely on cruising and was rebranded Chandris Cruises. In 1985 Chandris Cruises acquired Fantasy Cruises, and subsequently their North American operations were rebranded as Chandris Fantasy Cruises. The company ceased trading in 1996. The funnels of all of their ships were emblazoned with the Greek letter chi, the first letter of the name Chandris in Greek (Χανδρή). The chi acted as a logo for both Chandris and their subsidiary and ultimate successor, Celebrity Cruises.

== History ==
=== 1960–1974 ===
==== Chandris Line ====
In 1959 Antonios J. Chandris, son of the Greek freight shipping company owner John D. Chandris, decided to establish a new passenger shipping company to carry migrants from Europe to Australia. Together with his brother Dimitri Chandris, Antonios Chandris had previously been involved in Charlton Steam Shipping Company's failed migrant service in the 1940s, but now wanted to attempt entering the migrant trade again. In October 1959 Antonios Chandris purchased RMS Bloemfontein Castle from Union-Castle Line for £1.5 million as the first ship of the new Chandris Line. Following delivery to Chandris Line on 19 November 1959 the Bloemfontein Castle was renamed Patris and rebuilt with increased passenger capacity for migrant service. Antonios Chandris made two contracts to increase the profitability of the ship: with the Intergovernmental Committee on European Migration to carry assisted migrants from Europe to Australia; and with the Greek Government to carry mail from Greece to Australia. As a result, the Patris gained the right to use the Royal Hellenic Mail Ship (RHMS) ship prefix, therefore becoming known as RHMS Patris. Following rebuilding the Patris first departed Piraeus with Captain Zannis X.Xenios, on 14 December 1959, arriving in Fremantle, Australia on 2 January 1960 and her final Australian destination, Sydney on 9 January. Initially the Patris’s operator was marketed as Greek-Australian Line, later National Greek-Australian Line.

House flag with Greek letter chi, which was branded onto the funnels of all Chandris ships. In Greek, the name Chandris begins with a chi (Χανδρή).

The Patris proved highly popular on the Greece—Australia service, and in 1960 Chandris Line began looking for a second ship. In November 1960 Chandris Line chartered the Bretagne from Société Générale de Transports Maritimes. During the Northern Hemisphere summer seasons of 1961 and 1962 the ship was chartered to Caribbean Cruise Line for cruises out of New York City, spending the rest of the year in liner service between the United Kingdom and Australia. In April 1962 the Bretagne was renamed RHMS Brittany, but she was destroyed by a fire while in drydock in April 1963. The Brittany's UK-Australia version was marketed as Europe-Australia Line.

In September 1963 Chandris Line acquired the Matson Line ship Lurline as a replacement for the Brittany. Renamed RHMS Ellinis, the ship entered service with Chandris Line on the United Kingdom—Mediterranean—Australia -route in December 1963. A second United States -built liner joined the Chandris Line fleet in November 1964 when America was purchased from the United States Lines. Following rebuilding she entered service with Chandris Line in August 1965 as RHMS Australis, joining Ellinis on the UK-Australia service. The Australis particularly proved to be an extremely popular ship on the run from United Kingdom to Australia, usually operating at full capacity. Chandris Line expanded further in 1965 when they acquired National Hellenic American Line and their sole ship, Queen Frederica, from Home Lines. Although the Queen Frederica was a relatively old ship, Antonios Chandris considered her to be well suited for the North American cruise market. During the summer months she was used for cruising out of New York, while during the winters she was used in Piraeus—New York and Piraeus—Australia liner services. For some time the Queen Frederica was marketed as a Chandris Lines/National Hellenic American Line ship. The Queen Frederica's cruise service from New York proved short, as new legislation came in effect in the US at the end of 1967, aimed at improving safety standards on cruise ships. Bringing the Queen Frederica in-line with the new requirements would have been extremely costly, and as a result she was withdrawn from the North American cruise service in September 1967. As a replacement Chandris Line acquired the former Union-Castle liner RMS Kenya Castle, which was renamed RHMS Amerikanis and entered cruise service for Chandris Line in August 1968.

In 1970 Matson Line offered another of their ships—the second 1932-built Lurline, originally named Monterey and a sister ship to the Ellinis—for sale in 1970, Chandris Line were quick to purchase the ship. Given a large-scale refit in which particular attention was given to dual usage of the ship in both liner and cruise services, the former Lurline emerged in February 1971 as RHMS Britanis, joining Ellinis and Australis on the UK—Australia liner service.

Patris, which had served without interruption on the Greece—Australia service from 1959, was assigned to a new service in 1972 due to declining passenger numbers, offering a much-shortedned liner service from Singapore to Australia, alongside occasional cruises from Australian ports. A similar fate befell Ellinis in 1973, when she was taken off the declining UK-Australia liner service and reassigned for cruising on European waters.

=== 1974–1996: Chandris Cruises ===
With the number of liner passengers between Europe and Australia dwindling, the Britanis was taken off liner service and rerouted to full-time cruising in 1975. During the same year the north Australian city of Darwin had been almost completely destroyed in a storm, and Patris found employment as a temporary accommodation ship for the residents of the destroyed city. This occupation lasted for only a year, after which a radically new use was found for the ship: she was converted into a ro-ro car/passenger ferry and used on services linking Ancona in Italy to Patras and Piraeus in Greece. In 1979 Patris was sold to Karageorgis Lines who retained her in the same service.

The Chandris liner service to Australia was closed down in late 1977 when Australis arrived in Australia as the last ship carrying government-sponsored migrant. From there on all migrant transport was handled by airplanes.

Ellinis was taken out of service in 1980 and laid up at Perama Bay. She remained laid up for several years, being used as a source of spare parts for her sister ship Britanis. In 1988 Chandris founded a subsidiary, Celebrity Cruises, transferring the ex-Italian liner Galileo to this new line. Celebrity prospered, with four newbuilt cruise ships entering service for them during the remaining Chandris years. Soon the popularity of Chandris grew tremendously low, with more focused needed on Celebrity, so it was decided to dissolve all other assets. After almost 37 years, Chandris Lines began to stop all operations in 1996, this plan ending with the phasing out of their Fantasy Cruises branch and layup of the Britanis in 1998. To this date only one Chandris ship, the cruise ferry The Azur, has not been scrapped.

== Ships ==
Ship	Built	In service	Tonnage	Status as of 2010	Image
Patris	1950	1959–1979	16,259 GRT	Scrapped in Pakistan 1987.	
Romantica	1936	1960–1977	3,488 GRT	Scrapped in Aliaga 1982.	
Bretagne; Brittany	1952	1961–1962; 1962–1963	16,335 GRT	Destroyed by fire in Greece, 1963.	
Ellinis	1932	1963–1980	24,351 GRT	Scrapped in Taiwan 1987.	
Regina	1939	1964–1979	10,603 GRT	Scrapped in Aliaga 1985.	
Carina II	1930	1964–1972	4,055 GRT	Laid up 1972, scrapped 1977.	
Fiesta	1946	1964–197?	3,659 GRT	Laid up mid 1970s, scrapped 1981.	
Fantasia	1935	1964–1976	4,325 GRT	Destroyed in fire, 1976.	
Australis; Italis	1940	1965–1977; 1979	26,485 GRT	Grounded at Fuerteventura, 1994, while en route to hotel service in Thailand. Subsequently, destroyed.	
Queen Frederica	1927	1965–1973	17,232 GRT	Scrapped 1978.	
Amerikanis	1952	1968–1980, 1984–1996	17,041 GRT	Scrapped in India 2001.	
Fiorita	1950	1970–1977	5,092 GRT	Laid up, was chartered numerous times before she capsized in 1987.	
Romanza	1939	1970–1991	10,480 GRT	Sold 1991, destroyed in a fire and subsequently sank, 1997.	
Atlantis	1944	1970–1972	20,175 GRT	Sold 1972, scrapped 2005.	
Radiosa	1947	1970–1982	1,149 GRT	Laid up 1982, scrapped 1988.	
Regina Magna	1939	1972–1977	23,801 GRT	Became accommodation ship 1977, sank en route to scrappers 1980.	
Britanis	1932	1971–1996	18,644 GRT	Sold for scrap 1998, sank under tow in 2000.	
The Victoria	1936	1975–1994	15,002 GRT	Sold to Louis Cruise Lines, broken up in 2004.	
Bon Vivant	1951	1973–1978	7,764 GRT	Sold 1978, scrapped in 1997	
Galileo	1963	1983–1988	27,888 GRT	Transferred to Celebrity Cruises 1990, sold to Sun Cruises 1997, sank as the Sun Vista, May 1999.	
The Azur	1971	1987–1994	14,717 GRT	Sold to Festival Cruises, now operating as the Knyaz Vladimir.	
