= SS Amsterdam (1950) =

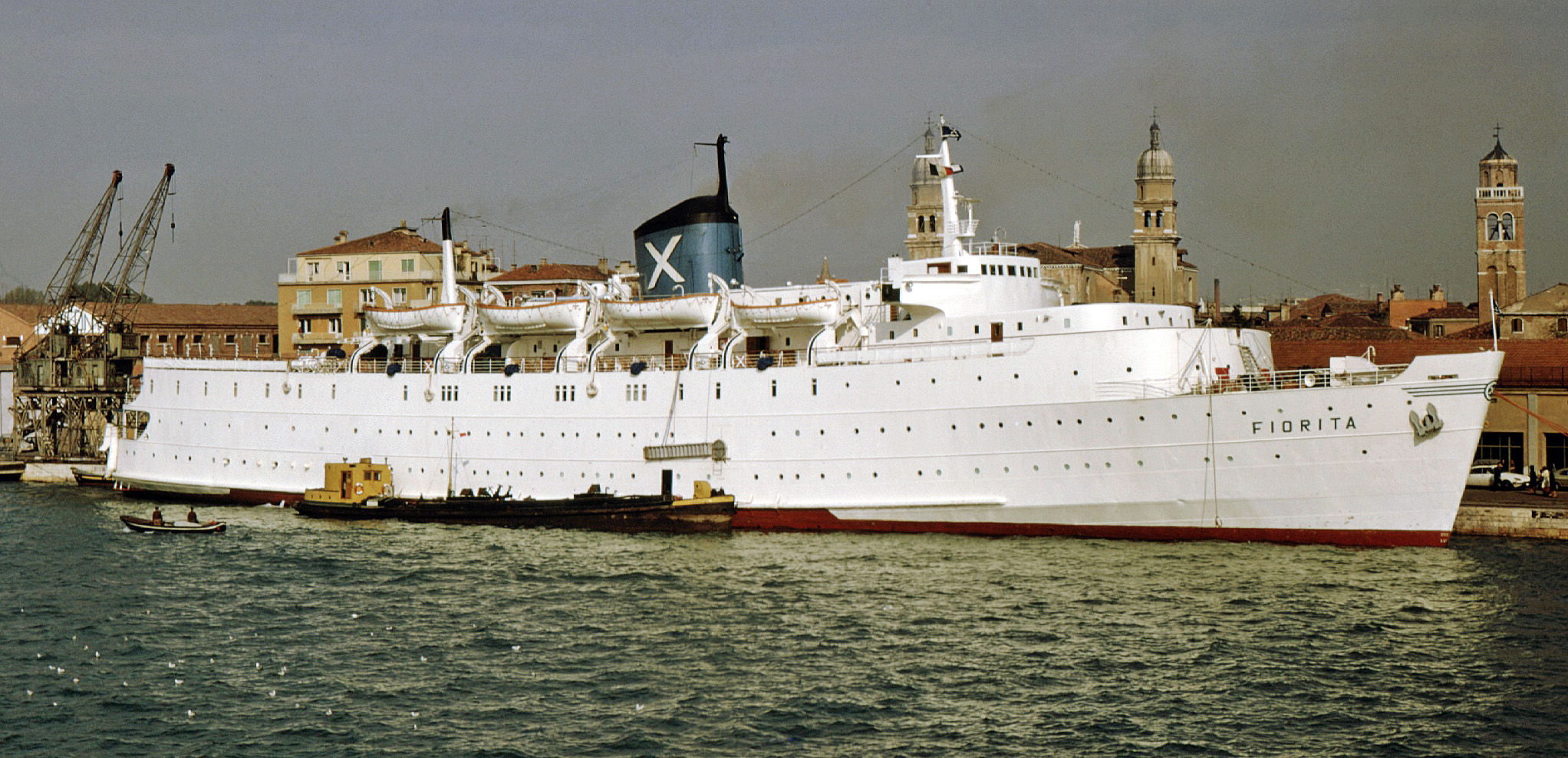
- TSS Fiorita in Venice, October 1972.

History
- Name: 1950–1970: TSS Amsterdam; 1970–1980: TSS Fiorita; 1980–1987: TSS Ariane II
- Operator: 1950–1967: British Railways; 1969–1980: Chandris Line; 1980–1987: laid up
- Port of registry: (United Kingdom)
- Builder: John Brown, Clydebank
- Yard number: 659
- Launched: 19 January 1950
- Completed: 1950
- Maiden voyage: 1950
- In service: 1950
- Out of service: 27 January 1987
- Identification: IMO number: 5015440
- Fate: Foundered 27 January 1987

General characteristics
- Tonnage: 5,092 gross register tons (GRT)
- Length: 377.1 feet (114.9 m)
- Beam: 54.5 feet (16.6 m)
- Draught: 15.2 feet (4.6 m)
- Installed power: 12,000 shp
- Propulsion: 4 steam turbines

TSS Amsterdam was a passenger vessel built for the British Railways in 1950.

== History ==
The ship was built by John Brown on Clydebank and launched on 19 January 1950. After a career as a passenger ferry for British Railways she was converted as a cruise ship for Chandris Line and renamed Fiorita. She sank in a storm in waters near Turkey and was later raised and used from 1973 as an accommodation ship. During the Lebanese Civil War, Lebanese airline Middle East Airlines moved some of their operation to Jeddah in 1976 and the Fiorita was used to accommodate their pilots and cabin crew. In 1980 she was renamed Ariane II. She capsized and sank in a storm at Fethiye, Turkey, on 27 January 1987.
