= MV Bloemfontein Castle =

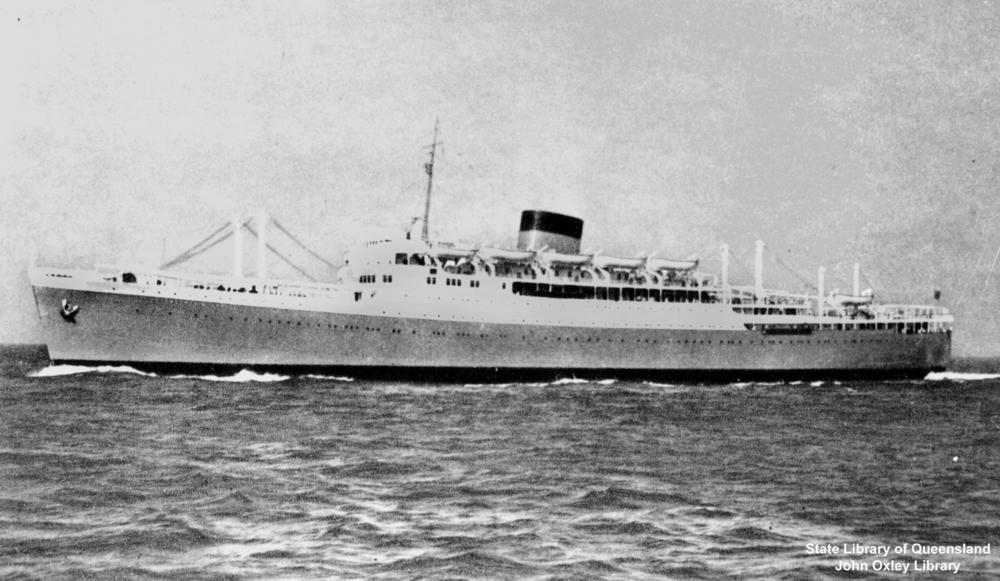
- MV Bloemfontein Castle

History
- Name: Bloemfontein Castle
- Owner: Union-Castle Line (1950–1959); Chandris Lines (1959–1979); Karageorgis Lines (1979–1987)
- Port of registry: 1950–1959: (United Kingdom) London; 1959–1987: (Greece) Piraeus
- Builder: Harland & Wolff, Belfast
- Yard number: 1421
- Launched: 25 August 1949
- Completed: 25 March 1950
- Maiden voyage: 6 April 1950
- In service: 19 September 1950
- Out of service: 1989
- Renamed: Patris in 1959; Mediterranean Island in 1979; Mediterranean Star in 1981; Terra in 1987
- Identification: IMO number: 5271836
- Fate: Scrapped in 1989.

General characteristics
- Tonnage: 18,400 GRT; 10,750 DWT
- Length: 594 ft 6 in (181.20 m) (overall); 570 ft 7 in (173.91 m) (pp)
- Beam: 76 ft 4 in (23.27 m)
- Propulsion: Two B & W two-stroke double acting marine diesels; Twin propeller
- Speed: 18.5 knots (34.3 km/h; 21.3 mph)
- Capacity: 739 passengers (single class); 186,000 ft^{3} (5,300 m^{3}) refrigerated cargo space

MV Bloemfontein Castle was a passenger liner. She was launched at Harland & Wolff's yard at Belfast on 25 August 1949 by Mrs Leif Egeland, wife of the High Commissioner for the Union of South Africa in London. She was completed on 25 March 1950. Built for Union-Castle Line's Intermediate service to South and East Africa, she was their first one-class ship. She took her name after the town of Bloemfontein, capital of the Orange Free State.

== Design and description ==
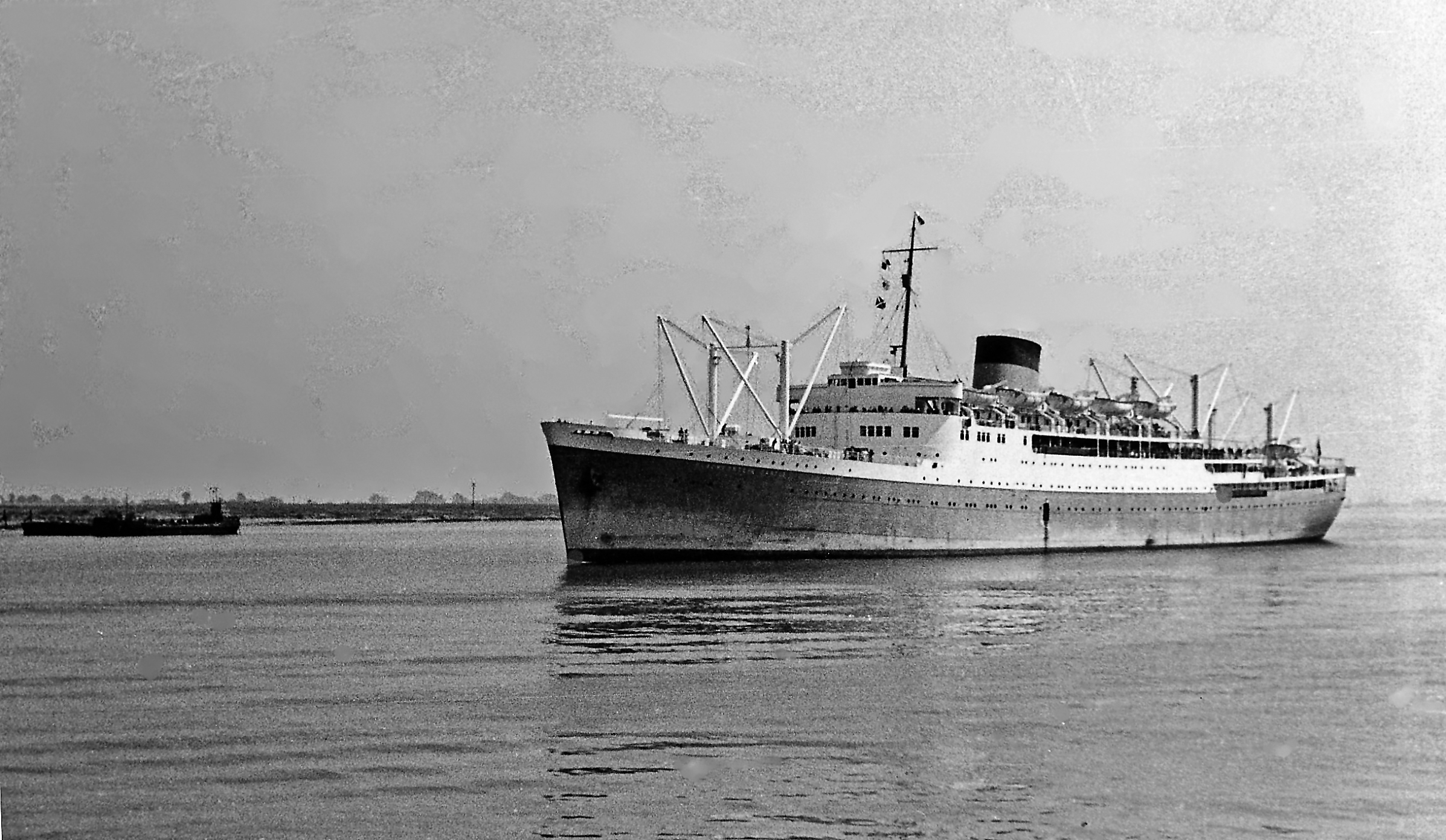
Bloemfontein Castle returning to London from her maiden voyage.

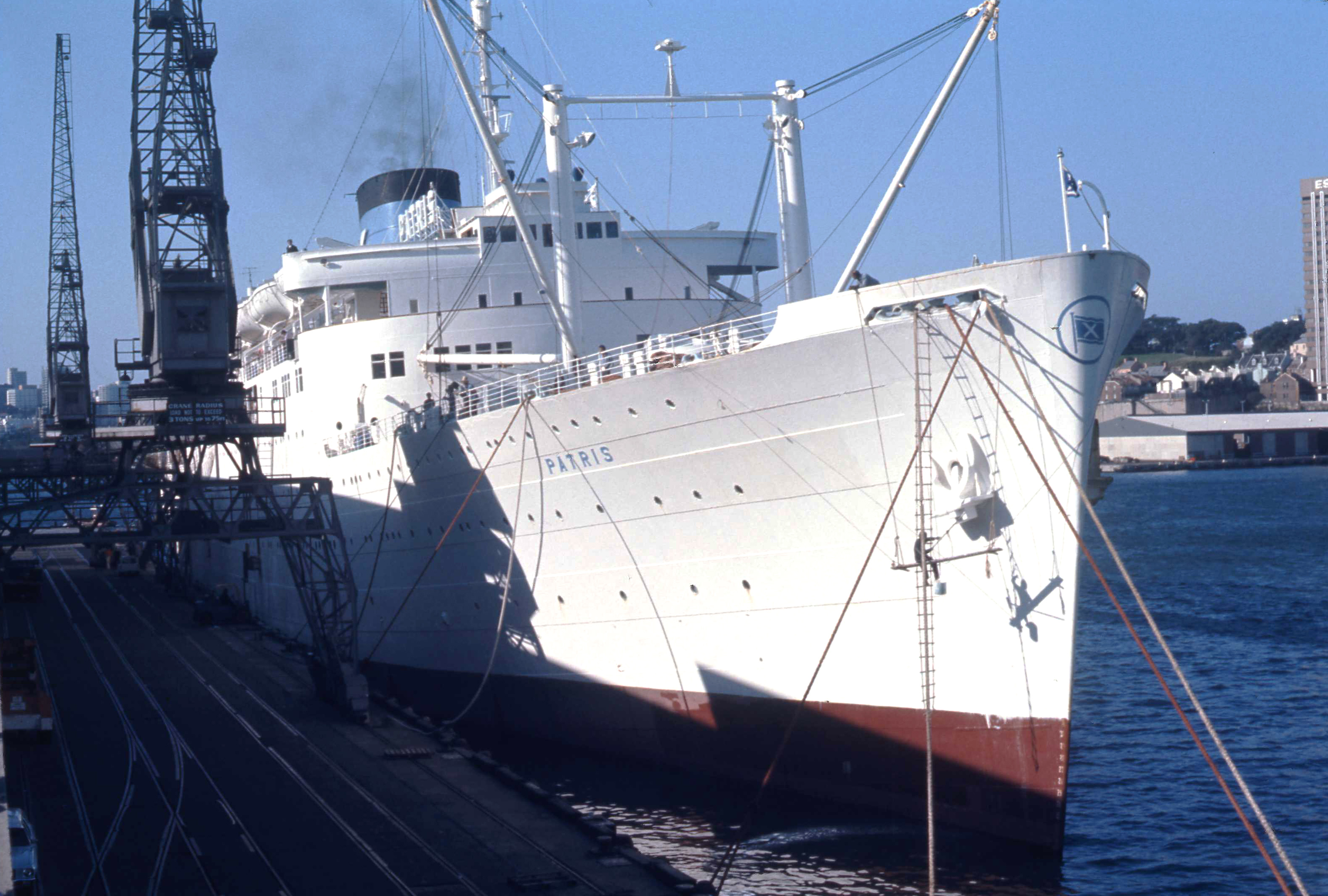
Patris at Sydney.

The Bloemfontein Castle was given the familiar Union-Castle profile of well-raked rounded stem, cruiser stern, a low streamlined funnel and a single mast abaft the bridge, giving a well-balanced appearance. There were two hatches forward and three aft, served by six 10-ton and four 5-ton capacity derricks. Cargo 'tweendeck spaces were insulated for the carriage of fruit, with certain compartments for chilled and frozen produce.

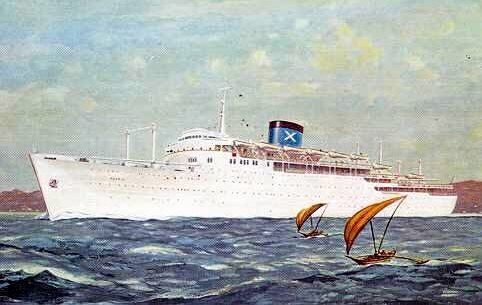
A painting of Patris

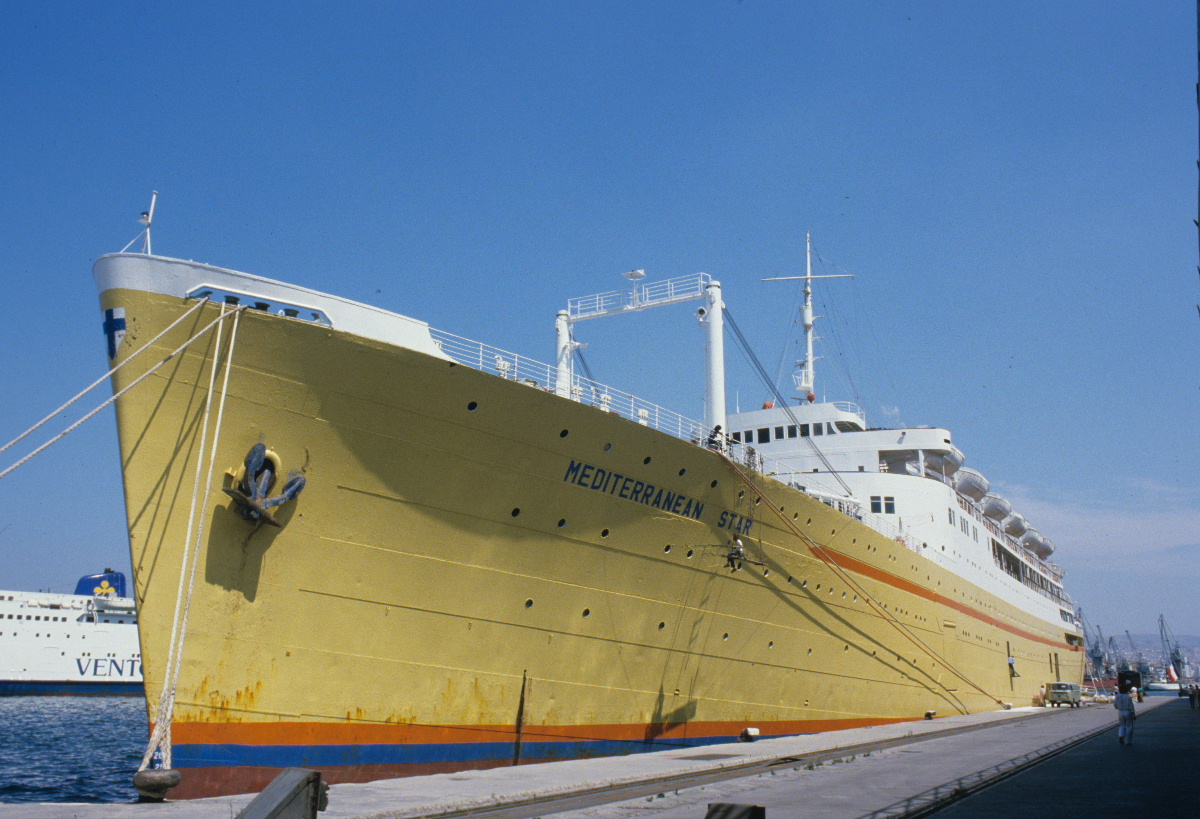
Mediterranean Star at Piraeus in 1984.

The Bloemfontein Castle was the first intermediate liner to be built since the war had ended, and the institution of a single class-tourist was an innovation for Union-Castle. She was built to cater for an expected emigrant boom and to alleviate the still considerable pressure at the time for accommodation at lower range fares. The main public rooms were on the promenade deck, a large lounge forward being extended the whole width of the ship so there were no passageways either side. Aft of this was a combined library and writing room, connected by a long gallery to a commodious smoking room. On the upper deck a dining room for 386 also extended the width of the ship. Accommodation for 739 passengers was spread through seven decks.

== Service history ==
Some 250 of Union-Castle's staff were invited for the shakedown cruise made from London in March, 1950. She left London on her maiden voyage on 6 April 1950 – sailing the London – Rotterdam – Las Palmas – Ascension – St. Helena – Walvis Bay – Cape Town – Port Elizabeth – East London – Durban – Lourenço Marques – Beira route that she alone served. She sometimes called at Southampton homewards during the busy fruit season.

On 8 January 1953, Bloemfontein Castle rescued 234 passengers and crew from the Holland Afrika liner Klipfontein which was sinking after hitting a submerged object off Mozambique. Captain J. A. Fergurson and his senior officers later received commemorative gifts from the Holland Afrika Line.

When the expected flow of European emigrants to South Africa did not materialize, Bloemfontein Castle was sold to the Greek Chandris Lines in 1959, after a short life of only nine years with Union-Castle.

Renamed Patris and refitted in just three weeks for Chandris' service between Europe and Australia, the ship was the first large liner in the Chandris fleet. After Darwin was almost destroyed by Cyclone Tracy on Christmas Day in 1974, the Patris anchored in Darwin Harbour for nine months to provide emergency accommodation for those left homeless. In December 1975 Patris was refitted as car ferry for the Adriatic service. She was operated under the Chandris brand from 1976 until 1979, connecting Venice and Ancona to Patras. In 1979 Chandris sold Patris to Karageorgis Lines, who first renamed her Mediterranean Island then Mediterranean Star in 1981. She was used as a ferry until sold to Pakistani breakers in 1987.
