= John D. Chandris =

Greek businessman (1890–1942)

- Born: 1890
- Died: 1942 (aged 51–52)
- Occupation: Shipowner
- Children: Dimitri Chandris; Anthony Chandris

John D. Chandris (1890–1942) was a Greek shipowner.

Chandris was born in Chios, then part of the Ottoman Empire. In 1915, after years of experience in the shipping industry, he bought his first ship, SS Dimitrios. By World War I, Chandris' fleet was made up of four ships, including steamships. In 1922, he expanded into the passenger shipping market.

Following the outbreak of World War II, Chandris followed the exodus of shipowners from Greece. He moved to England. Chandris ran the cruise lines until he retired in 1939. He died in 1942 at the age of 52 from natural causes.

His two sons, Anthony and Dimitri, later rebuilt the company, named Chandris Line. A partnership called Chandris-Fantasy Cruises started in the early 1980s and later was divided into two separate arms, Fantasy-Cruises and Celebrity cruises.
