= SS America (1939) =

Ocean liner and cruise ship from 1940 to 1994

Coordinates: 28.346077°N 14.180442°W

- SS America docked at pier 86 in Manhattan, New York City sometime in the summer of 1955.

History
- Name: SS America (1940–41; 1946–64; 1978); USS West Point (1941–46); RHMS Australis (1964–78); RHMS Italis (1978–80); SS Noga (1980–84/93); SS Alferdoss (1984–93); SS American Star (1993–94)
- Owner: United States Maritime Commission (1940–63); United States Lines (1940–41; 1946–64); United States Navy (1941–46); Chandris Group (1964–78; 1978–80); Venture Cruise Lines (1978); Intercommerce Corporation (1980–84); Silver Moon Ferries (1984–92); Chaophraya Transport Co (1992–94)
- Operator: United States Lines (1940–41; 1946–64); United States Navy (1941–46); Chandris Lines (1964–78; 1978–80); Venture Cruise Lines (June–August 1978)
- Port of registry: (United States) New York City (1940–41; 1946–64); United States Navy (1941–46); (Greece) Piraeus (1964–67; 1968–78); Panama City (1967–68; 1978–94)
- Route: Cruising (1940–41; 1965–79); New York – Le Havre – Southampton (1946–64)
- Ordered: 1936
- Builder: Newport News Shipbuilding and Drydock Co.
- Cost: $17.2 million ($310 million in 2025)
- Yard number: 369
- Laid down: 22 August 1938
- Launched: 31 August 1939
- Christened: 31 August 1939 by Eleanor Roosevelt
- Completed: 16 April 1940
- Acquired: 1 June 1946
- Commissioned: 16 June 1941
- Decommissioned: 12 March 1946
- Maiden voyage: 22 August 1940
- In service: 1940–1979
- Out of service: 12 September 1979
- Identification: Code Letters WEDI (1940–41); Code Letters NWGB (1941–46); Code Letters WEDI (1946–64); United States Official Number 239728 (1940–64); IMO number: 5014123 ( –1996)
- Fate: Wrecked at Playa de Garcey on Fuerteventura in the Canary Islands, 18 January 1994
- Notes: Declared a total loss in July 1994

General characteristics
- Tonnage: 26,454 GRT (1940–65); 14,320 NRT (1940–65); 33,961 GT (1965–94)
- Displacement: 21,079 light, 35,440 full load
- Length: 723 ft (220 m)
- Beam: 93 ft (28 m)
- Draft: 33 ft (10 m)
- Decks: 11
- Installed power: 2 x steam turbines, double reduction geared
- Propulsion: Twin screw propellers
- Speed: 22.5 kn (41.7 km/h; 25.9 mph)
- Capacity: 1,202 (passengers) as originally designed; 7,678 when reconfigured as West Point; 2,258 when rebuilt as Australis
- Crew: 643 (originally); 750 (World War II)
- Armament: (World War II only); 4 × 5 in AA guns; 4 × 3 in/50 naval guns; 8 × .50-cal. machine guns.

SS America was an ocean liner and cruise ship built in the United States in 1940 for the United States Lines and designed by the noted American naval architect William Francis Gibbs. It carried many names in the 54 years between its construction and its 1994 wreck: SS America (carrying this name three different times during its career); troop transport USS West Point; and SS Australis, Italis, Noga, Alferdoss, and American Star. It served most notably in passenger service as America and the Greek-flagged Australis.

Sold with the intention of being refitted to become a hotel ship, she was towed towards Thailand and eventually wrecked as American Star at Playa de Garcey on Fuerteventura in the Canary Islands on January 18, 1994. The wreck deteriorated and completely collapsed into the sea. By 2024 it was no longer visible on the ocean surface and has become an artificial reef.

== Construction (1936–1940) ==
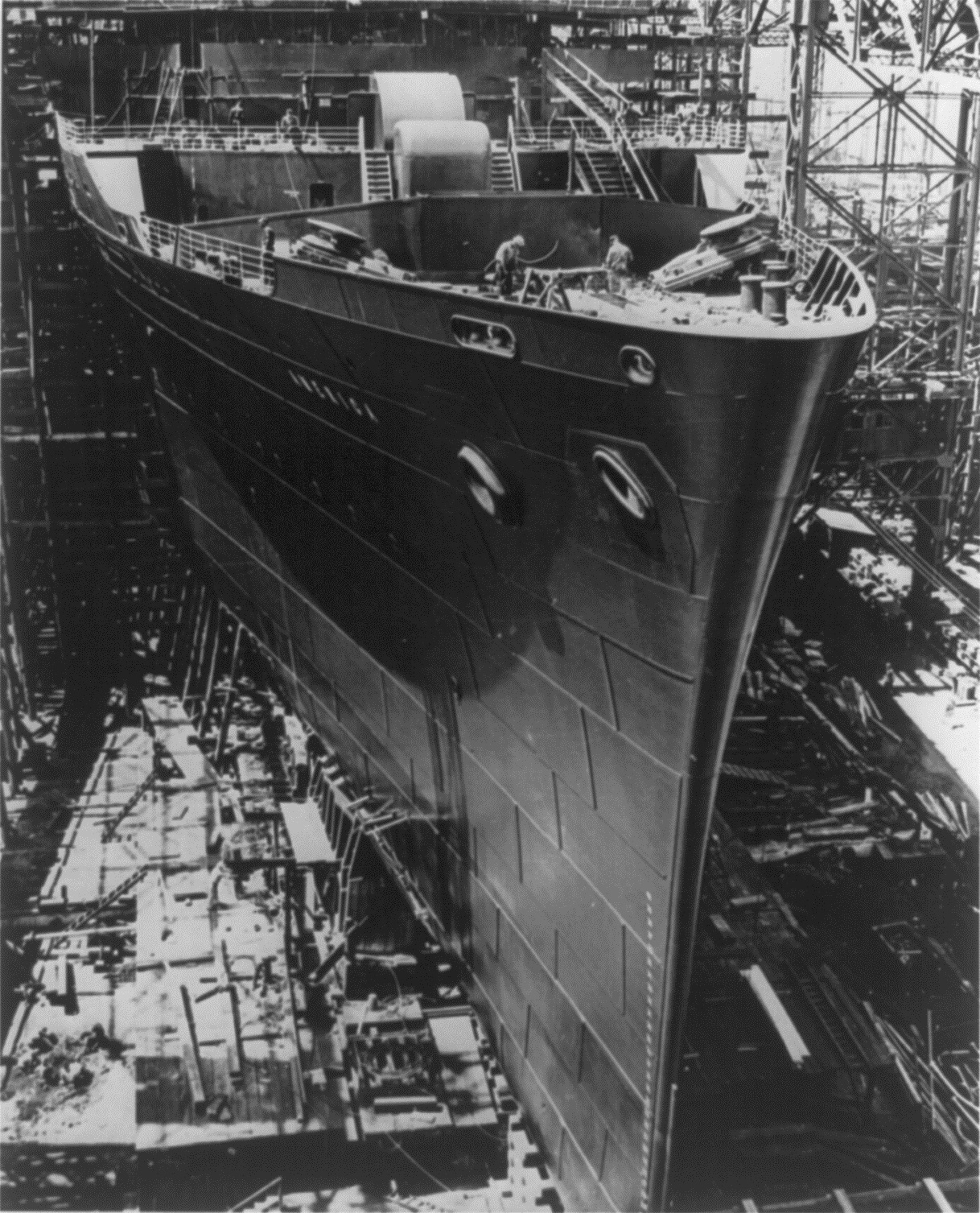
The America under construction.

America was laid down under the first Maritime Commission contract on August 22, 1938, at Newport News, Virginia by the Newport News Shipbuilding and Drydock Company.

It was one of only a few ocean liners, American or otherwise, to have had its interiors designed by women—the New York firm Smyth, Urquhart & Marckwald. The ornate decor typical of liners of the past was forgone, in favor of a more contemporary and informal design.

The aim was to provide an atmosphere of cheerfulness and sophisticated charm.

America was launched on August 31, 1939 and was sponsored by Eleanor Roosevelt, wife of then-president of the United States Franklin D. Roosevelt. Her cousin, Kermit Roosevelt, was one of the founders of United States Lines.

== Early career (1940–1941) ==
World War II began in Europe on September 1, 1939, the day after the vessel was launched. The United States was still neutral at that point. The ship's name, along with "United States Lines" and two American flags were painted in large size to be clearly visible on both sides of the hull. The vessel did not take to its intended North Atlantic service route, instead sailing in safer waters close to the US. At night, it sailed fully illuminated, as further precaution.

The liner entered service on August 10, 1940, undertaking its maiden voyage, a cruise to San Juan, as the flagship of the United States Lines.

As originally designed, America could carry 543 in cabin class, 418 in tourist class, 241 in third class, and 643 crew. The interior accommodations were styled by architects Eggers & Higgins to be the utmost in contemporary American design, making use of stainless steel, ceramics, and synthetics.

America was originally constructed with low funnels in order to give the ship a modern, streamlined appearance. Very early in its career, however, the height of the funnels was increased by 16 feet, due to heavy soot deposits on the decks. The forward funnel was a non-functioning dummy, housing the horn and certain ventilation uptakes. The vessel was quietly fitted with a degaussing cable for protection against naval mines on January 3, 1941.

On May 28, 1941, while at Saint Thomas in the United States Virgin Islands on a cruise, America was called up to service by the United States Navy. It was ordered to return to Newport News to be handed over to the Navy.

=== Duquesne Spy Ring ===
Two German spies, Franz Joseph Stigler and Erwin Wilhelm Siegler, were members of its crew in 1941. While on America, they obtained information about the movement of ships and military defense preparations at the Panama Canal, observed and reported defense preparations in the Canal Zone, and met with other German agents to advise them in their espionage efforts. They operated as couriers transmitting information between the United States and German agents abroad. Stigler worked undercover as chief butcher. Meanwhile, Siegler worked undercover as chief baker. Both remained on America until its conversion by the Navy into a troop transport and its commission into the U.S. Navy as USS West Point.

Stigler and Siegler, along with the 31 other German agents of the Duquesne Spy Ring, were later uncovered by the FBI in the largest espionage conviction in U.S. history.

Upon conviction, Stigler was sentenced to serve 16 years in prison on espionage charges with two concurrent years for registration violations; Siegler was sentenced to 10 years' imprisonment on espionage charges and a concurrent two-year term for violation of the Foreign Agents Registration Act.

== US Navy service (1941–1946) ==
=== 1941 ===
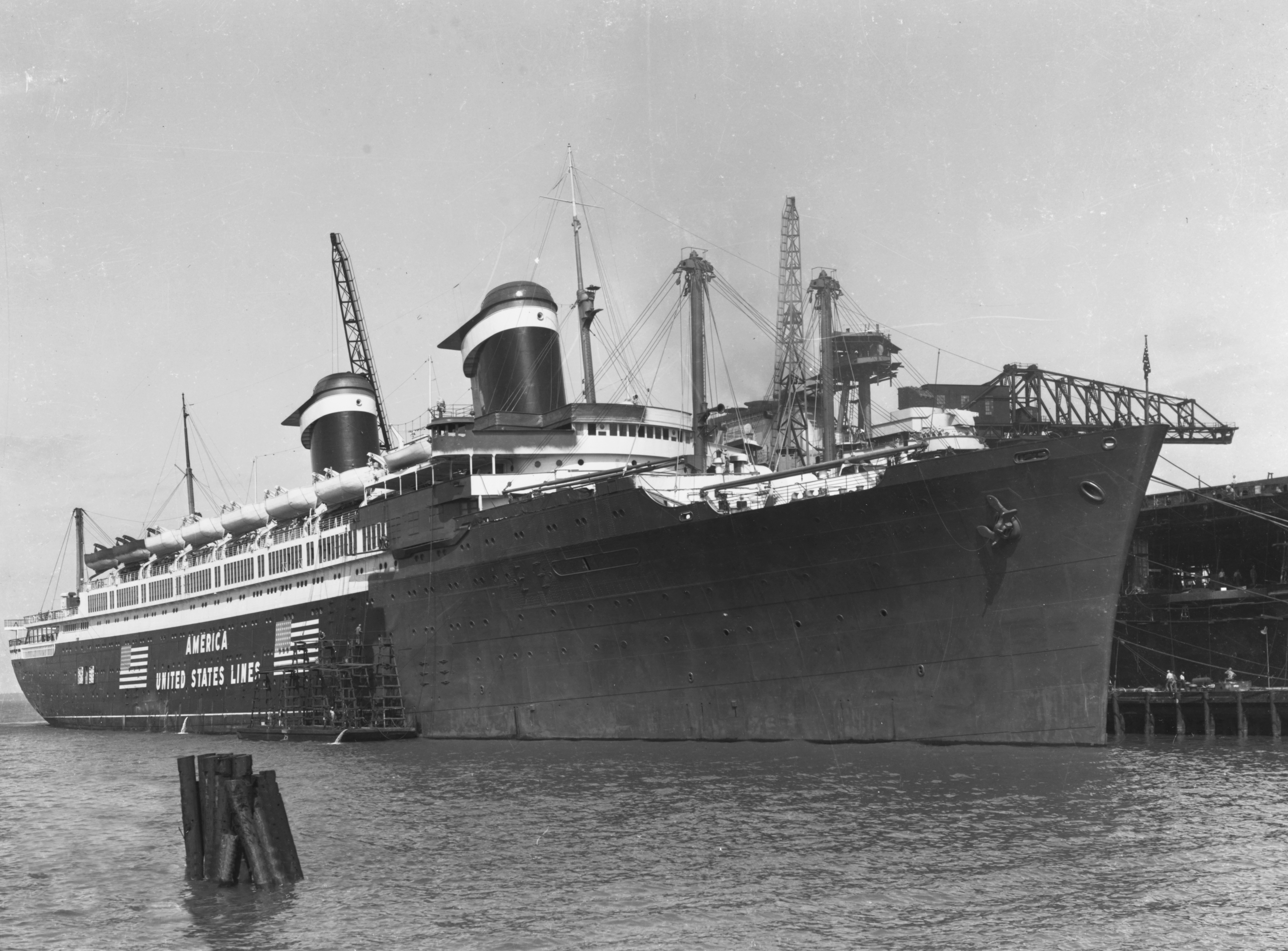
America in Norfolk being repainted for naval service, 2 June 1941. The carrier USS Hornet can be seen behind her.

America was moored at Norfolk, Virginia, and acquired by the Navy on June 1, 1941, to be used as a troop transport. The ship was renamed USS West Point (AP-23), the second U.S. Navy ship of the name. It entered the Norfolk Ship Yards on June 6, 1941, for conversion and on June 15, 1941, it was commissioned for service under the command of Captain Frank H. Kelley Jr.

By the time the conversion was completed, life-rafts covered the promenade deck windows, "standee" bunks could be found everywhere, several anti-aircraft weapons were installed, all of the windows were covered, the ship was painted in a camouflage gray color, and the troop-carrying capacity was increased to 7,678.

USS West Point soon proceeded to New York City and, while anchored off the Staten Island quarantine station on 16 July, took on board 137 Italian citizens and 327 German citizens from the consulates of those nations in the United States which had been closed. West Point got under way at 2:55 that afternoon, bound for Portugal, and arrived at Lisbon on July 23.

While there, the ship was visited by Portuguese naval and diplomatic dignitaries; and it transferred supplies to the Coast Guard cutter Ingham, the "station ship" at Lisbon, Portugal. After its final Italian passenger had disembarked on July 23, and the last German on July 24, West Point commenced taking on 321 American citizens and 67 Chinese—consular staffs and their families – on July 26.

Returning to New York on August 1, West Point discharged its passengers and headed south for an overhaul at Portsmouth, Virginia. She then participated in tactical exercises off the Virginia Capes from August 26–29 in company with Wakefield and Mount Vernon.

==== The Preamble to Convoy WS-12X ====
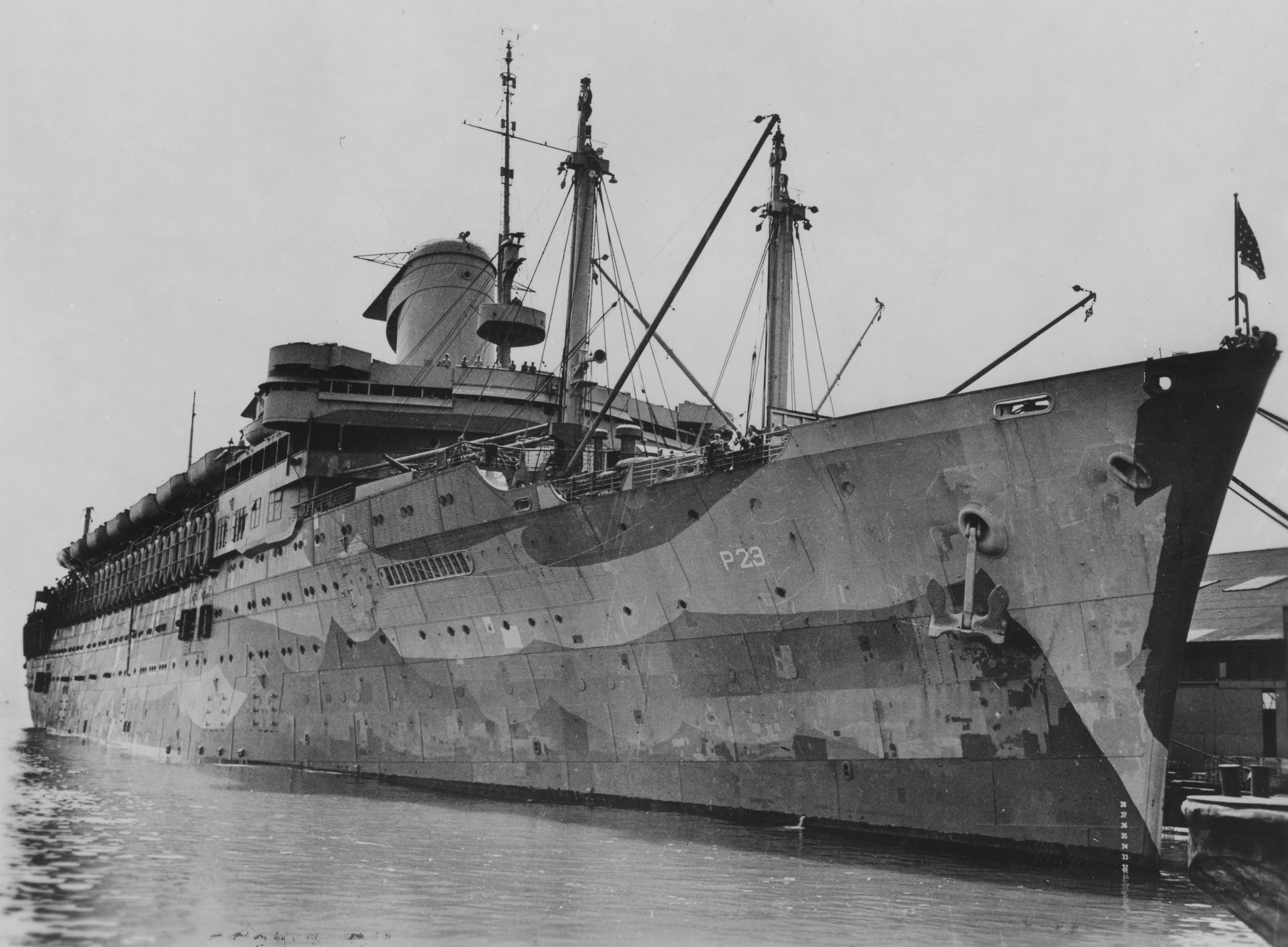
USS West Point while docked.

The Atlantic Conference was held on August 9, 1941 in Placentia Bay, Newfoundland, between Prime Minister Winston Churchill and President Roosevelt. Besides the "official" agenda, Churchill hoped to obtain considerable assistance from the US, but the American President had his political hands tied. On September 1, 1941, Roosevelt received an urgent and most secret message asking for US Navy troopships manned by Navy crews and escorted by U.S.N. fighting ships to carry British troops for the purpose of reinforcing the Middle East. On 4 September the US destroyer, USS Greer (DD-145), came under an unsuccessful U-boat attack. Roosevelt gave authority to the US Navy to "shoot to kill". On September 5, the Franklin D. Roosevelt assured Winston Churchill that six vessels would be provided to carry twenty thousand troops and would be escorted by the American Navy.

The chief of Naval Operations ordered troop ships divisions seventeen and nineteen, on September 26, 1941, to prepare their vessels for approximately six months at sea. These transports were to load to capacity with food, ammunition, medical supplies, fuel and water and were to arrive at Halifax, NS on or about 6 November and after the arrival of a British convoy from the UK were to load twenty thousand troops. The Prime Minister mentioned in his letter that it would be for the President to say what would be required in replacement if any of these ships were to be sunk by enemy action. Agreements were worked out for the troops to be carried as supernumeraries and rations to be paid out of Lend Lease Funds and officer laundry bills were to be paid in cash. All replenishments of provisions, general stores, fuel and water would be provided by the UK. Fuel and water would be charged for the escorts to the UK in Trinidad and Cape Town only. The troops would conform to US Navy and ships regulation. Intoxicating liquors were prohibited. It was further agreed that the troops were to rig and man their own anti-aircraft guns to augment the ships batteries.

==== Convoy William Sail WS-12X ====
On November 3, it sailed from Virginia waters and arrived at Halifax, Nova Scotia, on November 5, 1941. There, on 8 & 9 November, it embarked 241 officers and 5,202 men of the 55th Brigade, Bedfordshire and Hertfordshire Regiment, and 100 men of a US Army Field Service company. On 10 November, West Point – in company with five other transports: Wakefield, Mount Vernon, Orizaba, Leonard Wood, and Joseph T. Dickman – got under way for India as Convoy HS-124. En route, they were joined by the aircraft carrier Ranger, the cruisers Vincennes and Quincy, and a division of destroyers.

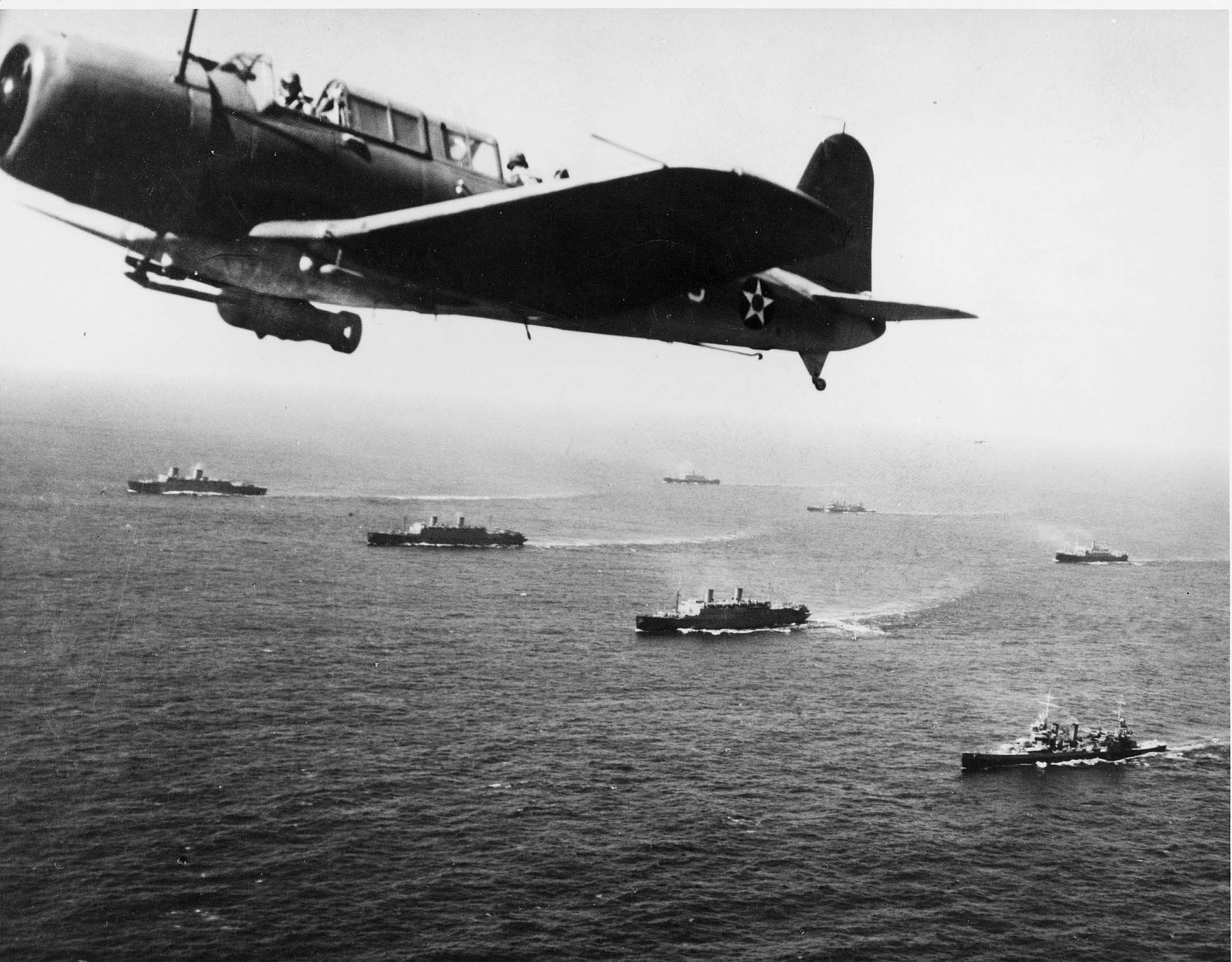
Convoy WS-12 en route to Cape Town in 1941.

On November 17, 1941, Convoy WS12-X reaches Trinidad. All ships were replenished, and the convoy departs Trinidad on November 19, 1941.

On December 7, 1941 at 2000hrs, the convoy received a radio communication of the Japanese attack on Pearl Harbor.

On December 9, convoy WS12-X arrived in Cape Town, South Africa. At about 0800 on December 13, 1941, the troopships departed Cape Town headed for Bombay.

At 650 on December 21, 1941, USS Mount Vernon (AP-22) and USS Orizaba detached from the convoy headed for Bombay, and were bound for Mombasa. The remainder of the convoy continued to Bombay under the escort of HMS Dorsetshire, arriving on December 27, 1941.

Wakefield commenced discharging its embarked troops at 1900 at the Ballard Piers, completed her unloading, and shifted berths the next morning. West Point took Wakefield's former berth while Joseph T. Dickman moored to unload its equipment and troops.

=== 1942 ===
==== Convoy BM 11 ====
Having completed its discharge by December 1941, West Point anchored in the stream on the morning of January 2, 1942, and awaited further orders until January 4, when British authorities asked Captain Kelley, of West Point, if his ship and Wakefield could be brought under 30-foot (9.1 m) draught to make passage for Singapore. Kelley responded that it could be done, but this would entail discharging ballast and expelling some of the ship's fresh water supply—thus endangering the ship's stability.

Due to prevailing low-water conditions at Bombay at this point, neither West Point nor Wakefield could go alongside piers in the harbor to either load equipment or troops. Thus, the embarkation and loading procedures had to be carried out by the tedious process of embarking troops and loading supplies from smaller ships and lighters brought alongside. Wakefield embarked – almost to a man – the troops which it had brought from Halifax, a total of 4,506, while West Point embarked two-thirds of the troops which it had transported, in addition to some which had come out on other ships. All told, it carried some 5,272 men.

West Point sailed for Singapore on January 9, in a "15-knot" convoy, with Captain Kelley as the convoy commodore. In addition to the two American ships, three British transports – Duchess of Bedford, Empress of Japan, and Empire Star – made up the remainder of the van. Escorted by British light cruiser HMS Caledon until this ship was relieved by light cruiser HMS Glasgow at 1630 on January 22, the convoy's escort soon swelled to three cruisers and four destroyers as the convoy neared Java. Japanese submarine activities near the Indonesian archipelago prompted concern for the safe arrival of the valuable ships, hence a 200-mile (320 km) detour through the shallow, coral-studded Sunda Strait.

Led by British cruiser HMS Exeter, the ships slowed to 10 knots (19 km/h), and streaming paravane gear, began the passage. An escorting destroyer steamed between each transport, as they steamed in single-column order. It was a dangerous passing, a small divergence from the charted course could mean a disastrous grounding.

The screen's commander, Captain Oliver L. Gordon, R.N., commanding Exeter, desired to arrive at Singapore with as many ships as possible by dawn on January 29, and thus split up the convoy, sending the faster vessels—West Point, Wakefield, and Empress of Japan—ahead at increased speed under escort of cruisers HMS Exeter, HMS Durban, HMS Dragon, and destroyers HMS Express and HMS Electra. Proceeding to Singapore via Berhala Strait, Durian Strait, and Philips Channel, the group steamed through these bodies of water in bright moonlight which made navigational aids unnecessary. Upon their arrival off Singapore, the ships lay to in an exposed position, beyond the range of shore-based antiaircraft guns, until pilots could be obtained to bring the ships in. Since the naval base came under daily heavy air raids, the transports proceeded to Keppel Harbor, the commercial basin at Singapore, where they could discharge their troops and cargo.

==== Singapore ====
Securing abreast godowns (warehouses) 52, 53, and 54, West Point commenced off-loading equipment and disembarking its troops. All but 670 engineer troops, who had been ordered retained on board, were ashore before nightfall. Air raids, meanwhile, continued until midnight as the Japanese steadily pounded Singapore from the air. At each alert, the local workers working dockside would vanish, taking to the shelters and leaving the vital cargo still unloaded. As a result, the unloading was carried out by the crew of West Point, its embarked troops, and 22 local workers who were brought aboard to assist.

On January 30, seven Japanese bombers appeared over the city and were engaged by British Brewster Buffalo fighters. As the alert continued, 30 more Japanese planes appeared overhead, on course over Keppel Harbor. Several bombs fell on shore, eastward of West Point's moorings, while another stick fell in the water to the southward. In the interim, bombs hit other targets. A small tanker moored near Wakefield was sunk at dockside; bombs fell abreast Empress of Japan; and Wakefield took a direct hit forward which destroyed its sick bay, killed five men and wounded nine. The last bombs in this stick straddled West Point and showered her with shrapnel. As the raid lifted, West Point sent two medical officers and 11 corpsmen on board Wakefield, at the latter's request, to render medical assistance.

Later that morning, Captain Kelley attended a conference with British authorities, who informed him that his ship was to be used to carry a contingent of Australian troops from Suez to Singapore and to transport refugees and evacuees to Ceylon. With the emergency "acute", Kelley agreed to take on board up to one thousand women and children and such additional men as the British desired to send. With the abandonment of the naval dockyard, untenable in the face of increasingly heavier Japanese bombardments from artillery and aircraft, several dockyard naval and civilian personnel and their families were assigned to West Point for evacuation. Most carried only hand baggage; had little, if any, money; but were all fortunate enough to escape the doomed city before its fall to the onrushing Japanese troops of General Yamashita. All told, some 1,276 naval officers, their families, dockyard civilians, civilian evacuees, a 16-man Royal Air Force (RAF) contingent, and 225 naval ratings made up the people embarked by 6:00 p.m. on January 30.

Clearing Singapore, West Point and Wakefield headed due west, escorted by HMS Durban. Overcast and squally weather covered their departure and permitted them to transit the Banka Strait unmolested by the seemingly omnipresent Japanese aircraft. Routed to Batavia, Java, to embark more refugees, West Point led Wakefield and Durban through the minefields and anchored in Batavia Roads at 3:05 a.m. on January 31, 1942. HMS Electra—which would be lost in the Battle of the Java Sea on February 27–came alongside eight hours later and transferred 20 naval dockyard personnel, three women, five naval officers' wives, one Free French officer, and an RAF officer to West Point for passage to Ceylon.

==== February 1942 to end of 1942 ====
At 12:40 pm on February 1, 1942, West Point—in company with Wakefield and under escort of Exeter, HMS Encounter, and HMAS Vampire—got under way. The destroyers eventually went off to perform other duties, and Exeter as well soon dropped away to escort another convoy, leaving the two big troopships on their own. While they were en route, disconcerting news came over the radio. Japanese I-boats (identified after the war as I-162 and I-153) had been active in the vicinity, sinking six ships between them. West Point acquired an extra passenger while en route; for, on February 4, a baby was born on board.

Colombo Harbor, Ceylon, where they arrived on February 6, was so crowded that British authorities could not permit Wakefield to repair its damage there. The passengers, in turn, experienced much difficulty in arranging for suitable transportation ashore. In addition, neither transport could fully provision.

British authorities requested the American ships to evacuate personnel to Bombay. Accordingly, West Point took on board eight men, 55 women, and 53 children, as well as 670 troops, for passage to India. Wakefield, despite its weakened condition caused by the direct hit on January 29, embarked two naval ratings, six RAF personnel, and 25 men and one officer of a British Bofors gun detachment. The two ships departed Colombo on February 8 and, escorted by the Greek destroyer Vasilissa Olga, proceeded at 20 knots (37 km/h). Captain Kelley later highly praised the operations of this sole escort. Although heavy weather was encountered en route, the Greek destroyer acquitted itself well, continuing to patrol its station "at all times at high speed ahead of our zig-zag."

After discharging her evacuees at Bombay, West Point parted company with Wakefield and proceeded to Suez where she picked up Australian troops who were being withdrawn from the North African Campaign to fight the Japanese in Southeast Asia. Meanwhile, one disaster after another had plagued the Allied forces. Singapore fell on February 15; and Java on March 4. West Point carried its embarked troops to Australia and disembarked them at Adelaide and Melbourne before heading across the Pacific toward San Francisco.

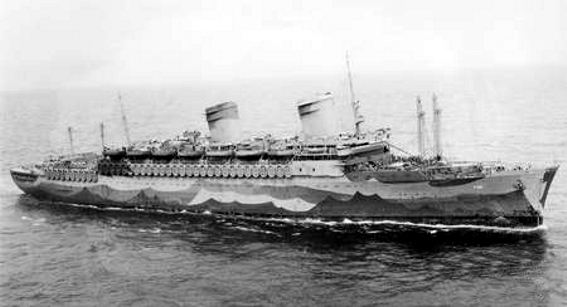
USS West Point underway in August 1942.

As the Allies built up for the long road back, West Point participated in the effort to aid America's allies in the southwest Pacific with massive contingents of troops. Accordingly, the transport carried men to Wellington, New Zealand, and arrived on May 30. There, it received orders to return to New York; and it got under way from Melbourne on June 8, bound for the Panama Canal. It entered the Atlantic on June 26 and arrived at New York on July 2.

After two voyages to the United Kingdom, West Point sailed for India, via the South Atlantic route, and arrived at Bombay on November 29, 1942, before pushing on for Auckland, New Zealand, the following month.

=== 1943 ===
The transport returned via Nouméa, New Caledonia, to San Francisco on January 31, 1943. It remained on the West Coast until February 16, when it got under way for the South Pacific and retraced its route to Wellington, New Zealand, and Australian ports. It then continued west—calling at Bombay, Massawa, Aden, and Suez—and stopped briefly at Cape Town en route to Rio de Janeiro, Brazil. Eventually arriving at New York on May 4, the ship subsequently made two voyages to Casablanca, French Morocco before sailing for Bombay via the southern Atlantic route. Calling at Rio de Janeiro and Cape Town en route, the big transport continued, via Bombay and Melbourne, on for the West Coast of the United States.

Soon thereafter, West Point began transporting troops to Australia and continued making voyages there and to Allied bases in the Central and South Pacific through the end of 1943.

=== 1944 ===
In 1944, the transport continued its vital workhorse duties, departing San Francisco on January 12, 1944, bound for Nouméa and Guadalcanal; and from San Pedro, California on February 22, bound for Nouméa and Milne Bay. It sailed from the latter port and steamed via the Panama Canal to Boston, Massachusetts, where it arrived on June 12. In May 1944, Captain Robert A. Dyer was relieved as commanding officer by Captain Webb C. Haves, grandson of former US President Rutherford B. Hayes. It conducted five successive voyages to the United Kingdom before departing Boston on December 6, 1944 for Oran, Algeria, Casablanca, French Morocco, and Marseille, France. The transport left the Mediterranean on December 26 and proceeded to Norfolk, Virginia.

=== 1945–1946 ===
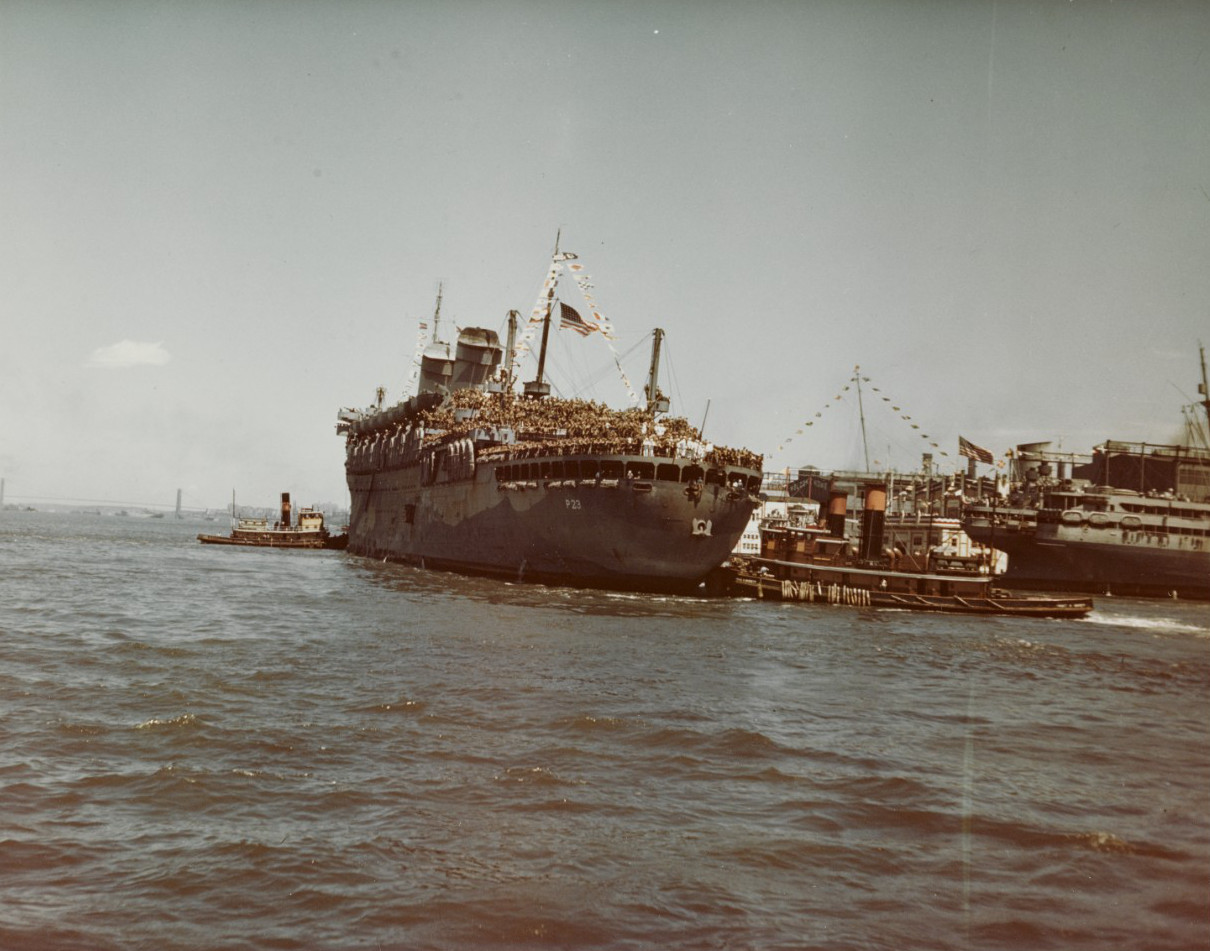
USS West Point in New York City in summer 1945.

In 1945, West Point voyaged to Italian and French ports, via Oran or Gibraltar, staging from Hampton Roads, Boston, or New York. After Germany surrendered, it took part in some of the initial "Magic Carpet" voyages, bringing home American troops from the European battlefronts. Following its last European voyage—to Le Havre, France—West Point was transferred to the Pacific Fleet. It departed Boston on December 10, 1945, transited the Panama Canal, and proceeded to Manila, Philippines via Pearl Harbor. Retracing the same route, it docked at pier 88 in New York on February 7, 1946 and soon got under way for Hampton Roads, where it was released from troop-carrying service on February 22.

Its last voyage under the name West Point was a short trip from Portsmouth to Newport News for reconversion to a passenger liner. There, six days later, it was officially decommissioned, stricken from the Naval Vessel Register on March 12, and transferred to the Maritime Commission's War Shipping Administration.

During its naval service, it carried a total of over 350,000 troops which was the largest total of any Navy troopship in service during World War II. On one voyage in 1944 it was able to transport 9,305 people. Additionally the troop transport carried Red Cross workers, United Nations officials, children, civilians, prisoners of war, and U.S.O. entertainers.

=== Awards ===

During its service in the U.S. Navy, West Point earned the following awards:

- American Defense Service Medal
- European-African-Middle Eastern Campaign Medal
- Asiatic-Pacific Campaign Medal
- World War II Victory Medal

== Postwar career ==
=== United States Lines career (1946–1964) ===
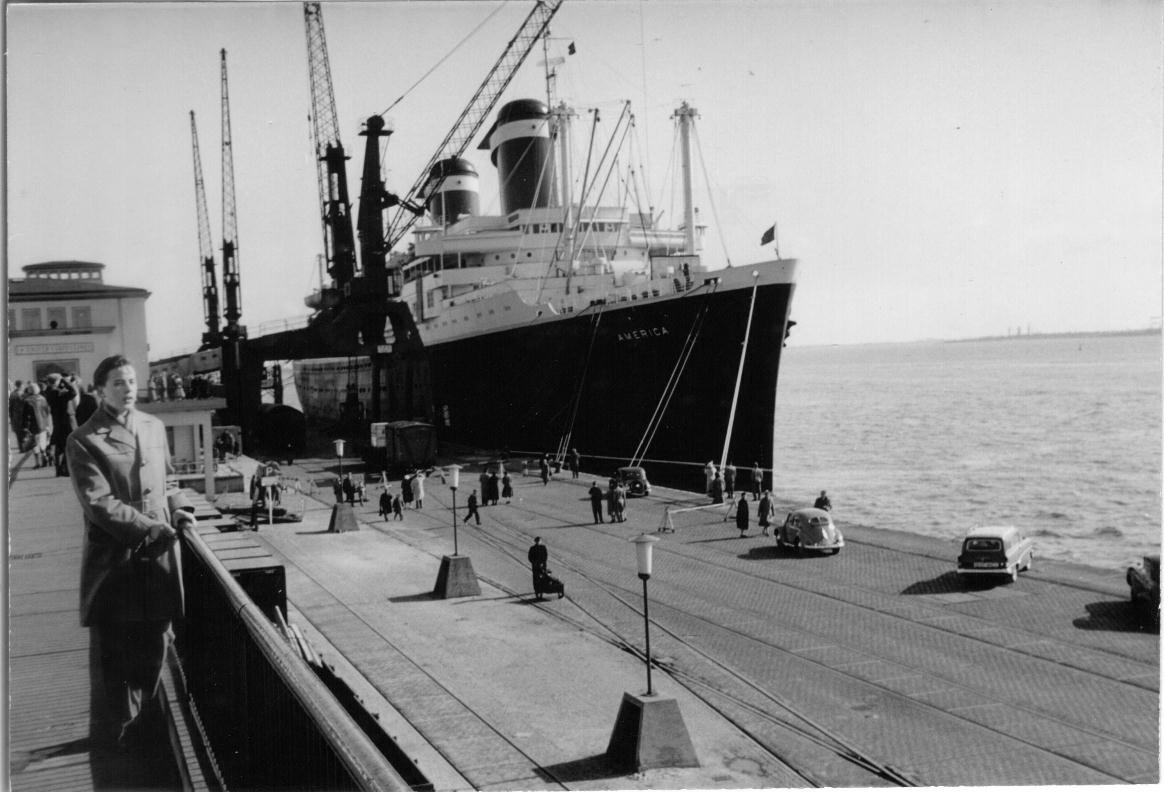
America in Bremerhaven in 1958.

In February 1946 the ship returned to Virginia, where she had been originally built, to be stripped of its war armament and refitted for civilian service. The hull had emerged practically unscathed from the conflict, although minor damage had occurred due to a collision with an unexploded naval mine. On December 4, 1946, the ship was recommissioned as the flagship of the United States Lines and received her final tribute from the U.S. Navy. After being refitted, America's postwar career was successful, if uneventful. Finally, it was able to sail the New York City–Cobh–Le Havre–Southampton route that had been delayed by World War II and continued to do so for the next 18 years. She was also repainted in her original United States Lines livery. The renovation in total would cost over $6.8 million, with her passenger capacity reduced slightly from 1,202 to 1,049.

She was both smaller and slower than her fleetmate, SS United States, which debuted in 1952. The great disparities between America and United States prevented them from operating as true running mates like the RMS Queen Mary and RMS Queen Elizabeth of the Cunard Line.

After 1955, the ship continued to sail the US–Europe route through at least 1960 but also frequented tropical ports such as Bermuda and the Caribbean. She also sailed to multiple Mediterranean destinations, most notably Naples. It sailed on fourteen trans-Atlantic voyages in 1962, and eight in 1963, but was laid up in Hoboken for five months starting in September 1963 as a result of a labor dispute. The ship's final voyage with United States Lines would occur on October 27, after which she would be drydocked in the Newport News Shipbuilding yards. She would be sold one month later in November 1964.

=== Chandris line career (1964–1978) ===
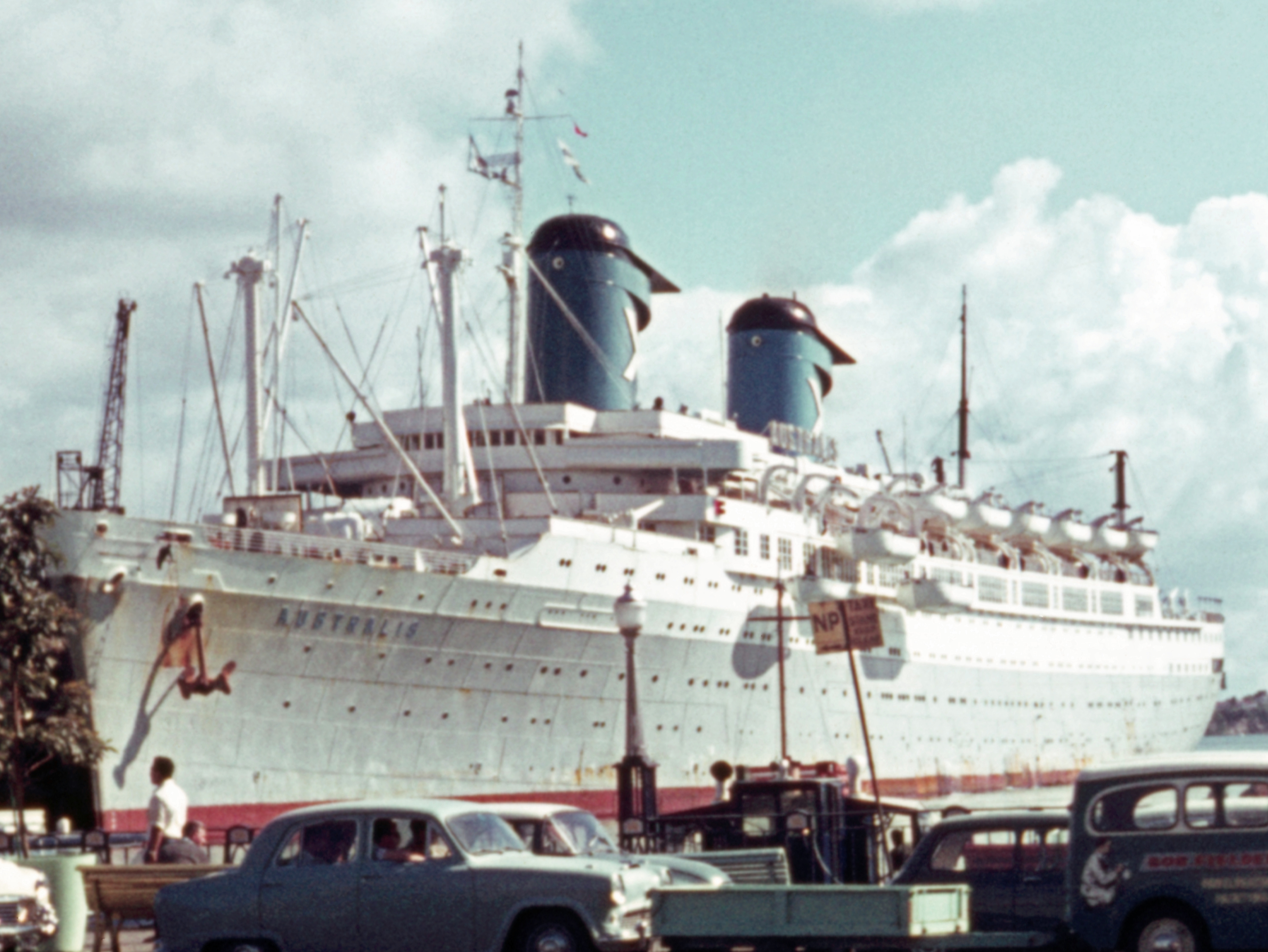
Australis in 1967.

America was sold to the Greek-owned Chandris Group on November 16, 1964. At 24 years of age, the ship was getting older and facing competition from newer, faster ships as well as long-range, even non-stop, air travel. The postwar emigrant run from Europe to Australia had become a lucrative market for passenger ships unable to court the luxury trade.

America, now renamed Australis (meaning "Australia", following the naming convention of Chandris liners), received an extensive refit. Some 350 additional cabins were built and many existing cabins received extra berths, increasing the passenger capacity from fewer than 1,200 to 2,258.

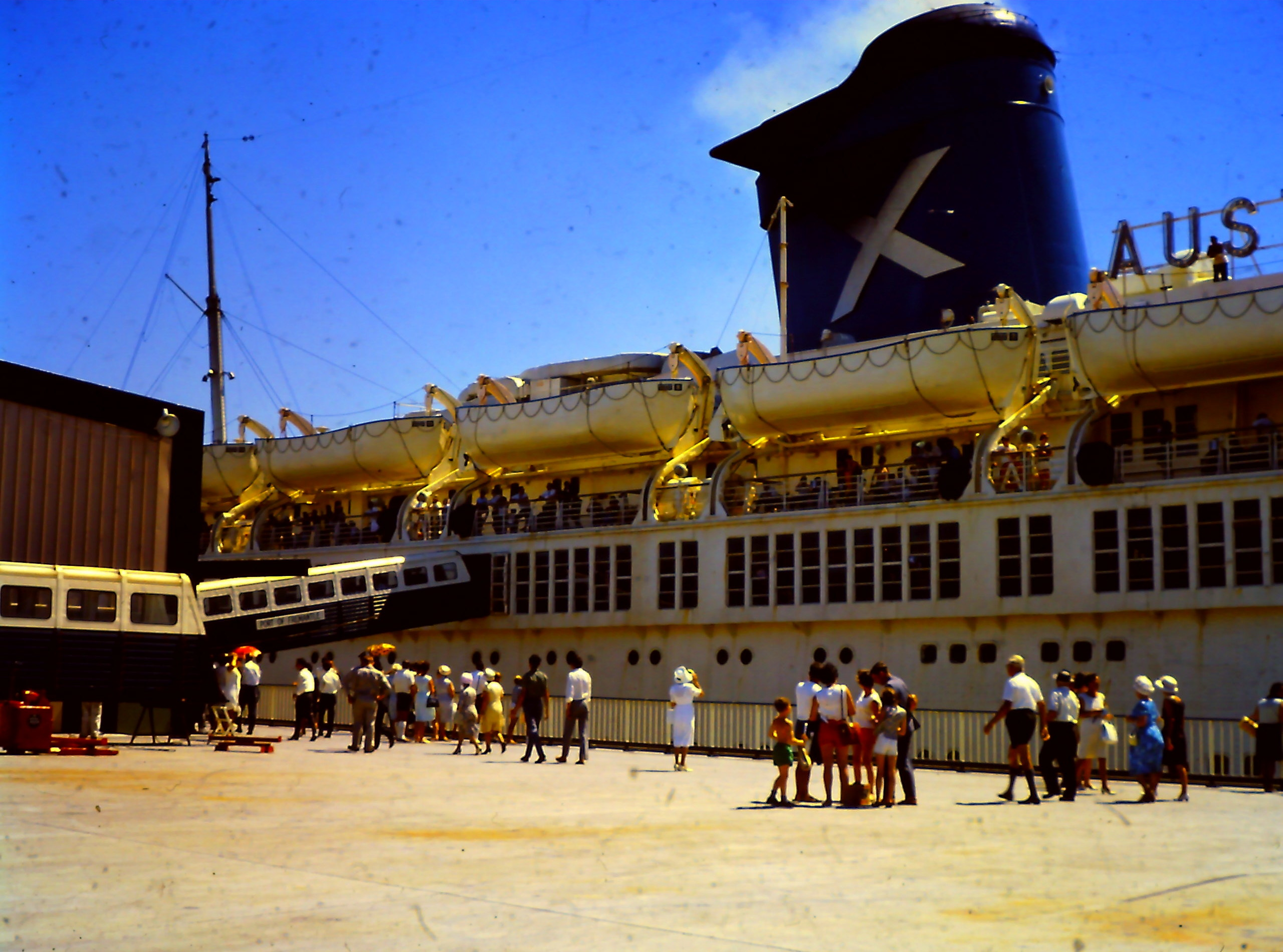
Australis, in Athens in 1967.

Her maiden voyage was from Southampton on August 21, 1965, to Australia and New Zealand via Piraeus and Suez, returning to Southampton via the Pacific and Panama and Miami. Thereafter she sailed regularly from Southampton, occasionally Rotterdam, on this round-the-world route. On the closure of the Suez Canal in 1967, Piraeus was dropped as a port-of-call and she sailed southbound via Cape Town.

On October 22, 1970, a fire broke out in the galley, causing the air-conditioning supply units and exhaust systems to be cut off from the bridge and "B" deck port about 3:45 a.m. It was extinguished the following day, but the voyage was delayed due to repair work.

On July 11, 1974, Australis was involved in a minor collision with the Australian aircraft carrier HMAS Melbourne while in Sydney Harbour. Both ships suffered light damage, but there were no casualties.

"Australis" was the last liner providing a regular service to Australia and New Zealand from Southampton until its final voyage, which departed on November 18, 1977. After arriving at Auckland, she was laid up at Timaru on December 23, 1977. Rising fuel costs, aging infrastructure, and the creation of long-range jetliners caused Chandris to withdraw Australis from the Australia run that year.

Australis features briefly in a 1975 episode of The Sweeney, a British police drama. The episode is entitled "Thin Ice" and features a criminal fleeing the country on the ship.

=== Venture Cruise Lines career (June 1978–August 1978) ===
Following a period of layup at Timaru, New Zealand, Australis was sold to Venture Cruise Lines of New York. Under this new ownership, the ship was renamed America once again in an attempt to capitalize on its American heritage, despite still being registered as a Greek vessel. The ship's hull was painted dark blue and the funnels were repainted in a blue-and-red color scheme.

America as seen on July 1, 1978, passing under the Verrazzano–Narrows Bridge in New York City.

America set sail on her first cruise on June 30, 1978. The ship's refit, however, had not yet been completed by the time of the sailing. As a result, the interiors of the ship were in uninhabitable condition, with piles of soiled linens, worn mattresses, and scattered piles of trash everywhere, together with a pungent smell of kitchen odors, engine oil, and sounds of plumbing back-ups. In addition, water in overhead pipes leaked and dripped all over the decks. Along with these many maintenance issues, attempts to spruce the ship up led to more problems, such as many layers of paint visible on the ship's outer bulkheads as well as on the lifeboat davits and gear. Additionally, the public rooms aboard were carelessly repainted, as seen from how America's stainless-steel trims were covered with paint-brush strokes.

Due to overbooking and her state of disrepair, a number of passengers "mutinied", forcing the captain to return to New York, having only barely passed the Statue of Liberty. Nine hundred and sixty passengers were offloaded upon docking. On a second sailing that day, an additional 200 passengers left via tender at Staten Island.

America finally left for a five-day cruise to Nova Scotia on July 3, 1978. Upon arrival, she was met with $2.5 million in claims from passengers. Further issues saw the cancellation of all further sailings, and America was impounded on 18 July 1978 for non-payment of debts. America also received an inspection score of six out of a possible 100 points by the US Public Health Service.

On August 28, 1978, America was ordered to be sold at auction by the United States district court. Venture Cruise Lines dissolved the same day.

=== Second Chandris career (1978–1980) ===
Chandris Lines repurchased America for $1,000,000 (netting them a profit of $4,000,000) and renamed her Italis. The forward dummy funnel had allegedly become severely corroded due to years of neglect and was removed as part of an ambitious plan to modernize her silhouette by adding streamlined superstructure above the bridge, in addition to possibility refitting the ship with a diesel powerplant, but none of this was carried out. The starboard propeller or propeller shaft was out of alignment, causing severe vibration in the lower decks, leading to multiple passenger complaints. She also retained the dark blue hull adopted by Venture Cruise Lines, while the remaining funnel regained the Chandris "X" logo.

Italis first operated under Chandris as a hotel ship from June 23–July 20, 1979, when it was chartered for the Organisation of African Unity Conference held in Monrovia, Liberia. It then carried out three 14-night cruises from Genoa and Barcelona to Egypt, Israel and the Eastern Mediterranean beginning on July 28, 1979. At the end of this series of cruises, the ship was deemed no longer profitable and was finally laid up in Elefsina Bay, Piraeus, Greece, on September 12, 1979.

=== Uncertain future at Piraeus (1980–1993) ===
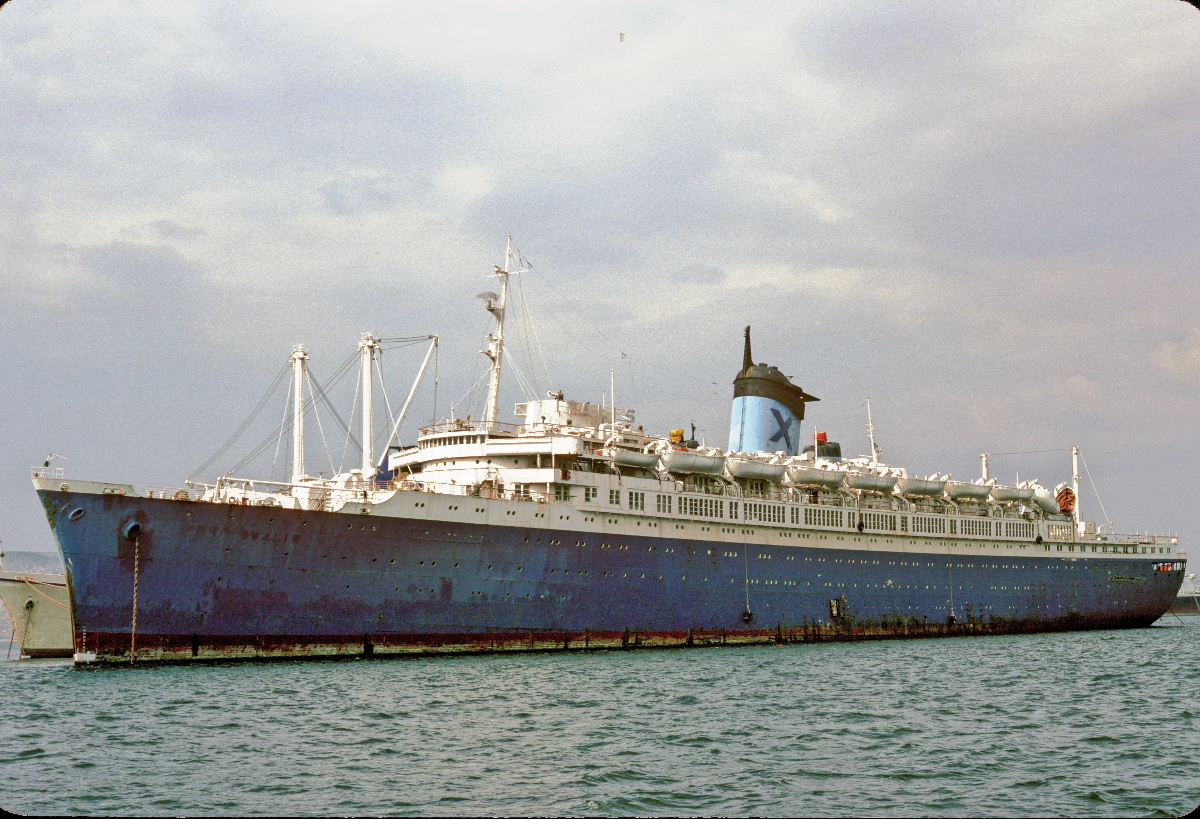
Alferdoss/Noga in Elefsis in 1986.

The ship was next sold to Intercommerce Corporation in 1980 and was renamed Noga. Intercommerce's intention was to convert the ship to an armored prison ship, to be anchored in Beirut, but this never happened due to lack of funding and the Lebanese Civil War.

In September 1984, the ship was sold again to Silver Moon Ferries and was once again renamed, now carrying the name Alferdoss (meaning "paradise" in Arabic). However, the new name was only added to the port bow, with the stern and starboard bow continuing to show the name Noga.

Under the ownership of Intercommerce Corporation and Silver Moon Ferries, the ship would fall into an advanced state of deterioration due a complete lack of maintenance, particularly on the upper decks. In 1988, a burst bilge pipe led to flooding in the engine room and some crew quarters. Due to the quickly occurring port list, the starboard anchor was raised, while the rusted port anchor was cut away, and the ship was quickly beached to prevent the ship from sinking. After being pumped out and hastily repaired, it was returned to its original location and remained there for the next five years.

In the late 1980s, the ship was sold for $2 million for scrap. The scrap merchants made an initial deposit of $1 million and quickly began work. Following the demolition of the lifeboats and lifeboat davits, the scrappers defaulted on payments and pulled out.

Alferdoss would remain in this condition until 1993.

== Wrecked at Fuerteventura and break up (1994–2008) ==
American Star on January 18, 1994, just hours after running aground and 48 hours before it split in two.

In October 1992, the ship was sold yet again, with the intention of being refitted to become a five-star hotel ship off Phuket, in Thailand. Drydocking revealed that, despite the years of neglect, the hull was still in remarkably good condition. It would initially continue to carry the dual name Alferdoss/Noga for the majority of her dry dock, but in August 1993, she was renamed American Star. As part of refitting, her propellers were removed and placed on the deck at the bow, the funnel was painted red, the bridge was painted signal orange just for the tow, and ladders were welded to starboard. Since the vessel was not allowed to pass through the Suez Canal due to its age, the vessel had to go around the Cape of Good Hope in order to get to Thailand.

The ship left Greece under tow on December 22, 1993, but the tow proved impossible due to inclement weather. It then returned to Greece for a few days until the weather calmed down. On December 31, 1993, American Star left Greece for the last time, under tow by Ukrainian tugboat Neftegaz-67.

The hundred-day tow began. Shortly afterward, American Star and Neftegaz-67 sailed into a thunderstorm in the Atlantic. The towlines snapped on January 15, 1994, and six or more crew members were sent aboard American Star to reattach the emergency towlines, which proved unsuccessful. Two other towboats were called to assist Neftegaz 67. On January 17, 1994, the crew aboard American Star was rescued by helicopter. The ship was left adrift for the next few hours. At 6:15 a.m. on January 18, the ship ran aground at Playa de Garcey, off the west coast of Fuerteventura in the Canary Islands.

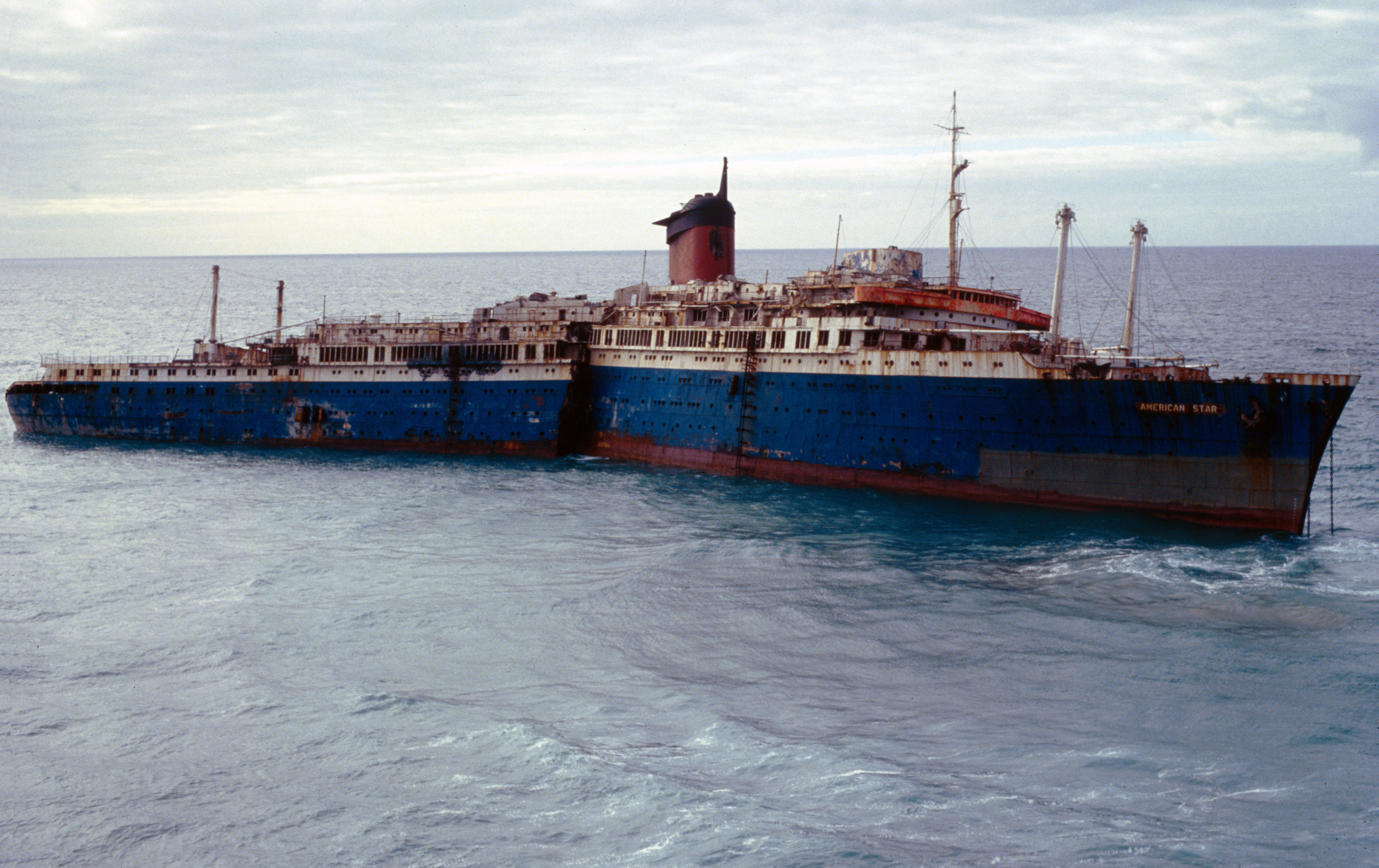
Wreck of American Star in March 1995, 14 months after running aground.

While discussions among the ship's owners, the towing firm, and the companies insuring the ship were going on, the ship was left to nature, with the forward part going aground on a sandbar. Within the first 48 hours of grounding, the pounding surf of the Atlantic broke the ship in two just past the second funnel. The ship was declared a total loss on July 6, 1994.

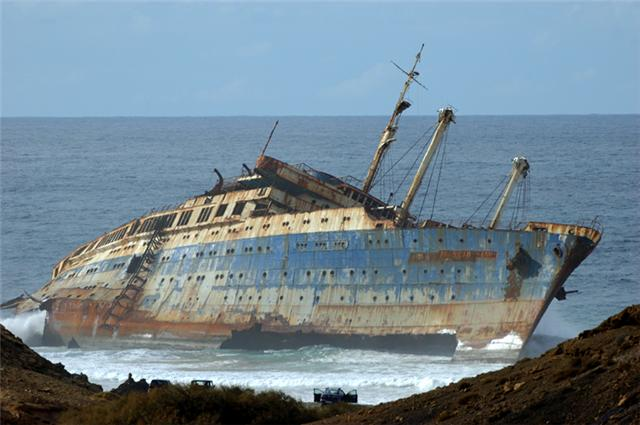
American Star, shortly after the bow collapsed in January 2006.

The 344-foot (105 m) stern section collapsed completely to port and disintegrated by early 1997, while the 379-foot (116 m) bow section remained mostly intact. As months passed, the wreck attracted onlookers and even looters: Locals even created a zipline to the wreck to carry off anything valuable from it. Due to the rough waves and strong current, trying to reach the wreck was very unsafe. Over the years several people trying to swim out to the wreck died while others had to be airlifted off once they got on board. Those that got aboard showed views of the interior and exterior of the wreck such as sparse cabins and water crashing through the blown-out portholes. The only other documentation came from the German documentary Das Wrack der AMERICA in 1999 that showed the interior and exterior of the wreck, including rare views filmed just after the stern section split apart. As part of an art project, the film crew brought generators and floodlights aboard to illuminate the bow section.

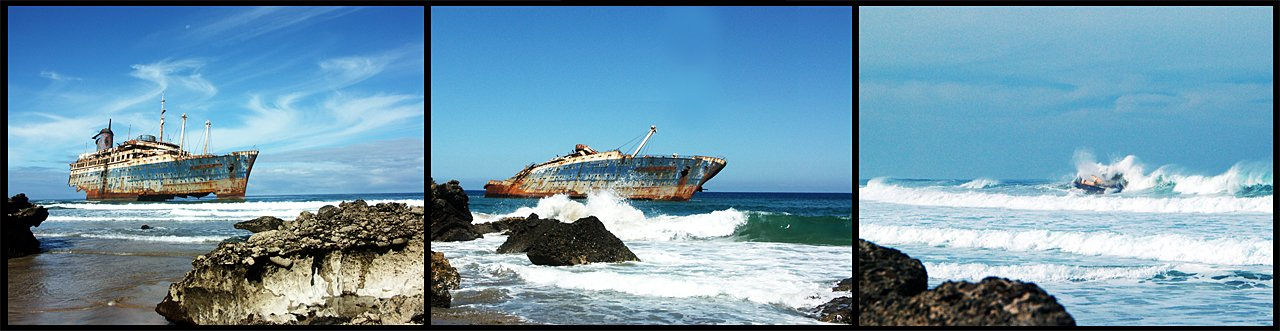
The deterioration of the remains of American Star between 2005 and 2007. The stern broke off and sank in 1996, leaving only the bow section on the sandbar. Later, the ship developed a greater list to port, and the funnel detached and sank. More parts of the ship collapsed until, in 2018, the wreck was visible only during low tide.

By 2004, the bow section remained upright, with the water eroding away cargo hold no. 1, making the bow section extremely top-heavy. In November 2005 the port side of the bow section collapsed, which caused the wreck to assume a much sharper list, and the remaining funnel detached and fell into the ocean around November 13–15, 2005. The collapse of the port side also caused the hull to begin to break up, and by October 2006 the wreck had almost completely collapsed onto its port side.

Around March 20, 2007, the starboard side finally collapsed, causing the bow section to break in half and fall into the sea. By 2008, much of the remaining large fragments had also collapsed.

== Debris field (2008–present) ==
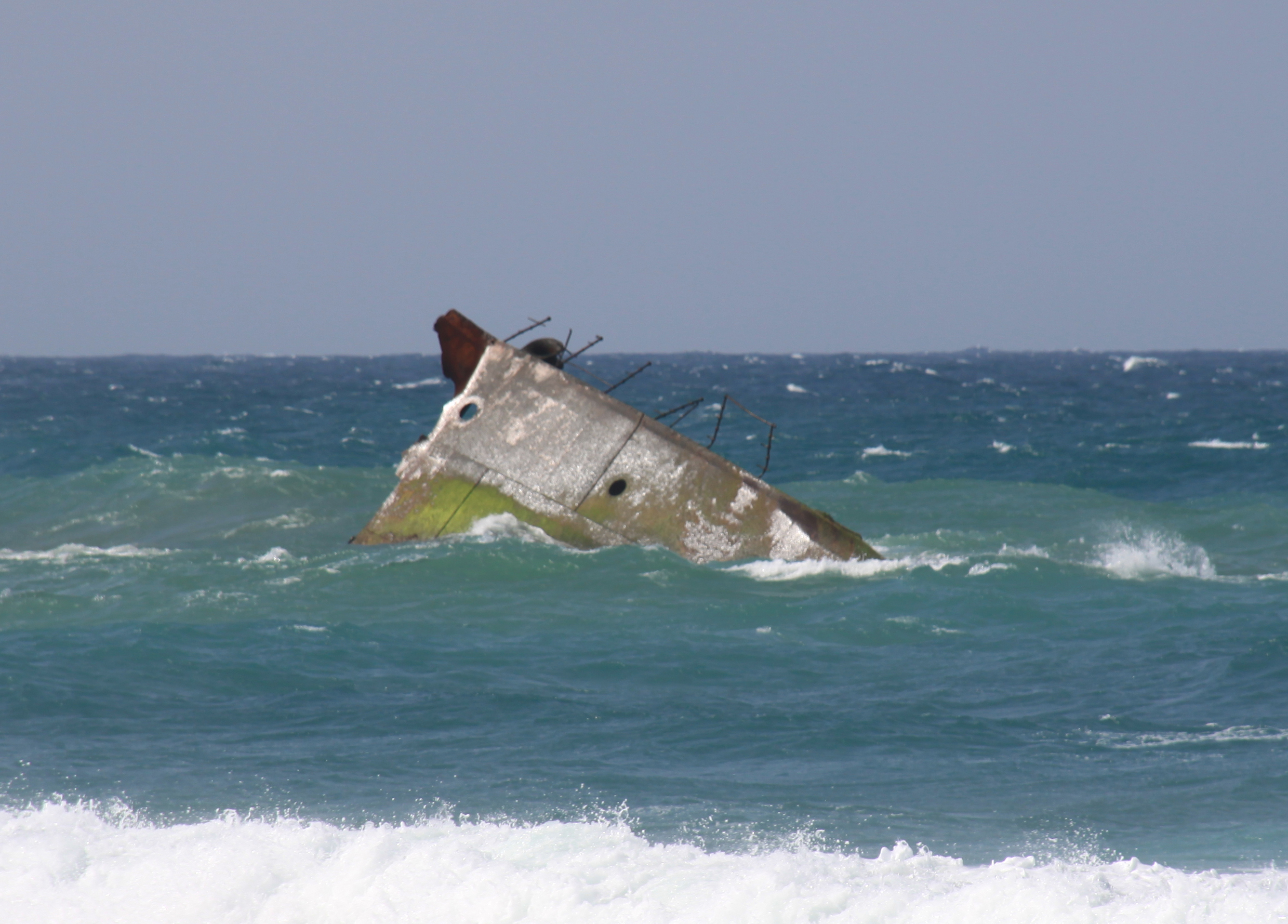
What was left of American Star in 2009.

By 2009, only the foredeck of the ship was left intact. It was noted in 2013 that the wreck was no longer visible on Google Maps. By 2018, only the bow was left visible, and only during low tide. Since April 2024 the wreck, even in low tide, is no longer visible.

In 2019, extensive underwater footage was taken of American Star's debris field by scuba divers during a period of calm seas. In the present day, while the liner's hull and superstructure are now fully disintegrated, there remain recognizable chunks of the vessel half buried in the sand. Anchor chains on the forecastle and a boiler are particularly intact. The detached funnel is also intact. The wreck site is also teeming with marine life.

== See also ==
- SS United States, fleetmate of America
