= SS Bretagne (1951) =

French ocean liner

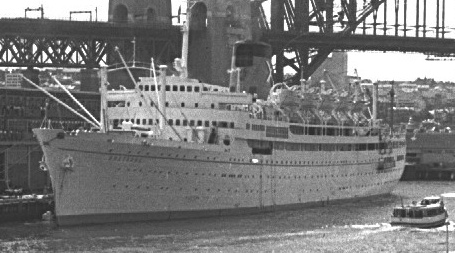
- The SS Bretagne in Sydney Harbour in 1962

History

France
- Name: SS Bretagne
- Operator: Société Générale de Transport Maritimes (1952–1960); Chandris Lines (1960–1963)
- Builder: Penhoet Company, Saint-Nazaire
- Launched: 20 July 1951
- Maiden voyage: 14 February 1952
- Renamed: SS Brittany, 1962
- Fate: Destroyed by fire at Skaramagas, 8 April 1963. Scrapped in Italy.

General characteristics
- Tonnage: 16,335 GRT
- Length: 177 m (580 ft 9 in)
- Beam: 22 m (72 ft 2 in)
- Propulsion: Single-reduction gear steam turbine, twin screws
- Speed: 17 knots (31 km/h; 20 mph) service speed; 19 knots (35 km/h; 22 mph)+ top speed
- Capacity: 1,290 passengers: 149 First class; 167 Tourist class; 606 Third class; 368 Fourth class

SS Bretagne was an ocean liner launched on 20 July 1951 out of Saint-Nazaire; the second of two ships built for the Société Générale de Transport Maritimes (SGTM) which operated passenger lines out of Marseille. Her sister ship Provence was launched a year earlier at Newcastle. Bretagne was constructed with three boilers and Provence with only two, making Provence less capable of increasing speed to counteract possible delays.

== Career with SGTM ==
After two brief shakedown cruises, SS Bretagne began her maiden voyage at Marseille on 14 February 1952, traveling to Genoa, Naples, Barcelona, Dakar, Bahia, Rio de Janeiro, Santos, Montevideo, concluding in Buenos Aires. Bretagne joined Provence in liner and immigration service from Europe to South America. Fine accommodations met First class passengers, but the majority of the ship's berths were for third and fourth class passengers, the latter sleeping in large communal dormitories segregated by gender. These berths were usually filled by poor Italian emigrants seeking a better life in South America.

== Career with Chandris Lines ==
Declining interest in tourism and immigration led SGTM to offer SS Bretagne and SS Provence out to charter. At the same time, Antonios J. Chandris was looking to add a second liner to serve the Chandris Lines route between Greece and Australia. Bretagne was selected by reason of her third boiler and extra speed; 18 November 1960 saw the signing of a year-long charter contract with option to buy. The French seamen's union would continue to serve aboard Bretagne during that year and for six months following purchase. Sister ship SS Provence was chartered then purchased by Costa Line, who renamed her Enrico C..

A major refit for SS Bretagne was undertaken in Genoa in January 1961 in order to eliminate third and fourth class berths and make room for 1,050 tourist class passengers. A second swimming pool was installed and air conditioning was brought to all the passenger areas, not just first class. In May, when the conversion was complete, Bretagne sailed to Boston under a new sub-charter contract with Caribbean Cruise Line to begin cruise ship service between New England and the Caribbean on 9 June 1961. Though passengers weren't too pleased with poor Caribbean Cruise Line service standards, Anthony Chandris was satisfied with the new interior layout. He purchased the Bretagne on 20 September 1961 in Southampton for UK£3 million, two months before his charter contract was to end.

On 22 September 1961, Bretagne sailed as a "Europe Australia Line" ship (a subsidiary of Chandris) from Southampton to Australia by way of Madeira, Cape Town, Durban, Fremantle, Melbourne, arriving in Sydney on 26 October. Quickly turning around, the liner left the next day to visit Brisbane, Bali, Singapore, Colombo, Aden, Port Said, Piraeus, Marseille and Lisbon before arriving again at Southampton. Bretagne made four more voyages to Australia and then was turned over to full Chandris ownership and control in June 1962. The ship was sent to Genoa for further changes including a new ballroom with seating for 500 so that live shows and entertainment could be staged during cruises. At this time the ship was rechristened SS Brittany and was re-staffed by 320 Greek seamen replacing the French.

Brittany began her new career on 20 June 1962 with a series of nine week-long roundtrip cruises between New York and the West Indies, accepting only 500 passengers in the best cabins. These voyages were catered and operated by Chandris in close conjunction with Caribbean Cruise Lines — publicity was favorable in contrast with the previous year. Capacity averaged 95% and plans were made to increase the number of cabins by 110 through the conversion of two refrigerated cargo areas, a process that was undertaken in transit by workmen brought aboard during the New York – Caribbean cruises. The changes would create a single passenger class of 1,500 berths, including the 150 former first class ones, for an extended summer cruise season in 1963.

On 12 September 1962, Brittany left Southampton to resume round-the-world winter service to Australasia. A new feature she offered was an accelerated process for customs and immigration formalities in Wellington, New Zealand by having three New Zealand Customs officials embark at Sydney to start their paperwork early. This innovation was well received.

== Demise ==
On her fourth trip back to Southampton, she stopped at Piraeus in late March 1963 with serious engine trouble, disembarking and flying her passengers onward to their destinations. Brittany was moved to a drydock for overhaul by Hellenic Shipyards in Skaramagas. Repairs were nearing completion on 8 April 1963 when a welder's torch set off a fire that burned quickly out of control. Fears of explosion from her own fuel tanks meant Brittany had to be towed out to harbor and beached to let the fire burn out the next day. The ship was a total loss; her hulk was towed to La Spezia for scrapping in March 1964.

The loss of Brittany led to Chandris Lines purchasing of SS Lurline in September, 1963; that ship was renamed Ellinis.
