= SS Lurline =

SS Lurline may refer to one of the following Matson Navigation Company ships:

- SS Lurline (1908), later Alaska Packers Association ship Chirikof, served as USAT Chirikof during World War II
- SS Lurline (1932), ocean liner
- SS Lurline (1931), the former SS Monterey; named Lurline, 1963–1970
- SS Lurline (2019), container ship
