= Malay =

Malay may refer to:

== Languages ==
- Malayic languages, a branch of closely related Austronesian languages spoken in the Malay Archipelago in Maritime Southeast Asia
  - Malay language or Bahasa Melayu, a major Austronesian language spoken in Indonesia, Malaysia, Brunei and Singapore
    - History of the Malay language, the Malay language from the 4th to the 14th century
    - Indonesian language, the official form of the Malay language in Indonesia
    - Malaysian Malay, the official form of the Malay language in Malaysia, also known as Standard Malay
  - Malay trade and creole languages, a set of pidgin languages
    - Cocos Malay, spoken by the Cocos Malays in the Cocos (Keeling) Islands and Christmas Island, Australia
    - Sri Lanka Malay language, spoken by the Malay race minority in Sri Lanka
  - Bangka Malay, a Malayic language spoken on the island of Bangka, Indonesia
  - Berau Malay, a Malayic language spoken in Berau Regency, Indonesia
  - Brunei Malay, a variety of the Malay language spoken in Brunei, distinct from standard Malay
  - Kedah Malay, a variety of the Malay languages spoken in Malaysia and Thailand
  - Kelantan–Pattani Malay, variety of Malay spoken in State of Kelantan, Malaysia and South Thailand
  - Jambi Malay, a Malayic language primarily spoken by the Jambi Malay people in Jambi, Indonesia
  - Malayic Dayak languages, a dialect chain of Malayic spoken in West and Central Kalimantan, Indonesia
    - Ketapang Malay, spoken by the Malay people in parts of West Kalimantan
  - Negeri Sembilan Malay, a language spoken in Malaysia by the descendants of Minangkabau settlers from Sumatra, related to Standard Malay
  - Pahang Malay, a Malayic language spoken in the Malaysian state of Pahang
  - Perak Malay, spoken within the state of Perak, Malaysia
  - Pontianak Malay, a Malayic language primarily spoken in West Kalimantan, Indonesia
  - Reman Malay, a Malayic language spoken in the Malaysian states of Kedah and Perak
  - Riau Malay language, a dialect continuum of Malayic languages primarily spoken by the Riau Malays in Riau and the Riau Islands in Indonesia
  - Sarawak Malay, a Malayic language native to the State of Sarawak, Malaysia
  - South Barisan Malay, or Central Malay or Middle Malay, collection of closely related Malayic isolects spoken in southwestern Sumatra
  - Terengganu Malay, a Malayic language spoken in far Eastern Malaysia

== Race and ethnic groups ==
- Malay race, a racial category used in the late 19th and early 20th century to describe Austronesian peoples
  - Overseas Malays, people of Malay race ancestry living outside Malay archipelago home areas
  - Cape Malays, a Malay race descent or community in South Africa
  - Cocos Malays, the predominant ethnic group (Malay race descent) of the Cocos (Keeling) Islands, now part of Australia.
  - Sri Lankan Malays, a Malay race descent or community in Sri Lanka
- Malays (ethnic group), the ethnic group located primarily in the Malay peninsula, and parts of Sumatra and Borneo
  - Bruneian Malay people, ethnic Malays in Brunei Darussalam
  - Malaysian Malays, a constitutionally defined group of Muslim Malaysian citizens
  - Malay Indonesian, ethnic Malays in Indonesia
  - Malay Singaporeans, a broad ethnic group defined by the Singaporean government
  - Riau Malays, ethnic Malays who inhabit the area of Riau and the Riau Islands
  - Thai Malays, ethnic Malays in Thailand

== People ==
- Malay (record producer) (born 1978), American music producer
- Jessi Malay (born 1986), American singer in No Secrets
- Malay Ghosh (born 1944), Indian statistician and Distinguished Professor at the University of Florida
- Malay Roy Choudhury (born 1939), Bengali poet and novelist who founded the "Hungryalist Movement" in the 1960s
- Malay Banerjee (born 1955), Indian former cricketer
- Malay Bhowmick (born 1956)
- Andrei Malay (born 1973)
- Charlie Malay (1879–1905), professional baseball player
- Joe Malay (1905–1989), American baseball player
- Alicia Malay, American politician

== Places ==
- Malay, Azerbaijan, a village in Azerbaijan
- Malay, Aklan, a municipality in the Philippines
- Malay, Saône-et-Loire, a commune in the Saône-et-Loire département of France
- Malay Archipelago, the group of islands located between mainland Southeast Asia and Australia
- Malay-le-Grand, a commune in the Yonne département of France
- Malay-le-Petit, a commune in the Yonne département of France
- Malay Peninsula, the geographic area containing Malaysia and Singapore, as well as parts of Myanmar (Burma) and Thailand
- Malay Sheykh-e Ginklik, a village in Golestan Province, Iran
- Malay Town, the unofficial name for an area of Cairns in Australia

=== Nation-states ===
- Peninsular Malaysia, a group of nine states of Malaysia (all located in West Malaysia) which have hereditary rulers
- Malaysia, the modern country that encompasses most of the ancient Malay ethnic group states
- Melayu Kingdom, a historical 7th-century classical Southeast Asian kingdom in Sumatra, Indonesia

== Animals ==
- Malay Game, a breed of chicken originating in Asia
- Malayan tiger (Panthera tigris jacksoni), a subspecies of tiger from the Malay peninsula

== Ships ==
- SS Malay, a Norwegian cargo ship in service from 1959 to 1961 and now known as SS Ambria
- SS Malay, an American oil tanker built in 1921
- USS Malay (SP-735), a United States Navy patrol vessel in commission from 1917 to 1919

== Other uses ==
- Malay alphabet, the more common of the two alphabets used today to write the Malay language
- Malay cuisine, the cuisine of Malay people of Malaysia, Indonesia, Singapore, Brunei, Mindanao and Southern Thailand
- Malay Village, a museum in Geylang, Singapore
- Malay world, geopolitical and sociolinguistic term for the Malay-speaking countries of Southeast Asia, or the homeland of the Austronesian people

== See also ==
- Malay grammar, the body of rules that describe the structure of expressions in the Malay language
- Malay Democrats of the Philippines, a political party of the Philippines
- Malay Falls, Nova Scotia, a community in Canada
- Malayalis, also spelt Malayalee, a Dravidian ethnic group originating in South India
- Malayalamoid languages, a group of Dravidian languages native to South India
  - Malayalam, one of the eleven classical languages of India
- Malaysian (disambiguation)
- Malaya (disambiguation)
- Malays (disambiguation)
- Melee (disambiguation)
