= SS Malay =

SS Malay is the name of the following ships:

- SS Malay (1921), an oil tanker that served through WWII
- SS Malay (1959), launched in 1922 as Ambria, scrapped in 1961

== See also ==
- Malay (disambiguation)
- USS Malay
