= Malaysian names =

Personal names in Malaysia vary greatly according to ethno-cultural group. Personal names are, to a certain degree, regulated by the national registration department, especially since the introduction of the National Registration Identity Card (NRIC).

Malays, Orang Asli, some Bumiputera of Sabah and Sarawak, and Malaysian Indians adopt patronymic naming customs. On the other hand, Malaysian Chinese, some Malays (especially of mixed Arab or Western descent) and Bumiputera of Sabah and Sarawak use family names.

== Malay names ==
Malaysian Malays, as with other Malay populations across Southeast Asia have their own patronymic system similar to Icelandic naming conventions: a personal name (nama daging "flesh name" or nama kerat pusat "navel snip-name"), almost always followed by a "child of" – either bin (from Arabic: بن, meaning 'son of', abbreviated to b.) for men, binti (from بنت, meaning 'daughter of' abbreviated to bt., bte. or bint.) for women – followed by their father's personal name. This name is unchanged with marriage.

If Osman has a son called Musa, Musa will be known as Musa bin Osman. If Musa has a daughter called Aisyah, Aisyah will be known as Aisyah binti Musa following her father. Way of address is as follows:

- For men: Musa bin Osman is addressed as "Mr Musa" (or Encik Musa in Malay). Someone named with a preceding by Mohammed or its variants, or Abdul, are called with that give name too: a Mohammed Hisyam bin Ariffin would be referred by the name Mr Hisyam, an "Abdul Rahman bin Rasyid" would be referred to as Mr Abdul Rahman or Mr Rahman.
- For women: Aisyah binti Musa is Ms./Miss Aisyah (or Puan/Cik Aisyah in Malay).

In general practice, most Malays omit the title Bin or Binti from their names thus the two examples above would be known as Musa Osman and Aisyah Musa. When presented in this way, the second part of the name is often mistaken by foreigners for a family name which is not the case. Most Malays do not use surnames. Addressing someone as just "of [father's name]" is considered very rude, as well as addressing a lady by their spouse. When someone is referred to using only one name, the first given name is always used, never the second.

=== Name origins ===
Prior to the advent of Islam in Malaysia, traditional names were taken from one of a number of languages, or even a combination of two or more elements:

- Malay such as Intan, Melati, Kiambang or Tuah
- Khmer, Siamese or Cham such as Tam, Som or Lai
- Sanskrit or Pali via Javanese such as Wira, Darma, Wati, Ratnasari, Joyo or Kesuma

Arabic names were introduced later along with Islamic names but did not become dominant among commoners until the colonial era. Names from Abrahamic religions with Semitic origins (especially Arabic through Islam) origins are common, for example Adam, Yaakob, Ishak, Bunyamin and Danial and Sarah. In addition, names of Arabo-Hebrew origins that are seldom used by Muslim Arabs are widespread among Malays, such as the female names of Saloma and Rohana. Persian such as Jihan, Mirza or Shah are also common.

First generation Javanese Malaysians, i.e. those part of the Javanese diaspora that naturalize their Malaysian nationality, tend to preserve their given Javanese names compared to later second and third generations born as Malaysians, as those generations are given Arabic names perceived to be "Malay" as a marker of assimilation into the government recognized "Malay" demographic.

Although traditional Malay names were still widely used for centuries afterward, they are now primarily confined to rural areas, even moreso with regulations introduced by Malaysia's National Registration Department not only disallowing names deemed to bring negative meanings, such as Pendek which means short. The Department additionally bans names with the meaning of colors, animals and natural phenomena. This effectively renders many traditional names illegal including Puteh or Putih (white or fair-skinned), Bulan (moon), Suria (sun), Rimau (tiger) and Awan (cloud). Because of these restrictions, the vast majority of Malays today tend to favour Arabic names.

Since the 20th century, names from the following languages are common as well:

- Greek or Latin such as Maria, Marina, Johana, and Tiara (from Latin tiara "crown, turban")
- English, such as Orked (from the English "orchid") or Ros (from "rose")

Names taken from other languages can risk bearing a different negative Malay meaning when the language of origin is relatively unknown to the general public. For example, the daughter of actor Scha Alyahya and Awal Ashaari was named Lara Alana from the Latin lara "protector" but lara in Malay coincidentally means "pain".

In the past it was uncommon for a Malay to have more than one personal name, but in modern times Malay names may consist of two and sometimes three personal names. Some are taken from public figures around the world, such as Mohammad Rifae Zidane, whose third personal name is taken from the famous footballer. As of January 2022, the longest recorded name for a Malaysian is "Princess Aura Nurr Ermily Amara Auliya Bidadari Nawal El-Zendra", comprising 63 letters including spaces.

=== Nicknames ===
Malays of the Peninsular have a unique convention of nicknames or "cradle names" (timang-timangan) based on the order of their birth:

- the eldest born (sulung) is Pak/Mak Long
- the second (tengah, 'middle') is Pak/Mak Ngah
- third (alang, 'middling'), is Pak/Mak Lang
- fourth (panjang, 'long') is Pak Panjang/Mak Anjang
- fifth (pandak, 'short') is Pak/Mak Andak
- sixth (muda, 'young') is Pak/Mak Uda
- the youngest (bongsu) is Pak/Mak Su.

These appelations may become native names in their own right, like "Busu bin Sulaiman", Long Jaafar, Ngah Ibrahim and so on.

=== Second personal names or double names ===
Another feature in Malay names, which is very common, is the existence of second personal names or double names. This seems to have been developed in response to the use of very popular Muslim names, like Muhammad and Ahmad for men, and Nur and Siti for women. Bearers of these names, and their variants, often add a more distinctive second name, like Muhammad Osman or Nur Mawar. The patronym is then added after these.

The popular first elements in double Malay male names are:

- Muhammad/Mohammad/Mohammed (often abbreviated to Muhd., Mohd., Md. or simply M.)
- Mat – the Malay variant of Muhammad. Mat is also the casual spoken form of names ending with -mad or -mat such as Ahmad, Rahmat, Samad, etc.
- Mamat - another variety of Muhammad
- Ahmad
- Awang (Commonly used in Kelantan, Terengganu, Sarawak, Brunei and Kutai)

The most common first elements in double Malay female names are:

- Nur/Nurul/Noor/Nor
- Siti/Ct
- Dayang (Commonly used in Brunei, Kutai and Sarawak)

A special case of double names for men is the use of theophoric names attached with "Abdul". Following Arabic naming practices, Abdul simply means 'servant of' and must be followed by one of the names of God in the Qur'an; for example Abdul Haqq means 'servant of the Truth'.

Thus, Osman may have another son called Abdul Haqq, who is known as Abdul Haqq bin Osman, or Abdul Haqq Osman. Then he, in turn, may have a daughter called Nur Mawar, who is known as Nur Mawar binti Abdul Haqq, or Nor Mawar Abdul Haqq. It is often common to drop the first element in these double names, even if it is Abdul, and so the examples could be known as Haqq Osman and Mawar Haqq.

=== Malay titles ===
==== Hereditary titles ====
In different parts of, but not exclusive to, Malaysia, traditionally inherited (patrilineally) Malay titles and sometimes matrilineally, are used and often incorporated into the naming system as the first part of double names. Most of those with these titles are descended from royalty or nobility.

The examples of inherited titles are:

by Patrilineal Royal descent (Malay)

- Tunku (male and female)
- Tengku (male and female)
- Raja (male and female)

by Patrilineal Royal descent (Malay)

- Engku (male and female)
- Ungku (male and female)
- Tunku (male and female)
- Ku (male and female)

by Patrilineal and Matrilineal Noble descent (Arabic-Malay)

- Syed/Sharifah (for male and female, respectively) — indicating direct patrilineal descent from the family of Muhammad.
- Mior (for male only) — indicating direct matrilineal descent from the family of Muhammad.

by Patrilineal Royal descent (Malay-Mon-Khmer)

- Yang (male and female)
- Long (male and female)

by Patrilineal Royal descent (Acheh-Malay)

- Teuku (male)
- Cut (female)

by Patrilineal Royal descent (Buginese-Malay and Makassarese-Malay)

- Daeng (male and female)
- Andi (male and female)
- Tok (male and female)
- Raja (male and female)
- Tengku (male and female)
- Pangiran (male and female)
- Awangku/Pangiran Muda/Pangiran Anak/Pengiran, Dayangku (commonly found in Brunei and Sarawak, for male and female, denoting Bruneian-Malay aristocratic descent).
- Tuan (used more generally as a respectful term of address for men, like 'sir')
- Awang/Dayang, Abang/Dayang or Dayangku (used in Brunei, Kutai and Sarawak, for male and female, respectively)

by Patrilineal Noble descent (Thai-Malay and Javanese-Malay)

- Wan (male and female)
- Megat (male)
- Puteri (female)
- Nik (male and female)
- Che (male and female)
- Tun (male and female)
- Raden (male and female)

All hereditary titles are controlled and regulated as well as registered by the Malaysian National Registration Department and must appear in the National Registration Identity Cards (NRIC), passports as well as all official documents. A person may not in any circumstances be denied or stripped of his or her hereditary titles and persons with no evidence of inheritance are not allowed to carry these titles in accordance to local customs as well as the national registration naming regulations.

==== Non-hereditary titles ====
The titles above should not be confused with those given by special award which are non-hereditary, like 'Datuk', 'Tan Sri' and 'Tun'.

These titles are usually awarded by the Sultans of the recipients' respective states as well as the Yang Dipertuan Agong and the state Yang Dipertua as recognition for their contributions and services to the nation and the respective states. For example, the title 'Datuk' is given to Malaysians of all races as an honorary title. An example is Datuk Lee Chong Wei, a famous badminton player who was awarded the title as recognition to his achievement in becoming the third Malaysian to win a silver Olympic medal 2008 Beijing Summer Olympics. If the recipient is a man, his wife is automatically bestowed with the title 'Datin' but not in reverse.

The title 'Tun' is reserved for nationally important persons, like the fourth Prime Minister of Malaysia Tun Mahathir bin Mohamad. He was given the title after his resignation at 2003.

For an example of a complex name, one former Prime Minister of Malaysia has the full name Dato' Seri Mohd Najib bin Tun Haji Abdul Razak, where 'Dato' Seri' is a Malay title of honour, 'Mohd Najib' is his personal name (often further abbreviated to 'Najib'), 'bin' introduces his father's titles and names, Tun is a higher honour, 'Haji' denotes his father as a pilgrim to Mecca, and 'Abdul Razak' is his father's personal name (often abbreviated to Razak). The entire name has various shorter forms, like 'Mohd Najib Tun Abdul Razak', 'Najib Tun Razak' and 'Najib Razak').

In olden times, the first group of Chinese people in Malaysia used to be held in high regard by Malays. Some Malays in the past may have taken the word "Baba", referring to Chinese males, and put it into their name, when this used to be the case. This is not followed by the younger generation, and the current Chinese Malaysians do not have the same social status as they previously had.

==== Haji or Hajjah ====
If someone has been on the Hajj, the pilgrimage to Mecca, they may be called Haji for men or Hajjah for women. Thus, if Musa Bin Osman went on the Hajj, he could be called Haji Musa Bin Osman, and his daughter Aisyah might be called Aisyah Binti Haji Musa. If Aisyah herself had completed the hajj, her name would be Hajjah Aisyah Binti Haji Musa. The titles can also be shortened in writing to 'Hj.' for Haji and 'Hjh' for Hajjah.

== Chinese names ==
=== Format ===
Traditional Chinese names (姓名) are used by the Malaysian Chinese. The surname is usually first, followed by the given name. This makes Malaysian Chinese the only major ethnic group who have surnames out of the 3 in Malaysia. The Chinese surname (姓氏), passed down from father to children, usually consists of 1 word, with 2-word long surnames being less common. It is a reflection of what clan in China they originated from. Conversely, the Chinese given name (名字) usually consist of 2 words, whereas 1-word long given names are less common. Sometimes, the given name is hyphenated. Some examples are Chua Hock Beng, Foo Li-Leen, Au Yong Chee Keong, and Teoh Eng. Within these, the surnames are Chua, Foo, Au Yong, and Teoh, and the given names are Hock Beng, Li-Leen, Chee Keong, and Eng.

The given name may contain a generation name (字辈). This is usually a word shared by siblings in a generation, often the first word of a given name. For example, a father and siblings may have Chun in their given names: Chun Kiat, Chun Fen, and Chun Keong; whereas his children may have Yu: Yu Xuan, Yu Heng, and Yu Xiang.

When used in other cultures, such as on Western documents, the name is sometimes formatted such that the surname is at the end, for example Foo Li Leen being shown as Li Leen Foo.

==== Western names ====
Many Malaysian Chinese, especially the younger generations, have a Western personal name (usually English e.g., Denise), and some use this in preference to their Chinese given name. These are mostly used by Chinese Malaysian Christians or those who primarily speak English. It is most commonly put before the Chinese name, with other formats being less common, such as the Western name being at the end, or Western name - Chinese given name - surname on some official documents. For example, Denise Lau Sook Ying would be the most common format, whereas Lau Sook Ying Denise and Denise Sook Ying Lau would be seen less.

In practice, only one of the given names (either the Western or Chinese name) is used in conversation. Chinese Malaysian Muslims may use Arabic given names while some use Arabic-derived Chinese names, such as Firdaus Fong Siew Chong.

=== Romanisation ===
As no formal system of romanisation is imposed in Malaysia, names are often romanised according to the judgment of the registration clerk or the preference of the proposer. Hence, romanisation errors and different variations are not uncommon, resulting in unusual names. Romanisation based on other Chinese varieties (e.g., Cantonese, Hokkien, Hakka) used to be the norm, but given names using Pinyin (based on Standard Mandarin Chinese) has become more common since the 1980s, although not for surnames. For example, 陈 is more commonly romanised as Tan (Hokkien), Ding or Ting (Foochow and Henghua), Chin (Hakka), Chan (Cantonese and Kwongsai), and Tang (Teochew), whereas Chen (Mandarin Pinyin) is less common. Some surnames that sound different in Mandarin, may have the same romanisation in Malaysia, as they may be pronounced the same in other Chinese varieties. For example, Ng may refer to 黄 in Hokkien and Teochew, or 吴 in Hakka and Cantonese.

As parents prefer their children to have the same romanised surname as their father, names such as Tan Jia Ling, where Tan is in Hokkien but the given name Jia Ling is in Mandarin Pinyin, are becoming a common form of naming style these days.

==== Top Chinese surnames ====
Sources:

- 陈 - Tan, Chan, Chin, Ding, Ting, Chen
- 林 - Lim, Lam
- 李 - Lee, Li
- 黄 - Wong, Ng, Goh, Ooi, Wee, Bong
- 王 - Wong, Ong, Wang
- 温 - Oon, Woon, Wan
- 张 - Chong, Choong, Teo, Teoh, Cheong, Cheung, Chiang, Tiong, Zhang
- 叶 - Yap, Yip, Yeap
- 杨 - Yeoh, Yeo, Yang, Yong
- 刘 - Lau, Liew, Low, Liu

=== Examples ===
The following examples are of notable Chinese Malaysians.

Full name	Western name	Surname	Chinese given name	Chinese Characters
Lee Chong Wei		Lee	Chong Wei	李宗伟 (Pinyin: lǐ zōng wěi)
Michelle Yeoh Choo Kheng	Michelle	Yeoh	Choo Kheng	杨紫琼 (Pinyin: yáng zǐ qióng)
Hannah Yeoh Tseow Suan	Hannah	Yeoh	Tseow Suan	杨巧双 (Pinyin: yáng qiǎo shuāng)
Jimmy Choo Yeang Keat	Jimmy	Choo	Yeang Keat	周仰杰 (Pinyin: zhōu yǎng jié)
Amber Chia Lee Peng	Amber	Chia	Lee Peng	谢丽萍 (Pinyin: xiè lì píng)

=== Transliteration of non-Chinese names ===
Malay and Indian names are most often transliterated in Mandarin Chinese. The common Malay titles Tun, Tunku, Datuk, Dato' Seri, Tan Sri, and Haji are transliterated as 敦, 东姑, 拿督, 拿督斯里, 丹斯里, and 哈吉 respectively. For example, the name of former prime minister Tun Dr. Mahathir bin Mohamad in Chinese is 敦马哈蒂尔·宾·穆罕默德, or commonly shortened to 敦马.

== Indian names ==
Officially, Malaysian Indians use a patronymic naming system combining their traditional Indian names with some Malay words, while others use Tamil, Telugu, Malayalam, or Sanskrit names. A man's name would consist of his personal name followed by the Malay phrase anak lelaki, meaning 'son of', and then his father's name. A woman's name would consist of her personal name followed by the phrase anak perempuan meaning 'daughter of', and then her father's name. The Malay patronymic phrase is often abbreviated to a/l ('son of') or a/p ('daughter of') and then their father's name. In many circumstances, the intervening Malay is omitted, and the father's name follows immediately after a person's given name.

Following traditional practice from South India, the father's name is sometimes abbreviated to an initial and placed before the personal name. Thus, a man called Anbuselvan whose father is called Ramanan may be called Anbuselvan anak lelaki Ramanan (formal), Anbuselvan a/l Ramanan (as on his government identification card), Anbuselvan Ramanan or R. Anbuselvan. Whereas, his daughter Mathuram would be called Mathuram anak perempuan Anbuselvan (formal), Mathuram a/p Anbuselvan (as on her government identification card), Mathuram Anbuselvan or A. Mathuram. Although not recorded officially, a South Indian woman may use her husband's personal name instead of her father's name after marriage. For example, Letchumy a/p Subramaniam who married to Kumar a/l Ganesan may identify herself as Letchumy Kumar or simply Mrs Kumar.

Indian Malaysian Muslims, like ethnic Malays, use Arabic names or names of their own languages such as Mohd Hasaan Kutty, and Noor Faridah Begum Merican. Meanwhile, Christian names with a touch of Indian influence and own family name or father's name such as David Vijay Panicker, and Elizabeth Shanti Arumugam may also be used by Indian Malaysian Christians.

Sikh Malaysian usage follows either the western fashion of personal names followed by the family name or more commonly the South Indian pattern with the personal name followed with the phrase "anak lelaki" (son of) for males and "anak perempuan (daughter of) for females. Examples of Sikh western-style usage where their full personal names followed by their family (or clan) names are: Harjit Singh Gill (for a male) or Asha Kaur Dhillon (for a female). Examples of usage in the South Indian fashion would be: Harjit Singh a/l Balwinder Singh (for a male) and Asha Kaur a/p Jagdeep Singh (for a female).

== Names of members of other groups ==
Peninsular Orang Asli and Sarawakian Bumiputra use the Malay word anak ('child of') to form their patronymics regardless of an individual's sex, for example, Sagong anak Tasi and Narang anak Meringgai. However, most of the new generation indigenous people in Sabah and Sarawak who live in town areas and who practice Christianity as a religion, tend to have a Christian first name, followed by ethnic name, surname or father's name. For example, John anak Gani (Gani being the father's name), Melissa Melanie Rawing (Rawing being a surname) and Thomas Gimbang Kitingan (Gimbang being an ethnic name and Kitingan being a surname).

Some Sabah and Sarawak Bumiputra have patronymics in the same fashion as Malays, using bin or binti, while others have patrilineal surnames which are handed down unchanged from generation to generation.

Minangkabau descendants use clan and tribal names passed down matrilineally.

Kristang people usually have Portuguese, or, at least, more European-sounding names, including inherited family names such as Joseph Gabriel Monterio, Christina Alice Fernandez, and so on. In fact, Arabs, Persians, and Portuguese have common denominator in influence in names: Fatima, Omar, and Soraya. These names are common in Portugal given by Arab, and Persian influences.

== See also ==
- Malay styles and titles
