= Siti (given name) =

Siti or Sitti is a feminine given name of Indonesian and Malay origin. It is derived from the Arabic honorific sayyidati, meaning "lady". "Sayyidatina" translates to "our lady" in English. It is often used to refer to a respected woman, particularly in religious or honorific contexts. Notable people with this name include:

== Given name ==
- Siti (king), Nubian king
- Siti Aminah Aching (born 1962), Malaysian politician
- Siti Adiyati (born 1951), Indonesian artist
- Siti Zalina Ahmad (born 1979), Malaysian lawn bowler
- Siti Hasmah (1926–2026), Malaysian physician and civil servant
- Siti Aisyah Alias (born 1966), Malaysian marine researcher
- Siti Alnfor (1997–2021), Sudanese nurse and women's human rights defender
- Siti Noor Iasah Mohamad Ariffin (born 1989), Malaysian paralympic athlete
- Siti Mirza Nuria Arifin (born 1953), Indonesian doctor, businesswoman, singer, and beauty pageant
- Siti Faizah Abdul Azis (born 1975), Malaysian politician
- Siti Badriah (born 1991), Indonesian singer
- Siti Nurbaya Bakar (born 1956), Indonesian politician
- Siti Noordjannah Djohantini (born 1958), Indonesian Islamic scholar
- Siti Elizad (born 1984), Malaysian actress
- Siti Nur Adibah Akma Mohd Fuad (born 1999), Malaysian cyclist
- Siti Ashah Ghazali (born 1962), Malaysian politician
- Siti Nafisatul Hariroh (born 2001), Indonesian weightlifter
- Siti Hartinah (1923–1996), Indonesian first lady
- Sitti Djalia Hataman (born 1977), Filipina politician
- Siti Rahmiati Hatta (1926–1999), Indonesian Second Lady
- Siti Noor Halimi Hussain (born 1984), Malaysian futsal player
- Siti Aishah Shaik Ismail (born 1983), Malaysian politician
- Siti Noor Radiah Ismail (born 1993), Malaysian Paralympian
- Siti Zainon Ismail (born 1949), Malaysian author
- Siti Munirah Jusoh (born 1987), Malaysian squash player
- Siti Kamaluddin (born 1979), Bruneian filmmaker and musician
- Siti Kasim (born 1963), Malaysian human rights lawyer and activist
- Siti Kassim (born 1961), Comorian politician
- Siti Rahmah Kassim (1926–2017), Malaysian independence fighter and politician
- Siti Wan Kembang, Malaysian legendary queen
- Siti Mariah Mahmud (born 1958), Malaysian politician
- Siti Zuraina Abdul Majid (born 1944), Malaysian historian and archaeologist
- Siti Sukaptinah Sunaryo Mangunpuspito (1907–1991), Indonesian women's rights activist and politician
- Siti Nugraha Mauludiah (born 1967), Indonesian diplomat
- Siti Mastura Muhammad (born 1989), Malaysian politician
- Siti Musdah Mulia (born 1958), Indonesian women's right activist
- Siti Munjiyah (1896–1955), Indonesian women's movement activist
- Siti Hartati Murdaya (born 1946), Indonesian criminal
- Siti Mwinyi (born 1932), Tanzanian First Lady
- Siti Nordiana (born 1984), Malaysian celebrity
- Siti Nurhaliza (born 1979), Malaysian singer-songwriter
- Siti Nurshuhaini (born 2004), Malaysian badminton player
- Siti Oetari (1905–1986), Indonesian First Lady
- Siti Wuryan Prayitno (1933–2020), Indonesian dentist and professor
- Siti Qomariyah (born 1967), Indonesian politician
- Siti Fadia Silva Ramadhanti (born 2000), Indonesian badminton player
- Siti Rozaimeriyanty (born 1974), Bruneian architect and politician
- Siti Ruhani (born 1987), Malaysian hockey player
- Siti Rukiah (1927–1996), Indonesian author
- Siti Hardiyanti Rukmana (born 1949), Indonesian politician
- Siti binti Saad (1880–1950), Tanzanian singer
- Siti Saerah (1928–2013), Bruneian royalty
- Siti Safiyah, Malaysian ten-pin bowler
- Siti Saleha (born 1990), Malaysian actress and model
- Siti Sarah (1984–2021), Malaysian singer and actress
- Siti Setiati (born 1961), Indonesian physician, university administrator, and professor
- Siti Masitha Soeparno (born 1964), Indonesian businesswoman and politician
- Siti Chamamah Soeratno (1941–2026), Indonesian Islamic scholar
- Siti Zaharah Sulaiman (1949–2024), Malaysian politician
- Siti Fadilah Supari (born 1949), Indonesian politician
- Siti Aisyah We Tenriolle (died 1919), Indonesian monarch
- Siti Norma Yaakob (1940–2026), Malaysian judge
- Siti Berenee Yahaya, Malaysian politician
- Siti Zailah Mohd Yusoff (born 1963), Malaysian politician
