= Malays =

Malays may refer to:

- Malays (ethnic group), an ethnic group on the Malay Peninsula and throughout Southeast Asia
  - Bruneian Malays, Malays in Brunei
  - Malaysian Malays, Malays in Malaysia
  - Malay Indonesians, Malays in Indonesia
  - Malay Singaporeans, Malays in Singapore
  - Filipinos of Malay descent, Malays in the Philippines
  - Thai Malays, Malays in Thailand
  - Cocos Malays, Malays on Australia's Cocos Islands
  - Overseas Malays, the Malay diaspora to other areas of the world
    - Sri Lankan Malays, Malays in Sri Lanka
    - Cape Malays, Malays in South Africa
- Malay race, a loose term used in the late 19th century and early 20th century to describe the Austronesian peoples

== See also ==
- Malay (disambiguation)
- Malaya (disambiguation)
- Malaysian (disambiguation)
