= Malaya =

Malaya or Malayan may refer to:

== Political entities ==
- British Malaya (1826–1957), a loose collection of the British colony of the Straits Settlements and the British protectorates of the Malay States
- Malayan Union (1946–1948), a post-war British colony consisting of all the states and settlements in British Malaya except Singapore
- Federation of Malaya (1948–1963), the successor to the Malayan Union, which gained independence within the Commonwealth of Nations in 1957
- Peninsular Malaysia (1963–present), the successor to the Federation of Malaya

== Science ==
- Malaya (fly), a genus of mosquitoes that includes Malaya genurostris
- Megisba malaya, a butterfly commonly called the Malayan

== Organisations ==
- Malayan Insurance, a Philippine life insurance company
- Malayan Airways Limited, a defunct regional airline
  - Malaysia Airlines, its legal successor
- Maybank, a Malaysian universal bank officially known as Malayan Banking

== People ==
- Malaya Akulukjuk (born 1915?), Canadian Inuk artist
- Malaya Drew (born 1987), American actress
- Malaya Marcelino, Canadian politician
- Oxana Malaya (born 1983), Ukrainian mental patient known for her dog-like childhood behaviour
- Malaya (born 1980), a founding member of the Chilean-Argentine group Zona Ganjah

== Other uses ==
- University of Malaya, Kuala Lumpur, Malaysia
- HMS Malaya, a Royal Navy battleship which served in both world wars
- Operation Malaya, a police investigation begun in 2006 in Spain
- Malaya (film), a 1949 American war film set in Japanese-occupied Malaya
- Malaya, a 1961 documentary film produced by Malayan Film Unit (later Filem Negara Malaysia)
- Malaya (newspaper), a newspaper in the Philippines
- Malaya (album), an album by Filipino singer, Moira Dela Torre
- Malaya Mountains, a place in Hindu mythology
- Malaya Kuonamka, a river in Yakutia, Russia
- Malaya-sundari, a character in the 11th-century Indian story collection Shringara-manjari-katha

== See also ==
- M'alayah, a dance of East Africa and Eastern Arabia
- Malay (disambiguation)
- Malabar (disambiguation), a region of India also known as Malaya and Malai
- Malayalam, a Dravidian language of Kerala, India
- Malayala Manorama, a Malayalam-language newspaper based in Kerala, India
- Malayala Rajyam, an Indian Malayalam-language newspaper
- Malays (disambiguation)
  - Malays (ethnic group)
- Malaysia, a federal constitutional monarchy in Southeast Asia
- Malaysian (disambiguation)
- Malai (disambiguation)
