= Malaysian =

Malaysian may refer to:

- Something from or related to Malaysia, a country in Southeast Asia
- Malaysian Malay, a dialect of Malay language spoken mainly in Malaysia
- Malaysians, people who are identified with the country of Malaysia regardless of their ethnicities. Most Malaysians are of Malay, Chinese and Indian descent.
  - Malaysian diaspora, Malaysian emigrants and their descendants around the world
- Malaysian cuisine, the food and food culture of Malaysia
- Malaysian culture, culture associated with Malaysia
- The call sign and colloquial name of Malaysia Airlines

== See also ==
- Malaysian names, names as used by the Malaysian people
- Malays (disambiguation)
- Malaya (disambiguation)
- Malay (disambiguation)
