= Ambria =

Ambria may refer to:

- SS Ambria, a German cargo ship in service 1922–25
- Ambria (Star Wars), a minor planet in the sci-fi series
