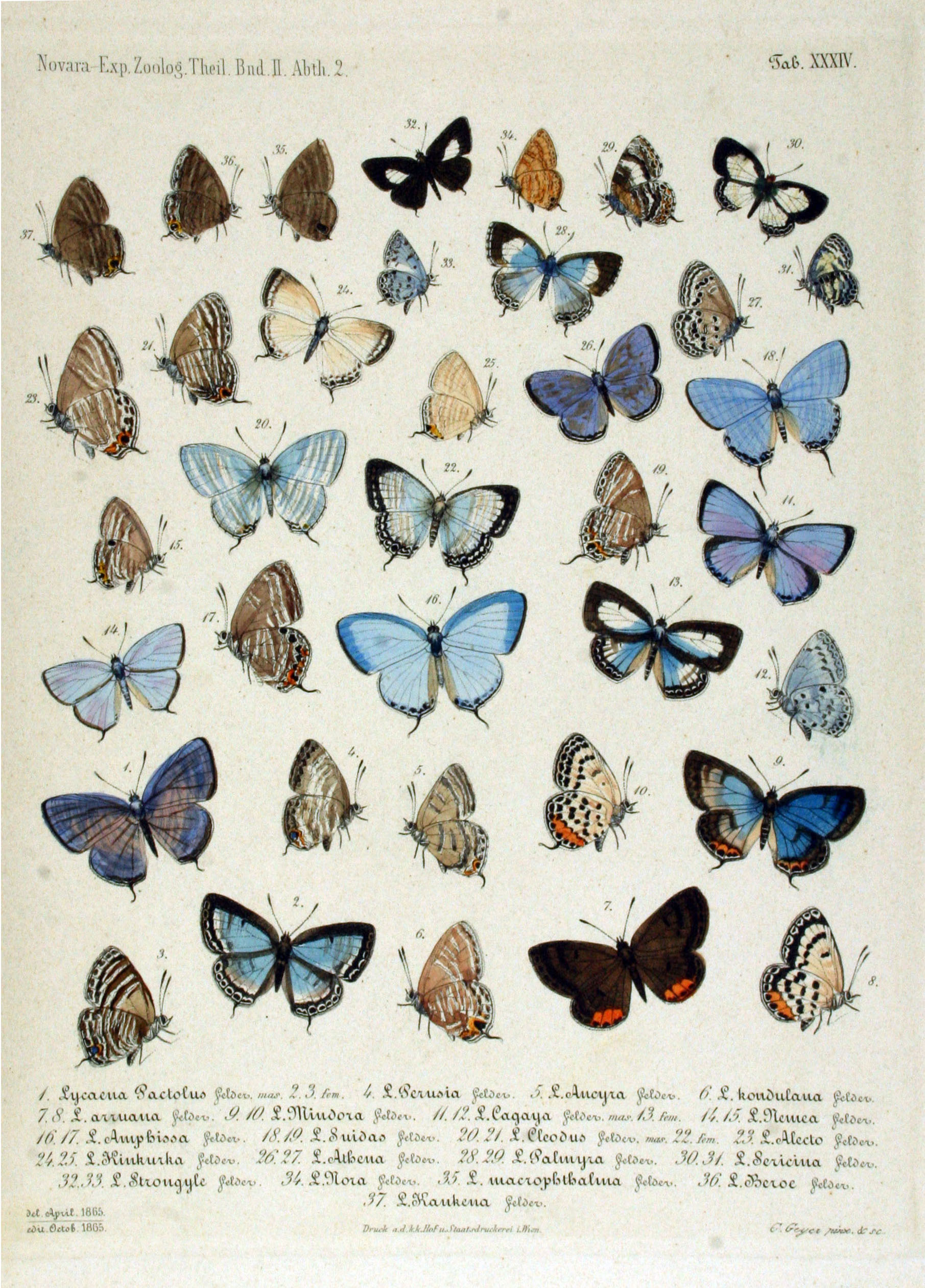
- Megisba strongyle

Scientific classification
- Domain: Eukaryota
- Kingdom: Animalia
- Phylum: Arthropoda
- Class: Insecta
- Order: Lepidoptera
- Family: Lycaenidae
- Subfamily: Polyommatinae
- Tribe: Polyommatini
- Genus: Megisba; Moore, [1881]

Synonyms
- Pathalia Moore, 1884

= Megisba =

Butterfly genus in family Lycaenidae

Megisba is a genus of butterflies in the family Lycaenidae.

== Species ==
- Megisba malaya (Horsfield, [1828]) - Indomalayan realm
- Megisba strongyle (Felder, 1860) - Australasian realm
