= Qaradağlı, Agdash =

Qaradağlı
- Municipality
- Location within Azerbaijan
- Coordinates: 40°37′50″N 47°26′34″E
- Country: Azerbaijan
- Rayon: Agdash

Population
  - Total: 1,259
- Time zone: UTC+4 (AZT)
  - Summer (DST): UTC+5 (AZT)

Qaradağlı (also, Karadagly) is a village and municipality in the Agdash Rayon of Azerbaijan. It has a population of 1,259. The municipality consists of the villages of Qaradağlı and Malay.
