= USS Eastern Queen =

Japanese-built cargo steamship

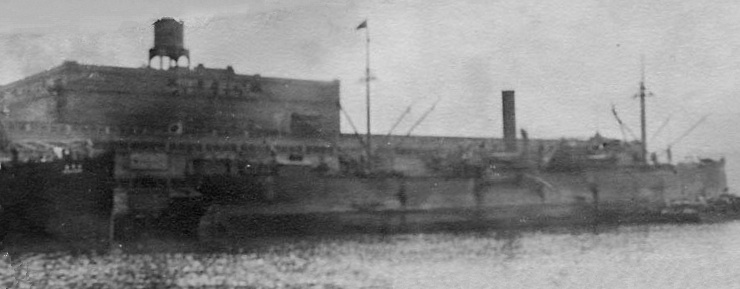
- Eastern Queen in port, probably in 1918

History

United States
- Name: 1918: Tofuku Maru; 1918: Eastern Queen
- Owner: 1918: US Shipping Board; 1935: USSB Bureau; 1937: US Maritime Commission; 1950: US Dept of Commerce
- Operator: 1918–19: United States Navy
- Port of registry: Seattle
- Builder: Kawasaki Dockyard, Kobe
- Completed: February 1918
- Acquired: by US Navy, 19 October 1918
- Commissioned: into US Navy, 26 October 1918
- Decommissioned: from US Navy, 19 April 1919
- Identification: US official number 216706; 1918–19: ID number ID–3406; 1918–33: code letters LMJF
- Fate: probably scrapped

General characteristics
- Type: cargo ship
- Tonnage: 5,797 GRT, 4,474 NRT
- Displacement: 12,105 tons
- Length: 397.0 ft (121.0 m) overall; 385.0 ft (117.3 m) registered
- Beam: 51.0 ft (15.5 m)
- Draught: 27 ft 1 in (8.3 m)
- Depth: 36.0 ft (11.0 m)
- Decks: 2
- Installed power: 444 NHP, 3,000 ihp
- Propulsion: 1 × triple-expansion engine; 1 × screw
- Speed: 10 1/2 knots (19 km/h)
- Complement: 70

USS Eastern Queen (ID–3406) was a cargo steamship. She was built in Japan in 1918 as Tofuku Maru, and bought that year by the United States Shipping Board (USSB), who renamed her Eastern Queen. From October 1918 to April 1919 she spent six months in the United States Navy as USS Eastern Queen, carrying cargo between the East Coast of the United States and France.

After her months in the Navy Eastern Queen reverted to the USSB. She passed to the United States Maritime Commission in 1936, and the United States Department of Commerce in 1950. She was still registered as a merchant ship in 1952.

== Building ==
In 1918 Kawasaki Dockyard in Kobe completed four identical sister ships: Tofuku Maru in February, Seifuku Maru in March, Taifuku Maru No. 20 in May, and Taifuku Maru No. 21 in June. The USSB bought them and renamed them Eastern Queen, Easterner, Eastern Sun, and Eastern Sea respectively. The Board bought further sister ships from Kawasaki, which were completed between September 1918 and March 1920. They were East Cape, East Wind, Easterling, Eastern Cloud, Eastern Dawn, Eastern Moon, Eastern Ocean, and Eastern Planet.

Eastern Queen's length was 397.0 ft (121.0 m) overall and 385.0 ft (117.3 m) registered. Her beam was 51.0 ft (15.5 m), her depth was 36.0 ft (11.0 m) and her draft was 27 ft 1 in (8.3 m). Her tonnages were 5,797 GRT, 4,474 NRT, and 12,105 tons displacement. She had a single screw, driven by a Kawasaki three-cylinder triple-expansion steam engine. It was rated at 444 NHP or 3,000 ihp, and gave her a speed of 10 1/2 knots (19 km/h).

The USSB registered Eastern Queen in Seattle. Her US official number was 216706 and her code letters were LMJF.

== US Navy ==
On 22 July 1918 the US Navy's 13th Naval District inspected Eastern Queen for possible naval service. The Baltimore Dry Dock & Shipbuilding Company converted her for naval use, and fitted her out to transport animals. On 19 October she was transferred from the USSB to the US Navy, and on 26 October she was commissioned as USS Eastern Queen, with the Naval Registry Identification Number ID–3406.

On 25 November, a fortnight after the Armistice of 11 November 1918, Eastern Queen left Norfolk, Virginia carrying general cargo and 550 horses. She reached Saint-Nazaire, France, on 14 December. She discharged her cargo, was ballasted with steel, and a fortnight later left carrying 30 United States Army passengers. On 15 January 1919 she reached Baltimore.

On 2 February Eastern Queen left for France carrying food, motor oil, and other cargo. She called at La Pallice and Bordeaux, and got back to the USA on 10 April. On 19 April she was decommissioned and returned to the USSB.

== Merchant ship ==
In the early 1930s all ships with wireless telegraphy were given new four-letter call signs superseded the old three-letter ones, and by 1934 these had superseded their code letters. No four-letter call sign was registered for Eastern Queen, so she may have been laid up.

In June 1936 the US Maritime Commission was founded to succeed the USSB, and became Eastern Queen's owner. The Maritime Commission ordered new ships to replace its First World War ones. In 1937 it sold some ships as surplus, including Easterling, Eastern Planet, and Easterner.

Other ships, including Eastern Queen, remained in the Government fleet. In May 1950 the Maritime Commission was abolished, and ownership of its remaining ships passed to the United States Department of Commerce. In 1952 Eastern Queen was still registered in the fleet of the Department of Commerce, and still with no call sign for its wireless telegraph.

== Bibliography ==
- Lloyd's Register of Shipping. Vol. II.–Steamers. London: Lloyd's Register of Shipping. 1919 – via Internet Archive.
- Lloyd's Register of Shipping (PDF). Vol. II.–Steamers and Motorships of 300 tons gross and over. London: Lloyd's Register of Shipping. 1934 – via Southampton City Council.
- Lloyd's Register of Shipping (PDF). Vol. II.–Steamers and Motorships over 300 tons. London: Lloyd's Register of Shipping. 1935 – via Southampton City Council.
- Lloyd's Register of Shipping (PDF). Vol. II.–Steamers and Motorships of 300 tons gross and over. London: Lloyd's Register of Shipping. 1937 – via Southampton City Council.
- Lloyd's Register of Shipping (PDF). Vol. II.–Steamers and Motorships of 300 tons gross and over. London: Lloyd's Register of Shipping. 1938 – via Southampton City Council.
- Register Book. Vol. I A–L. London: Lloyd's Register of Shipping. 1952 – via Internet Archive.
