= Siti Wuryan Prayitno =

Indonesian dentist and professor of periodontology

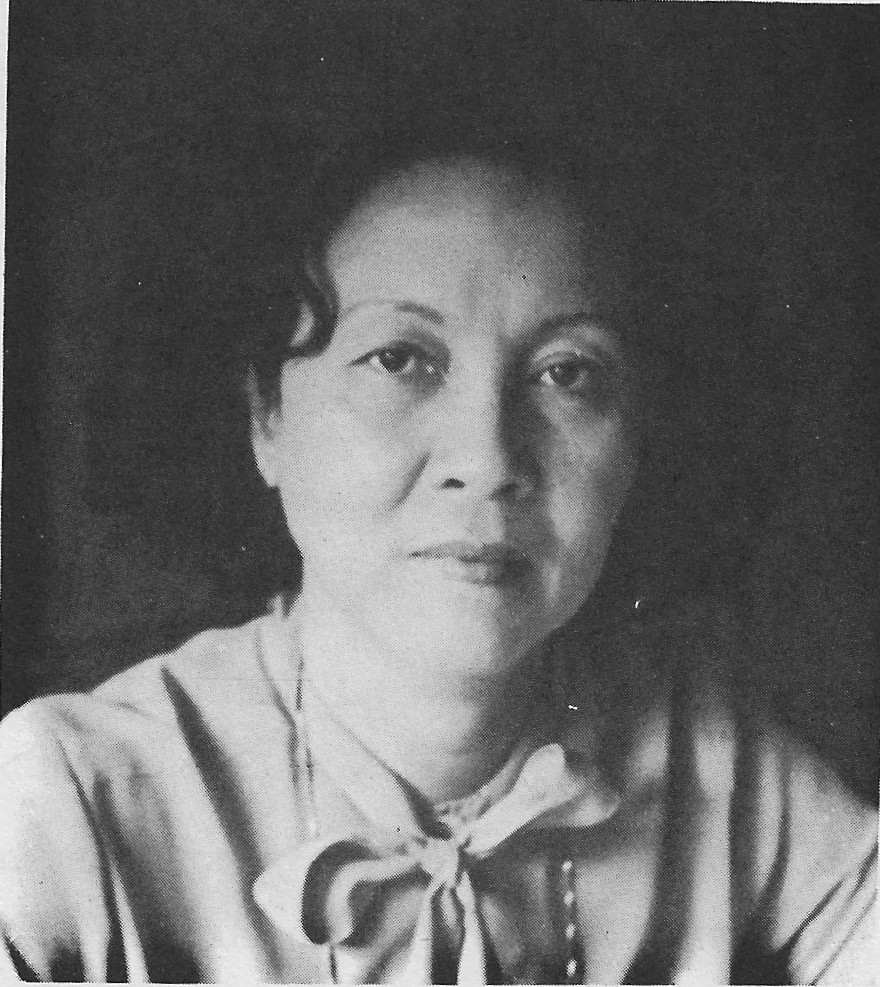

Dean of the Faculty of Dentistry of the University of Indonesia
- In office 17 February 1981 – 27 April 1987
- Preceded by: Ali Dahlan Nasution
- Succeeded by: Herwati Djoharnas
- In office 6 April 1972 – 2 April 1976
- Preceded by: Gusti Rizali Noor
- Succeeded by: Ali Dahlan Nasution

Personal details
- Born: September 4, 1933 Magetan, East Java, Dutch East Indies
- Died: June 30, 2020 (aged 86)
- Spouse: Arrohman Prayitno
- Children: 4
- Parents: Soepardan Wirodirdjo (father); Siti Soeminah (mother)
- Education: Airlangga University (drg); University of Indonesia (SKM, Prof); University of Wales College of Medicine (MScD, PhD)

Academic background
- Thesis: A comparison of the periodontal health of two groups of young adult Indonesians and characterization of advanced periodontal disease (1990)
- Doctoral advisor: Martin Addy; William Wade

Academic work
- Discipline: Dentistry
- Sub-discipline: Periodontology

Siti Wuryan Arrohman Prayitno (4 September 1933 – 30 June 2020) was an Indonesian dentist and professor of periodontology at the University of Indonesia. She was the University of Indonesia's dentistry faculty's dean from 1972 to 1976 and from 1981 to 1987.

== Early life and education ==
Siti was born on 4 September 1933 in Magetan, East Java, (Note: Kompas, 20 April 1972 stated that Siti was born in 1939. This would not make sense, as this meant that Siti completed her elementary school at the age of six years old and high school at the age of 14. This also meant that the claim Kompas made in their article (Siti was the youngest dean of UI at the age of 33 years old) was invalid.) as the twelfth children of Soepardan Wirodirdjo and Siti Soeminah. Her father was a district chieftain (wedana) under the Dutch East Indies colonial government and was able to provide adequate education to all of his children. Siti completed her elementary school at a people's school in Lamongan in 1945 and continued her education at a junior high school there. Due to the ongoing Indonesian National Revolution, she had to move to Madiun and continue her junior high school studies there, which she completed in 1950. She studied for two years at a Perjuangan (pro-Republican) high school from 1951 to 1952, before completing her high school education at the 1st Surabaya State High School in 1953.

Upon receiving her high school diploma, Siti initially wanted to study engineering at the Bandung Institute of Technology. However, her parents disallowed her to study there, and she decided to study dentistry at the University of Indonesia in Surabaya. Several months after her entry, the university was established as the separate Airlangga University. As a student, Siti joined the faculty's student senate and student council, and became a board member of the councils. Siti choose periodontology as her specialty, which was unpopular among Indonesian dentists at that time. She graduated as a dentist in 1960 and began teaching as an assistant professor.

Between her first term and second term as dean, Siti pursued education in public health at the University of Indonesia. She earned a bachelor's degree in public health in 1977 with a thesis on dental services adaptation to the general public. A year later, in 1978, she earned her master's degree in dental sciences (Magister in Scientia Dentali) from the University of Wales College of Medicine with a thesis on the oral use of chlorhexidine gluconate. Siti pursued her doctoral studies at the same college after the end of her second term as dean. Her dissertation, titled A comparison of the periodontal health of two groups of young adult Indonesians and characterization of advanced periodontal disease, was presented on 26 November 1990 with Martin Addy and William Wade as her advisors.

== Career ==
Four years into her tenure as an assistant professor at the Airlangga University, Siti was promoted to the academic rank of junior lecturer. On the same year, she decided to move to the dentistry faculty of the University of Indonesia. She, along with Professor Prijantojo, established the periodontology department in the faculty. She became the chief of education administration of the dentistry faculty from 1965 to 1967, and from 1967 to 1972 she was the head of the periodontology department.

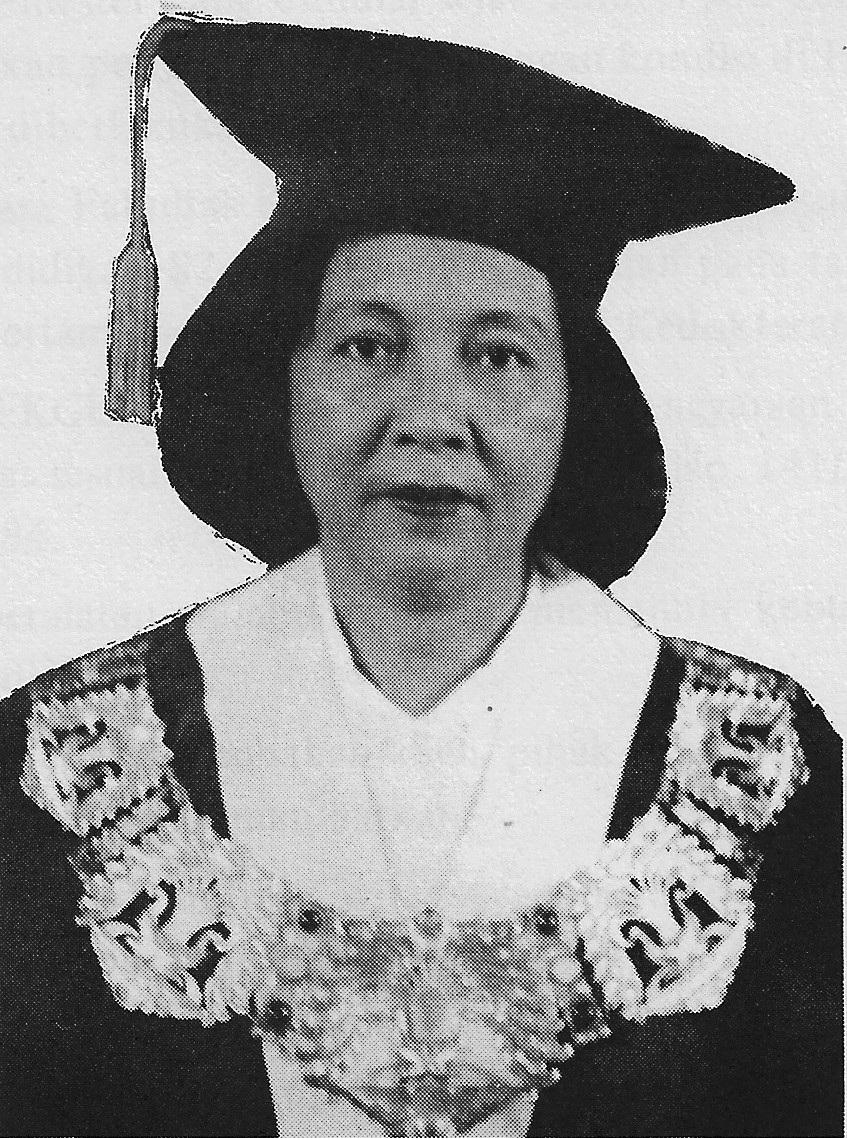
Siti in her academic robe as the dean of the dentistry faculty.

On 6 April 1972, Siti was appointed as the dean of the dentistry faculty. She was the first woman to be appointed as dean in the university. Siti began her tenure with a lack of proper facilities and permanent lecturers. Several days after her appointment, Siti stated that she would abolish dual positions in the faculty in order to improve human resources efficiency. She conducted a two-month visit to Japan and Malaysia for a comparative study with dentistry faculties in the countries. She served for two two-year terms until she was replaced by Ali Dahlan Nasution on 2 April 1976.

After receiving her master's degree, Siti began her second term as dean on 17 February 1981, serving until 27 April 1987 and was replaced by Herwati Djoharnas. During her second term, she oversaw the establishment of the postgraduate specialist program in clinical dentistry in 1982. She was promoted to the academic rank of full professor in 1992. In her inaugural speech as a full professor on 13 February 1993, Siti advocated for the development of periodontology to support national development.

Aside from her academic positions, Siti was involved in organizations related to dentistry. She was a member of Indonesia's medicine consortium team on dentistry from 1979 to 1988 and a member of the FDI World Dental Federation since 1978, the British Society of Periodontology since 1990, and the International Academy of Periodontology in 1992. In national organizations, she was the chairwoman of the Union of Indonesian Periodontologists from 1979 to 1981 and the secretary general of the Union of Indonesian Dentists from 1975 to 1982 (she was first secretary from 1978 to 1980). From 1983 to 1992, she was an advisor and a member of the honorary board of the Union of Indonesian Dentists.

== Personal life ==
Siti was married to First Admiral Arrohman Prayitno, a psychiatrist at the Indonesian Navy. The couple had three sons and a daughter.

Siti died on 30 June 2020.
