= SS Mari Chandris =

Greek-owned cargo ship sunk in 1940

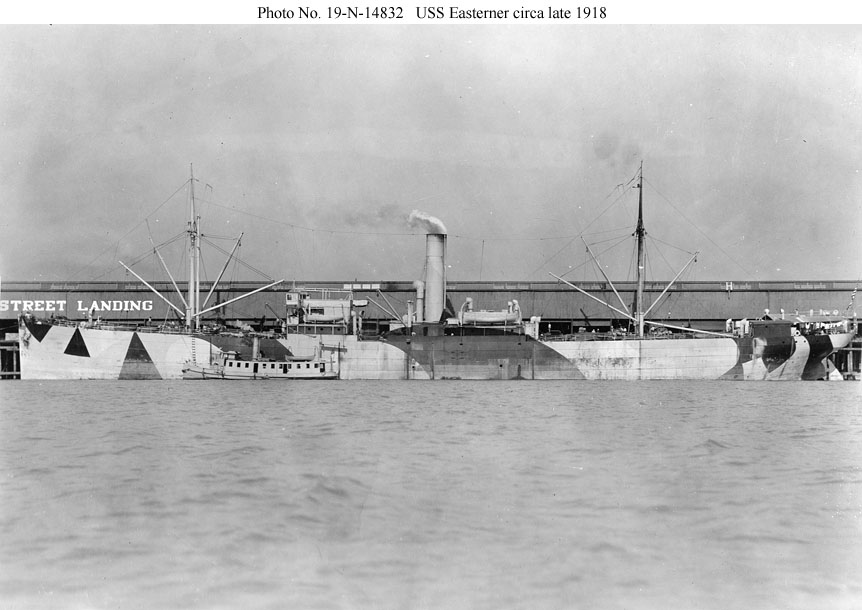
- The ship as Easterner, in First World War camouflage

History
- Name: 1918: Seifuku Maru No. 20; 1918: Easterner; 1937: Mari Chandris
- Owner: 1918: US Shipping Board; 1935: USSB Bureau; 1937: US Maritime Commission; 1937: John D. Chandris
- Operator: 1918–19: US Navy
- Port of registry: 1918: (United States) San Francisco; 1937: (Greece) Piraeus
- Builder: Kawasaki Dockyard, Kobe
- Completed: March 1918
- Acquired: by US Navy, 12 Nov 1918
- Commissioned: into US Navy, 12 Nov 1918
- Decommissioned: from US Navy, 14 May 1919
- Identification: US official number 216793; 1918: code letters LMPQ; 1918–19: ID number ID–3331; by 1934: call sign KJIT; 1937: call sign SVYE
- Fate: sunk by aircraft, 1940

General characteristics
- Type: cargo steamship
- Tonnage: 5,806 GRT, 4,558 NRT
- Displacement: 12,105 tons
- Length: 385.0 ft (117.3 m)
- Beam: 51.0 ft (15.5 m)
- Draft: 27 ft 1 in (8.3 m)
- Depth: 36.0 ft (11.0 m)
- Decks: 2
- Installed power: 1 × triple-expansion engine, 3,000 ihp, 444 NHP
- Propulsion: 1 × screw
- Speed: 10 1/2 knots (19 km/h)
- Complement: in US Navy: 70
- Crew: in merchant service: 37
- Sensors & processing systems: submarine signalling

SS Mari Chandris was a cargo steamship. She was built in Japan in 1918 as Seifuku Maru No. 20, and bought that year by the United States Shipping Board (USSB), who renamed her Easterner. From November 1918 to May 1919, she spent six months in the United States Navy as USS Easterner (ID–3331), carrying cargo between the East Coast of the United States and France.

The Greek shipowner John D. Chandris bought Easterner in 1937, and renamed her Mari Chandris A few months later she was attached to a lawsuit arising from the sinking of her sister ship Tzenny Chandris.

In June 1940, while sailing in a convoy, Mari Chandris was damaged in a collision. In July 1940 she was set on fire in a German air raid and sunk. All of her crew survived.

== Building ==
In 1918 Kawasaki Dockyard in Kobe completed four identical sister ships: Tofuku Maru in February, Seifuku Maru No. 20 in March, Taifuku Maru No. 20 in May, and Taifuku Maru No. 21 in June. The USSB bought them and renamed them Eastern Queen, Easterner, Eastern Sun, and Eastern Sea respectively. The Board bought further sister ships from Kawasaki, which were completed between September 1918 and March 1920. They were East Cape, East Wind, Easterling, Eastern Cloud, Eastern Dawn, Eastern Moon, Eastern Ocean, and Eastern Planet.

Easterner's registered length was 385.0 ft (117.3 m). Her beam was 51.0 ft (15.5 m), her depth was 36.0 ft (11.0 m) and her draft was 27 ft 1 in (8.3 m). Her tonnages were 5,806 GRT, 4,558 NRT, and 12,105 tons displacement. She had a single screw, driven by a Kawasaki three-cylinder triple-expansion steam engine. It was rated at 444 NHP, or 3,000 ihp, and gave her a speed of 10 1/2 knots (19 km/h).

The USSB registered Easterner in San Francisco. Her US official number was 216793, and her code letters were LMPQ.

== US Navy ==
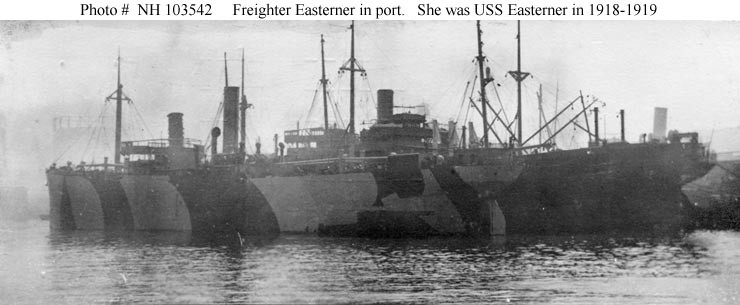
Easterner alongside other ships in First World War camouflage

On 29 August 1918, the 12th Naval District inspected Easterner. On 12 November she was transferred from the USSB to the US Navy, and commissioned that same day as USS Easterner, with the Naval Registry Identification Number ID–3331.

Easterner was assigned to the Naval Overseas Transportation Service. Between 1 December 1918 and 8 May 1919, she made two round trip voyages between Norfolk, Virginia and French ports. She carried general cargo for the United States Army, including railroad cars and engineering supplies. On her second voyage she called at Bordeaux. Two days after leaving Bordeaux, the crew discovered two stowaways: a man and a child. They were surrendered to the Bureau of Immigration when Easterner reached Norfolk.

On 14 May 1919, the Navy decommissioned Easterner, and returned her to the USSB.

== Ownership ==
In June 1936, the US Maritime Commission was founded to succeed the USSB, and became Easterner's owner. The Maritime Commission ordered new ships to replace its First World War ones, and sold some ships as surplus. In 1937 John Chandris bought Easterling, Eastern Planet, and Easterner, and renamed them Antonios Chandris, Tzenny Chandris and Mari Chandris respectively. He registered Mari Chandris in Piraeus. Her call sign was SVYE.

On 13 November 1937, Tzenny Chandris foundered in the Graveyard of the Atlantic, killing several of her crew. On 3 December one of the survivors, Third Engineer Kostas Palaskas, sued John Chandris for $7,300 damages. Mari Chandris was in port at Newport News, Virginia at the time, and the Norfolk Division of the Federal District Court attached her to the lawsuit. On 18 December John Chandris pled, inter alia, that he had sold Mari Chandris and another of his ships to a George Georgantis, a fellow Greek. Chandris claimed the sale was completed four hours before Palaskas filed his suit, and therefore the Court could not attach the ships to the case.

== Loss ==
In 1940, Mari Chandris, with a cargo of raw cotton, sailed in Convoy HG 33, which left Gibraltar on 8 June bound for Liverpool. Mari Chandris was damaged in a collision, so she was towed to an anchorage in Falmouth, Cornwall. In July she was still in Falmouth, and a tanker, Tascalusa, was anchored near her.

On 10 July German aircraft bombed Tascalusa, setting her on fire. The fire spread to Mari Chandris and her cargo of cotton. All of her 37 crew survived, but Mari Chandris was towed to a bay near St Mawes and sunk by gunfire. Later she was raised, and beached at Place. Some of her cargo was salvaged, and she was broken up in situ.

== Bibliography ==
- Bureau of Navigation (1919). Fifty-First Annual List of Merchant Vessels of the United States (PDF). Washington, DC: United States Department of Commerce and Labor – via HyperWar.
- Jordan, Roger (1999). The World's Merchant Fleets, 1939. London: Chatham publishing. ISBN 1-86176-023-X.
- Lloyd's Register of Shipping. Vol. II.–Steamers. London: Lloyd's Register of Shipping. 1919 – via Internet Archive.
- Lloyd's Register of Shipping (PDF). Vol. II.–Steamers and Motorships of 300 tons gross and over. London: Lloyd's Register of Shipping. 1934 – via Southampton City Council.
- Lloyd's Register of Shipping (PDF). Vol. II.–Steamers and Motorships over 300 tons. London: Lloyd's Register of Shipping. 1935 – via Southampton City Council.
- Lloyd's Register of Shipping (PDF). Vol. II.–Steamers and Motorships of 300 tons gross and over. London: Lloyd's Register of Shipping. 1937 – via Southampton City Council.
- Lloyd's Register of Shipping (PDF). Vol. II.–Steamers and Motorships of 300 tons gross and over. London: Lloyd's Register of Shipping. 1938 – via Southampton City Council.
- Pollard, Chris (2007). The Book of St Mawes. Wellington: Halsgrove. ISBN 978-1-84114-631-7.
