= SS Tzenny Chandris =

Greek-owned cargo ship that sank in 1937

History
- Name: 1920: Eastern Planet; 1937: Tzenny Chandris
- Owner: 1920: U.S. Shipping Board; 1935: USSB Bureau; 1937: U.S. Maritime Commission; 1937: John D. Chandris
- Port of registry: 1920: (United States) Seattle; 1937: (Greece) Piraeus
- Builder: Kawasaki Dockyard, Kobe
- Completed: February 1920
- Identification: U.S. official number 219889; 1920: code letters LWHF; by 1934: call sign KJIR
- Fate: sank 13 November 1937

General characteristics
- Type: cargo ship
- Tonnage: 5,816 GRT, 3,604 NRT
- Length: 384.8 ft (117.3 m)
- Beam: 51.0 ft (15.5 m)
- Depth: 36.0 ft (11.0 m)
- Decks: 2
- Installed power: 437 NHP
- Propulsion: 1 × triple-expansion engine; 1 × screw
- Speed: 10 1/2 knots (19 km/h)
- Crew: 29
- Sensors & processing systems: submarine signalling

SS Tzenny Chandris (or Jenny Chandris) was a cargo steamship. She was built in Japan in 1920 as Eastern Planet, and renamed Tzenny Chandris when she changed owners in 1937.

Eastern Planet was one of numerous cargo ships that Japanese shipyards built for the United States Shipping Board around the end of the First World War. By 1937 she was one of many ships laid up in the James River. A syndicate led by the Greek shipowner John D. Chandris bought her, had her reconditioned, and renamed her. The supplement to the 1937 edition of Lloyd's Register of Shipping spells her name Jenny Chandris, but 1937 news sources all record it as Tzenny Chandris.

In November 1937 Tzenny Chandris left North Carolina with a cargo for the Netherlands. A storm sank her in the Graveyard of the Atlantic, killing seven or eight of her crew. The United States Coast Guard cutter Mendota, guided by United States Navy and U.S. Coast Guard aircraft, rescued 21 survivors.

== Building ==
From 1918 to 1920 Japanese shipyards built numerous cargo ships for the United States Shipping Board (USSB). The USSB gave them names beginning with East or Eastern. They included a dozen steamships that the Kawasaki Dockyard in Kobe built, all to a standard design with identical dimensions. They were East Cape, East Wind, Easterling, Eastern Cloud, Eastern Dawn, Eastern Moon, Eastern Ocean, Eastern Planet, Eastern Queen, Eastern Sea, Eastern Sun, and Easterner.

Eastern Planet was completed in 1920. Her registered length was 384.8 ft (117.3 m), her beam was 51.0 ft (15.5 m), and her depth was 36.0 ft (11.0 m). Her tonnages were 5,816 GRT and 3,604 NRT. She had a single screw, driven by a Kawasaki three-cylinder triple-expansion steam engine. It was rated at 437 NHP, and gave her a speed of 10 1/2 knots (19 km/h).

== Ownership and registration ==
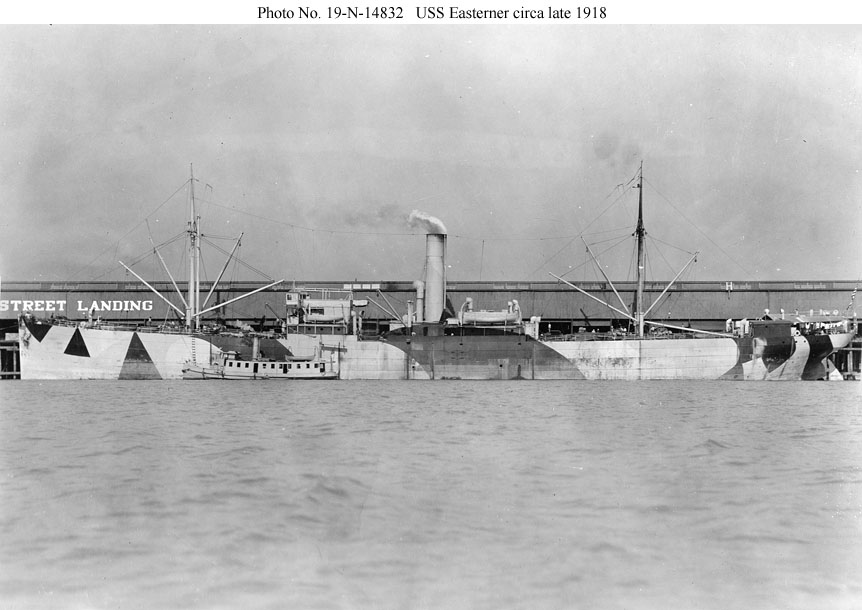
Easterner, one of Eastern Planet's sister ships, in First World War camouflage in 1918. John Chandris bought her in 1937 and renamed her Mari Chandris.

The USSB registered Eastern Planet in Seattle. Her U.S. official number was 219889 and her code letters were LWHF. By 1934 her call sign was KJIR. In June 1936 the United States Maritime Commission was founded to succeed the USSB, and became Eastern Planet's owner.

The Maritime Commission ordered new ships to replace First World War ones now almost two decades old, and sought buyers for ships that were now surplus to U.S. Government requirements. By 1937 Eastern Planet was one of a fleet of surplus ships laid up in the James River.

In the summer of 1937 a syndicate headed by John Chandris bought Easterling, Eastern Planet, and Easterner from the Maritime Commission in Baltimore. Chandris paid $64,000 for Eastern Planet. He renamed them Antonios Chandris, Tzenny Chandris and Mari Chandris respectively. (The supplement of the 1937 Lloyd's Register of Shipping uses the spelling Jenny Chandris.) John Chandris had Tzenny Chandris reconditioned in a shipyard in Norfolk, and registered her in Piraeus.

== Loss ==
In November 1937 Tzenny Chandris left Morehead City, North Carolina for Rotterdam carrying a cargo of scrap iron and cattle. Survivors alleged that the ship scraped the harbor bottom before she left Morehead City, and was leaking soon after she left port. They claimed that they implored the Master, Captain George Coufopandelis, to turn her back, but he said that her pumps would cope with the water. The also that she started to list to starboard before she encountered the storm.

Three days after leaving Morehead, on the night of 12–13 November, she encountered a gale off the Diamond Shoals. At 04:15 hrs on 13 November her wireless telegraph operator sent an SOS message. Radiomarine Corporation of America (RMCA) in New York received the signal, but could not verify Tzenny Chandris's position. RMCA's station in Savannah, Georgia alerted all ships to stand by to assist. Tzenny Chandris continued to send SOS signals for about an hour, and then ceased.

The scrap iron in Tzenny Chandris' cargo had shifted, causing her to list about 15 degrees. Captain Coufopandelis gave the order to abandon ship. Survivors reported that the storm tore off one of the ship's ventilators, and that this allowed water washing over her deck to enter one of her bunkers. From there it flooded the stoke hold and engine room, extinguished her furnaces, and shut down her electric lighting. She rolled on her side, and then sank about ten minutes after she was abandoned. Her position was about 30 to 40 nautical miles (56 to 74 km) northwest of Diamond Shoals.

== Rescue ==
The CD Mallory tanker Swiftsure, en route from Corpus Christi to Boston, was first to arrive, and just after 0930 hours, rescued six survivors from a lifeboat. The survivors and tanker crew did not speak each other's languages, but the survivors were able to tell Swiftsure's crew that another 14 of Tzenny Chandris' crew had abandoned ship in another lifeboat.

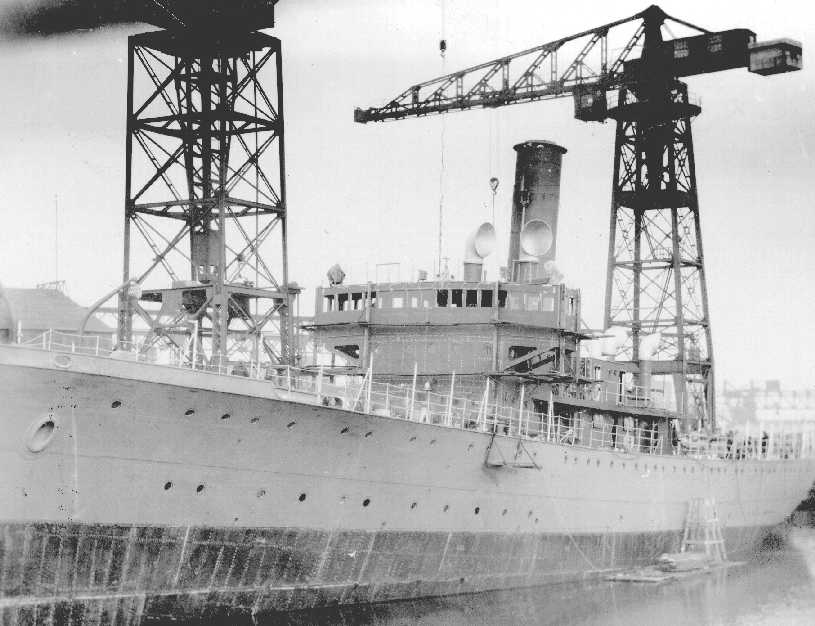
USCGC Mendota

Rain squalls reduced visibility. Swiftsure searched until about 11:00 hrs without finding further survivors. Then the United States Coast Guard cutters Bibb, Mendota, and Sebago continued the search, aided by four United States Navy patrol aircraft, as Swiftsure resumed her voyage to Boston. The cutters Dione and Modoc also joined the search, and a total of eight Navy and Coast Guard aircraft took part. At 08:30 hrs on 14 November a Navy aeroplane found an empty lifeboat and directed Mendota to it. Bibb found another lifeboat. The cutters reached a total of three lifeboats, two of which had turned turtle. No survivors were found with any of the boats.

At about 10:30 hrs the same aeroplane found floating wreckage. 13 men were clinging to wreckage including a derrick boom that had floated free from the ship. They were trying to fend off sharks, so the aeroplane dived several times to drive the predators away. The aeroplane then fetched Mendota, which arrived at 12:30 hrs. The cutter rescued 13 men from the water and recovered the body of one dead man. A U.S. Coast Guard aircraft found a lifeboat about 90 nautical miles (170 km) off Kitty Hawk, North Carolina. It directed Mendota to the boat, from which the cutter rescued two survivors and recovered the bodies of three dead men. One of the survivors told his rescuers that another crewman had died in the boat shortly after the sinking on 13 November, so they had thrown his body overboard. Mendota landed the 15 survivors at Norfolk, where they were all admitted to the Marine Hospital.

Most of the crew were Greek. One was English, Joseph Corrie. He said he was the last to leave the ship, and last to be rescued. He could not swim, so he clung to a piece of wood, which he used also to try to beat off sharks.

== Aftermath ==
On 15 November one of the survivors, Third Engineer Kostas Palaskas, alleged that the wireless operator delayed transmitting the first SOS message for five hours because he was awaiting an order from Captain Coufopandelis. Palaskas alleged that he had to threaten the operator with a knife before he agreed to transmit the signal. However, when the Norfolk City Coroner convened an inquest in the hospital on 16 November for the four men whose bodies Mendota had landed in Norfolk, Palaskas withdrew his allegation, and denied that the ship had been unseaworthy. The four bodies were buried in Norfolk on 17 November.

However, on 3 December 1937 Palaskas sued John Chandris for $7,300 in the Norfolk Division of the Federal District Court. Tzenny Chandris's sister ship Mari Chandris, which was in port at Newport News, Virginia, was attached to the lawsuit. On 9 December four other survivors filed claims for injury, hospitalisation, loss of personal effects, and unpaid wages. Their claims totalled $39,670, and were filed as interventions on Palaskas' lawsuit. Deputy marshals attached another of John Chandris' ships, Rockport which the Norfolk Shipbuilding & Drydock Co was overhauling, for the four new claims.

On 18 December, John Chandris pled before Judge Luther B. Way that a U.S. court had no jurisdiction over claims between Greek citizens over an event that took place outside U.S. territorial waters. Secondly, under a 1903 treaty between Greece and the U.S., Greek consular officers have exclusive jurisdiction over claims by Greek seafarers against Greek ships or owners in the U.S.. And thirdly, he claimed that he no longer owned Mari Chandris or Rockport, as he sold both ships to a fellow Greek four hours before Palaskas filed his claim.

== Bibliography ==
- Lloyd's Register of Shipping. Vol. II.–Steamers. London: Lloyd's Register of Shipping. 1921 – via Internet Archive.
- Lloyd's Register of Shipping (PDF). Vol. II.–Steamers and Motorships of 300 tons gross and over. London: Lloyd's Register of Shipping. 1934 – via Southampton City Council.
- Lloyd's Register of Shipping (PDF). Vol. II.–Steamers and Motorships over 300 tons. London: Lloyd's Register of Shipping. 1935 – via Southampton City Council.
- Lloyd's Register of Shipping (PDF). Vol. II.–Steamers and Motorships of 300 tons gross and over. London: Lloyd's Register of Shipping. 1937 – via Southampton City Council.
- Lloyd's Register of Shipping (PDF). Vol. II.–Steamers and Motorships of 300 tons gross and over. London: Lloyd's Register of Shipping. 1938 – via Southampton City Council.
