= SS Antonios Chandris =

Greek-owned cargo ship sunk in 1940

History
- Name: 1918: Easterling; 1937: Antonios Chandris
- Owner: 1918: US Shipping Board; 1935: USSB Bureau; 1937: US Maritime Commission; 1937: John D. Chandris
- Port of registry: 1918: (United States) Seattle; 1937: (Greece) Piraeus
- Builder: Kawasaki Dockyard, Kobe
- Completed: October 1918
- Identification: US official number 217478; 1918: code letters LPNM; by 1934: call sign KJIK; 1937: call sign SVYD
- Fate: scuttled, 1940

General characteristics
- Type: cargo ship
- Tonnage: 5,842 GRT, 4,489 NRT
- Length: 385.0 ft (117.3 m)
- Beam: 51.0 ft (15.5 m)
- Draft: 27 ft 1 in (8.3 m)
- Depth: 36.0 ft (11.0 m)
- Decks: 2
- Installed power: 440 NHP
- Propulsion: 1 × triple-expansion engine; 1 × screw
- Speed: 10 1/2 knots (19 km/h)
- Sensors & processing systems: submarine signalling

SS Antonios Chandris was a cargo steamship. She was built in Japan in 1918 as Easterling, and renamed Antonios Chandris when she changed owners in 1937. A German merchant raider sank her in the Atlantic Ocean in 1940. 32 of her crew survived a month in two lifeboats before being rescued.

Easterling was one of numerous cargo ships that Japanese shipyards built for the United States Shipping Board around the end of the First World War. The Greek shipowner John D. Chandris bought her as global shipping revived in the late 1930s from the slump that followed the Wall Street crash of 1929.

In 1940 Antonios Chandris took part in North Atlantic convoys, bringing Canadian grain to the Republic of Ireland and United Kingdom. She was captured and scuttled when Greece was still neutral, before Italy and Germany invaded the country.

== Building ==
From 1918 to 1920 Japanese shipyards built numerous cargo ships for the United States Shipping Board (USSB). The USSB gave them names beginning with East or Eastern. They included a dozen steamships that the Kawasaki Dockyard in Kobe built, all to a standard design with identical dimensions. They were East Cape, East Wind, Easterling, Eastern Cloud, Eastern Dawn, Eastern Moon, Eastern Ocean, Eastern Planet, Eastern Queen, Eastern Sea, Eastern Sun, and Easterner.

Easterling was completed in October 1918, shortly before the Armistice of 11 November 1918. Her registered length was 385.0 ft (117.3 m), her beam was 51.0 ft (15.5 m), her depth was 36.0 ft (11.0 m) and her draft was 27 ft 1 in (8.3 m). Her tonnages were 5,842 GRT and 4,489 NRT. She had a single screw, driven by a Kawasaki three-cylinder triple-expansion steam engine. It was rated at 440 NHP, and gave her a speed of 10 1/2 knots (19 km/h).

== Ownership and registration ==
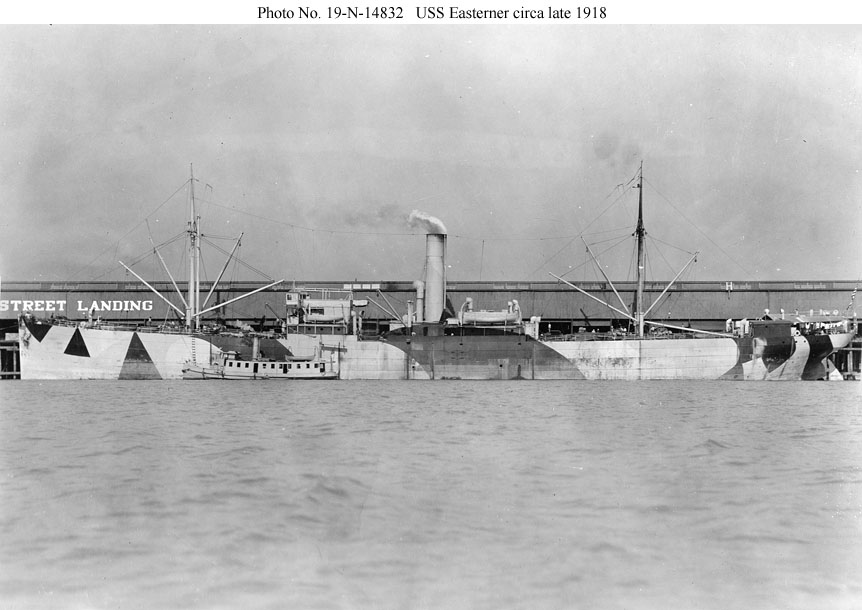
Easterner, one of Easterling's sister ships, in First World War camouflage in 1918. John D. Chandris bought her in 1937 and renamed her Mari Chandris.

The USSB registered Easterling in Seattle. Her US official number was 217478 and her code letters were LPNM. By 1934 her call sign was KJIK. In June 1936 the United States Maritime Commission was founded to succeed the USSB, and became Easterling's owner.

The Maritime Commission ordered new ships to replace First World War ones now almost two decades old, and sought buyers for ships that were now surplus to US Government requirements. In 1937 John Chandris bought Easterling, Eastern Planet, and Easterner, and renamed them Antonios Chandris, Tzenny Chandris and Mari Chandris respectively. He registered Antonios Chandris in Piraeus. Her call sign was SVYD.

== Second World War ==
In October 1939 Antonios Chandris was in the South Atlantic. She left Bahía Blanca in Argentina on 24 October and reached Montevideo in Uruguay two days later. She steamed via Cape Verde to England, reaching Weymouth Bay on 30 November. She then waited at The Downs and the Nieuwe Waterweg before joining Convoy OA 22, which assembled off Southend-on-Sea on 22 December 1939, and dispersed at sea on Christmas Day.

Antonios Chandris spent the first eight months of 1940 crossing the North Atlantic between the British Isles and Canada. She sailed west with OB convoys until they dispersed at sea. She returned eastbound on HX convoys HX 17, HX 32, HX 46 and HX 59, bringing grain, usually wheat, from Canadian ports such as Montreal to Dublin, the Clyde, or Avonmouth.

From 11 to 19 August 1940 Antonios Chandris was in Cardiff loading 7,500 tons of coal for Buenos Aires. On 22 August she left Milford Haven with Convoy OB 202, which dispersed at sea four days later.

== Loss and rescues ==
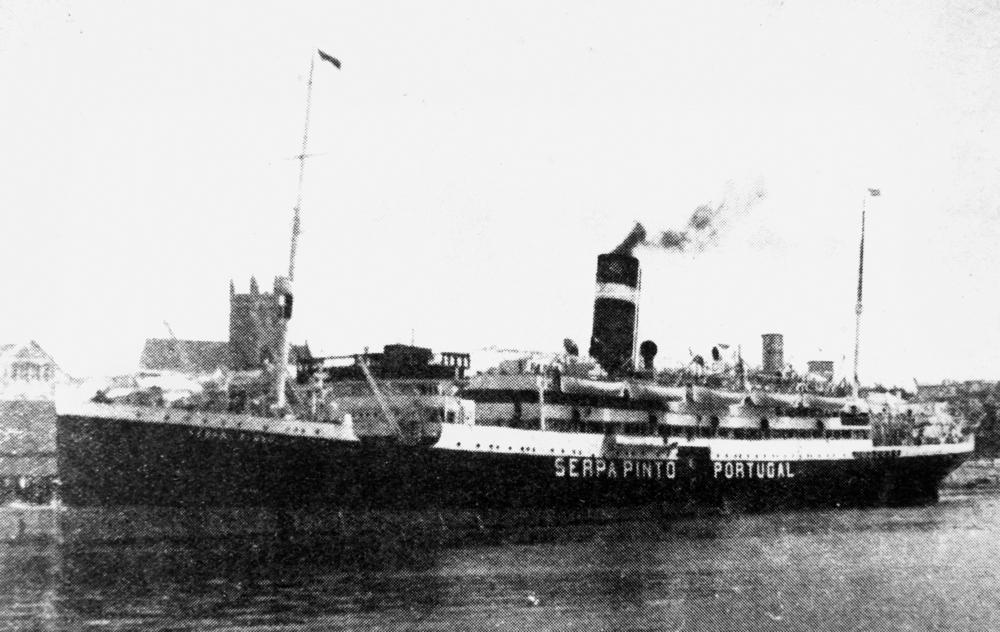
Serpa Pinto

On 8 September the German auxiliary cruiser Widder intercepted Antonios Chandris in the South Atlantic and ordered her to stop. The German commander, Hellmuth von Ruckteschell, ordered the crew to abandon ship. Widder was already crowded with 140 prisoners of war from other merchant ships, so Ruckteschell gave the Greek crew extra food and water, and left them at sea in Antonios Chandris' two lifeboats. A German boarding party scuttled Antonios Chandris with explosives at position 11°25′N 34°10′W.

The two lifeboats became separated. A month later, on 8 October, the 22 occupants of one boat sighted the Portuguese passenger ship Serpa Pinto and signalled to her with distress rockets. Serpa Pinto rescued the survivors and landed them at Rio de Janeiro. On 3 November they embarked on another CCN ship, Tagus, to return to Europe. A United Kingdom cargo ship found the other lifeboat, and on 21 October landed its ten surviving occupants at Buenos Aires.

== Bibliography ==
- Lloyd's Register of Shipping. Vol. II.–Steamers. London: Lloyd's Register of Shipping. 1919 – via Internet Archive.
- Lloyd's Register of Shipping (PDF). Vol. II.–Steamers and Motorships of 300 tons gross and over. London: Lloyd's Register of Shipping. 1934 – via Southampton City Council.
- Lloyd's Register of Shipping (PDF). Vol. II.–Steamers and Motorships over 300 tons. London: Lloyd's Register of Shipping. 1935 – via Southampton City Council.
- Lloyd's Register of Shipping (PDF). Vol. II.–Steamers and Motorships of 300 tons gross and over. London: Lloyd's Register of Shipping. 1937 – via Southampton City Council.
- Lloyd's Register of Shipping (PDF). Vol. II.–Steamers and Motorships of 300 tons gross and over. London: Lloyd's Register of Shipping. 1938 – via Southampton City Council.
