= Malay, Azerbaijan =

Malay
- Location within Azerbaijan
- Coordinates: 40°36′06″N 47°22′33″E
- Country: Azerbaijan
- Rayon: Agdash
- Municipality: Qaradağlı
- Time zone: UTC+4 (AZT)
  - Summer (DST): UTC+5 (AZT)

Malay is a village in the Agdash Rayon of Azerbaijan. The village forms part of the municipality of Qaradağlı.

== Geography ==
The village is located 12 km from the municipal center of Karadaghly, 13 km from the regional center of Agdash, and 247 km from Baku. The nearest railway station is Laki.

is located at an altitude of 21 meters above sea level.
