= Bünyamin =

Bünyamin is an older pronunciation and Turkish variant of Benjamin and may refer to:

- Bunyamin Abdusalam, Chinese footballer
- Bünyamin Sezer, Turkish weightlifter
- Bünyamin Sudaş, Turkish weightlifter
- Mohd Bunyamin Umar, Malaysian footballer
