= Javanese diaspora =

People of Javanese ethnicity residing outside Indonesia

ꦣꦶꦪꦱ꧀ꦥꦺꦴꦫꦗꦮ
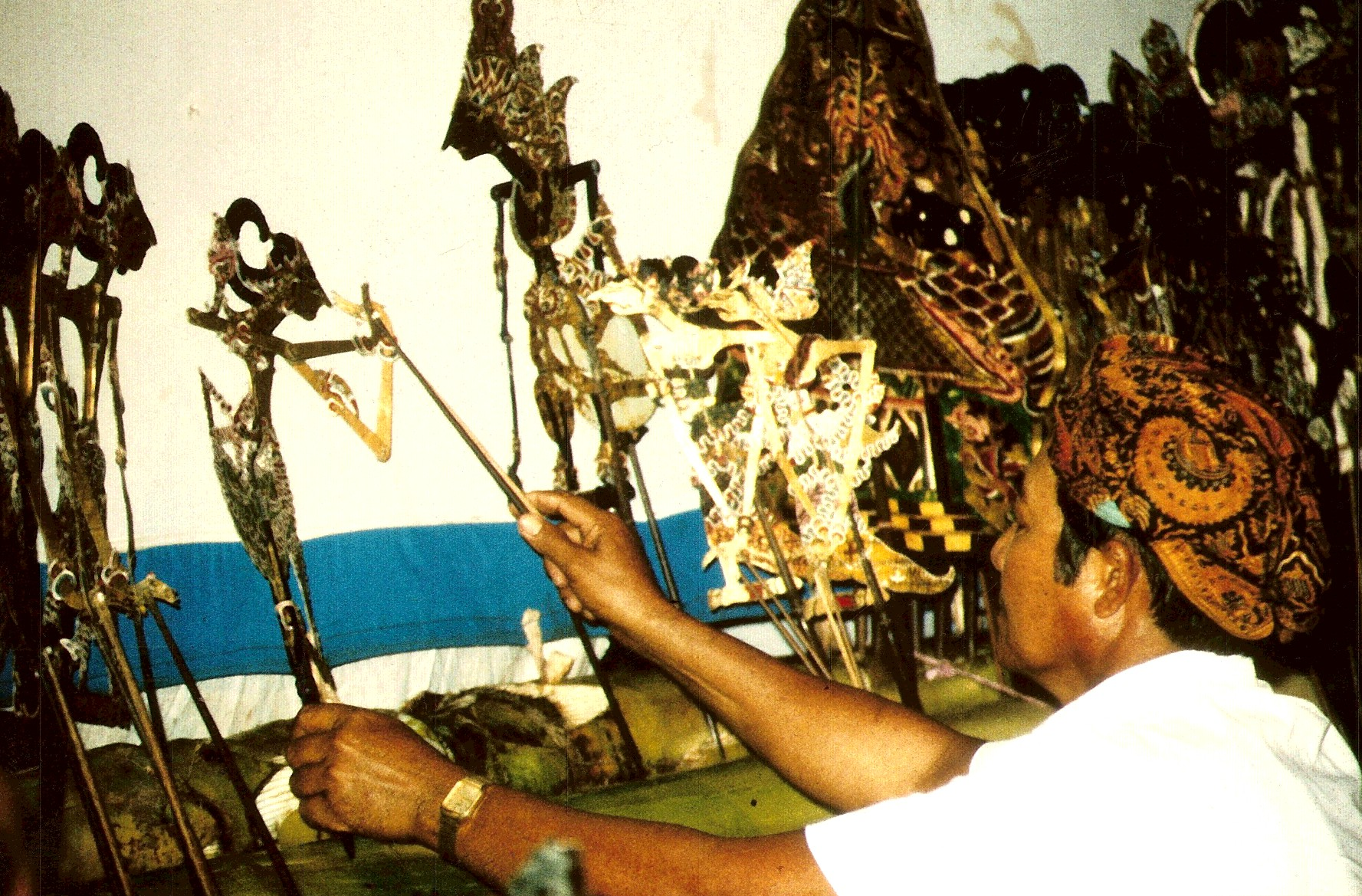
- A traditional wayang kulit performance by Javanese diaspora in Suriname

Total population
- c. 6–8 million

Regions with significant populations
- Malaysia: c. 1,500,000 (including Malaysian citizen; assimilate into the local Malaysian Malays) (Note: It is very difficult to find exact figures because the Malaysian census does not consider the Javanese as one ethnicity but part of the Malays, according to the 1950 Malaysian census it was estimated that more than 189,000 Malaysian Malays were born to Javanese parents. This figure is very significant considering the number of Malaysian Malays at that time was just under 3 million. Javanese descendants form large communities in Johor, Selangor, Terengganu and other states in Malaysia.)
- Singapore: c. 400,000 (including Singaporean citizens, more than 60% of Singaporean Malays are of Javanese descent)
- Taiwan: 190,000–240,000 (2018)
- Hong Kong: 151,021 (2016)
- Saudi Arabia: 150,000 (2014)
- United Arab Emirates: 114,000 (2014)
- Suriname: 102,000 (2019)
- Jordan: 48,000 (2014)
- Sri Lanka: 40,148 (2014)
- Oman: 33,000 (2014)
- Qatar: 28,000 (2014)
- Netherlands: 21,700 (Javanese Surinamese)
- Macau: 7,000–16,000 (2016)
- New Caledonia: 4,100
- Thailand: 3,000

Languages
- Javanese (including Banyumas Javanese), Indonesian, English, Dutch, Malay, and other languages

Religion
- Mostly Islam (especially Sunni), some Christianity, Hinduism, Buddhism, and Kejawen

Related ethnic groups
- Native Indonesians and Overseas Indonesians

The Javanese diaspora (Javanese: ꦣꦶꦪꦱ꧀ꦥꦺꦴꦫꦗꦮ; Indonesian: Diaspora Jawa) is the demographic group of descendants of ethnic Javanese who emigrated from the Indonesian island of Java to other parts of the world. The Javanese diaspora includes a significant population in Suriname, with over 13% of the country's population being of Javanese ancestry. Other major enclaves are found in French Guiana, Malaysia, the Netherlands, New Caledonia, Singapore, South Africa, and Sri Lanka.

== History ==
Javanese were likely part of the Austronesian migration to Madagascar starting in the first century. While the migration was dominated by the Ma'anyan people of Borneo, Javanese involvement is evidenced by an abundance of loanwords in the Malagasy language.

During the late 16th century, numerous Javanese fleeing conflict between the Demak, the Pajang, and the Mataram, migrated to Palembang in southern Sumatra. There they established a sultanate and formed a mix of Malay and Javanese culture. Palembang language is a dialect of Malay language with heavy Javanese influence.

The Javanese were present in Peninsular Malaya since early times. The link between Java and Malacca was important during spread of Islam in Indonesia, when religious missionaries were sent from Malacca to seaports on the northern coast of Java. Large migrations to the Malay Peninsula occurred during the colonial period, mostly from Central Java to British Malaya. Migration also took place from 1880 to 1930 from other parts of Java with a secondary migration Javanese from Sumatra. Those migrations were to seek a new life away from the Dutch colonists who ruled Indonesia at that time. Today these people live throughout Peninsular Malaysia and are mainly concentrated in parts of Johor, Perak and Selangor and cities such as Kuala Lumpur.

New migration patterns emerged during colonial periods. During the rise of VOC power starting in the 17th century, many Javanese were exiled, enslaved or hired as mercenaries for the Dutch colonies of Ceylon in South Asia and the Cape colony in South Africa. These included princes and nobility who lost their dispute with the company and were exiled along with their retinues. These, along with exiles from other ethnicities like Bugis and Malay became the Sri Lankan Malay and Cape Malay ethnic groups respectively.

Major migrations started during the Dutch colonial period under transmigration programs. The Dutch needed many labourers for their plantations and moved many Javanese under the program as contract workers, mostly to other parts of the colony in Sumatra. They also sent Javanese workers to Suriname in South America. As of 2019, approximately 13.7% of the Suriname population is of Javanese ancestry. Outside of the Dutch colonies, Javanese workers were also sent to plantations administrated by the Dutch colonial government in New Caledonia, a French territory.

== Diaspora regions ==
=== Australia ===
The Javanese presence in Australia has been reported by native Southeast Asian and European people over several centuries. The most renowned record is from the itinerary of Chiaymasiouro, king of Demak, and Declaraçam de Malaca e India Meridional com o Cathay by Manuel Godinho de Eredia. Chiaymasiouro describes a land called Luca Antara in Southeast direction of Java, which Eredia coined the term India Meridional (Meridional India - Southern/South India). According to Chiaymasiouro's accounts (1601 AD), a subgroup of Javanese people already settled in those lands, but when Eredia's servant went to Luca Antara in 1610, the land had seemingly been abandoned.

==== Cocos (Keeling) Islands ====
The migration of Malays in Cocos (Keeling) Islands are believed to have arrived and settled in the islands in 1826 "when Alexander Hare, an English merchant, brought his Malay harem and slaves there." Nowadays, this ethnic group made significant population, known as Cocos Malays. Cocos Malays are an ethnic group composed of ethnic groups originating from different places of the Malay Archipelago, including Javanese and Malays.

=== French Guiana ===
French Guiana shares a land border with Suriname and both countries share many aspects of their culture. This situation makes probability that Javanese Surinamese immigrate to French Guiana from Suriname. Javanese French Guianans lives in French Guiana with approximately 3,000 population.

=== Malaysia ===
The majority of Javanese Malaysians originated from Central Java. The first wave came during the Shailendra era from the 6th to 9th centuries, then in the Singhasari and Majapahit era from the 12th to 14th centuries, there were also migrants from the Dutch East Indies looking for new opportunities in British Malaya. Many arrived through the colonial era, there are also who arrived through World War II to both Japanese-occupied British Malaya and Borneo as forced labour. In the present day, they live predominantly in the West Malaysian states of Johor, Perak and Selangor with significant minorities found in East Malaysia especially in the states of Sabah and Sarawak.

Most Malaysians of Javanese descent have assimilated into the local Malay culture, and speak Malaysian as a native tongue and first language rather than the Javanese language of their ancestors.

=== Netherlands ===
Indonesia was a colony of the Netherlands from 1605 until 1945. In the early 20th century, many Indonesian students studied in the Netherlands. Most of them lived in Leiden and were active in the Perhimpoenan Indonesia (Indonesian Association). During and after the Indonesian National Revolution, many Indo people, people of mixed Dutch and Indonesian ancestry migrated to the Netherlands. Furthermore, Javanese Surinamese also migrating to Netherlands and made population in the amount of 21,700.

=== New Caledonia ===
Javanese workers were sent to plantations administrated by the Dutch colonial government in New Caledonia, a French territory. Nowadays, Javanese New Caledonians make up 1.4% population of total population of New Caledonians.

=== Singapore ===
The second largest Malay group were the Javanese. They came from Java in the Dutch East Indies (modern Indonesia). In the 1931 Population Census, the number of Javanese in Singapore was 16,063. The 1981 Population Census, however, showed that they made up 6% of the Malay population. However, many Javanese had actually registered themselves as 'Malay'. It is likely that the actual percentage of the Javanese within the Malay population was much higher. An ethnographic study in 1990 estimated that approximately 50–60% of Singaporean Malays have at least some degree of Javanese ancestry. The Javanese came to Singapore in stages. In the mid-19th century, they came and worked as ironsmiths, leather makers as well as spice merchants and religious books dealers. There were also a group of Javanese printers and publishers in the Arab Street area. There were also community of pilgrim brokers that played an important role in encouraging the migration of the Javanese to Singapore.

After the Second World War, the total number of Javanese coming to Singapore continued to increase. The first wave consisted of conscript labour that were brought by the Japanese and their numbers were estimated to be about 10,000 (Turnbull, 1976:216). The second wave were those who moved to Singapore through Malaya. The 1970 Population Census showed that a total of 21,324 Malays who were born in Malaya (later Malaysia) had moved to Singapore in the years 1946–1955; and as many as 29,679 moved to Singapore from 1956 to 1970 (Census 1970:262-3). Interviews conducted showed that a majority of them were young men of Javanese descent from Johore who wanted to find a better life in Singapore. Most of them were not educated and not highly skilled and worked as manual labourers in the post war years.

In the 2010 census, Malays of Javanese descent numbered 89,000.

=== South Africa ===
Cape Malays are an ethnic group or community in South Africa. The name is derived from the Cape of Good Hope and the Malay race people originally from the Malay Archipelago, mostly from the Dutch East Indies colony (present-day Indonesia), a Dutch colony for several centuries, and Dutch Malacca, which the Dutch held from 1641 to 1824. The community's earliest members were enslaved Javanese transported by the Dutch East India Company (VOC). Key figures in the arrival of Islam were Muslim leaders who resisted the company's rule in Southeast Asia. Some, like Sheikh Yusuf, were exiled to South Africa by the company, which founded and used Cape Town as a resupply station for ships travelling between Europe and Asia.

=== Sri Lanka ===
Sri Lankan Malays first settled in the country when both Sri Lanka and Indonesia were Dutch colonies, while a second wave (1796–1948) came from the Malay Peninsula, when both Malaya and Sri Lanka were in the British Empire. However, Sri Lanka has had a longer history of Malay presence dating back to as early as the 13th century. Most of Sri Lankan Malays are of Javanese descent.

=== Suriname ===
After the abolition of slavery, the plantations in Suriname needed a new source of labor. In 1890, the influential Netherlands Trading Society, owner of the plantation Mariënburg in Suriname, undertook a test to attract Javanese indentured workers from the Dutch East Indies. Until then, primarily Indian indentured workers from British India worked at the Surinamese plantations as field and factory workers. On 9 August, the first Javanese arrived in Paramaribo. The test was considered successful and by 1894 the colonial government took over the task of recruiting Javanese hands. They came in small groups from the Dutch East Indies to the Netherlands, and from there to Paramaribo. The transport of Javanese immigrants continued until 1914 (except 1894) in two stages through Amsterdam.

The workers came from villages in Central and East Java. Departure points were Batavia, Semarang and Tandjong Priok. The recruited workers and their families awaited their departure in a depot, where they were inspected and registered and where they signed their contract.

A total of 32,965 Javanese immigrants went to Suriname. In 1954, 8,684 Javanese returned to Indonesia, with the rest remaining in Suriname. The census of 1972 counted 57,688 Javanese in Suriname, and in 2004 there were 71,879. In addition, in 2004 more than 60,000 people of mixed descent were recorded, with an unknown number of part Javanese descent.

== See also ==
- Javanese people
- Overseas Indonesians
- Overseas Acehnese
- Overseas Malays
- Overseas Minangkabau
- Moluccan diaspora
