= Martin Addy =

British academic

Martin Addy is emeritus professor of dentistry at the University of Bristol, where he established the clinical trials unit and the research laboratories, and where his research has focussed on oral hygiene products, tooth wear and hypersensitivity of teeth. He has been campaigning to improve oral hygiene during the COVID-19 pandemic.

== Selected publications ==
- Addy, Martin; Edgar, W. Michael; Embery, Graham; Orchardson, Robin (2000). Tooth Wear and Sensitivity: Clinical Advances in Restorative Dentistry. Taylor & Francis. ISBN 978-1-85317-826-9.
