= Melee (disambiguation) =

Melee was a form of "mixed" combat at medieval tournaments.

A melee or mêlée may also refer to:

- Hand-to-hand combat
- Close-quarters battle
- Armored combat (sport), the modern revival of medieval melee

== Gaming ==
- Melee (game), a board game by Metagaming Concepts
- Mêlée Island, a locale in the Monkey Island series, primarily in The Secret of Monkey Island (1990)
- Melee Pokémon Scramble, the translated Japanese name of Pokémon Rumble
- Super Smash Bros. Melee, a platform fighting game released for the Nintendo GameCube in 2001

== Music ==
- Melee (Gizmachi album)
- Melee (Dogleg album)
- Mêlée (band), an alternative rock band
  - Mêlée (EP), a 2002 EP by Mêlée
- "Melee" (song), a 2019 song by Tory Lanez

== Other uses ==
- Robert Melee (born 1966), American artist
- Melee (comics), the code name of a fictional Marvel comic book character
- Melée, small cut gem diamonds
- Scrum (rugby), known in French as mêlée
