= Siti Setiati =

Indonesian physician, university administrator

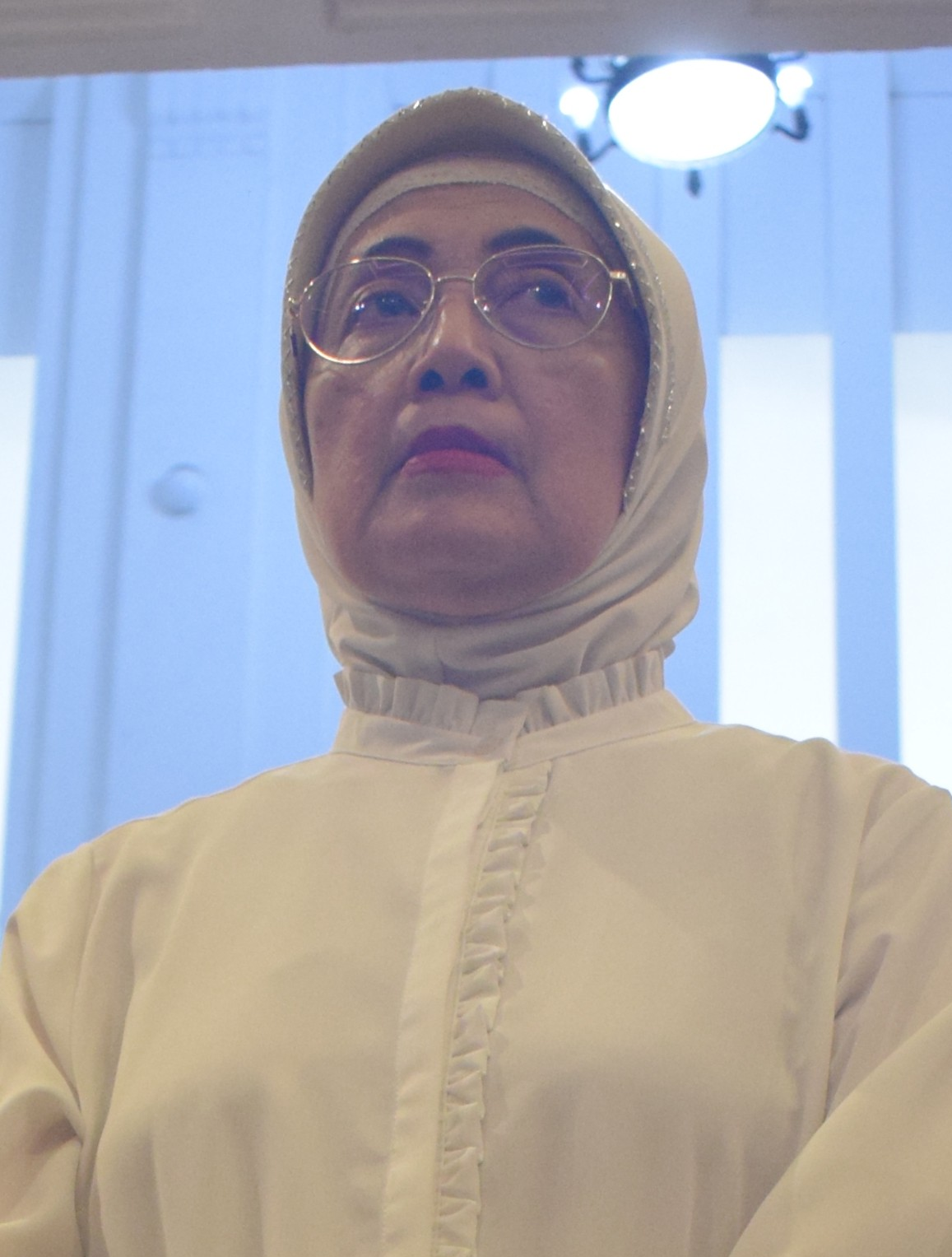

Deputy Rector of the University of Indonesia for Research, Development, and Industry Cooperation
- In office 28 June 2013 – 15 December 2014
- Preceded by: Sunardji
- Succeeded by: Rosari Saleh

Personal details
- Born: 15 October 1961 (age 64) Bandung, Indonesia
- Education: University of Indonesia

Siti Setiati (born 15 October 1961) is an Indonesian physician, university administrator, and a professor of internal medicine at the University of Indonesia. She has held a number of academic positions in the University of Indonesia, including as Deputy Rector for Research, Development, and Industry Cooperation from 2013 to 2014. She is currently the chairwoman of the Council of Professors of the University of Indonesia Faculty of Medicine.

== Early life and education ==
Siti Setiati was born in Bandung, Indonesia, on 15 October 1961. She began her medical education at the Faculty of Medicine, University of Indonesia, in 1980 and completed her medical degree in 1986. Following her initial training, she pursued a specialization in internal medicine at the same institution, graduating in 1996. Her interest in geriatric medicine led her to undertake postgraduate studies in the Department of Geriatric and Rehabilitation Medicine at the Royal Adelaide Hospital in Australia from 1996 to 1997.

Setiati continued her advanced training with a consultant program in geriatric internal medicine at the Collegium of Internal Medicine, Faculty of Medicine, University of Indonesia, from 1997 to 2000. She further expanded her expertise by completing a postgraduate program in clinical epidemiology at the Faculty of Public Health, University of Indonesia, from 2001 to 2003, and subsequently earned a doctoral degree in clinical epidemiology from the same institution after studying from 2003 to 2006.

== Career ==
Siti Setiati began her professional career as the head of the Sei Purun and Batu Ampar Community Health Centers in Pontianak, West Kalimantan, serving from 1987 to 1990. Her clinical focus shifted toward geriatric medicine, and she became the lead physician at the Integrated Elderly Services Clinic at Cipto Mangunkusumo Hospital in Jakarta from 1998 to 2004. Her interest in geriatric care was reinforced by an encounter in the early 2000s with a patient accompanied by a middle-aged woman who was not a direct relative but cared for the patient out of a sense of religious duty.

Setiati’s clinical practice is based at both Cipto Mangunkusumo Hospital and Medistra Hospital in Jakarta. She has noted that caring for elderly patients requires patience and diligence, as consultations often take up to an hour per patient, though this time may decrease with regular follow-up visits. She has expressed a particular interest in working with older adults, citing her appreciation for their life experiences and perspectives.

Setiati has held numerous academic and organizational positions. She has served as a lecturer in the Department of Internal Medicine at the Faculty of Medicine, University of Indonesia, since 1996. She has coordinated research and financial administration in the Division of Geriatrics since 2004 and has been the head of the Scientific Division of the Indonesian Society of Medical Gerontology since 2004. Setiati has also been involved in medical publishing as the head of the Publishing Center in the Department of Internal Medicine at the University of Indonesia since 2006 and as an editor for the Indonesian Medical Journal from 2002 to 2003. Setiati is also affiliated with several professional organizations, including the Indonesian Medical Association (IDI), the Indonesian Society of Internal Medicine Specialists (PAPDI), and the Indonesian Society of Medical Gerontology (Pergemi).

Her additional roles include serving as secretary of the Clinical Epidemiology Unit in the Department of Internal Medicine at the University of Indonesia since 2005, secretary of the Collegium of Internal Medicine since 2003, and coordinator of the first stage of the Internal Medicine Specialist Education Program since 2004. She was also a member of the Continuing Medical Education Program at the Faculty of Medicine, University of Indonesia, from 2000 to 2005.

On 28 June 2013, during the transitional period in the University of Indonesia, Siti assumed office as the Deputy Rector for Research, Development, and Industry Cooperation. During her tenure, on 7 September 2013 she read her inaugural lecture as a full professor in internal medicine, titled Geriatric Medicine, Sarcopenia, Frailty, and Quality of Life in Elderly Patients. In her capacity, he oversaw the university's accreditation by the ASEAN University Network. She completed her tenure after a year on 15 December 2014.

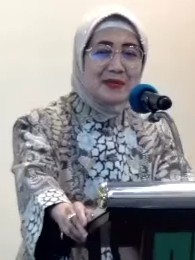
Siti Setiati delivering a speech in 2024.

Afterwards, since 2020, she became the Council of Professors of the University of Indonesia Faculty of Medicine. During the first days of the pandemic in Indonesia, Siti issued a recommendation to President Joko Widodo to implement a partial lockdown on provinces that were already infected by the virus. After the message was issued, University of Indonesia rector Ari Kuncoro stated that Siti did not represent the university and many professors in the university disagreed with her suggestion.

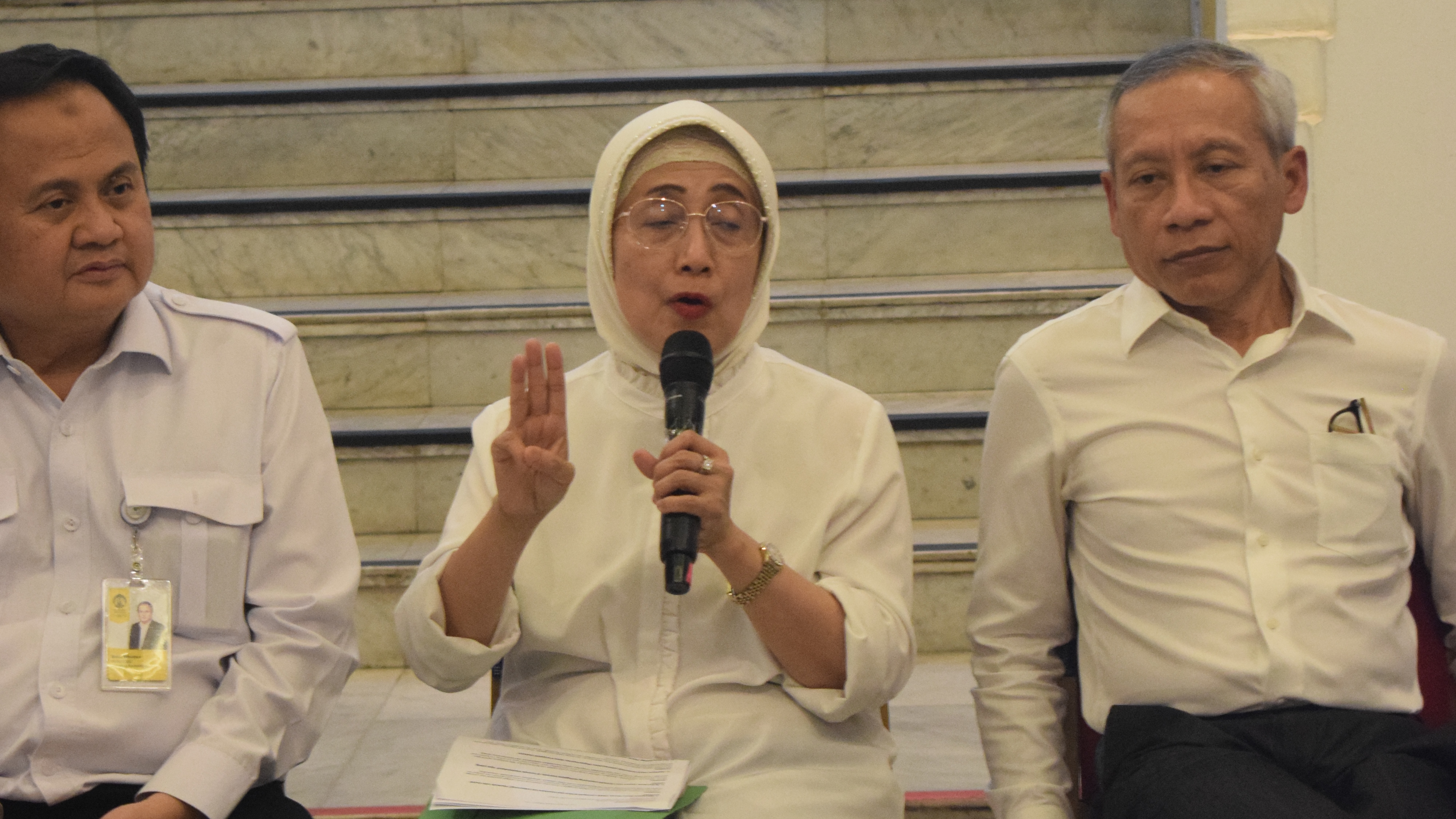
Siti at the press conference, 16 May 2025.

On 16 May 2025, Siti and other full professors in the medicine faculty issued a statement of concern on the government's health and medicine policy. The professors warned that the new policy could disrupt medical education ecosystems and jeopardize the independency of the medicine collegium system in Indonesia.
