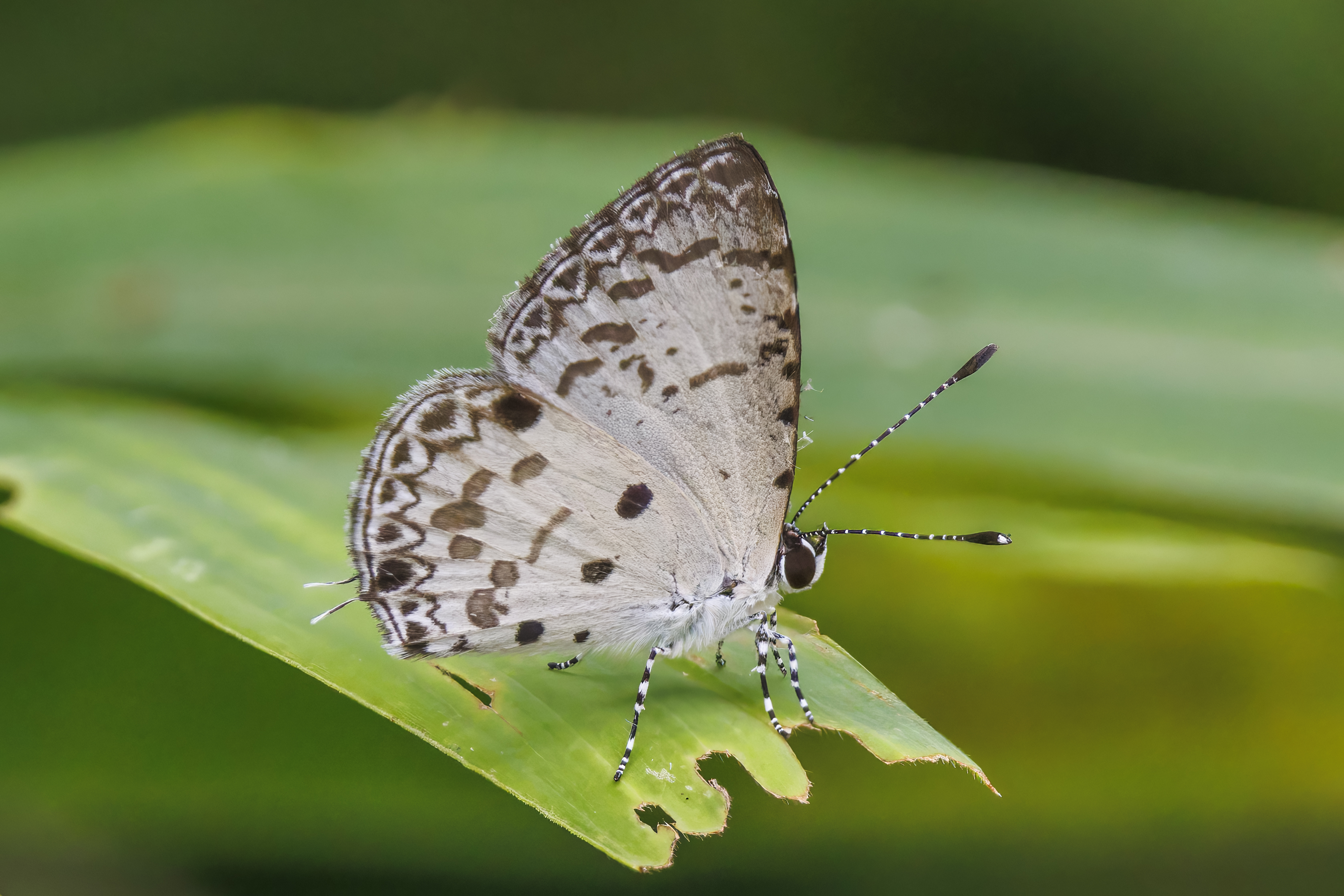
- M. m. sikkima, Hong Kong

Scientific classification
- Kingdom: Animalia
- Phylum: Arthropoda
- Clade: Pancrustacea
- Class: Insecta
- Order: Lepidoptera
- Family: Lycaenidae
- Genus: Megisba
- Species: M. malaya

Binomial name
- Megisba malaya (Horsfield, 1828)

Synonyms
- Lycaena malaya Horsfield, 1828

= Megisba malaya =

Malayan

Species of butterfly

Megisba malaya, the Malayan, is a small species of butterfly found in South Asia and Southeast Asia. It belongs to the family of gossamer-winged butterflies (Lycaenidae). The species was first described by Thomas Horsfield in 1928.

It ranges from Sri Lanka and southern India to Bengal, and from Kumaon to Assam in India and Nepal, onto Myanmar. The butterfly is also found in Andaman and Nicobar Islands. It is usually not a rare species, but may be less common, even rare, in parts of its range.

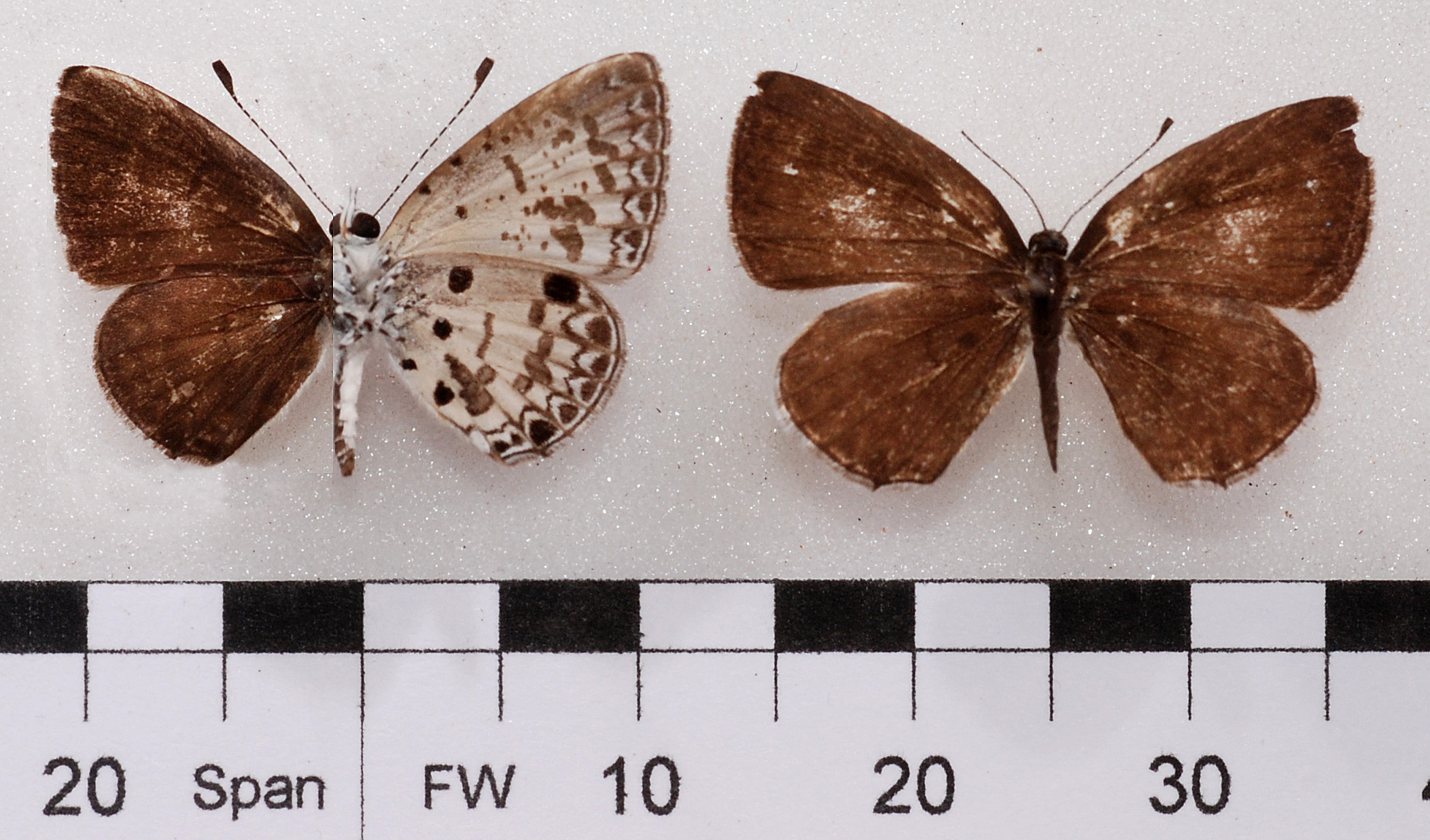

== Description ==
This butterfly resembles the Quaker (Neopithecops zalmora), especially in flight. The female Malayan has a broader and more rounded forewing than the male.

Wet-season form: Upperside: from dull somewhat pale brown to dark brown, some specimens nearly uniform, others with a more or less distinct pale discal patch on the forewing. Hindwing: uniform; a slender short filamentous tail at apex of vein 1, very often absent. Underside: white. Forewing: with the following brown markings: a spot in cell, a transverse short line on the discocellulars, a postdiscal curved series of transverse spots or very short bars that cross the wing from costa to dorsum and are in irregular echelon one with the other, followed by a slender transverse broken line, a subterminal series of broader transverse spots and an anteciliary slender line; at apex of wing the markings are diffuse and form a very small brown-shaded patch, while further inwards along the costa veins 10, 11 and 12 terminate in a minute brown dot. Hindwing: three spots near base in transverse order, a large, conspicuous, rounded, subcostal and a smaller similar spot near the middle of the dorsum, black; between the latter two and also along the discocellulars are some irregular much paler brown transverse spots on the disc, which are followed as on the forewing by an outer postdiscal, very slender brown line, a subterminal series of brown or black spots, and a black anteciliary line. Cilia of forewings and hindwings white, turning to dark brown at apex of forewing. Antennae, head, thorax and abdomen dark brown, the antenna ringed narrowly with white; beneath: the palpi, thorax and abdomen snow-white, the third, slender acicular joint of the palpi conspicuously brown.

Dry-season brood: Very similar to the wet-season brood, but the forewing on the upperside bears a large, oval, obliquely-placed conical patch that extends from the middle of the dorsal margin to vein 4. In certain specimens this white bar or patch is continued on to the hindwing. Underside: similar to that of the wet-season form but all the markings broader, coarser, more prominent. Forewing: costa and apex in some specimens broadly shaded with diffuse fuscous brown; the outer postdiscal brown line formed into a series of lunules that extend outwards slenderly along the veins and join the anteciliary brown line, thus enclosing in the interspaces a series of spots of the white ground colour, each of which is centred with a black or dark brown subtriangular spot. Hindwing: the terminal markings modified as on the forewing; the spot in interspace 3 of the subterminal series larger and more prominent than the others, the large subcostal black spot often broken by an anterior and a posterior silvery spot superposed on it. Antennae, head, thorax and abdomen as in specimens of the wet-season brood but slightly darker above.

Subspecies include:

- Megisba malaya presbyter Fruhstorfer – Central and South Nicobars. Rare. Validity requires confirmation.
- Megisba malaya sikkima Moore – Kumaon to Myanmar. Andamans. Not rare. Tailed.
- Megisba malaya thwaitesi Moore – Sri Lanka, South India to Bengal. Not rare. Tailless.

The tailed and tailless subspecies are sympatric in Sikkim, the tailed one is more commonly found at lower altitudes.

== Ecology and life history ==
The Malayan is a butterfly of evergreen forests. Its caterpillar is light green, vermiform, the middle segments swollen; it feeds on Allophyllus cobbe (Sapindaceae). The pupa is thick, with blunted ends.

Adults fly low, close to the ground. This species is often seen in forest glades and forest edges. The males frequent cow dung and damp patches for mud-puddling, but at least on Borneo and probably elsewhere too not generally carrion or old fruit.
