= Malay diaspora =

Diaspora of Malay

The Malay diaspora consists of Malay people who live outside of their native homeland of Malaysia, Indonesia & Brunei. These countries are known to be areas of where the Malay Diasporas originally came from. Singapore and Parts of Southern Thailand also belongs to the Malay Peninsular, as they share historical ties and migration patterns with these three countries. Originally, the Malay ethnic group are thought to have started in Borneo, stretching out to Eastern Sumatra, before expanding into modern day Malaysia and Singapore.

== Statistics ==
=== Asia ===
- Yunnan of China
- Cambodia

Malays: 15,000

- Myanmar (Burma)

Burmese Malays: 26,000

- Philippines

Malays: 2,000,000

- Singapore

Malays: 600,000 (Local Overseas Malay + Native Orang Laut Population)

- Thailand

Malays: 1,500,000 (Local Overseas Malay Population)

- Sri Lanka

Sri Lankan Malays are also known as Ja-minissu: 50,000

- Japan

Malays: 12,000

=== Africa ===
- South Africa

There are 253,000 Cape Malays living in South Africa. These are a population of multi-racial ancestry.

=== Oceania ===
- Australia

Australia's ethnic Malay population number around 10,000 people.

- New Zealand

Malays: 2,200

=== North America ===
- Canada

Malays: 16,920

- United States

There are over 100,000 Malays living in the United States.

=== Europe ===
- United Kingdom

The Malay population in the United Kingdom is 50,000.

== See also ==
- Javanese diaspora
- Malaysian diaspora
