= USS Malay =

Patrol vessel of the United States Navy

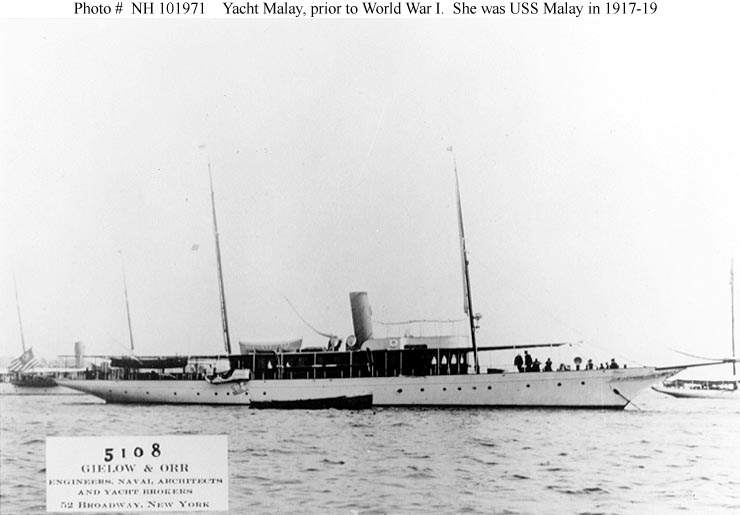
- Malay as a private yacht sometime between 1898 and 1917.

History

United States
- Name: USS Malay
- Namesake: Previous name retained
- Builder: Delaware River Iron Ship Building and Engine Works, Chester, Pennsylvania
- Completed: 1898
- Acquired: 28 April 1917
- Commissioned: 16 June 1917
- Fate: Returned to owner 1 March 1919
- Notes: Operated as private yacht Malay 1898-1917 and 1919-1921; sold 1921

General characteristics
- Type: Patrol vessel
- Tonnage: 173 Gross register tons
- Length: 150 ft (46 m)
- Beam: 20 ft (6.1 m)
- Draft: 8 ft 7 in (2.62 m)
- Propulsion: Steam engine
- Speed: 15 knots
- Complement: 29
- Armament: 2 × 3-pounder guns; 1 × machine gun; 1 × Y-gun

USS Malay (SP-735) was a United States Navy patrol vessel in commission from 1917 to 1919.

Malay was built as a private steam yacht of the same name in 1898 by Delaware River Iron Ship Building and Engine Works at Chester, Pennsylvania. On 28 April 1917, the U.S. Navy acquired her under a free lease from her owner, Hannah P. Weld of Boston, Massachusetts, for use as a section patrol vessel during World War I. She was commissioned as USS Malay (SP-735) on 16 June 1917.

Malay patrolled waters along the United States East Coast for the rest of World War I.

On 1 March 1919, the Navy returned Malay to Weld, who sold her to a buyer from Honduras in 1921.
