= SS Malay (1921) =

American oil tanker (1921–1945)

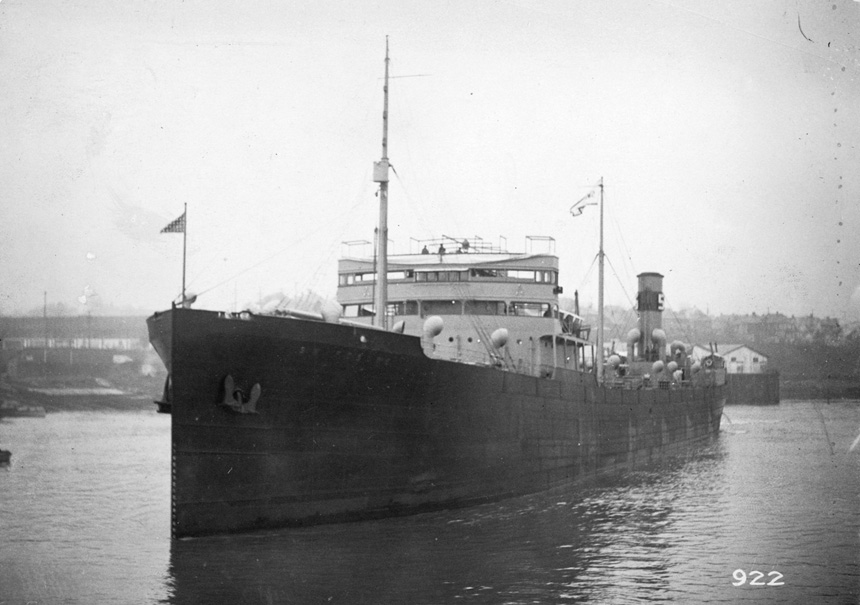
- Malay as Swiftsure on May 15, 1921

History

United States
- Name: Swiftsure; Malay; Loidesta
- Namesake: Swiftsure Oil Transport Company; Malays, an ethnic group
- Owner: Swiftsure Oil Transport Company (c. 1921); Marine Transport Line (c. 1942); Compania Maritima Ador S.A. (after November 28, 1945)
- Operator: C. D. Mallory & Company. (c. 1942); Grosvenor-Dale Company (after April 9, 1942)
- Builder: Northwest Steel Company
- Yard number: Yard number: 46
- Launched: December 15, 1920
- Completed: January 1921
- Identification: Official number: 221304; Radio call sign: KDSI; USSB number: 2865

General characteristics
- Type: Oil tanker
- Tonnage: 8,206 GRT; 5,092 NRT
- Length: 481.067 feet (146.629 m) (overall); 465.583 feet (141.910 m) (between perpendiculars)
- Beam: 60 feet (18 m)
- Draft: 26.583 feet (8.102 m)
- Capacity: 11,900 deadweight tons
- Crew: 34 men

SS Malay was an American oil tanker built in 1921. She was attacked by the German submarine U-123 on January 19, 1942. She escaped and was repaired, serving throughout the remainder of World War II.

== Construction ==
The tanker was laid down as yard number 46, originally named Swiftsure. She was built by the Northwest Steel Company in Portland, Oregon. She was launched on December 15, 1920 and completed in June 1921. She was assigned the official number 221304, the radio call sign KDSI, and the United States Shipping Board (USSB) number 2865.

=== Specifications ===
Swiftsure had an overall length of 481.067 feet (146.629 m), a length between perpendiculars of 465.583 feet (141.910 m), a molded beam of 60 feet (18 m), and a load draft of 26.583 feet (8.102 m). She had a gross register tonnage of 8,206, a net register tonnage of 5,092, a capacity of 11,900 deadweight tons, and a crew of 34 men.

The tanker had six cargo hatches for "the cargo that she carried in the 'tween deck over the tank tops and in a forward hold and nine cargo tanks and five summer tanks for her oil cargo."

== Service history ==
Swiftsure was originally owned by the Swiftsure Oil Transport Company. As of 1942, she was owned by the Marine Transport Line and operated by C. D. Mallory & Company. Sometime between 1921 and 1942, she was renamed Malay.

On November 13, 1937, Swiftsure encountered the survivors of the cargo ship Tzenny Chandris, which had sunk in a storm off Hatteras, North Carolina, on the night of November 12–13. The tanker picked up 6 men in a lifeboat shortly after 9:30 AM and reported that 8 more were adrift in lifebelts, while 12 to 14 others were in a small boat. She joined in search efforts for the remainder of the survivors later that night.

=== Torpedoing ===
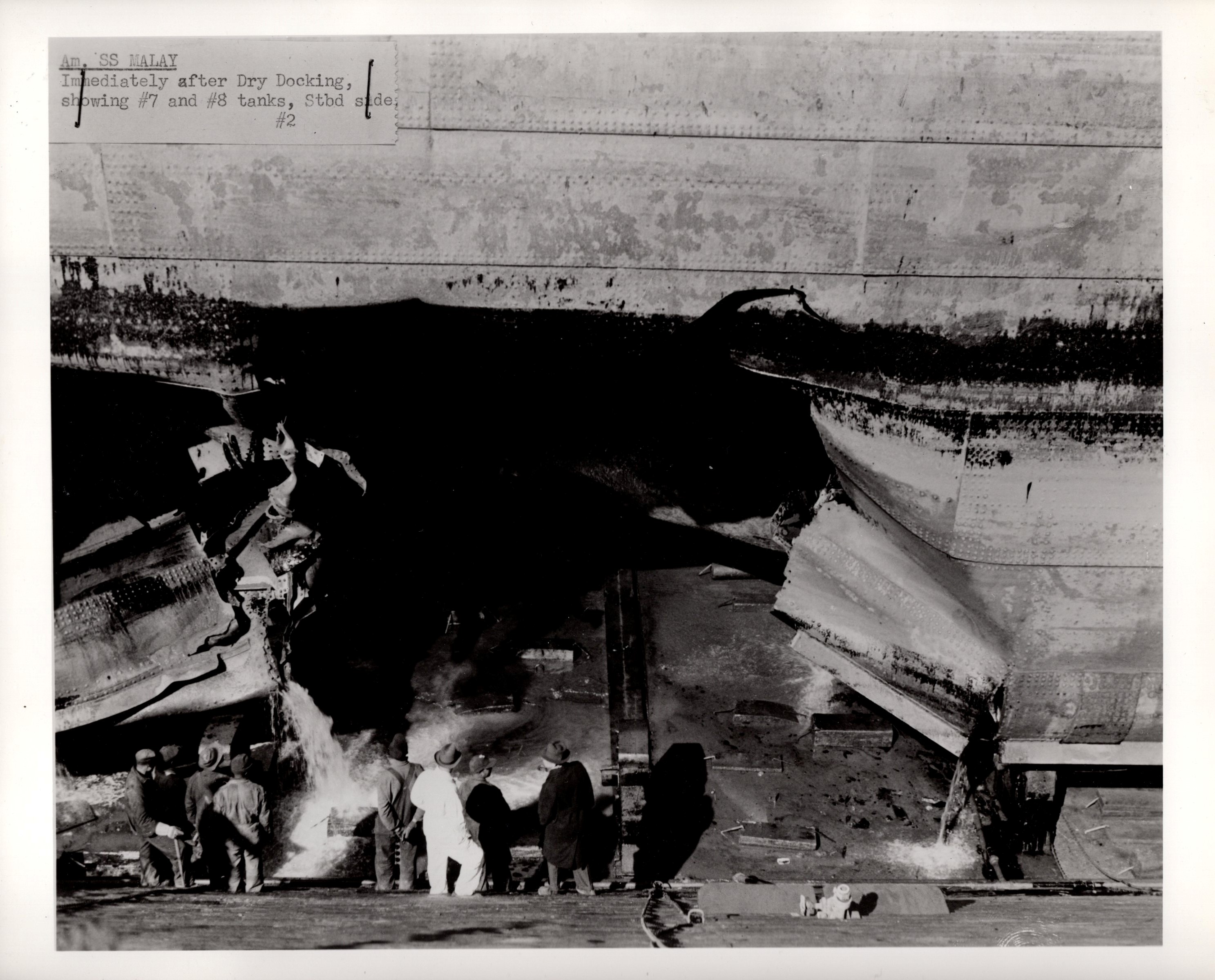
A gaping hole in the starboard side of Malay, between the #7 and #8 tanks.

On January 18, 1942, Malay departed Philadelphia in water ballast, en route for Port Arthur, Texas. The tanker was captained by John M. Dodge. She traveled with only her navigational lights showing, in the lead position of an unarmed convoy consisting of five ships.

About 10 miles (16 km) from the Wimble Shoals Lighted Whistle Buoy, at 0930 hours on January 19, the German submarine U-123 spotted the convoy. The submarine advanced on Malay while surfaced, and its gun crew began firing at the tanker's bridge. The submarine fired a total of 10 rounds and struck the ship five times from a distance of roughly 700 yards (640 m). The second shell to hit destroyed a lifeboat, and one of the last three killed the cook who was in his in sleeping quarters. The submarine did not use any torpedoes, not realizing the tanker's size.

U-123 assumed that the tanker was fatally wounded and left to search for other vessels. A passing Swedish freighter, Scania, came to assist Malay and passed firefighting equipment to the tanker. The fire was extinguished and the tanker was able to get underway again after reporting the attack. This message was intercepted by U-123, which crew was shocked at the size of Malay and recognized its value. The U-boat torpedoed the merchant ship Ciltvaira before returning.

U-123 returned and fired its last torpedo at 1244 hours, which struck the #7 starboard side tank, just aft of admiships. Three lifeboats were launched from Malay. The first boat capsized and drowned the four men aboard, and the other two circled the tanker for about an hour before returning to her. Shortly after daylight, a US Coast Guard boat from the Chicamacomico Life-Saving Station removed the dead and badly injured. Malay returned to Norfolk, Virginia, on January 19.

=== Post-torpedoing service ===
On April 9, 1942, Malay was acquired from the Marine Transport Line by the War Shipping Administration (WSA). That same day, the WSA chartered the tanker to the Grosvenor-Dale Company. On November 28, 1945, she was sold to the Compania Maritima Ador S.A. and was renamed Loidesta.
