= Malay names =

The Malay ethnic group spread across Thailand, Malaysia, Singapore, Indonesia, Brunei in Southeast Asia as far as South Africa have their own naming system.

Most Malays unlike the Chinese, Thai and Westerners, do not have surnames but rather patronyms similar to Icelandic naming conventions; surnames are often found with Malays of mixed descent with cultures that do have surnames (e.g. Aishah Sinclair who has a British father, Bront Palarae who has a Thai mother, and so on); or living in countries ruled by a system that enforces them by peoples that have those surnames (e.g. Thai Malays due to mandatory government policy like "Jehdueramae" from "Haji Abdurrahman").

== Overall ==
=== Structure ===
A Malay's name is patronymic consisting of a personal name (nama daging "flesh name" or nama kerat pusat "navel snip-name"), used to address them in all circumstances, almost always followed by an appendage to the father with bin (from Arabic بن, meaning 'son of', abbreviated to b.) or binti (from the Arabic بنت, meaning 'daughter of' abbreviated to bt., bte. or bint.), or anak (as is the case in Sarawak), followed by their father's personal name. If Osman has a son called Musa, Musa will be known as Musa bin Osman. Thus, if Musa has a daughter called Aisyah, Aisyah will be known as Aisyah binti Musa. In general practice, most Malays omit the title Bin or Binti from their names thus the two examples above would be known as Musa Osman and Aisyah Musa; which foreigners often mistaken for a family or surname, when it is not.

Upon marriage, a woman does not change her name, as is done in many cultures. Addressing someone as just "of [father's name]" is considered very rude, as well as addressing a lady by their spouse. When someone is referred to using only one name, the first given name is always used, never the second.

Until the 20th century, it was considered taboo to use one's own name to address oneself; nicknames are given instead from childhood.

=== Personal names ===
Malay names at first were straightforward after flowers (like Melur 'jasmine' or Kiambang 'Pistia') or attributes (Tuah, 'luck'). Later, Hindu-Buddhist traditions bestowed Sanskrit or Pali via Javanese such as Wira, Darma, Wati, Ratnasari, Joyo or Kesuma.

Arabic names were introduced naturally with arrival of Islam in Southeast Asia; these were sometimes adapted to suit native Malay phonotactics, this is still reflected in the rural communities:

- Sharif would be "Sarip",
- Aziz would become "Ajis",
- Yusuf (Joseph) becomes "Usop",
- Yaaqub (Jacob) becomes "Akob"
- Ghazali becomes "Razali" (also anglicized as "Razaleigh")
- Latifah becomes "Tipah"

The Muslim theophoric name appended with abd yields unique names: Abdullah becomes "Dolah" (e.g. Elias Dolah, Wahab Dolah) or "Dullah", Abdul Hamid becomes "Duhamid", Abd al-Rahman becomes "Deraman", and Abdul Ghani becomes "Abdurani"; such names are dying out with old generations in Malaysia due to modernization and standardization of names.

Sanskrit names still remain in use although more rare in modern Malaysia than among some contemporary Thai Malays gained through Thai: e.g. "Surin" related to Sanskrit सुरेन्द्र Surendra, "Supachai" ultimately from सुभजय Subhajaya.

=== Nicknames ===
Malays of the Peninsular have a unique convention of nicknames or "cradle names" (timang-timangan) based on the order of their birth:

- the eldest born (sulung) is Pak/Mak Long
- the second (tengah, 'middle') is Pak/Mak Ngah
- third (alang, 'middling'), is Pak/Mak Lang
- fourth (panjang, 'long') is Pak Panjang/Mak Anjang
- fifth (pandak, 'short') is Pak/Mak Andak
- sixth (muda, 'young') is Pak/Mak Uda
- the youngest (bongsu) is Pak/Mak Su.

These appelations may become native names in their own right, like Sulong Abdulkadir, Long Jaafar, Ngah Ibrahim and so on.

Muslim clerics often have Arabized nisba indicating their origin.

== See also ==
- Malay styles and titles
- Icelandic name
- Jewish name
- Javanese name
