= SS Ambria =

German cargo ship

History
- Name: Ambria (1922–34); Gumbinnen (1934–45); Empire Conleith (1945–46); Dragnes (1946–47); Mimona (1947–59); Malay (1959–61)
- Owner: Hamburg Amerikanische Packetfahrt Actiengesellschaft (1922–28); Deutsche Levant Linie (1928–34); Kohlen-Import & Poseidon Schiffahrt AG (1928–45); Ministry of War Transport (1945); Ministry of Transport (1945–46); Norwegian Government (1946–47); K Andersen & Co (1947–59); T Halvorsen AS (1959–61)
- Operator: Hamburg Amerikanische Packetfahrt Actiengesellschaft (1922–28); Deutsche Levant Linie (1928–34); Kohlen Import & Poseidon Schiffahrt AG (1928–45); Ministry of War Transport (1945); Ministry of Transport (1945–46); Norwegian Government (1946–47); K Andersen & Co (1947–59); T Halvorsen AS (1959–61)
- Port of registry: (Weimar Republic) Hamburg (1922–33); (Nazi Germany) Hamburg (1933–34); (Nazi Germany) Königsberg (1934–40); (Nazi Germany) Nordenham (1940–45); (United Kingdom) London (1945–47); (Norway) Oslo (1947–61)
- Builder: Deutsche Werft
- Yard number: 20
- Launched: 26 August 1922
- Identification: Code Letters RCVQ (1922–34); Code Letters DHBA (1934–45); Code Letters GSMY (1945–46); United Kingdom Official Number 180713 (1945–46)
- Fate: Scrapped

General characteristics
- Type: Cargo ship
- Tonnage: 1,380 GRT; 800 NRT; 2,091 DWT
- Length: 234 ft 5 in (71.45 m)
- Beam: 36 ft 8 in (11.18 m)
- Depth: 17 ft 9 in (5.41 m)
- Installed power: 2 steam turbines (1922–35); Compound steam engine (1935–61)
- Propulsion: Screw propeller
- Speed: 9 knots (17 km/h)
- Crew: 20
- Notes: Sister ship Arcadia

Ambria was a cargo ship that was built in 1922 by Deutsche Werft, Finkenwerder for German owners. She was sold in 1934 and renamed Gumbinnen. She was sunk by a British destroyer in 1941, raised and repaired. Gumbinnen was seized by the Allies in Flensburg, in May 1945, passed to the Ministry of War Transport (MoWT) and renamed Empire Conleith. In 1946, she was allocated to the Norwegian Government and renamed Dragnes. She was sold into Norwegian merchant service and renamed Mimona. In 1959, she was sold and renamed Malay. She served until 1961 when she was scrapped.

== Description ==
The ship was built in 1922 as yard number 20 by Deutsche Werft, Finkenwerder.

The ship was 234 feet 5 inches (71.45 m) long, with a beam of 36 feet 8 inches (11.18 m). She had a depth of 17 feet 9 inches (5.41 m). The ship had a GRT of 1,380 and a NRT of 800. She had a deadweight tonnage of 2,081.

As built, the ship was propelled by two steam turbines, double reduction geared, driving a single screw propeller. The turbines were built by Allgemeine Elektricitäts-Gesellschaft, Berlin.

== History ==
Ambria was built for Hamburg-Amerika Packetfahrt AG, Hamburg. The Code Letters RCVQ were allocated. She was launched on 26 August 1922. On 25 August 1926, Ambria was in collision with the British steamship Mimi off the Longships Lighthouse. She was beached at Penzance, Cornwall. In 1928, she was sold to Deutsche Levant Linie AG, Bremen. In 1934 Her Code Letters were changed to DHBA. Also in 1934, Ambria was sold to Kohlen-Import & Poseidon Schiffahrt AG, Königsberg and was renamed Gumbinnen. In 1934, Gumbinnen was re-engined. A compound steam engine with two cylinders of 13 inches (33 cm) and two cylinders of 27 9/16 inches (70 cm) diameter by 27 9/16 inches (70 cm) stroke was fitted. The engine was built by F Schichau GmbH, Elbing. It could propel the ship at 9 knots (17 km/h).

In 1940, her port of registry was changed to Nordenham. On 3 March 1941, Gumbinnen was sunk in Solvær harbour, Lofoten Islands, Norway, by HMS Tartar. She was raised and repaired at Gothenburg, Sweden. In May 1945, Gumbinnen was seized by the Allies at Flensburg. Ownership passed to the MoWT and she was placed under the management of A F Henry & MacGregor Ltd. Her port of registry was changed to London. The Code letters GSMY and United Kingdom Official Number 180713 were allocated.

In 1946, Empire Conleith was allocated to the Norwegian Government and was renamed Dragnes. She was sold to K Andersen & Co in 1947 and renamed Mimona. In 1959, she was sold to T Halvorsen AS and renamed Malay. She served until 1961 when she was scrapped in Grimstad.
