= William Francis Gibbs =

American naval architect (1886–1967)

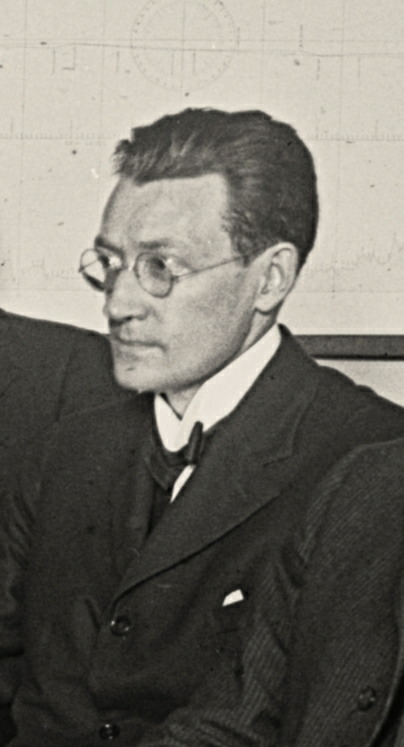
- Gibbs in 1924
- Born: August 24, 1886; Philadelphia, Pennsylvania, U.S.
- Died: September 6, 1967 (aged 81); New York, New York, U.S.
- Education: Harvard College; Columbia Law School
- Occupation: Naval architect

William Francis Gibbs (August 24, 1886 – September 6, 1967) was an American naval architect of the mid-twentieth century.

Although he began his career as an attorney, after World War I, he became recognized as a skilled project manager in the restoration of the former German ocean liner ᛊᛊ Vaterland for American use. In 1922, in partnership with his brother Frederic Herbert Gibbs, he began the firm that would eventually become Gibbs & Cox; they were among the major designers of World War II-era warships and cargo vessels, including the Liberty ships and Fletcher-class destroyers. Gibbs was a pioneer in the areas of efficient hull design and propulsion, along with being a staunch advocate for high standards of fire prevention and hull integrity. Although the Liberty ships were designed with a priority of production simplicity and economy, other Gibbs designs tended to be sturdy, light, fast, safe, and enduring.

In 1938, Gibbs was asked by then Mayor La Guardia to design what would become the largest and most powerful fireboat in the world for the Fire Department of New York. Named Fire Fighter, the 134-foot (41 m) 586–ton fireboat went on to fight numerous large fires in her long 72-year career, and was given the Gallant Ship Award by MARAD in 1974 for its heroic efforts by ship and crew during the 1973 Sea Witch-Esso Brussels collision, fire and explosion beneath the Verrazano-Narrows Bridge.

During the late 1940s and early 1950s, the Gibbs brothers were among the promoters leading the United States government and military to subsidize the cost of building the ultimate ocean liner. In the end, Gibbs and Cox was awarded the contract to design and supervise the building of SS United States, which entered service in 1952. While in the class of the largest liners, it was much lighter and considerably faster than contemporary vessels. It was built with a high emphasis on safety, using a minimum of flammable materials.

== Early years ==
Gibbs was born in Philadelphia on August 24, 1886, to financier William Warren Gibbs and Frances Ayres (Johnson) Gibbs. He graduated from the DeLancey School in 1905 then entered Harvard College where he followed his own curriculum of science and engineering, studying plans of British battleships in his dormitory room. He left without a degree in 1910. He then attended Columbia Law School from 1911 to 1913, receiving a Bachelor of Law and Master of Arts in economics, both in 1913. At his father's request, he practiced law for the next two years.

While working as a lawyer, Gibbs visited the family home each weekend and, together with his brother Frederic Herbert Gibbs, began designs for a 1,000-foot-long (300 m) ocean liner capable of producing 180,000 horsepower. The design had progressed to a point that he left the law firm in May 1915; in January 1916 the brothers presented their plans to Admiral David W. Taylor and Secretary of the Navy Josephus Daniels. The response was encouraging, and the brothers, with the financial backing of J. P. Morgan and the United States Navy, then approached the International Mercantile Marine Company (IMMC) later that year. Although a model was tested in the Experimental Model Basin at the Washington Navy Yard, World War I put an end to these early designs. Gibbs became Chief of Construction for IMMC in 1919.

== Gibbs & Cox ==
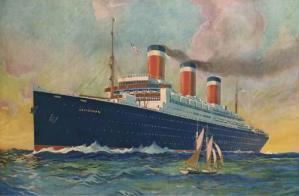
SS Leviathan by an unknown artist (1925)

In February 1922, the Gibbs brothers started their own naval architecture firm, Gibbs Brothers, Inc.; their first major contract was to convert the former German liner Vaterland into the American luxury liner SS Leviathan. When shipbuilders Blohm + Voss asked over $1 million for the original plans, Gibbs decided to draw his own. Between 100 and 150 draftsmen documented the existing ship and designed its new layout. Gibbs Brothers was renamed Gibbs & Cox in 1929.

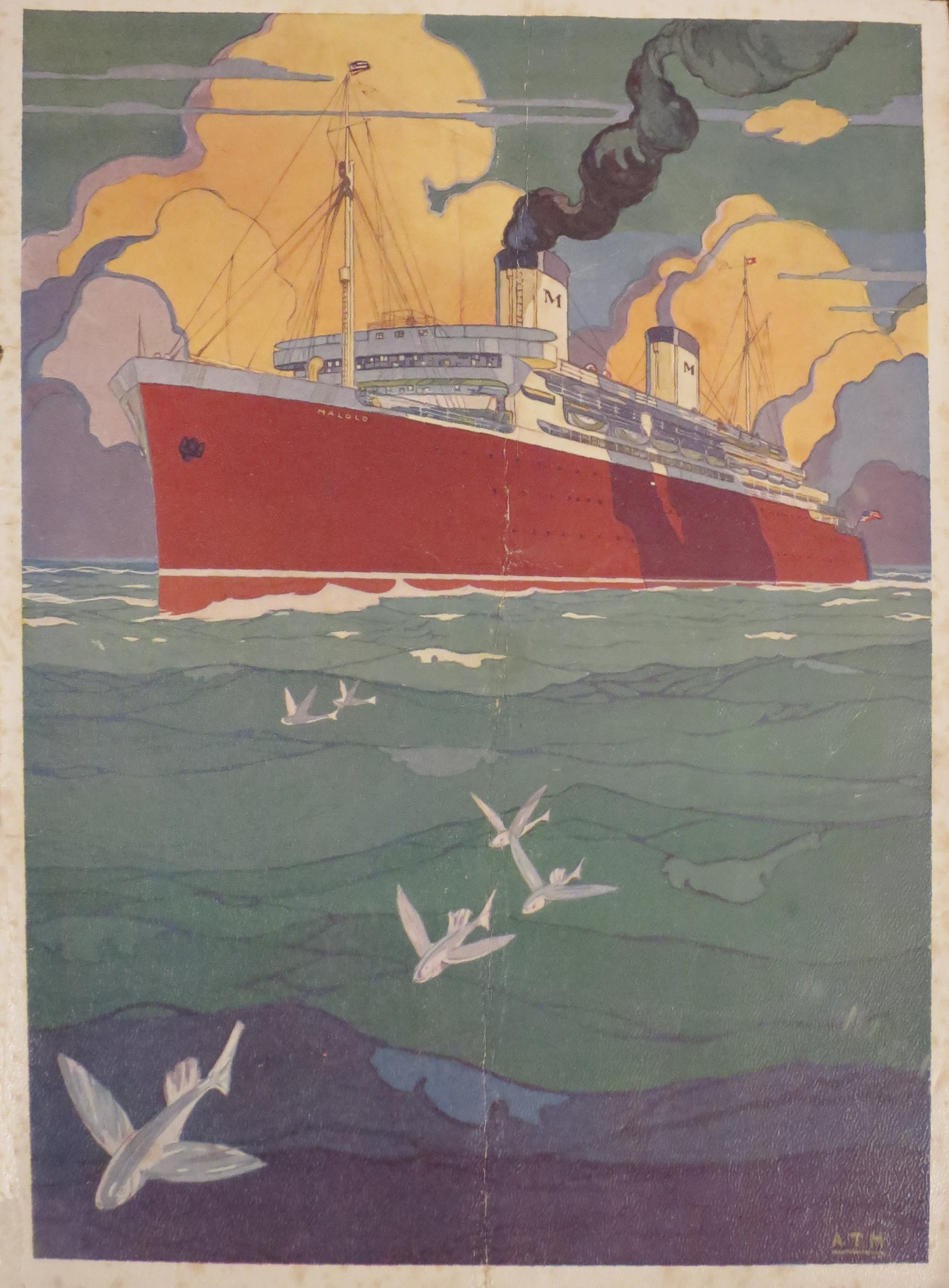
Cover of banquet menu for SS Malolo by Arman Manookian (1927)

The Gibbs designed a series of four trim white-hulled ocean liners for the Matson Lines service to Hawaii, starting with the design of SS Malolo in 1924. Malolo was built at William Cramp & Sons under the Gibbs Brothers' exacting supervision and tolerances. At the time she was launched, Malolo was the largest and fastest passenger liner built in the United States. During sea trials in May 1927, Malolo was rammed by SS Jacob Christensen; the Gibbs brothers' modern design and safety features were credited with keeping the disabled ship afloat while she was towed back to the yard. Three sister ships to Malolo would be built in the 1930s: SS Monterey and SS Mariposa in 1931 and SS Lurline in 1932.

The Grace Line contracted with Gibbs & Cox for four smaller 9,000-ton ocean liners in 1930, receiving the SS Santa Rosa, Santa Paula, Santa Lucia, and Santa Elena in 1932. Gibbs & Cox also designed the SS America for the United States Lines, which was completed in 1940. All nine of these ships served as U.S. troopships in the war.

During the war, Gibbs & Cox created plans for thousands of American warships and cargo vessels, including destroyers, LST landing craft, minesweepers, tankers, cruisers, and Liberty ships. Between 1940 through 1946, 63 percent of all merchant ships of 2,000 tons up and 74 percent of all American naval vessels (destroyers, landing craft, escort carriers, etc.) were built to the designs or working plans of Gibbs & Cox.

After the war, the Gibbs brothers were among the promoters for the US government and military to subsidize the construction and operation of a new 1,000-foot (300 m) ocean liner. After overcoming resistance in the Truman administration for government involvement and competing designs, Gibbs & Cox was awarded the contract to design and supervise the construction of the SS United States. This ship was the culmination of Gibbs career, and he was fastidious in the incorporation of fire safety concepts, to the point that the United States surpassed most present day passenger ships in fire prevention and containment. The design was also revolutionary in the use of lightweight materials and construction techniques, including a welded hull and aluminum superstructure. While rivaling the largest liners for physical size, she was much lighter, enabling higher speeds.

The United States entered service in 1952, after five years of design and 28 months of construction. On her maiden voyage, she won the Blue Riband as the fastest ship to cross the Atlantic Ocean, averaging 35.59 knots (65.91 km/h; 40.96 mph), and reducing the crossing time by 10 hours. Between 1952 and 1969, the ship carried a total of 1,025,691 passengers, and completed 800 transatlantic crossings (400 round trips), steaming a total of 2,772,840 nautical miles (5,135,300 km; 3,190,930 mi), and maintained an excellent safety record. She was the largest liner ever built in the United States and the fastest liner built anywhere. While fast and safe, she was panned by some passengers, as the use of exclusively fireproof materials in the décor and furnishings limited the aesthetic and luxury appeal.

In remarks accepting the Franklin Medal for his work in designing the United States, after recounting the ship's many achievements and the efforts of so many in making those achievements possible, Gibbs stated "My sole contribution in this performance is the fact that I took the responsibility for failure."

== Later years ==
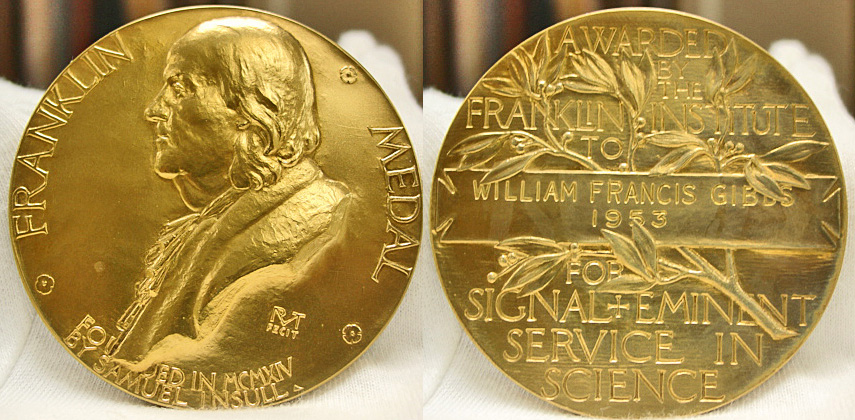
Gibbs's Franklin Medal in the collection at The Mariners Museum

In 1953, Gibbs was awarded the Franklin Institute's Franklin Medal. In 1955 he was awarded the first Elmer A. Sperry Award. He died in New York City on September 6, 1967, two weeks after his 81st birthday.

Fulton-Gibbs Hall, the marine engineering building at the United States Merchant Marine Academy at Kings Point, New York, is named in honor for Gibbs and Robert Fulton. The Gibbs Brothers Medal, awarded by the United States National Academy of Sciences for outstanding contributions in the field of naval architecture and marine engineering, was established by a gift from Gibbs and his brother.
