= Kanaloa (disambiguation) =

Kanaloa is a god in Hawaiian mythology symbolized by the squid or by the octopus

Kanaloa may refer to:

- Kanaloa manoa, a species of crustacean in the family Exoedicerotidae, the only species in the animal genus Kanoloa
- Kanaloa kahoolawensis, a species of plant in the family Fabaceae, the only species in the plant genus Kanoloa
- Kanaloa-class freighter, a cargo ship design
