= SS Lurline (1932) =

American ocean liner built in 1932

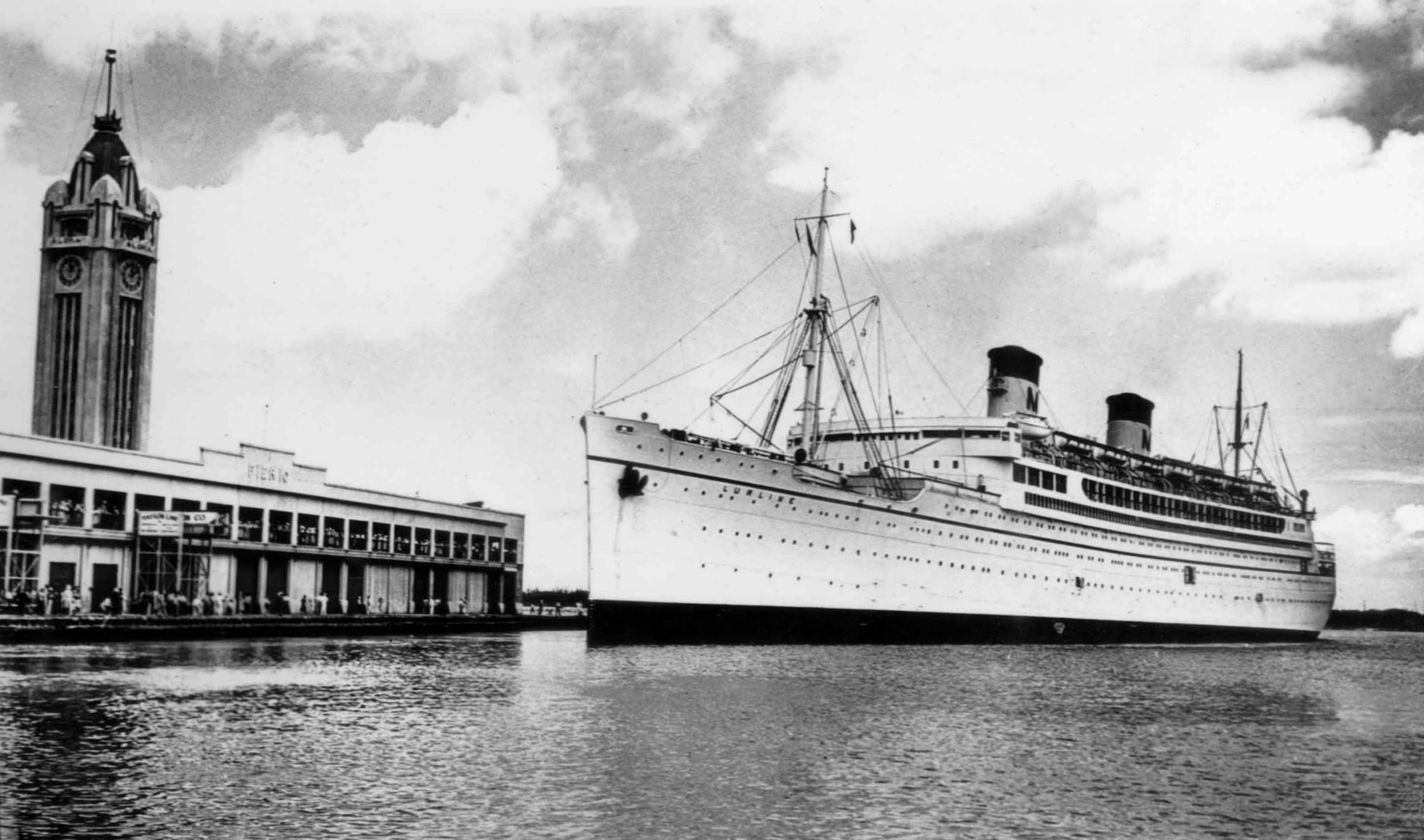
- SS Lurline at Honolulu in the 1930s.

History

United States
- Name: Lurline
- Namesake: Lurline Matson Roth
- Owner: Matson Lines; Chandris Lines
- Builder: Bethlehem Shipbuilding Corporation, Fore River Shipyard
- Laid down: 1931
- Launched: 18 July 1932
- Christened: Lurline, 12 July 1932; Ellinis, September 1963
- Maiden voyage: 12 January 1933
- In service: 1933
- Out of service: 1981
- Identification: IMO number: 5423790
- Fate: Scrapped in Taiwan in 1987.

General characteristics
- Type: Ocean liner
- Tonnage: 18,163 GRT
- Length: 632 ft (193 m)
- Beam: 79 ft (24 m)
- Decks: 5
- Speed: 19 knots (35 km/h; 22 mph) (service); 22 knots (41 km/h; 25 mph) (maximum)
- Capacity: 715 passengers (475 first class, 240 tourist class)
- Crew: 359

SS Lurline was the third Matson Lines vessel to hold that name and the last of four fast and luxurious ocean liners that Matson built for the Hawaii and Australasia runs from the West Coast of the United States. Lurline's fleet mates were SS Malolo, SS Mariposa and SS Monterey. Lurline served as a troopship in World War II operated by War Shipping Administration agents serving Army troop transport requirements. Bought by the Chandris Lines in 1963 as the RHMS Ellinis the ship became one of the most important luxury cruise ships on the Australian and New Zealand services. She operated in Australasia and Oceania until 1980.

== History ==
=== As Lurline (1932) ===
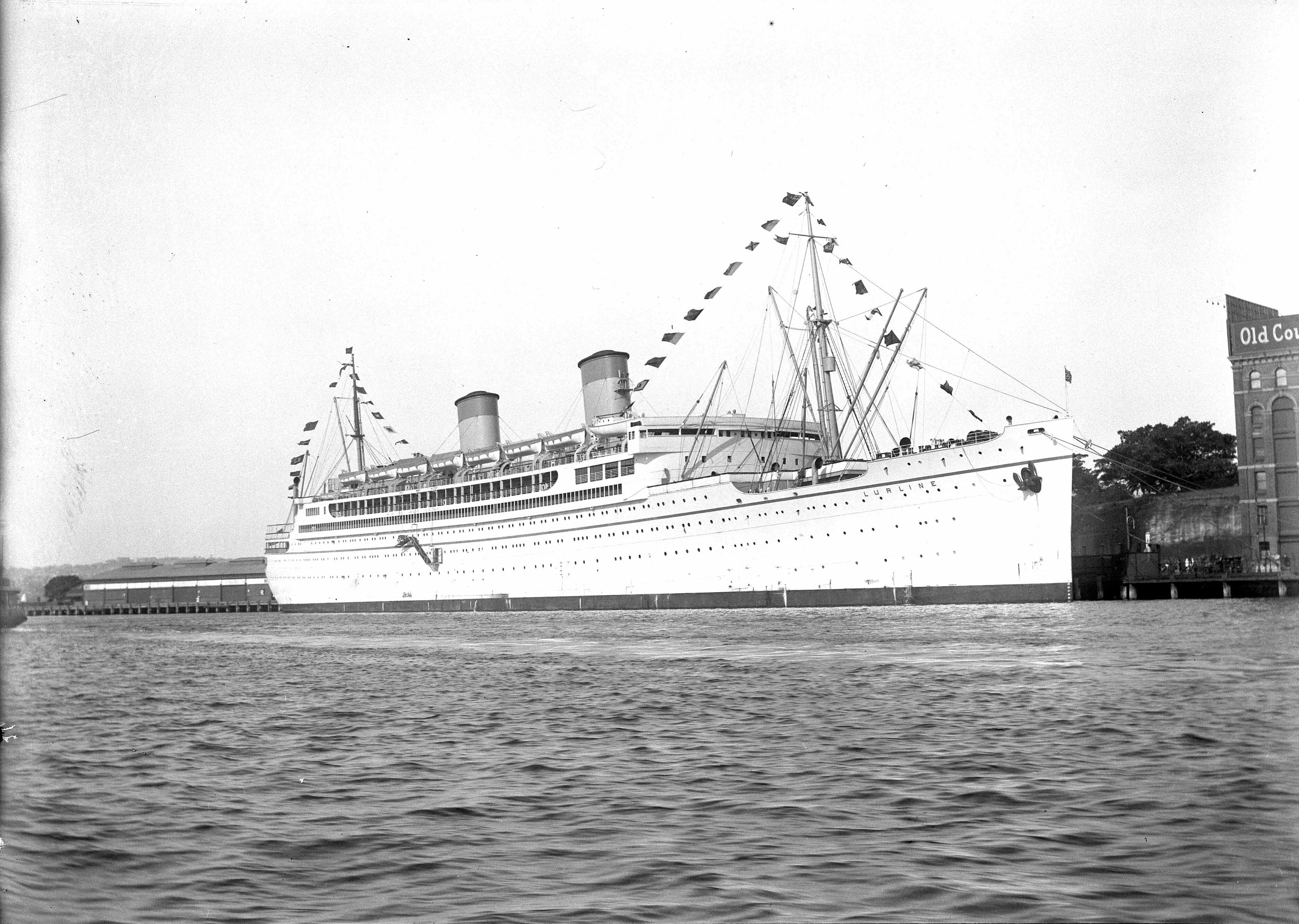
Lurline at Sydney in 1933.

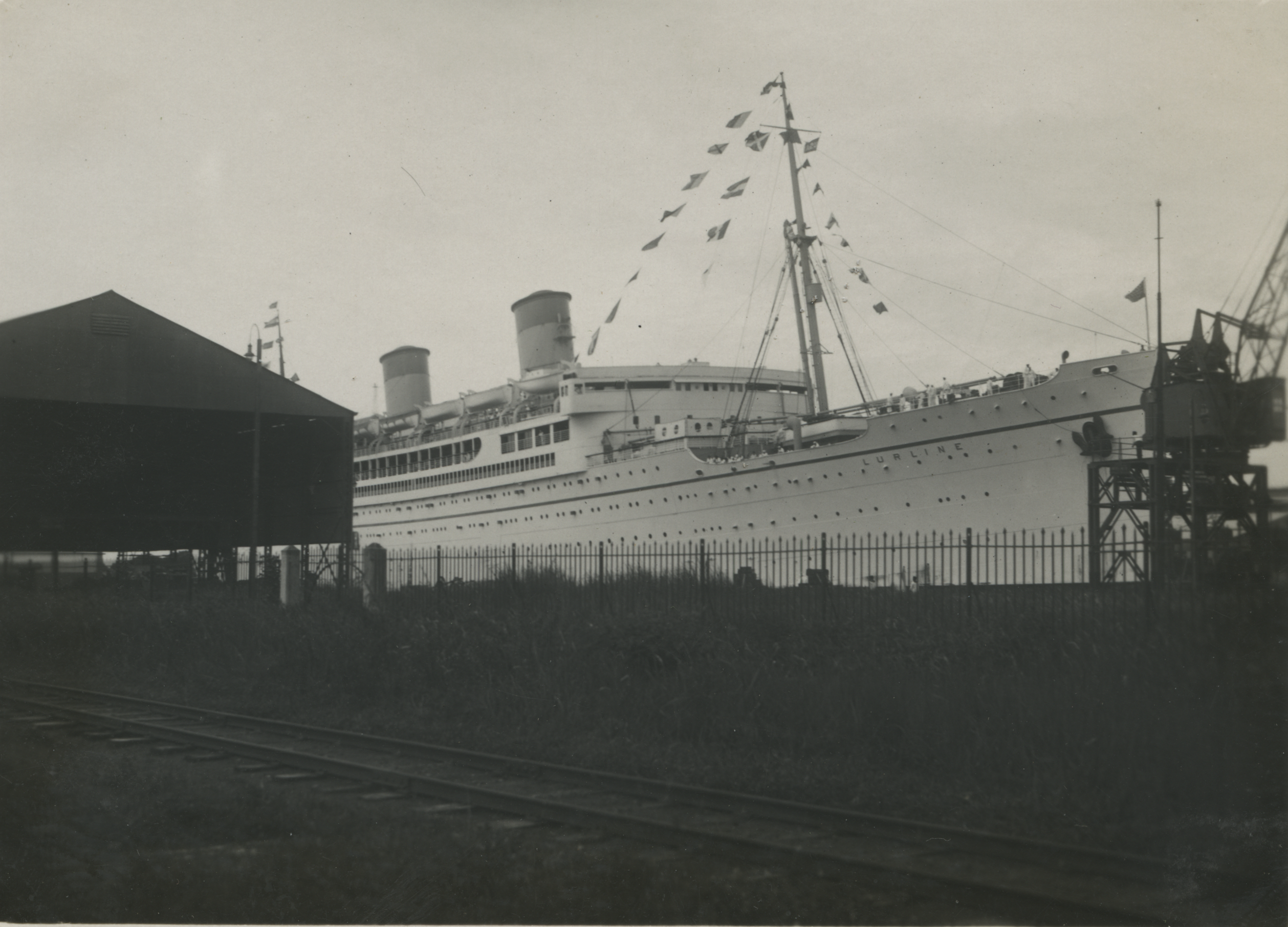
Lurline at the Dutch East Indies.

SS Lurline was christened on 12 July 1932 in Quincy, Massachusetts, by Lurline Matson Roth for the Matson Lines' Pacific services; Roth, the daughter of the Matson Lines' founder, previously had christened a namesake 1908 steamship Lurline as a young woman of 18. Contrary to popular belief, Lurline’s design was not entrusted to William Francis Gibbs. Instead, naval architect Hugo P. Frear and marine engineer John F. Metten were responsible for designing Lurline and her sister ships Mariposa and Monterey. On 12 January 1933, Lurline left New York City bound for San Francisco via the Panama Canal on her maiden voyage, thence to Sydney and the South Seas, returning to San Francisco on 24 April 1933. She then served on the express San Francisco to Honolulu service with her running mate Malolo.

Aviator Amelia Earhart was carried by Lurline from Los Angeles to Honolulu with her Lockheed Vega airplane secured on deck during December 22–27, 1934. The voyage prepared her for the record-breaking Honolulu-to-Oakland solo flight she made in January 1935.

Lurline was halfway from Honolulu to San Francisco on 7 December 1941, carrying a record load of 765 passengers, when the Japanese bombed Pearl Harbor. The ship's alleged reception of radio signals from the Japanese fleet became part of the Pearl Harbor advance-knowledge conspiracy theory. She arrived safely on December 10, travelling in a zigzag path under radio silence and blacked out at night, and soon returned to Hawaii with her Matson sisters Mariposa and Monterey in a convoy laden with troops and supplies.

On 30 April 1942, the SS Lurline, along with a convoy of seven Matson Line ships including USS Hugh L. Scott, boarded the 32nd Infantry Division at Pier 42 in San Francisco. The convoy (SF 43) was escorted by the cruiser USS Indianapolis and two corvettes. Four days out of San Francisco, the Lurline ship's crew discovered the division's mascot, a dog named Vicksburg. She was named for the town in which she was born and the location of the final major campaign of the American Civil War. Vicksburg was killed in a road accident in Southport, Australia on 8 October 1942.

Taking a southerly route to avoid the Japanese Navy, the ship stopped at Wellington and then Auckland, New Zealand. The ship departed Auckland and entered a zone where two freighters had been sunk by Japanese submarines in recent days. The soldiers stayed fully dressed and wide eyed for the two days to Sydney.

They arrived in southern Australia at Port Adelaide on 14 May 1942, having traveled 9,000 miles (14,000 km) in 23 days.

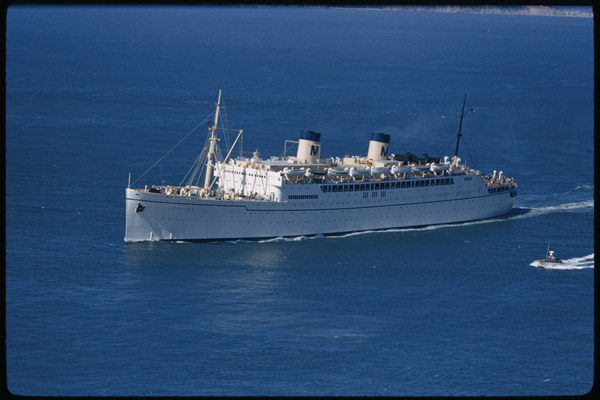
Lurline outbound through the Golden Gate in 1955.

She spent the remainder of the war providing similar services, often voyaging to Australia, and once transported Australian Prime Minister John Curtin to America to confer with President Roosevelt. Wartime events put Lurline at risk. Royal Australian Air Force trainee pilot Arthur Harrison had been put on watch without adequate training. "A straight line of bubbles extending from away out on the starboard side of the ship to across the bow. I had never seen anything quite like it, but it reminded me of bubbles behind a motorboat. I called to the lad on watch on the next gun forward. A few seconds later the ship went into a hard 90° turn to port. We RAAF trainees received a severe reprimand from the captain for not reporting the torpedo. Anyway, it was a bad miss."

Lurline was returned to Matson Lines in mid-1946 and extensively refitted at Bethlehem-Alameda Shipyard in Alameda, California, in 1947 at a cost exceeding US$18 million, with accommodations designed by Raymond Loewy for 484 first-class and 238 cabin-class passengers, served by a crew of 444. She resumed her San Francisco–Los Angeles–Honolulu service from 15 April 1948, calling at Los Angeles on April 16 and arriving at Honolulu on April 21.

Her high occupancy rates during the early 1950s caused Matson to also refit her sister ship Monterey (renaming her SS Matsonia) and the two liners provided a first-class-only service between Hawaii and the American mainland from June 1957 to September 1962, mixed with the occasional Pacific cruise. Serious competition from jet airliners caused passenger loads to fall in the early 1960s and Matsonia was laid up in late 1962.

Only a few months later, Lurline arrived in Los Angeles with serious damage to her port turbine engine, and was laid up, with the necessary repairs deemed too expensive. Matson instead brought the mothballed Matsonia out of retirement, and characteristically, changed her name to Lurline. The original Lurline was offered for sale shortly after.

=== As Ellinis of the Chandris Line ===
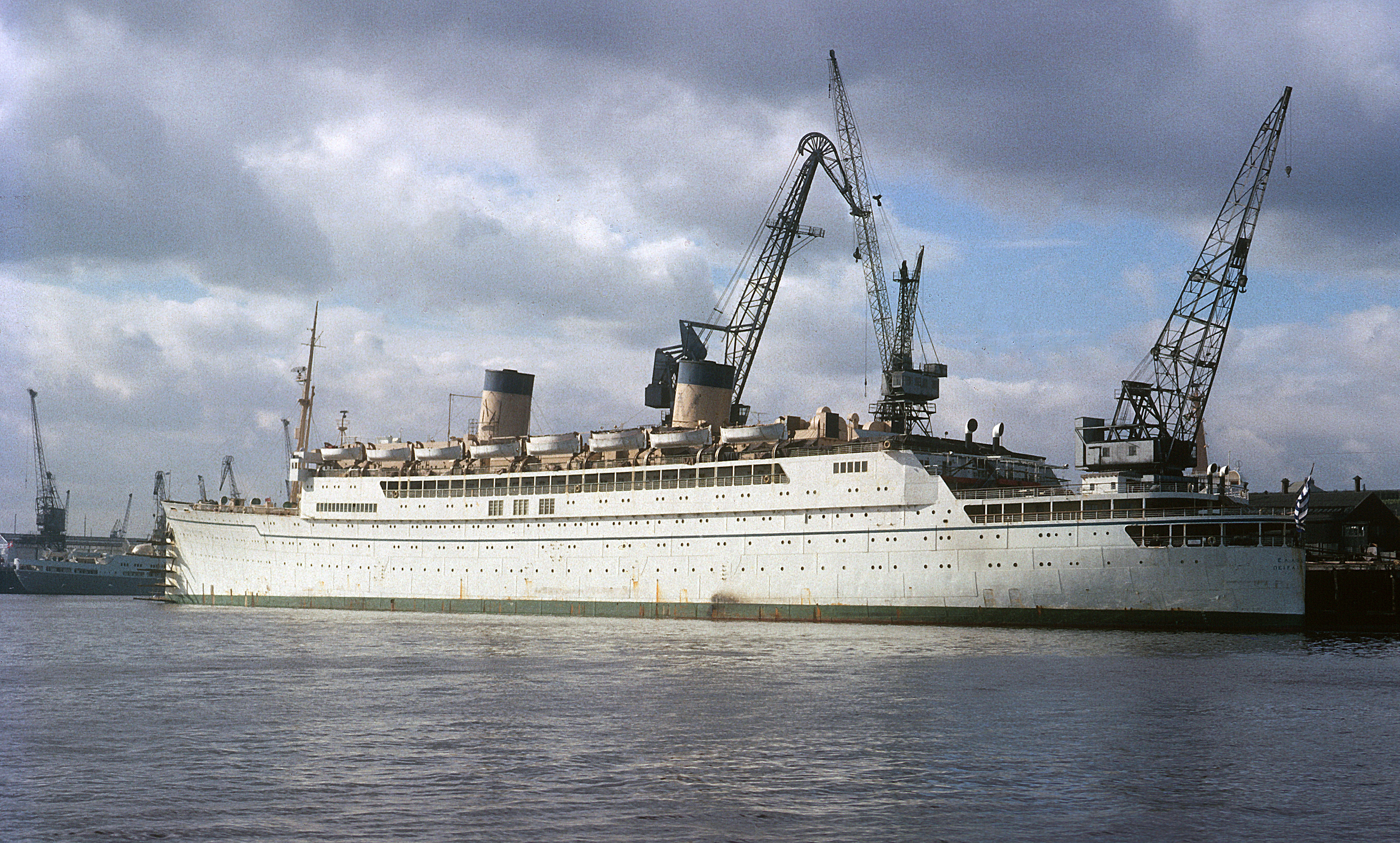
Ellinis being refitted at the shipyard of Swan Hunter of Newcastle in 1963.

Lurline was bought by Chandris Lines in September 1963 to replace SS Brittany, destroyed by fire earlier the same year. Ellinis sailed under her new name from California to North East England to be repaired and refitted at North Shields, increasing accommodation for 1,668 passengers in one class.

In addition to repairs to the damaged turbine, the ship received new Chandris livery and a modernised superstructure with new, streamlined funnels, embarking on her maiden voyage from Piraeus to Sydney on 30 December 1963. Her homeward voyages were alternately routed east via the Panama Canal to Southampton. The ship also took occasional cruises.

In April 1974, while on a cruise to Japan, Ellinis again developed major problems in one of her turbines. Fortunately, Chandris was able to buy a surplus unit from her sister ship Homeric (ex-Mariposa), which was being broken up in Taiwan at the time. The replacement was carried out in Rotterdam, completed in March 1975.

Ellinis provided mainly cruise services from 1975, and in October 1981, she was finally laid up in Greece after providing passenger services for nearly fifty years. Despite various proposals to use the ship whole, she was sold in 1986 and scrapped in Taiwan in 1987. Some of her fittings were installed in other Chandris ships; some engine components were kept in storage in case of future need by her aging sister Britanis (ex-Monterey).

Ellinis's radio callsign was SWXX and two of her known QSS ("working frequencies") were 8343 and 12508 kHz.

== Other ships named Lurline of the Matson Line ==
=== Lurline (1887) ===
William Matson had first come to appreciate the name in the 1870s while serving as skipper aboard the Claus Spreckels family yacht Lurline (a poetic variation of Lorelei, the Rhine River siren) out of San Francisco Bay. Matson met his future wife, Lillie Low, on a yacht voyage he captained to Hawaii; the couple named their daughter Lurline Berenice Matson. Spreckels sold a 150-foot brigantine named Lurline to Matson so Matson could replace his smaller schooner Emma Claudina and double the shipping operation, which involved hauling supplies and a few passengers to Hawaii and returning with cargos of Spreckels sugar. Matson added other vessels to his nascent fleet and the brigantine was sold to another company in 1896.

=== Lurline (1908) ===
Matson built a steamship named Lurline in 1908; one which carried mainly freight, yet could hold 51 passengers along with 65 crew. This steamer served Matson for 20 years, including a stint with United States Shipping Board during World War I. Matson died in 1917; his company continued under a board of directors.

Lurline Matson married William P. Roth in 1914; in 1927, Roth became president of Matson Lines. That same year had SS Malolo (Hawaiian for "flying fish") enter service inaugurating a higher class of tourist travel to Hawaii. In 1928, Roth sold the old steamship Lurline to the Alaska Packers' Association. That ship served various duties including immigration and freight under the Yugoslavian flag (renamed Radnik) and was finally broken up in 1953.

=== Lurline (1963, ex-Matsonia, ex-Monterey) ===
The sister liner originally christened SS Monterey (1931) first was renamed Matsonia (1956) and then Lurline (1963), replacing her sister ships of the same names for the Matson Line as they were retired from service. Lurline (1963) was eventually sold to Chandris Lines in 1970 and was renamed Britanis, where she served Caribbean routes until 1994; after a brief stint as a floating barracks in Guantanamo Bay, Cuba, she was sold again in 1998 and renamed Belofin-1. While under tow en route to a scrapyard in India, she capsized and sank in 2000 off the coast of South Africa.

== In popular culture ==
Joan Didion mentions Lurline in several of the essays included in her books Slouching Towards Bethlehem (1968) and The White Album (1979), in which she discusses Hawaii's place in the popular imagination of Californians like herself and her family. The ship is also referenced in her 1963 debut novel Run, River and her 1984 novel Democracy, which is partly set in Honolulu.

In 1973, David Bowie wrote his song "Aladdin Sane" from his album of the same name whilst on board. This can be seen by the annotation in the vinyl pressings of the album.

In 1973, Brendan Perry, then a teenager and later a founding member of Dead Can Dance, emigrated with his family from England to New Zealand aboard Ellinis. Perry later recalled buying his first acoustic guitar before the six-week voyage from Southampton to Auckland, intending to learn to play during the crossing.

== See also ==
- SS Manoa (1913)
