= SS Manoa =

American freighter steamship, 1913–1969

- Manoa in 1928

History

United States
- Name: Manoa
- Owner: Matson Navigation Company
- Port of registry: San Francisco, later Vladivostok
- Builder: Newport News Shipbuilding
- Launched: November 1, 1913
- Completed: December 13, 1913
- Maiden voyage: March 1, 1914
- Out of service: 1969
- Renamed: Balkhash (1942)
- Identification: US official number 211832
- Fate: Scrapped in Vladivostok, USSR (1975); possibly repair base afterward

General characteristics
- Tonnage: 6,805 GRT (1913)
- Length: 446.2 ft (136.0 m) overall; 422.6 ft (128.8 m) registered
- Beam: 54.0 ft (16.5 m)
- Depth: 33.3 ft (10.1 m)
- Decks: Bridge (officer's quarters), Promenade (10 deluxe passenger cabins), Main (20 passenger cabins)
- Propulsion: Steam quadruple expansion, reciprocating steam engine, single screw
- Capacity: 90 passengers

SS Manoa was an American freight and passenger steamship that sailed for the Matson Line from San Francisco to Hawaii. Unusual for her time, her engines and funnel were aft, minimizing vibration felt by the passengers and soot on deck. The aft design was considered ugly by passenger ship purists.

After the Attack on Pearl Harbor in 1941, she was put into military service and transferred to the Soviet Union under terms of Lend-Lease. They renamed her Balkhash. She was used to transfer Estonian prisoners to the Gulag during World War II and later transferred to the Far East Company. She remained in service through at least 1967, and her hull was used for a while afterward as a service vessel for repairing navigation systems. She was reportedly scrapped in 1975, though she may have been used for many years more.

== Pacific service ==
The ship was built by Newport News Shipbuilding and launched on November 1, 1913. She arrived in Honolulu on March 24, 1914, on her maiden voyage. Her bridge deck held the officer's quarters, the promenade deck 10 deluxe passenger cabins, and the main deck 20 passenger cabins. One-way fares in 1920 were $350–$500 for a cabin on the promenade deck with a private bathroom, $90 to $100.00 for a cabin on the promenade deck without a private bathroom, and $90 for a cabin on the main deck.

She carried about 90 passengers and seven officers on week-long trips from Pier 32 in San Francisco to Honolulu, Hawaii, and thence to Kahului, Maui, before returning to Honolulu. The Manoa served this route from 1913 to 1942. Passengers could transfer to other Matson ships for passage to the South Pacific Islands. In 1926, the ship served as a waymarker for the Dole Air Derby air race from the Oakland, California to Wheeler Field in Honolulu, Hawaii.

== Transfer to Soviet Union ==
After the attack on Pearl Harbor, she, along with the other Matson passenger ships SS Lurline (1932), Matsonia, Mariposa and Monterey, and 33 Matson freighters, were pressed into military service by the United States Maritime Commission. The U.S. transferred the Manoa to the Soviet Union in 1943 as part of the Lend-Lease Program. They renamed her Balkhash (Soviet registration M-11744), replacing a ship of the same name that had been sunk by the German air force during the Soviet evacuation of Tallinn. She was used at least twice by the Soviets during World War II to transport Estonian prisoners to the Gulag.

The ship was modernized in 1956 in Chinese shipyards and restored to her original configuration carrying both cargo and passengers. She was transferred on June 22, 1964, to the Far Eastern Shipping Company, and two years later on December 13, 1966, she was decommissioned. She was used for the next few years as a floating base to repair navigation equipment for the Vladivostok merchant fleet. The ship's name was removed from the Russian Maritime Register of Shipping in 1967, and was reported to have been scrapped in Vladivostok in 1975, although other reports state her hull may have been used through 1985 and perhaps later.
