= Love at First Flight =

Love at First Flight may refer to:

- Love at First Flight, 1943 novel by Charles F. Spalding and Otis Carney
- "Love at First Flight", a 2002 episode of the cartoon series Time Squad

== See also ==
- Love at First Fight
