= Queen Frederica =

Queen Frederica or Queen Frederika may refer to:

- Frederica Louisa of Hesse-Darmstadt (1751–1805), Queen of Prussia
- Frederica of Mecklenburg-Strelitz (1778–1841), Queen of Hanover
- Frederica of Baden (1781–1826), Queen of Sweden
- Frederica of Hanover (1917–1981), Queen of the Hellenes
- SS Queen Frederica, a Chandris Line cruise ship
