= Aloha-class freighter =

Cargo ship class

Class overview
- Name: Aloha-class freighter
- Builders: Philly Shipyard
- Operators: Matson, Inc.
- Cost: US$209,000,000 per ship
- Built: 2013-
- In service: 2018-
- In commission: 2018-
- Planned: 5
- Building: 3
- Completed: 2
- Active: 2

General characteristics
- Class & type: Cargo ship
- Tonnage: 50,794 DWT
- Length: 854 ft 0 in (260.30 m)
- Installed power: 2 Hyundai 6H27DF 2 Cummins QSK19
- Propulsion: LNG powered engines 1 MAN 7S90ME
- Speed: 23 knots (43 km/h; 26 mph)

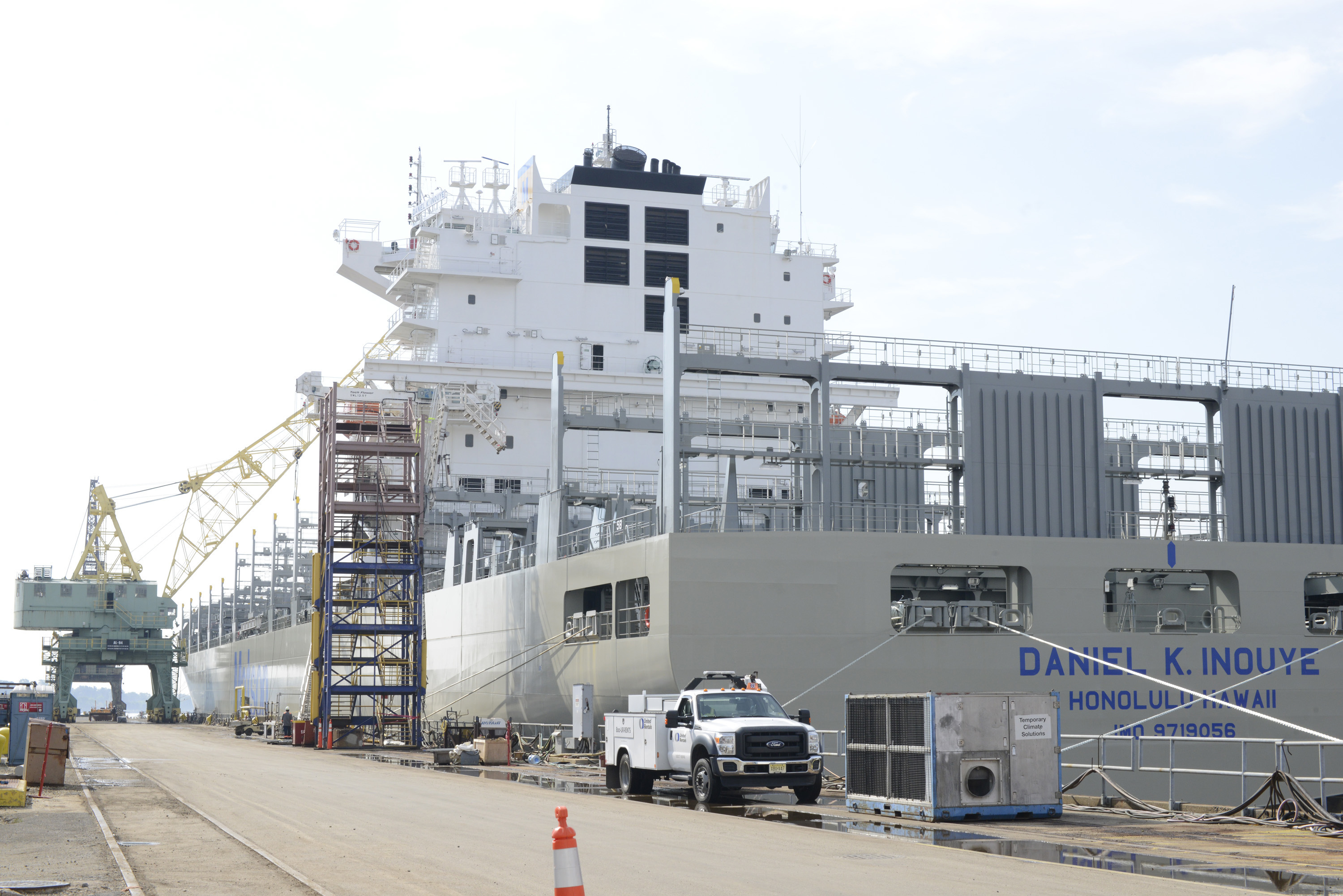
The Daniel K. Inouye, an 850-foot container ship being constructed in Philadelphia Shipyards, is the largest container vessel constructed in the United States

The Aloha class is a pair of cargo ships built by Philly Shipyard for Matson. The vessels are the largest of their type to be built in the United States.

Matson placed the $418 million order for the two ships in November 2013. In October 2015, the ceremonial first steel cutting took place, with both ships to be built roughly in parallel until their deliveries in late 2018. The first vessel, Daniel K. Inouye, was christened on 30 June 2018, though outfitting work continued until late in the year. She was delivered on 1 November, and made her first voyage to Hawaii later in the month. The second ship, Kaimana Hila, was christened on 9 March 2019, and entered service in August. Matson operates both ships from continental United States ports to Hawaii and Guam.

At 854 feet (260 m) in length, and with a deadweight tonnage of 50,794 DWT, Aloha-class ships are the largest container ships ever built in the United States. Each ship has a cargo capacity of 3,600 TEUs and is powered by a dual fuel engine, burning either diesel fuel or liquefied natural gas, that gives a service speed of about 23 knots (26 mph).
