= Lurline Matson Roth =

American heiress, equestrian and philanthropist

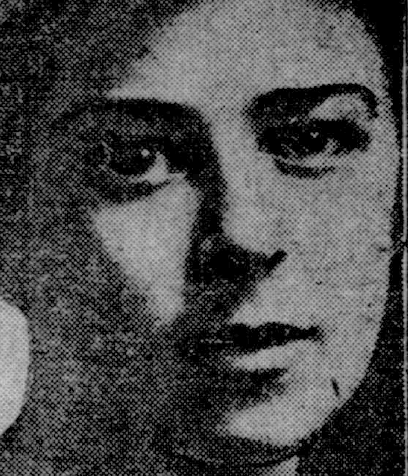
- Photograph published in San Francisco Call, August 17, 1913
- Born: September 3, 1890; San Francisco, California
- Died: September 4, 1985 (aged 95); Burlingame, California
- Education: Miss Hamlin's
- Spouse: William P. Roth
- Children: William M. Roth; Lurline Coonan; Berenice Roth Spalding
- Parent(s): William Matson; Lillie Berenice Low
- Relatives: Charles F. Spalding (son-in-law)

Lurline Matson Roth (1890–1985) was an American heiress, equestrian and philanthropist from San Francisco, California. She competed in horse shows in the United States, and bred award-winning horses. She donated her estate, Filoli, to the National Trust for Historic Preservation.

== Early life ==
Born Lurline Berenice Matson on September 3, 1890, in San Francisco, California. She was named Lurline after sugar magnate Claus Spreckels's yacht. Her father, William Matson, was the Swedish-American founder of Matson, Inc., a shipping corporation. As such she was an heiress to the Matson fortune. Her mother was Lillie Berenice (Low) Matson (1864–1930). She had two older brothers, Walter Joseph (1877–1926) and Theodore William Matson (1883–1936). The family wintered in a rented house in San Francisco and summered in a house near Mills College.

She was educated at Miss Hamlin's, a private all-girl school in San Francisco, where she studied music and art.

== Equestrian ==
She competed in horse shows every year and won national medals.

In 1924, her mother purchased the Why Worry Farm in Woodside for Lurline, where she bred horses. She owned a five-gaited horse, a three-gaited horse, a Standardbred road horse, a Hackney horse, a Hackney pony and a jumper and hired a trainer, thus turning it into a show stable. After she stopped competing, her horses won many equestrian awards. Two of her best-known American Saddlebred horses were Chief of Longview (born at Longview Farm in Lee's Summit, Missouri) and Sweetheart on Parade.

== Philanthropy ==
During World War II, she volunteered for the American Red Cross. A decade later, in 1964, she and her son renovated Ghirardelli Square in San Francisco. The renovation cost US$10 million.

In 1975, she donated her Filoli estate to the National Trust for Historic Preservation.

== Personal life ==
She met William Philip Roth (1879–1963), a stockbroker from Honolulu, in 1913. Even though her father was opposed to their relationship, they got married a year later in San Francisco, on May 27, 1914. They had a son, William M. Roth, in 1916, and identical twin daughters, Lurline Roth Coonan and Berenice Roth Spalding, in 1920.

They resided at Why Worry Farm with Lurline's mother, and they had another estate in Hawaii. In 1937, they purchased Filoli, an estate in Woodside, California, from heir William Bowers Bourn II. They often entertained guests at Filoli, including the pianist Ignace Paderewski and the aviator Amelia Earhart, who took Lurline on a plane ride in 1937.

After her husband died in 1963, she lived by herself at Filoli. One of her daughters, Berenice, married Charles F. Spalding, an advisor to John F. Kennedy, television screenwriter, investment banker and heir to the Cudahy Packing fortune.

== Death ==
She died on Wednesday, September 4, 1985, in Burlingame, California. She was ninety-five years old.
