= Charles F. Spalding =

American screenwriter

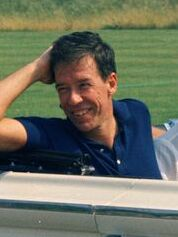
- Spalding in 1961
- Born: April 12, 1918; Lake Forest, Illinois, US
- Died: December 29, 1999 (aged 81); Hillsborough, California, US
- Education: The Hill School; Yale University
- Occupations: Television writer, investment banker
- Spouses: Elizabeth Coxe; Amy Ann McGinnis Sullivan; Berenice Roth
- Children: 6
- Relatives: Patrick Cudahy (maternal grandfather); Lurline Matson Roth (mother-in-law)

For the Scottish confectioner and engineer, see Charles Spalding.

Charles F. Spalding (1918–1999) was an American heir, political advisor, television screenwriter and investment banker. He was a political campaigner during the presidential campaigns of John F. Kennedy and Robert F. Kennedy, a best-selling co-author of Love At First Flight, a screenwriter for Charlie Chaplin, and later vice president of the New York City-based investment bank Lazard.

== Biography ==
=== Early life ===
Charles F. Spalding was born in 1918 in Lake Forest, Illinois. His maternal grandfather, Patrick Cudahy, was the founder of Cudahy Packing Company, the third largest meat-packing company in the United States. He was thus an heir to the Cudahy Packing fortune.

He was educated at The Hill School, a private boarding school in Pottstown, Pennsylvania. He went on to graduate from Yale University in New Haven, Connecticut in 1941, where he was a weekly contributor to the Yale Daily News, the campus newspaper. The weekly column was called 'Ain't Necessarily So'. During the Second World War, he served in the United States Navy.

=== Career ===
After he was introduced to John F. Kennedy by his Yale roommate, they became friends and he worked on the presidential campaign of John F. Kennedy in Illinois and West Virginia. He was an usher at Kennedy's wedding. The two friends often traveled together, sometimes flying on Air Force One. Spalding also worked on Robert F. Kennedy's presidential campaign in California.

In 1943, with his friend Otis Carney, he co-wrote a book entitled, Love At First Flight. It became a best-seller. After the rights were purchased by actor Gary Cooper, Spalding moved to Los Angeles, California to work as a scriptwriter for Charlie Chaplin. He then wrote for television, working for J. Walter Thompson. In 1952, he was a production associate of Of Three I See, a Broadway musical.

He founded De Sainte Phalle Spalding, an investment banking firm. Later, he served as Vice President of Lazard in New York City. He retired in the 1980s.

=== Personal life ===
With his first wife, Elizabeth Coxe Spalding, he had three sons, Charles F. Spalding Jr., Gerald C. Spalding, Richard C. Spalding, and three daughters, Elizabeth S. Perry, Josephine Spalding, and Florence C. Spalding. His second wife was Amy Ann Sullivan. He later married heiress and philanthropist Berenice Roth Spalding. She was the granddaughter of William Matson, the founder of the shipping corporation Matson, Inc., and had grown up at Filoli, an estate in Woodside, California. They resided in Hillsborough, San Mateo County, California.

Spalding was a member of the Pacific-Union Club, a gentlemen's club in San Francisco.

=== Death ===
He died of myeloma in 1999 in Hillsborough, California. His funeral took place at St Matthew's Episcopal Church in San Mateo, California.

== Bibliography ==
- Carney, Otis; Spalding, Charles F.. Love At First Flight. 1943.
