= Hanwha Philly Shipyard =

Commercial shipyard in Philadelphia

Coordinates: 39.888301°N 75.187844°W

Hanwha Philly Shipyard, Inc.
- Formerly: Philadelphia Shipyard, Inc.
- Type: Subsidiary
- Industry: Shipyard
- Founded: 1996; 30 years ago
- Headquarters: Philadelphia, Pennsylvania, United States
- Area served: United States
- Key people: David Kim (CEO)
- Number of employees: 2000 (2026)
- Parent: Hanwha Group; (2024–present)
- Website: www.hanwhaphillyshipyard.com

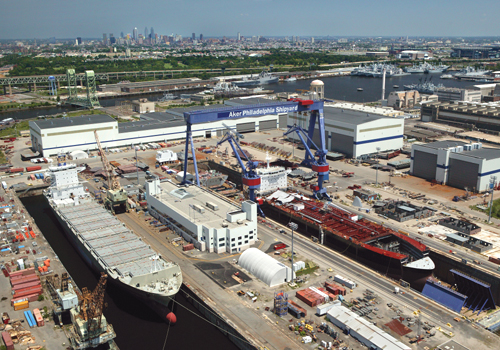
The shipyard

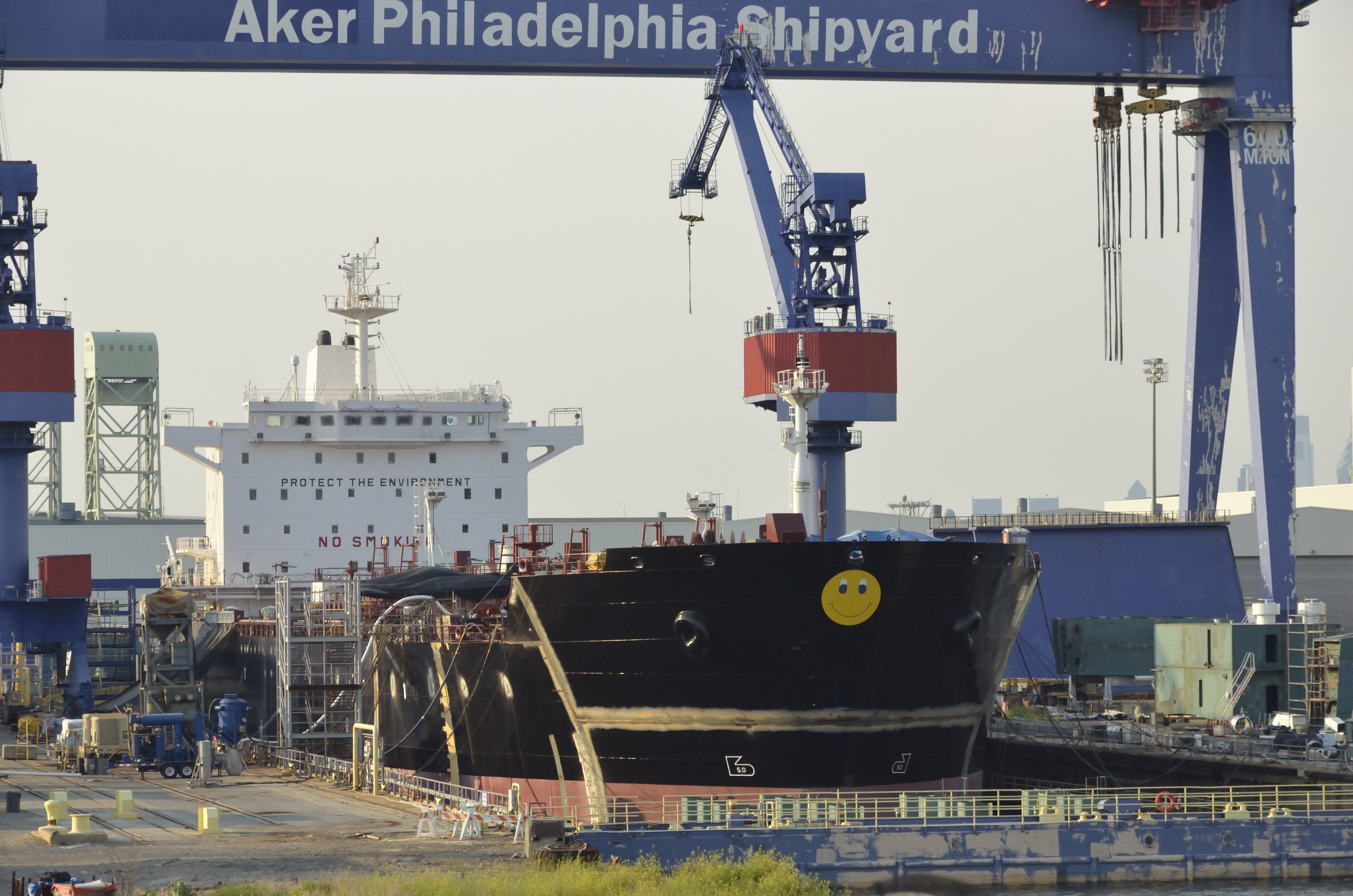
Aker Philadelphia Shipyard

Hanwha Philly Shipyard, formerly Philadelphia Shipyard Inc., is a commercial shipyard located in Philadelphia, Pennsylvania, United States on part of the site of the Philadelphia Naval Shipyard. The commercial yard began after the United States Navy had ended most of its operations at the site.

Until being acquired by the Hanwha Group in December 2024, the yard was a company listed on the Oslo Stock Exchange and was part of the Aker Group controlled by Kjell Inge Røkke. The yard builds Jones Act-compliant ships for domestic shipping, primarily product tankers and container ships.

== History ==
The yard was started as a cooperation between Kværner and the City of Philadelphia, the Commonwealth of Pennsylvania and the Government of the United States. Rebuilt and opened in 2000, the yard delivered its first ship in 2003: MV Manukai, a container cargo ship for Matson Line and the first of three, CV 2600 class sister vessels built for Matson through 2006.

In 2005, control of the yard passed to Aker, which bought the troubled Kværner firm. Aker American Shipping ASA was formed and listed on the Oslo Bors. In 2007, Aker American Shipping was split into two companies - the shipbuilding company, Aker Philadelphia Shipyard, and the ship owning company, Aker American Shipping (today American Shipping Company).

In January 2013, the shipyard completed construction of fourteen product tankers for subsidiaries of American Shipping Company (AMSC), Overseas Shipholding Group (OSG) and Crowley.

On September 29, 2011, Aker Philadelphia signed a contract with SeaRiver Maritime Inc. (the shipping subsidiary of ExxonMobil) for the construction of two Aframax oil product tankers for delivery in 2014. At 820 ft. in length and measuring over 115,000 tons deadweight, they will be the largest ships yet built by the yard.

On August 14, 2013, Philly.com reported that Aker signed a joint business venture with Crowley Maritime Corp of Jacksonville, Florida, to construct eight product tankers with an option for four additional tankers. The venture was valued at $500 million and is expected to continue work at the yard through 2017.

On November 6, 2013, Aker Philadelphia Shipyard announced an agreement to build two container ships, named Aloha class, for Matson, Inc.

On June 10, 2014, the shipyard announced the planned establishment of Philly Tankers, a Jones Act Shipping Company. The shipyard has firm contracts to build two eco-design product tankers and options for two additional new builds.

On June 11, 2014, Aker Philadelphia Shipyard has delivered the first of two aframax tankers to SeaRiver Maritime, Exxon Mobil Corporation's U.S. marine affiliate. This tanker is 820 feet long and designed to transport 800,000 barrels of Alaskan North Slope crude oil from Prince William Sound, Alaska to the U.S. West Coast. Also, this vessel is equipped with double hull protection, the latest navigation and communications equipment, and an energy-efficient engine.

On September 30, 2015, Aker Philadelphia Shipyard delivered the Ohio, the first of four next-generation 50,000 dwt product tankers that it is building for Crowley Maritime Corporation.

On October 1, 2015, the shipyard began production activities on two 3,600 TEU Aloha class containerships that it is building for Matson Navigation Company. The contracts for the vessels were originally signed in 2013 for a total value of $418 million.

On December 1, 2015, at an extraordinary general meeting, shareholders of Aker Philadelphia Shipyard ASA (OSLO: AKPS) approved a proposal to change the company's name to Philly Shipyard ASA. Accordingly, Aker Philadelphia Shipyard, Inc.(APSI), the sole operating subsidiary of AKPS, likewise changed its name to Philly Shipyard.

On December 23, 2015, Philly Shipyard completed the construction of the Texas for Crowley Maritime Corporation. Texas - it's the 22nd vessel built by Philly Shipyard. It's the next generation 50,000 dwt product tanker.

On April 15, 2016, the shipyard delivered the Louisiana. Louisiana - joins sister ships Ohio and Texas, which were received by Crowley in 2015. The 600-foot tanker has a carrying capacity of 14.5 million gallons of crude oil or refined products.

In March 2019 the shipyard delivered a container vessel for the Hawaii trade but had no new vessel orders. In July the yard had only a short-term contract for the refit of a Maritime Administration cargo ship. In a report to their investors, they outlined an effort to pursue the repair and building of US government vessels.

As of August 2022 the shipyard had three National Security Multi-Mission Vessels (NSMV) under construction. Matson placed a $1 billion order for three LNG-fueled Aloha class container ships in November 2022.

On June 20, 2024, South Korean Hanwha Group and its shipbuilding subsidiary Hanwha Ocean have agreed to purchase Philly Shipyard for $100 million pending relevant regulatory approvals. Six months later, it was announced that the acquisition had been completed. As of 2026, about one ship a year is produced at the yard.
