= Kanaloa manoa =

Scientific classification
- Domain: Eukaryota
- Kingdom: Animalia
- Phylum: Arthropoda
- Class: Malacostraca
- Order: Amphipoda
- Family: Exoedicerotidae
- Genus: Kanaloa; J.L. Barnard, 1970
- Species: K. manoa

Binomial name
- Kanaloa manoa J.L. Barnard, 1970

Species of crustacean

Kanaloa manoa is a species of amphipod crustacean, and the only species in the genus Kanaloa.
