= SS Monterey =

American ocean liner built in 1931

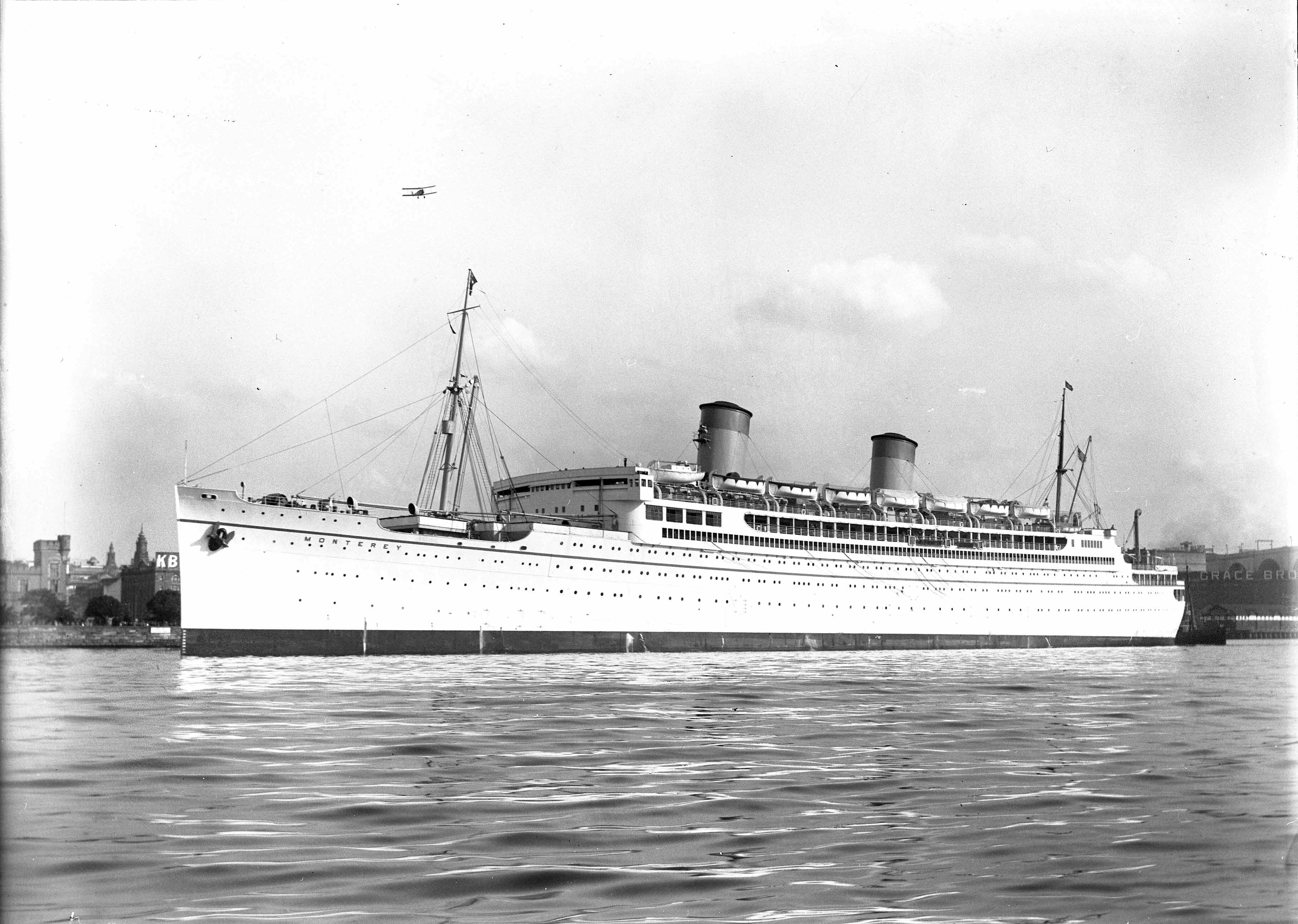
- Monterey departing Circular Quay, 1932

History
- Name: Monterey (1932–1956); Matsonia (1956–1963); Lurline (1963–1970); Britanis (1970–1998); Belofin-1 (1998–2000)
- Owner: Matson Lines (1932–1970); Chandris Lines (1970–1998); AG Belofin Investments (1998–2000)
- Operator: Matson Lines (1932–1970); Chandris Lines (1971–1996)
- Port of registry: (United States) San Francisco (1932–1970); Panama City (1970–2000)
- Builder: Fore River Shipyard, Bethlehem Shipbuilding Corporation
- Launched: 10 October 1931
- Christened: 1932
- Completed: April 1932
- Maiden voyage: 3 June 1932
- In service: 1932 – 1996
- Out of service: 1996
- Identification: IMO number: 5229223; Official Number 231480
- Fate: Sank, 21 October 2000

General characteristics
- Type: Ocean liner
- Tonnage: 18,017 GRT
- Length: 632 ft (193 m)
- Beam: 79 ft (24 m)
- Decks: 5 (1931–1970); 9 (1971–2000)
- Propulsion: 2 × Bethlehem geared steam turbines, 28,450 shp (21,215.16 kW)
- Speed: 22.84 knots (42.30 km/h; 26.28 mph)
- Capacity: 701 passengers (472 first class, 229 cabin class)
- Crew: 360

SS Monterey was a luxury ocean liner launched on 10 October 1931. The ship was completed April 1932 and is shown in registers as a 1932 ship. (Note: The Matson liner, operating as a troopship, is sometimes erroneously seen as USAT Matsonia. A much smaller ship, official number 232021, 5,236 GRT, ex Puerto Rico, ex Hati built by Newport News Shipbuilding, Newport News, Virginia, is also seen in most registers with a 1932 date. This smaller ship was also acquired by WSA on 26 September 1942, allocated to the U.S. Army under bareboat charter and did operate as USAT Monterey. It was this ship that was considered and rejected by Navy as Alameda (AP-68).) Monterey was the third of the four ships of the Matson Lines "White Fleet", which were designed by William Francis Gibbs and also included SS Malolo, SS Mariposa and SS Lurline. The design of Monterey was near-identical to her two sister ships, Mariposa and Lurline, and very similar to Malolo. During World War II Monterey was used as a troopship operated by Matson as agents of the War Shipping Administration (WSA). Monterey was a large, fast transport capable of sailing independently and was allocated to serving Army troop transport requirements. The ship was involved in an attack on a convoy near Cape Bougaroun.

== Career with Matson Lines ==
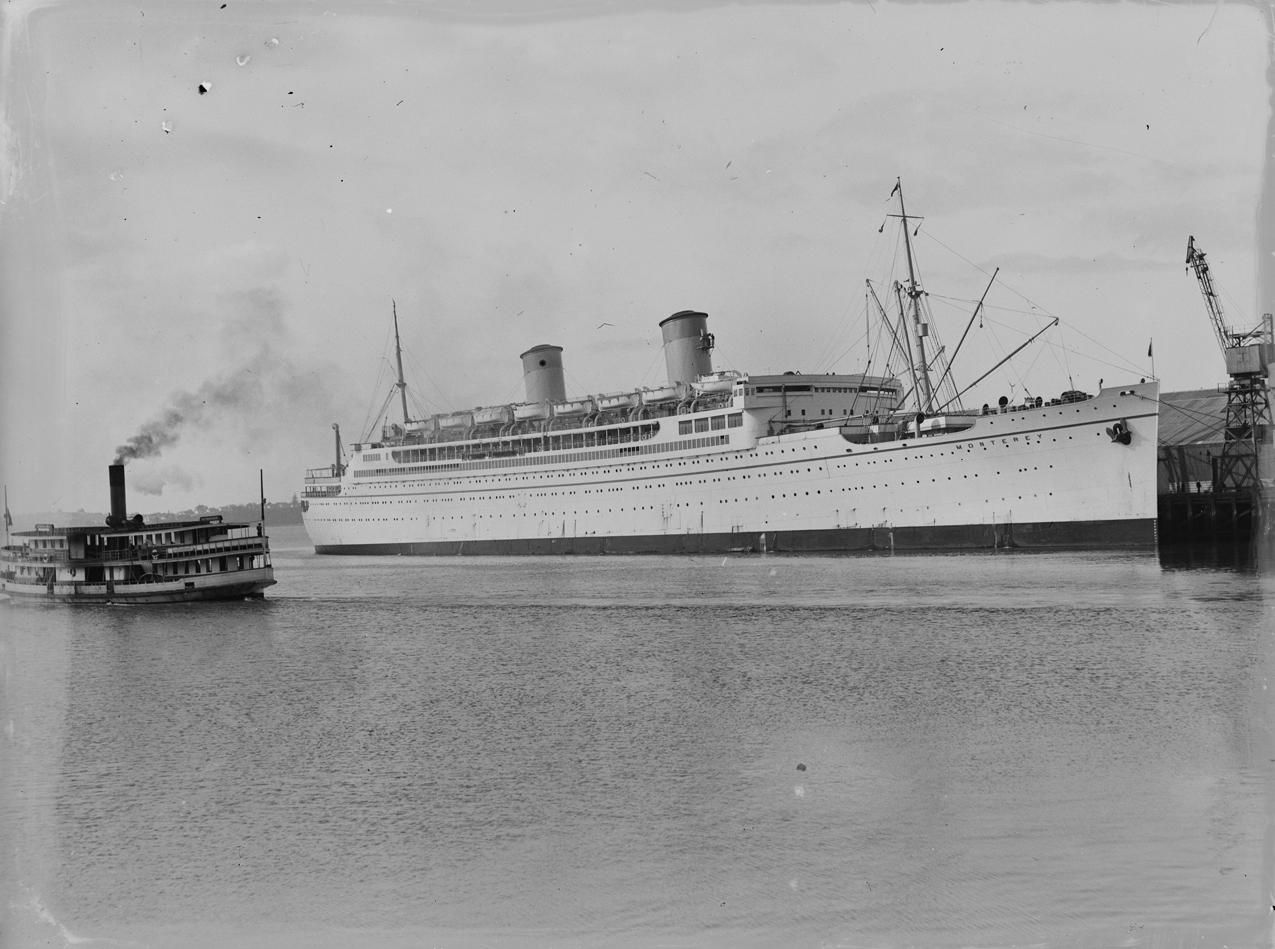
SS Monterey, possibly in the 1930s

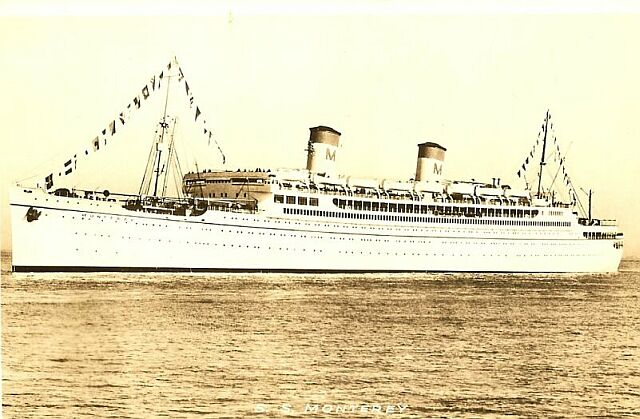
SS Monterey, 1930s

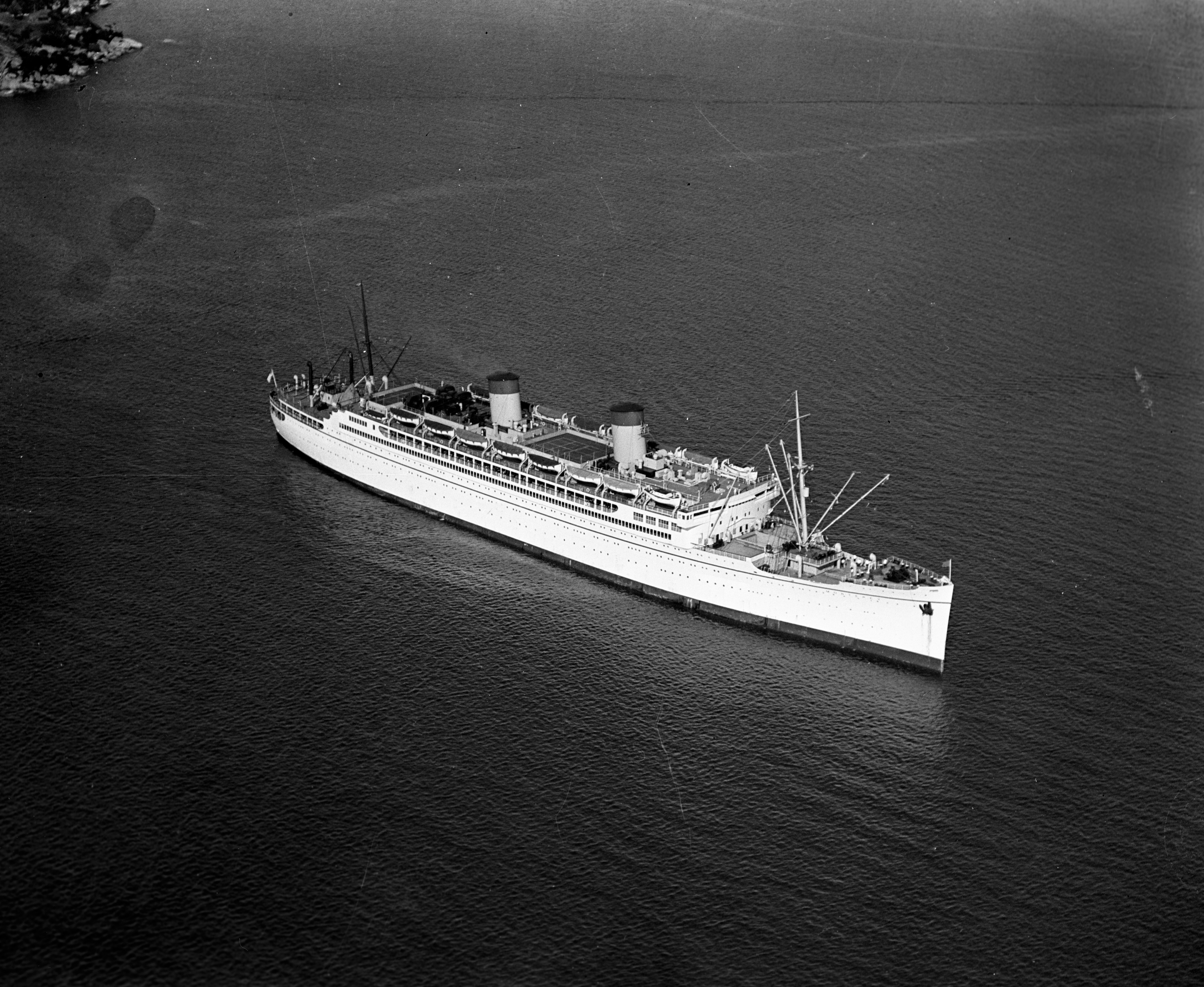
Monterey seen from above, June 1937

Monterey was built to promote travel to Hawaii and for Pacific Ocean liner service including regular stops in ports along the West Coast of the United States, Samoa, Fiji, New Zealand and Australia. On 12 May 1932 she took 83 passengers from New York City to the West Coast on a positioning cruise. Her maiden voyage officially began 3 June 1932 in San Francisco, California after which she made stops in Los Angeles, Honolulu, Auckland, Pago Pago, Suva, Sydney and Melbourne. She scored a public relations triumph when she carried much-appreciated supplies to the Bear of Oakland on Byrd's second expedition to the South Pole.

== War service ==
In World War II Monterey served as a fast troop carrier, often operating alone so she would not be slowed by formation navigation in a convoy. The United States Maritime Commission chartered her in 1941 before the US declaration of war to carry 150 Chinese, Korean and Japanese missionaries and stranded US citizens back to San Francisco. Once home, she was quickly refitted to hold 3,500 soldiers. The ship was delivered to WSA by Oceanic Steamship Company, parent company of Matson Line, 3 December 1941 at San Francisco. On 16 December 1941 she steamed to Hawaii with 3,349 fresh troops, returning with 800 casualties of the attack on Pearl Harbor.

=== War voyages ===
- 1941 With urgent need to reinforce Hawaii the Army pushed loading two fast ships, Monterey and Matsonia with troops, aircraft and ammunition in hopes of their sailing independently by 13 December. The Navy opposed any unescorted convoys and, despite Army arguments at the highest levels, the ships were delayed until the 16th when Monterey, Matsonia and Lurline sailed under escort.
- 6 January 1942 San Diego to Pago Pago filled to capacity with Marines, arrived 19 January.
- 17 February 1942 San Francisco to Brisbane with 4,000 Army troops; convoy with Matsonia and Mormacsea
- 9 March 1942 arrived Brisbane
- 22 April 1942 left San Francisco for Adelaide, Panama, Key West
- 1 July 1942 New York to Glasgow with 5,800 troops
- 6 August 1942 New York to Glasgow with 6,000 troops
- 27 August 1942 Glasgow to New York, arrived 5 September 1942
- 2 November 1942 convoy New York to Casablanca, arrived 16 November 1942
- 14 January 1943 left New York in a convoy to Casablanca; arrived 25 January
- 5 March 1943 New York to Casablanca
- 1 April 1943 sailed alone to Casablanca; arrived 12 April
- 29 April 1943 New York to Casablanca
- 2 June 1943 New York to Panama
- 26 June 1943 San Francisco to Brisbane, Panama
- 1943 New York to Brazil
- 21 August 1943 New York to Oran with the highest number of soldiers for a Matson ship: 6,855. Traveled in convoy.
- 8 October 1943 New York to Liverpool in Fast convoy UT-3 with 6,747 troops; on to Gibraltar and Naples in convoy of 43 ships.
  - The voyage to Naples was her first taste of combat. On 6 November 1943 in an action off Cape Bougaroun, Algeria, 25 aircraft attacked the convoy. Monterey shot down an enemy bomber which passed over the ship and tore away the radio mast before crashing into the ocean. In convoy, the Grace Line troopship Santa Elena was torpedoed and began to sink. Monterey rescued 1,675 using her boats and nets, taking the survivors to Naples.
- January 1944 Hawaii to Milne Bay; transporting the 6th Infantry Div, 63rd Infantry Rgmt. Sailing alone, it was betrayed by Hawaiian spies & Tokyo Rose broadcast that the 63rd Inf Rgmt was on the SS Monterey. January 18-31, 1944
- July 1944 Milne Bay to Oro Bay; ran aground, troops offloaded, ship refloated with the tide
- 21 Sept 1944 San Francisco to Oro Bay, New Guinea transporting WAC's
- 20 January 1945 left San Francisco with US and Canadian troops, as well as Royal Air Force personnel, for New Guinea
- 4 February 1945 arrived Finschafen Harbor, New Guinea
- 16 February 1946 took Australian war brides from Sydney to San Francisco, stopping along the way at Suva, Fiji and Honolulu, Hawaii.

== Post-war refits and name changes ==
On 26 September 1946 the Monterey arrived at the Bethlehem-Alameda Shipyard in Alameda, California to be reconditioned and returned to passenger service with Matson. However, only 30% of the work had been completed before the project ran overbudget. Thus, Monterey was laid up for the next five years at the Alameda compound, before being purchased by the US Government in August 1952 and being towed to nearby Suisun Bay to join the reserve fleet there.

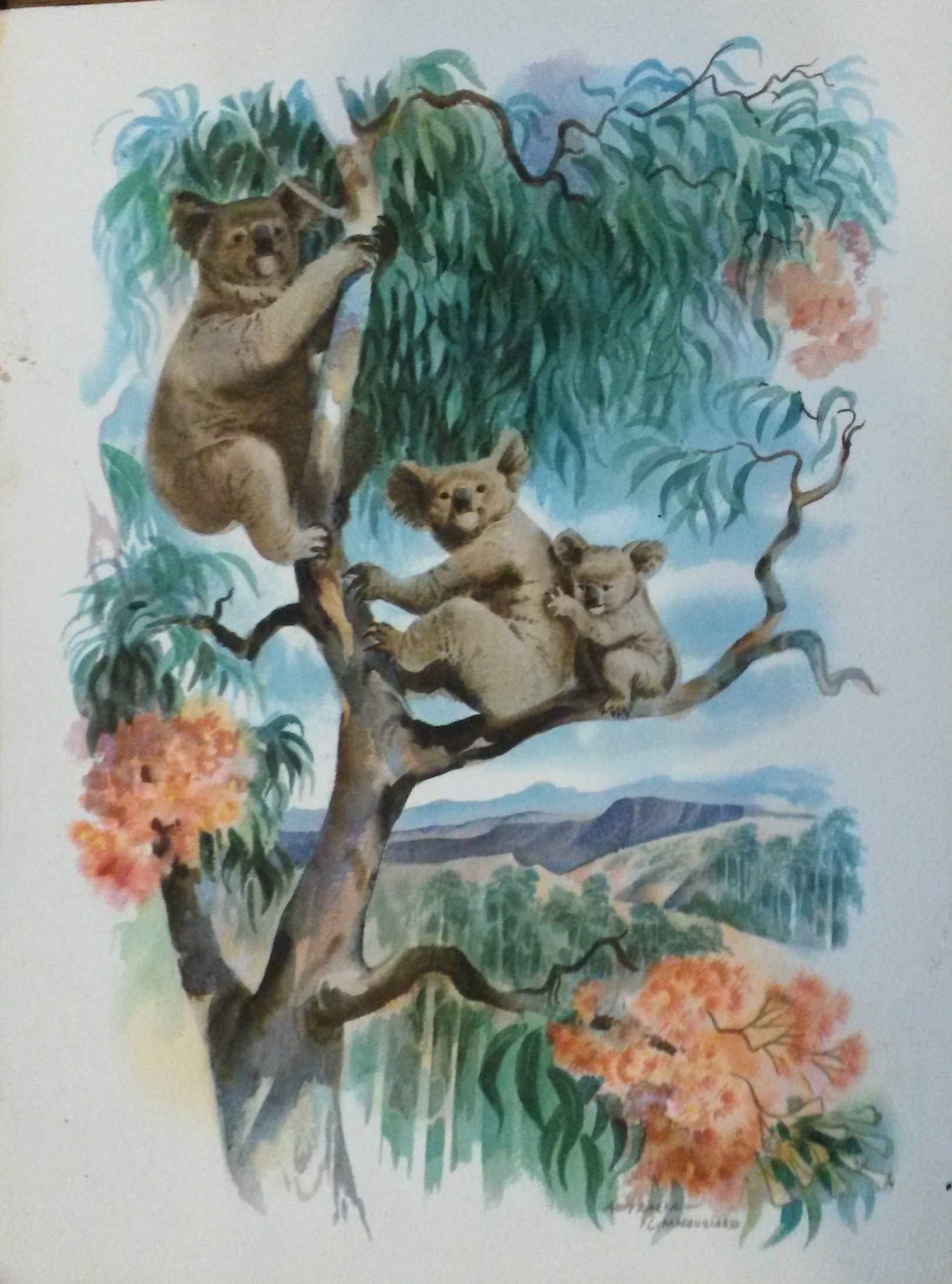
SS Monterey – Dinner menu cover for 6th October 1959.

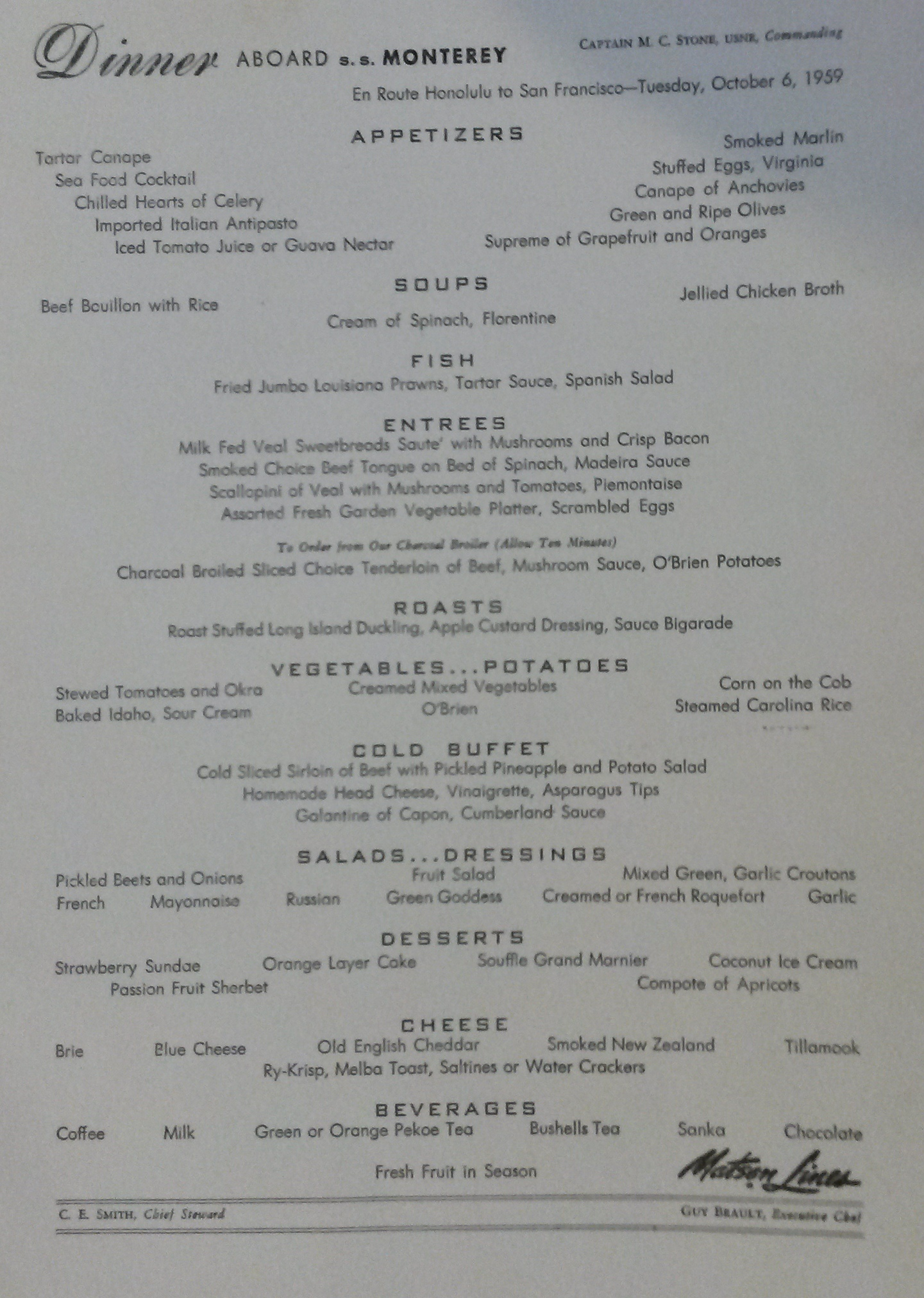
SS Monterey – Dinner menu for 6th October 1959.

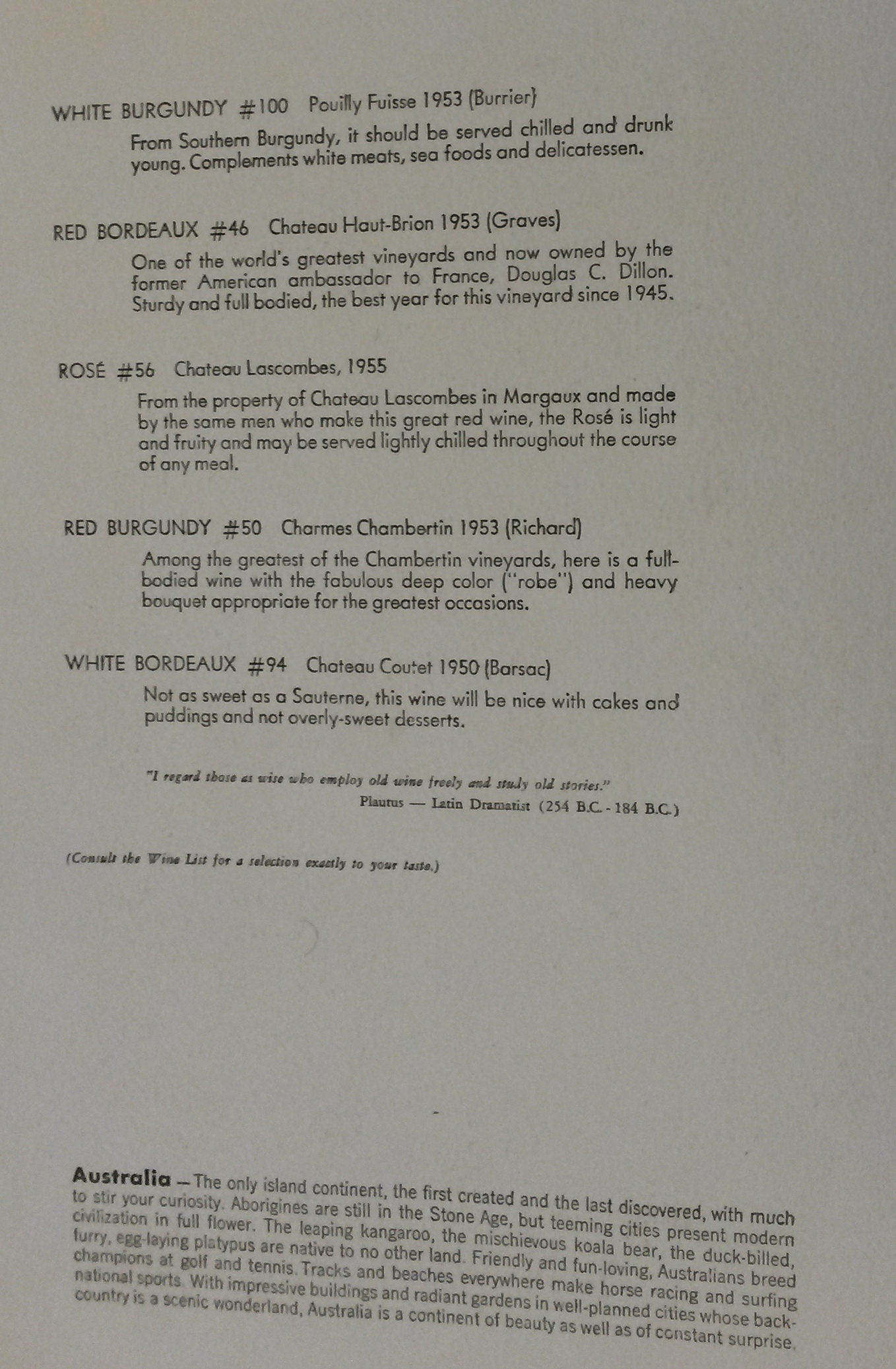
SS Monterey – Dinner menu wine list for 6th October 1959.

=== Monterey to Matsonia ===
Meanwhile, Matson was enjoying fair post-war success with Lurline and was looking to expand their passenger operation once more. Matson had a C4 "Mariner" class vessel undergoing conversion to a cruise ship for the Oceania and Australasia region; this ship was originally named Free State Mariner but Matson had renamed her Monterey. Matson repurchased the original, mothballed SS Monterey back from the US Government on 3 February 1956, but needed a new name for her: she was rechristened SS Matsonia, replacing the earlier SS Matsonia which had been sold to Home Lines in 1948 and subsequently renamed. The new Matsonia (ex-Monterey) first sailed from New York to San Francisco on 22 May 1957 to team up with her sister Lurline on the San Francisco – Los Angeles – Honolulu run.

=== Matsonia to Lurline ===
Within five years, profits from passenger service had fallen to the point where Matson decided to mothball Matsonia once again in San Francisco Bay. Sister ship Lurline remained in service but suffered a major turbine failure in February 1963; one that would require costly repairs. Instead of repairing Lurline, Matson sold the well-loved ship to Chandris Lines to be rechristened Ellinis. Stung by poor public opinion regarding the maneuver, Matson recommissioned Matsonia (ex-Monterey) and rechristened her as the new Lurline on 6 December 1963 and returned her to service.

== Lurline to Britanis ==
By 1970, passenger numbers had declined such that Matson decided to shut down passenger liner service completely. On 25 June 1970, Lurline arrived in San Francisco to be taken over by her new owners; Chandris Lines. Five days later, the now renamed Britanis steamed under new ownership out of the Golden Gate toward Piraeus under her new radio callsign SZWE (later HPEN).

== Service with Chandris Lines ==
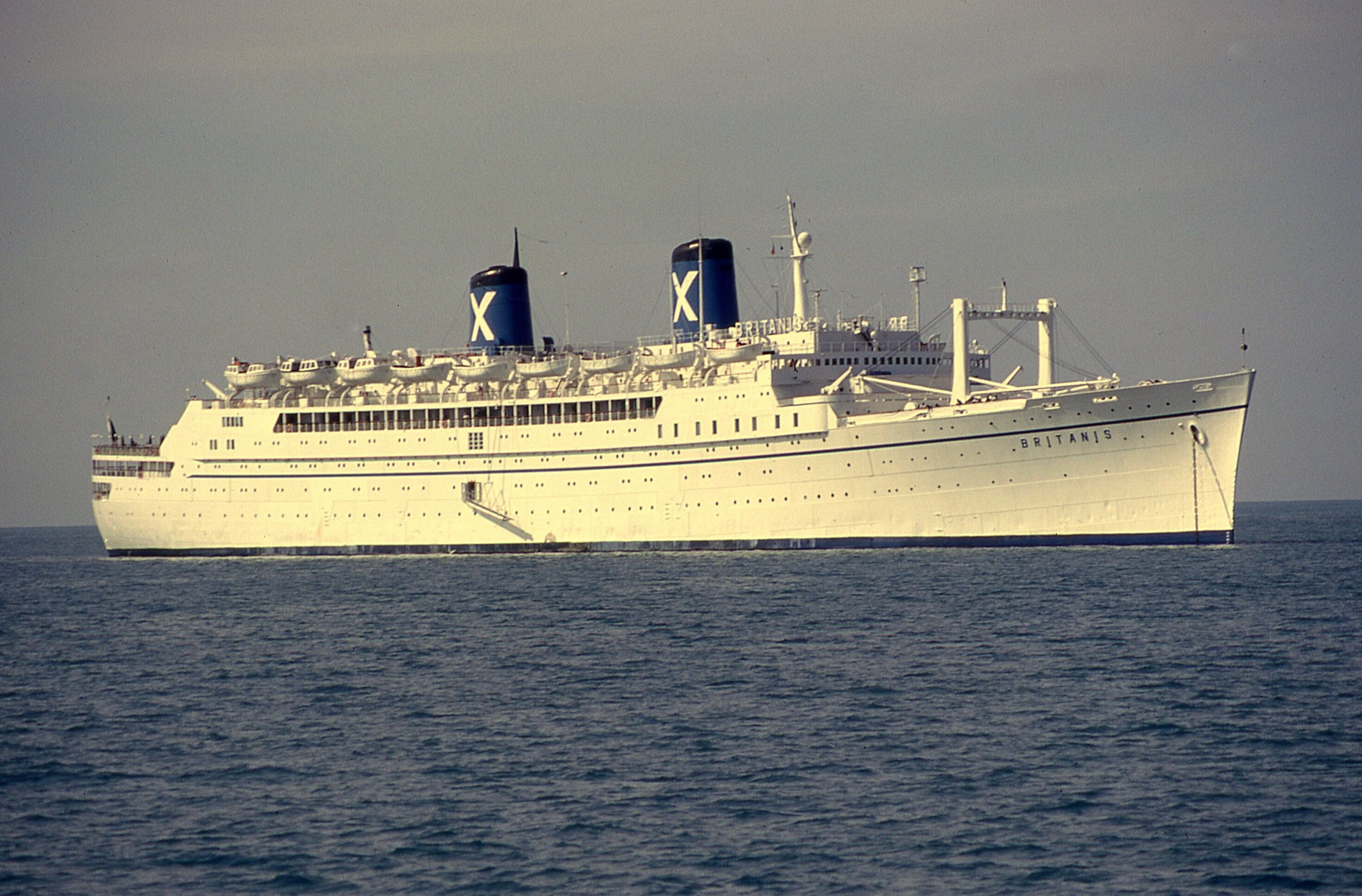
Britanis anchored off Key West on May 7, 1990

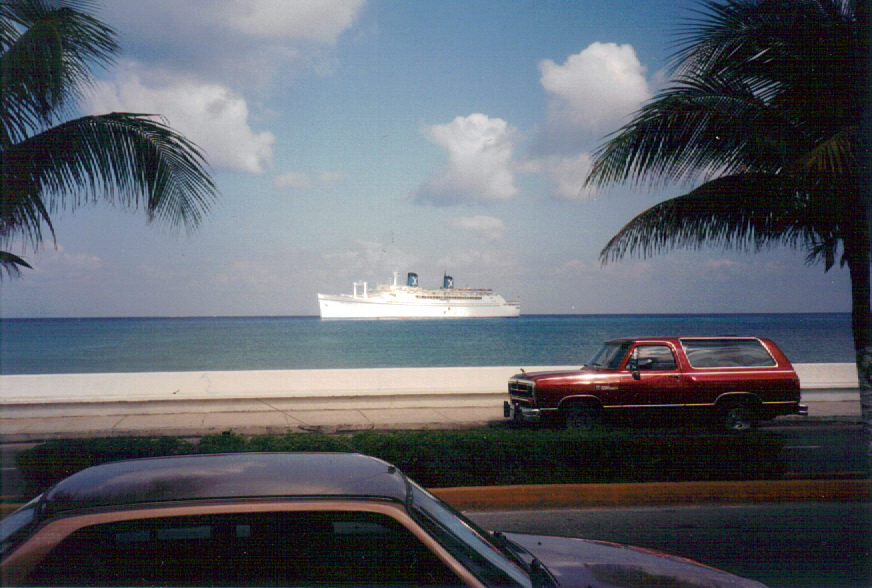
Britanis tendering at Grand Cayman

At Piraeus, Britanis was greatly modified to hold 1,655 passengers, mainly by subdividing existing larger cabins and converting cargo holds to new cabin areas. She re-entered service on 21 February 1971, leaving Southampton bound for Sydney and back; a regular round-trip she would make for three years. In 1974 she saw service as a cruise ship in the Caribbean during winter and Europe during the summer. In May 1982 Britanis cruised between New York and Bermuda with a smaller capacity of 1,200 passengers.

In winter 1983–1984, Britanis sailed from Miami to the Caribbean, then sailed from New York in the summer. A major overhaul in 1986 included engine components from her sister Ellinis (ex-Lurline), some of which went to Ellinis from Homeric (ex-Mariposa) when Homeric was scrapped in 1974. At this point, engine parts from three sister ships were now bound together in Britanis. The refit gave Britanis eight more years of Caribbean cruising until 19 November 1994.

=== US Government charter ===
Britanis was chartered by the US Government in 1994 as a floating barracks for military personnel at Guantanamo Bay, Cuba. She suffered minor damage from an electrical fire, was repaired at US Government expense, then laid up for the final time at Tampa, Florida in late 1996.

== Final years ==
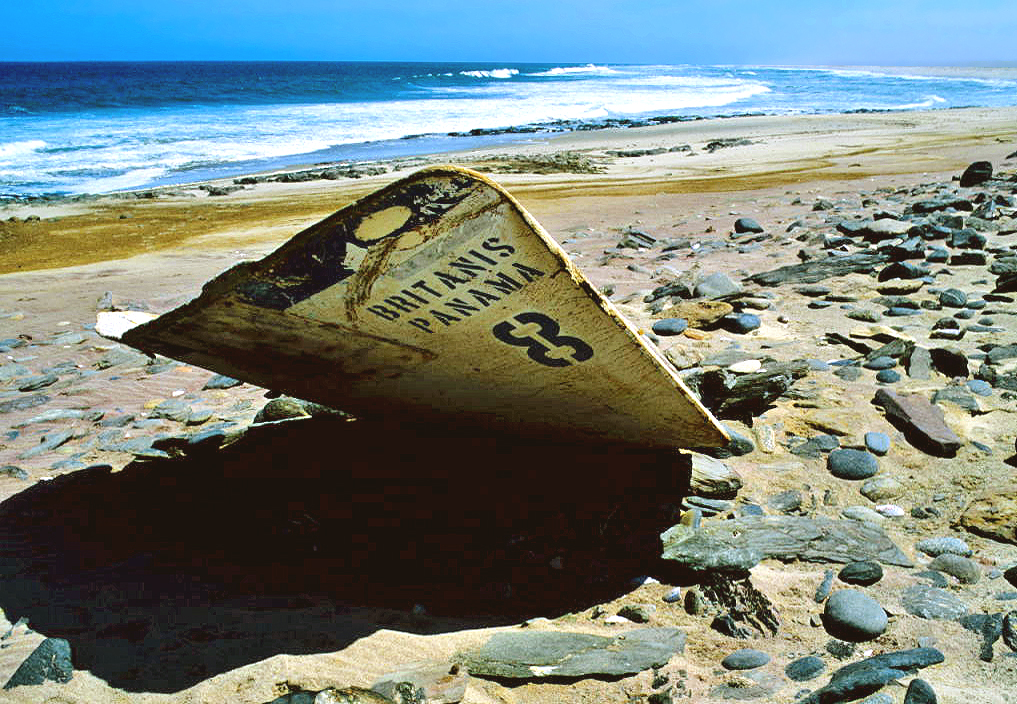
A part of one of the ship's lifeboats washed up in Namibia six years after it sunk, in 2006

Chandris opted to sell Britanis as part of a plan to cease cruise line operations for Fantasy Cruises and further invest in their newer Celebrity Cruises brand. The ship was maintained in anchorage until 24 January 1998 when she was sold to AG Belofin Investments of Liechtenstein and renamed Belofin-1. On June 9, 1999, the SF Chronicle reported that the ship may be turned into a hotel at the San Francisco Bay.

Her new owners intended to recoup their investment by selling the ship to scrappers, but a downturn in steel prices held them up for more than a year. On 3 July 2000, Belofin-1 was towed by the Ukrainian tug Iribis out of Tampa Bay with the former CN Marine ferry MV Bluenose lashed to her port side. The ships were bound for ship breakers in India, but Bluenose ended up going to Mexico. Belofin-1 apparently began taking on water and listing during the voyage but nobody was on board to correct the list. The tugboat crew cut her free and Belofin-1 capsized and sank due to progressive flooding, some 50 nmi (93 km) south of Cape Town, South Africa on 21 October 2000.

== In popular culture ==
In the Earle Stanley Gardner novel The Case of the Stuttering Bishop (1936), the titular character is revealed to have traveled from Australia to San Francisco aboard the Monterey. The ship's name was retained for the motion picture adaptation the year following the novel's publication.

The song "Bridal Train", released in 2004, is about the war brides who travelled on the Monterey in 1946, and refers to the ship by name in the opening lines.

== See also ==
- SS Mariposa (1931)
- SS Malolo (1926)
- SS Lurline (1932)
- SS Manoa (1913)
