= SS Malolo =

American ocean liner built in 1926

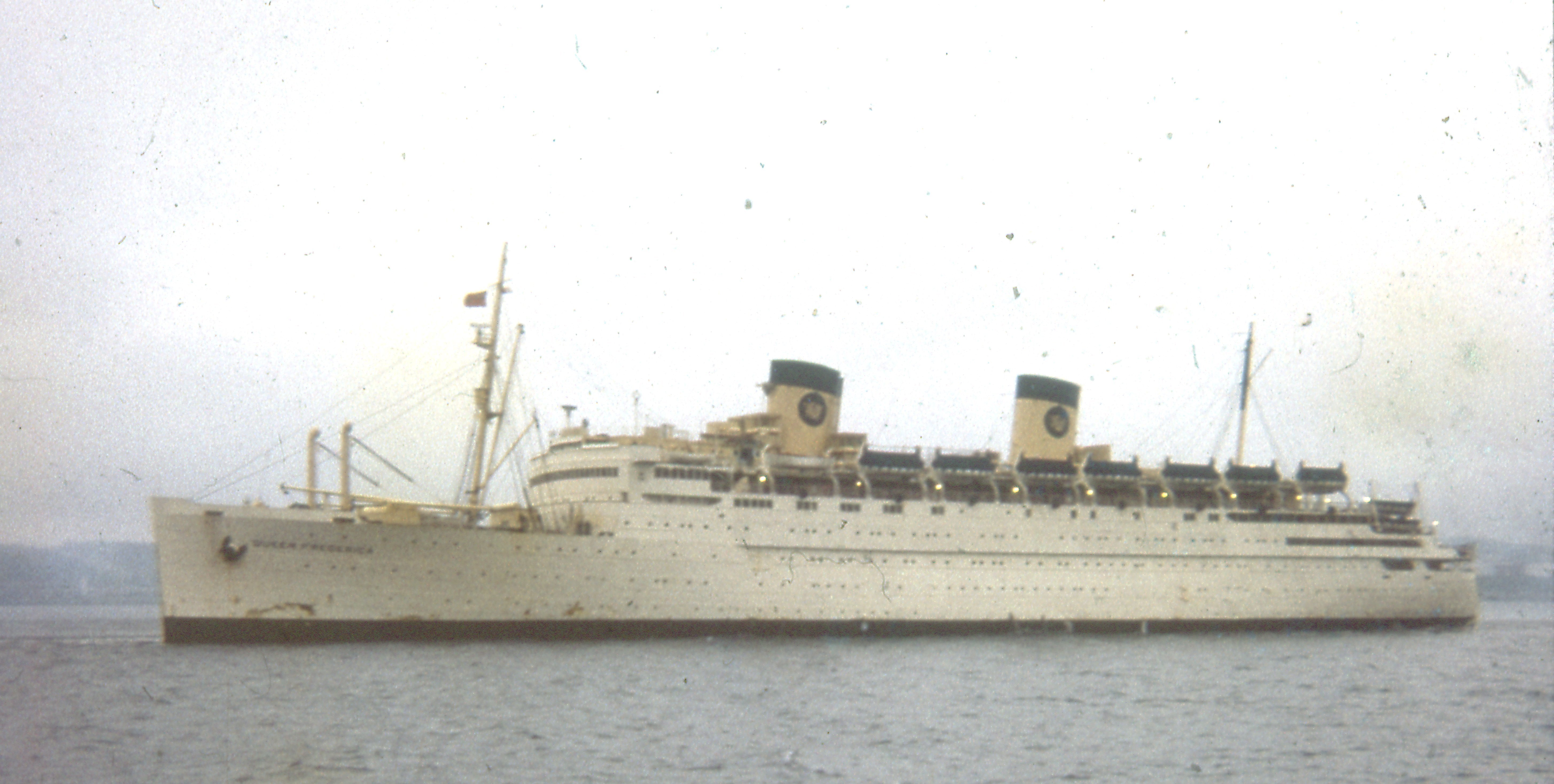
- Queen Frederica, formerly Malolo, in Halifax Harbour, 1962

History
- Name: SS Malolo
- Owner: Matson Navigation Company (1927–1948); Home Lines (1948–1965); Chandris Lines (1965–1977)
- Builder: William Cramp & Sons, Philadelphia
- Yard number: 509
- Laid down: 1925
- Launched: 26 June 1926
- Christened: 26 June 1926
- Completed: May 1927
- Maiden voyage: 16 November 1927
- Renamed: Matsonia, 1937; Atlantic, 1948; Queen Frederica, January 1955
- Identification: IMO number: 5376997
- Fate: Laid up, November 1973; Sold for scrapping in Eleusina, Greece, July 1977

General characteristics
- Tonnage: 17,226 gross register tons (GRT) (1927)
- Length: 582 ft (177 m)
- Beam: 83 ft (25 m)
- Draught: 30 ft 7 in (9.32 m)
- Decks: 5 (1926–1936); 7 (1937–1977)
- Speed: 21 knots (39 km/h; 24 mph) service; 23 knots (43 km/h; 26 mph) maximum
- Capacity: 620 passengers (457 first class, 163 cabin class)

SS Malolo was a passenger liner, later a cruise ship, built by William Cramp & Sons, Philadelphia in 1926 for the Matson Line. The largest and most luxurious American passenger ship of her era, she was the first of a number of ships designed by William Francis Gibbs for the Matson line, which did much to develop tourism in the Hawaiian Islands. Malolo (flying fish) was built for the first-class luxury service between San Francisco, Los Angeles, and Honolulu. Malolo and other Matson liners advertised superb public rooms, spacious cabins, swimming pools, a gymnasium, and a staff, including a hairdresser, to provide a high standard of service.

== History ==
=== Malolo ===
Malolo introduced improved safety standards, which influenced all subsequent American passenger liners. On 25 May 1927 while on her sea trials in the western Atlantic, she collided with SS Jacob Christensen, a Norwegian freighter, with an impact equal to that when Titanic struck an iceberg and sank 15 years earlier. Malolo's advanced watertight compartments allowed her to stay afloat and sail into New York Harbor flooded with over 7,000 tons of sea water in her hull.

On 27 October 1927, U.S. Navy Rear Admiral William S. Benson praised the design of the vessel, stating that she was thoroughly protected against submarines and torpedoes by the new arrangement of subdivision in her hull.

"Money spent on vessels of this class would not be idle during peace, and the ships would be valuable in time of war," said the admiral, who was chief of naval operations during the Great War.

Admiral Benson stated that he had been informed by marine engineering experts that the ramming incident suffered during her sea trials would have sunk almost any other merchant vessel. The officer accompanied Malolo from New York City as far as San Francisco on her maiden voyage to Honolulu. The 240 passengers aboard for her departure from the East Coast included Governor W. R. Farrington of Hawaii, and officials of the Matson Line including William P. Roth, president.

=== Matsonia ===
In 1937, Matson pulled Malolo from service for a significant refit. The lifeboats were moved two decks higher and their original space was enclosed to create additional berths, including new "Lanai Suites". Existing cabins were greatly upgraded; the ship changed from a combination of 457 first-class and 163 cabin-class accommodations to 693 first-class-only. The transformed ship was rechristened Matsonia.

=== Wartime service ===
From early 1942 through April 1946, Matsonia was operated as a troop ship by the Matson Company as agent for the War Shipping Administration.

With her duties as a troop ship completed in April 1946, she returned to commercial duties between San Francisco and Honolulu. She made her final trip for the Matson Line in April 1948. When she arrived in Los Angeles Harbor from Hawaii, 238 passengers disembarked, with 126 arriving at her final port of call in San Francisco on April 20. "Capt. William R. Meyer, Matsonia master, signed the last entry in her log - "finished with engines" - and turned the record over to Hugh Gallagher, operations vice president of the line."

=== Atlantic and Queen Frederica ===
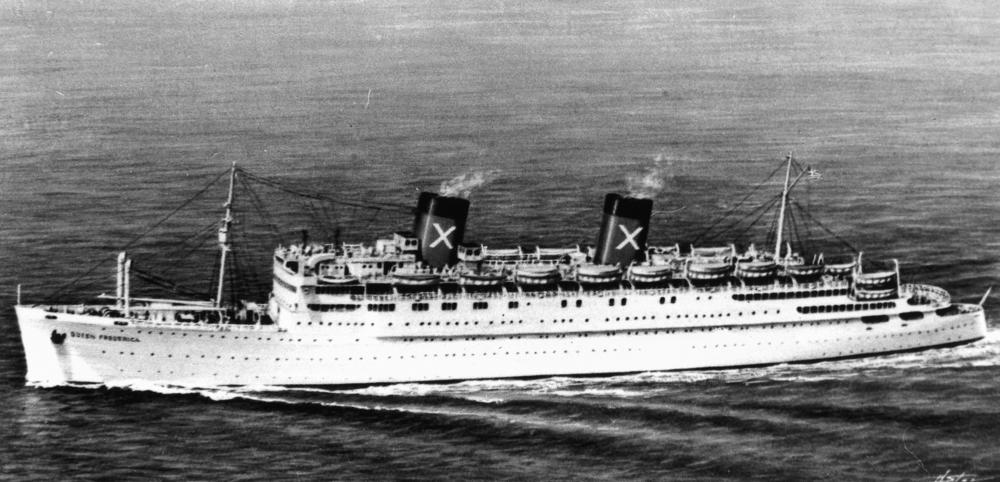
Queen Frederica

After retirement by the Matson Line, she was sold to Home Lines, which renamed her Atlantic and later Queen Frederica (after Queen Frederica of Greece) before being sold to Chandris Lines. After 50 years of service for several different companies, she was sold to Greek breakers in July 1977 and was towed to the breaker's yards at Eleusina, Greece. In February 1978 while her interiors were being demolished, she was gutted by fire and work was temporarily halted. Three years later, her remaining hull sections could still be seen among other ships at the breaker's yard.

== See also ==
- SS Mariposa (1931)
- SS Monterey (1931)
- SS Lurline (1932)
- SS Manoa (1913)
