= Exoedicerotidae =

Scientific classification
- Domain: Eukaryota
- Kingdom: Animalia
- Phylum: Arthropoda
- Class: Malacostraca
- Order: Amphipoda
- Superfamily: Oedicerotoidea
- Family: Exoedicerotidae

Family of crustaceans

Exoedicerotidae is a family of crustaceans belonging to the order Amphipoda.

== Genera ==
The following genera are recognised in the family Exoedicerotidae:

- Bathyporeiapus Schellenberg, 1931
- Exoediceroides Bousfield, 1983
- Exoediceropsis Schellenberg, 1931
- Exoediceros Stebbing, 1899
- Kanaloa J.L. Barnard, 1970
- Methalimedon Schellenberg, 1931
- Metoediceropsis Dang, 1968
- Metoediceros Schellenberg, 1931
- Notoediceros Bousfield, 1983
- Parhalimedon Chevreux, 1906
- Patuki Cooper & Fincham, 1974
- Vadosiapus Barnard & Thomas, 1988
