= Kanaloa-class freighter =

The Kanaloa class is a pair of combination container and roll on/roll off ships built for Pacific Ocean service for Matson.

== History ==
Matson ordered the ships in August 2016 from General Dynamics NASSCO, a shipbuilder in San Diego, California, at a cost of $511 million. The name Kanaloa is a reference to an ocean god in Hawaiian mythology. Construction of the first vessel, named Lurline, began in November 2017, followed by Matsonia in April 2018. Lurline was handed over to Matson in December 2019 and entered service the following month. Matsonia was launched and formally named in July 2020, with an expected delivery late in the year. Upon their entry into service, the two ships will replace three older vessels in line service between the continental United States and Hawaii.

== Design ==
The Kanaloa class ships were designed by a joint venture of General Dynamics NASSCO and Daewoo Shipbuilding & Marine Engineering. They measure 265 metres (869 ft) in length, with a beam of 34.9 metres (115 ft) and a draft of 11.5 metres (38 ft). Each ship has a containerized cargo capacity of 2,750 TEUs, and 9,650 square metres (103,900 sq ft) of interior space for up to 800 vehicles. Propulsion power is from a single MAN Diesel & Turbo 6G90ME-C10.5-Gl diesel engine (modifiable to LNG) that gives a speed of 23 knots (26 mph; 43 km/h).
