= SS Mariposa (1931) =

American ocean liner built in 1931

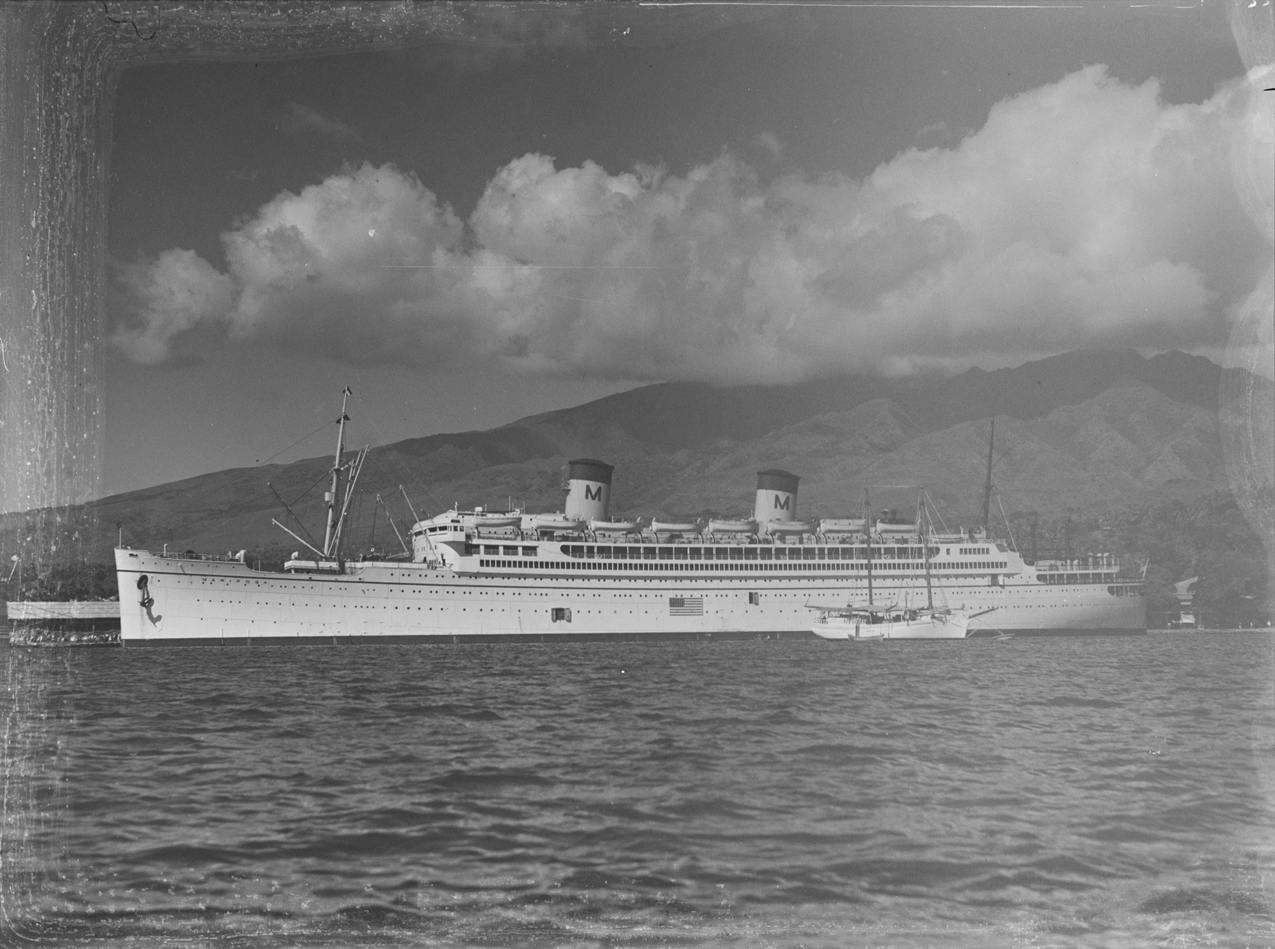
- Mariposa, 1940s

History
- Name: Mariposa
- Operator: Matson Lines; Home Lines
- Port of registry: Los Angeles
- Builder: Fore River Shipyard, Bethlehem Shipbuilding Corporation
- Launched: 18 July 1931
- Completed: December 1931
- Maiden voyage: 16 January 1932
- In service: 1932, as Mariposa; 1953, as Homeric
- Identification: US official number 231312; Code letters MJPN (until 1933); Call sign WGEN (1934 onward)
- Fate: Scrapped in 1974

General characteristics
- Type: Ocean liner
- Tonnage: 18,017 GRT, 10,580 NRT
- Length: 632 ft (193 m) length overall; 604.0 ft (184.1 m) registered length
- Beam: 79.3 ft (24.2 m)
- Draft: 28 ft 3 in (8.61 m)
- Depth: 30.5 ft (9.3 m)
- Decks: 5
- Installed power: 5,363 NHP
- Propulsion: 2 × Bethlehem geared steam turbines, 28,450 shp (21,215.16 kW)
- Speed: 22.84 knots (42.30 km/h; 26.28 mph)
- Capacity: 704 passengers (475 first class, 229 cabin class)
- Troops: 4,165
- Crew: 359
- Sensors & processing systems: Echo sounding device; Wireless direction finding; Gyrocompass

SS Mariposa was an ocean liner launched in 1931, one of four ships in the Matson Lines "White Fleet", which included SS Monterey, SS Malolo, and SS Lurline. She was later renamed SS Homeric.

== Building ==
The Bethlehem Shipbuilding Corporation built Mariposa at Quincy, Massachusetts, completing her in December 1931. Her registered length was 604.0 ft (184.1 m), her beam was 79.3 ft (24.2 m), and her depth was 30.5 ft (9.3 m). As built, her tonnages were 18,017 GRT and 10,580 NRT. She had twin screws, each driven by three steam turbines via single reduction gearing.

== Career with Matson Lines ==
Mariposa was designed for service in the Pacific Ocean, including regular stops in ports along the West Coast of the United States, Hawaii, Samoa, Fiji, New Zealand, and Australia. Her maiden voyage began 16 January 1932 in New York City, where she sailed to Havana, transited the Panama Canal, and berthed in the Port of Los Angeles before continuing on to tour 10 more countries in the south and west Pacific.

== War service ==
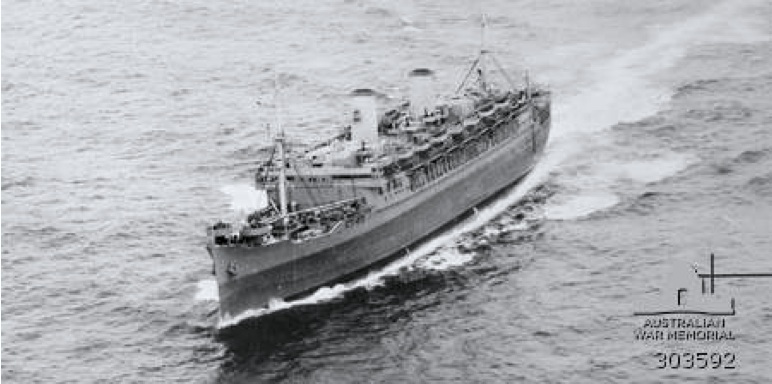
Aerial port bow view of Mariposa in March 1944

In World War II, she operated under the War Shipping Administration with allocation and close association with the US Army, though not officially a US Army Transport, serving as a fast troop carrier, bringing supplies and support forces to distant shores and rescuing persons stranded in foreign countries by the outbreak of war. Mariposa, with a Navy -designated troop capacity of 4,165 and speed of 20.5 knots (38.0 km/h), was one of the very large, fast transports, the largest nicknamed "Monsters", usually sailing without escort.

=== War voyages ===
- 14 October 1940: Mariposa, along with her sister Monterey and the SS Washington were sent to the Far East to repatriate stranded American denizens.
- 26 December 1941: She left Honolulu, Hawaii, loaded with some military personnel and many military dependents accompanied by a destroyer escort, and arrived in San Francisco 1 January 1942.
- 12 January 1942: Mariposa left San Francisco in the "Australian — Suva" convoy escorted by two destroyers and the light cruiser USS Phoenix with two other troopships SS President Coolidge and the SS President Monroe (destined for Suva). (Note: The SS President Coolidge was allocated to Navy by the War Shipping Administration (WSA) but never commissioned and thus was SS President Coolidge until sunk at Espiritu Santo 26 October 1942. The President Monroe was acquired and bareboat chartered by WSA, but not transferred to the Navy until 18 July 1943 and not commissioned until 20 August 1943 whereupon she became USS President Monroe (AP-104).) This was the first large convoy to Australia after Pearl Harbor with Mariposa transporting Army personnel, ammunition and, combined with Coolidge, fifty P-40 fighters intended for the Philippines and Java. The thirteen officers selected by the War Department to form the core of what was to become MacArthur's headquarters in the Southwest Pacific Area Command being formed in Australia as United States Army Forces in Australia (USAFIA), known as the "Remember Pearl Harbor" Group, were embarked in Coolidge and Mariposa. Most troops and equipment were intended to be sent on from Australia to the American-British-Dutch-Australian Command (ABDA) area after the Australian bound ships reached Melbourne on 1 February 1942. 35th Pursuit Group commander Clinton D. "Casey" Vincent was aboard. Mariposa made a brief stop 2 February 1942 in Melbourne before proceeding on to Perth The ship had been due to continue on with the Army fighter group to India but was withdrawn and the personnel and cargo transshipped into the two Australian transports Duntroon and Katoomba. Also on board was the 'Brownout Strangler', Private Edward Leonski.
- 19 March 1942: She left San Francisco for Australia in a convoy that included RMS Queen Elizabeth.
- 18 April 1942: She left Melbourne, Australia, for the US, carrying Dutch military personnel who had evacuated Java after the loss to the Japanese Imperial Army; she arrived 3 May 1942 in San Francisco.
- 28 May 1942: She left Charleston, South Carolina, stopping in Freetown for a week and Cape Town for a short stay before heading for Karachi.
- September 1942: She arrived at Karachi. Mariposa arrived in New York City in early September with more than 100 American Volunteer Group (Flying Tigers) pilots and ground personnel aboard. They had been denied transport back to the United States on half-empty transport planes by the US Ferry Command.
- 21 December 1942: left Newport News, Virginia unescorted carrying 5,000 military passengers
- 3 January 1943: Overnight refueling at Rio de Janeiro
- 26 January 1943: Aden for overnight refueling
- 27 January 1943: She disembarked outside Massawa
- 27 February 1943: Disembarked at Bombay
- 10 April 1943: Arrived at New York City
- 15 April 1943: Left Brooklyn Navy Yard for Casablanca carrying military medical units and troops including some Tuskegee Airmen
- 24 April 1943: Arrived at Casablanca, French Morocco
- Mid-November 1943: Left Sydney Harbour bound for San Francisco, for a 16-day cruise. Among the passengers was prominent Dutch pilot Ivan Smirnov (Romanized to "Smirnoff"). No convoy was used.
- 10 December 1943: She departed Los Angeles for Hobart, Tasmania, with 4,500 railroad troops, with no escort. During the voyage, the men were near-mutinous due to bad food.
- 26 December 1943: Docked at Hobart
- early 1944: Docked at Bombay
- 9 March 1944: Departed Los Angeles
- 8 April 1944: Arrived Bombay
- 13 April 1944: Left Bombay for Boston
- 23 May 1944: Arrived at Boston
- Spring 1944: New York to North Africa
- 8 August 1944: Left Boston for Liverpool with no escort
- 14 August 1944: Arrived at Liverpool
- 30 August 1944: Left Boston for Liverpool, sailed alone
- 7 September 1944: Arrived Liverpool
- 1 December 1944: Left Boston for Marseille, sailed alone
- 10 December 1944: Arrived Marseille
- 8 January 1945: Left Boston for Marseille
- 18 January 1945: Arrived Marseille
- 7 May 1945: En route to the US on VE Day
- 17 October 1945: Left Le Havre for Boston bringing troops home
- 24 October 1945: Arrived at Boston

1946 Australia/New Zealand dependent voyages from Australia

- 20 February 1946 (WSA operation): Departed Brisbane with 882 dependents
- 11 April 1946 (WSA operation): Departed Brisbane with 769 dependents
- 31 May 1946 (WSA operation): Departed Brisbane with 802 dependents
- 11 July 1946 (WSA operation): Departed Sydney with 230 dependents

== Career with Home Lines ==
In 1947, the ship was mothballed for six years at Union Iron Works in Alameda, California. Her engines were overhauled by Todd San Francisco Division. Home Lines bought her and renamed her SS Homeric, sailing her to Trieste for reconstruction to allow 1243 passengers: 147 first class and 1,096 tourist class. Her gross register tonnage increased to 18,563, and total length increased to 641 ft (195.5 m). Home Lines operated her beginning 24 January 1955 for liner service between ports in the north Atlantic.

On 18 August 1956, Homeric's bow struck the side of the Greek Line ship Columbia in fog in Quebec. At the time, tugs were towing Homeric and Columbia was moored at a pier. About 20 ft (6 m) of Columbia's starboard side were damaged, and some of her lifeboats were crushed.

In 1964, she replaced SS Italia to steam on the regular run between New York and Nassau, Bahamas, though she, in turn, was shortly replaced by SS Oceanic. SS Homeric was reassigned to intra-Caribbean cruises. In 1973, a major fire destroyed much of her galley and restaurant, and she was scrapped in Taiwan next to Holland America Line SS Nieuw Amsterdam in 1974. During the ship breaking process, her sister ship, the Chandris Lines' Ellinis (ex-Lurline), suffered major engine damage on a cruise to Japan; Chandris was able to purchase one of the Mariposa engines from the ship breakers.

== See also ==
- SS Mariposa (1883)
- SS Manoa (1913)
- SS Malolo (1926)
- SS Monterey (1931)
- SS Lurline (1932)
