= Matson, Inc. =

American shipping company

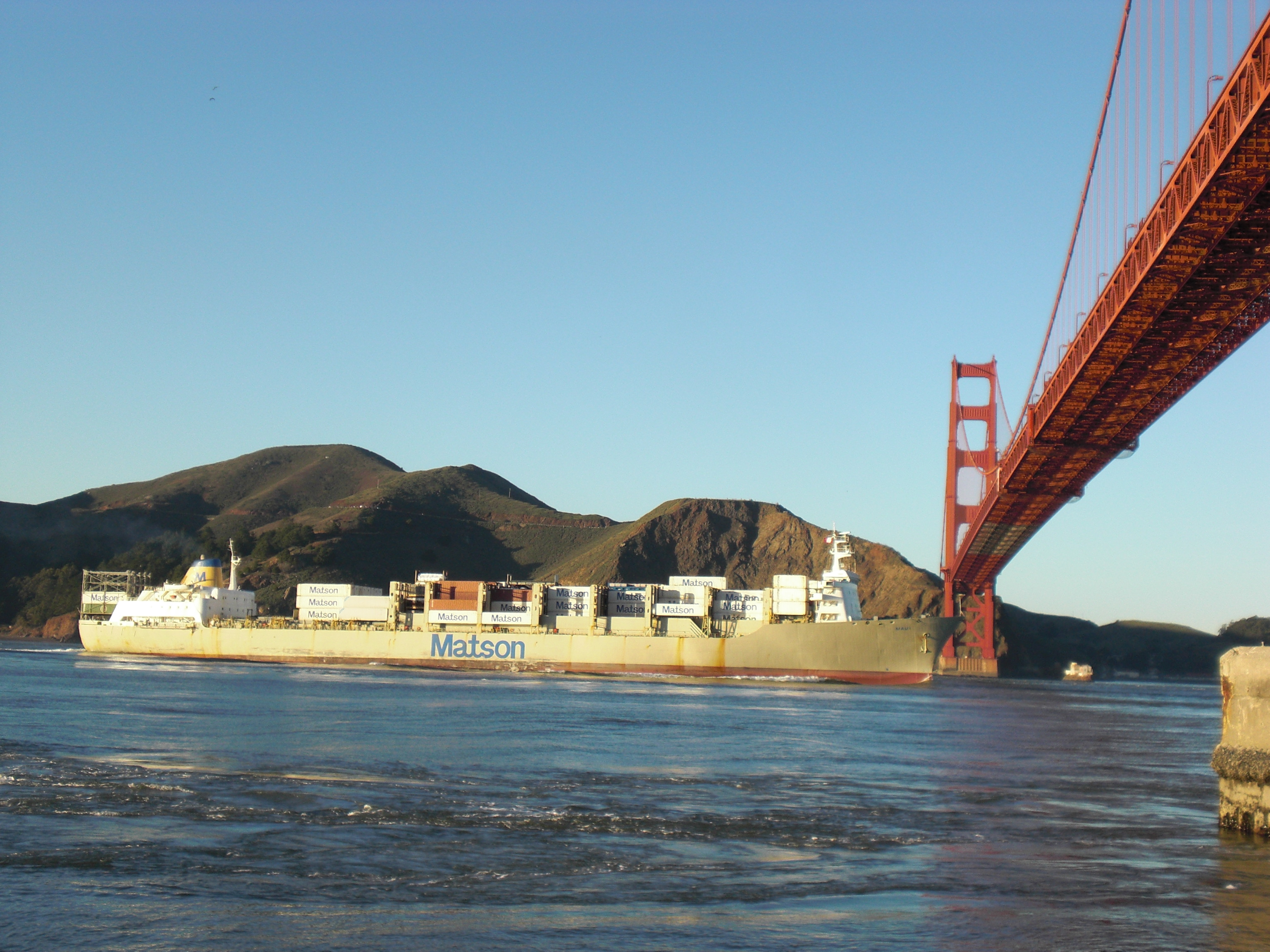
- A Matson container ship passing under the Golden Gate Bridge in San Francisco, California, US.
- Type: Public
- Traded as: NYSE: MATX; DJTA component; S&P 600 component
- Industry: Shipping, navigation
- Founded: April 10, 1882; 144 years ago (as Matson Navigation Company)
- Headquarters: Honolulu, Hawaii, U.S.
- Area served: United States
- Key people: Matthew J. Cox (Chairman and CEO)
- Revenue: ▼US$3.34 billion (2025)
- Net income: ▼US$445 million (2025)
- Number of employees: 4,356 (2024)
- Website: matson.com

Matson, Inc., is an American ocean transportation and logistics company headquartered in Honolulu, Hawaii.

Founded in 1882, Matson, Inc.'s subsidiary Matson Navigation Company provides ocean shipping services across the Pacific to Hawaii, Alaska, Guam, Micronesia, the Pacific islands, China, and Japan.

== History ==
William Matson (1849–1917) founded Matson Navigation Company. He was born in Lysekil in Västra Götaland County, Sweden, and orphaned during childhood. He arrived in San Francisco after a trip around Cape Horn in 1867. Working aboard the Dickel family yacht, he struck up a friendship with tycoon Claus Spreckels, who financed many of Matson's new ships. In 1882, he sailed his three-masted schooner Emma Claudina into the Hilo Bay of the Hawaiian Islands.

The enterprise began in the carrying of merchandise, especially of plantation stores, to the islands and returning with cargoes of sugar, later expanding interests at each end of the line.

In 1924, Matson completed the Matson Building, designed by Bliss and Faville, at 215 Market Street in San Francisco. It featured an observation tower and cupola at the northern corner of the building that enabled company executives to see its ships coming through the Golden Gate. The company later sold the building to Pacific Gas and Electric Company, whose general office was next door at 245 Market. PG&E has incorporated the former Matson Building into its general office complex, keeping Matson-specific details such as elevator doors with detailed maps of Hawaii on them.

On December 1, 2011, Matson's then-parent company Alexander & Baldwin announced that its board of directors approved a plan to split A&B and Matson into two separate companies. As part of the plan, Matson would leave Oakland, California, to become a Honolulu-based company. The two companies are now traded separately.

In 2015, Matson, Inc., acquired Horizon Lines, formerly its main competitor in the United States domestic market, for $469 million.

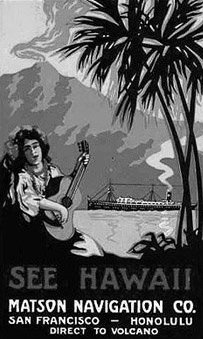
Early 20th century advertising for Matson's Hawaiian hotels

In December 2019 and July 2020, Matson took delivery of two Kanaloa-class Con-Ro ships from General Dynamics' NASSCO shipbuilding division, naming them Lurline and Matsonia, respectively, after its former passenger liners. Joining two Aloha-class freighter sister ships delivered to Matson in 2018 and 2019; in November 2022, the company again contracted Philly Shipyard to build three new 3,600 twenty-foot equivalent units (TEU) Jones Act-compliant container ships at a cost of $1 billion. The first of the three new ships was delivered to Matson, then named Makua on October 10, 2026.

=== The White Ships passenger line (1908–1979) ===
Primarily a conveyor of freight; from 1908 on, Matson introduced into service a number of passenger liners to capitalize on the burgeoning tourist trade. Matson took over the Oceanic Steamship Company in May 1926.

From the early 20th century through the 1970s, Matson liners sailed from the west coast ports of San Francisco and Los Angeles to Honolulu and points beyond, including a handful of South Pacific ports of call as well as Sydney, Australia and Auckland, New Zealand. Two of its earlier cargo liners, Maui and Wilhelmina, were the first passenger ships to place their engines aft.

Among those known as the "white ships of Matson" were Malolo (rechristened Matsonia), Lurline, Mariposa, and Monterey. With the advent and expansion of routine air travel between the mainland and the islands, Matson's passenger service was greatly diminished, and the liners were eventually retired from trans-Pacific service and virtually gone by the end of the 1970s.

=== Hotels ===
In 1925, Matson acquired a controlling interest in the historic Moana Hotel on Waikiki on the island of Oahu. They constructed the nearby Royal Hawaiian Hotel in 1927. In 1952, they built the SurfRider Hotel (today a wing of the Moana), followed by the Princess Kaiulani Hotel in 1955. Matson sold the four properties to Sheraton Hotels in 1959.

Matson Lines (airline)^{(1)}
- Founded: 1943 as the Air Transport Division of Matson Navigation
- Commenced operations: July 5, 1946
- Ceased operations: March 1948
- Operating bases: Oakland, California
- Fleet size: 6 Douglas DC-4s
- Parent company: Matson Navigation
- Headquarters: San Francisco, California

Notes
- (1) Aircraft liveries said "Matson Lines." CAB applications and airline lists said "Matson Navigation." It appears there was no entity such as "Matson Airlines."

Matson house flag

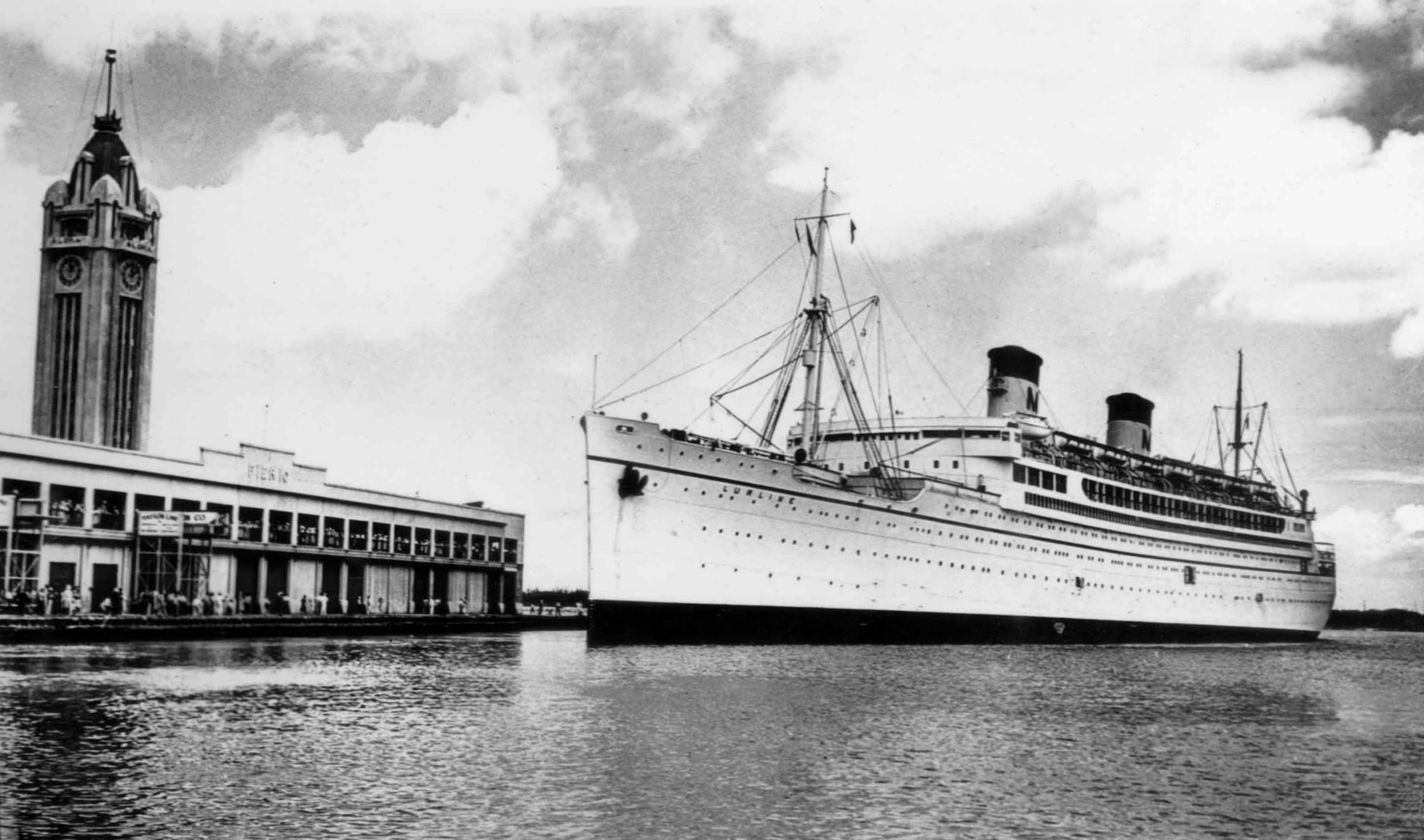
SS Lurline in the 1930s

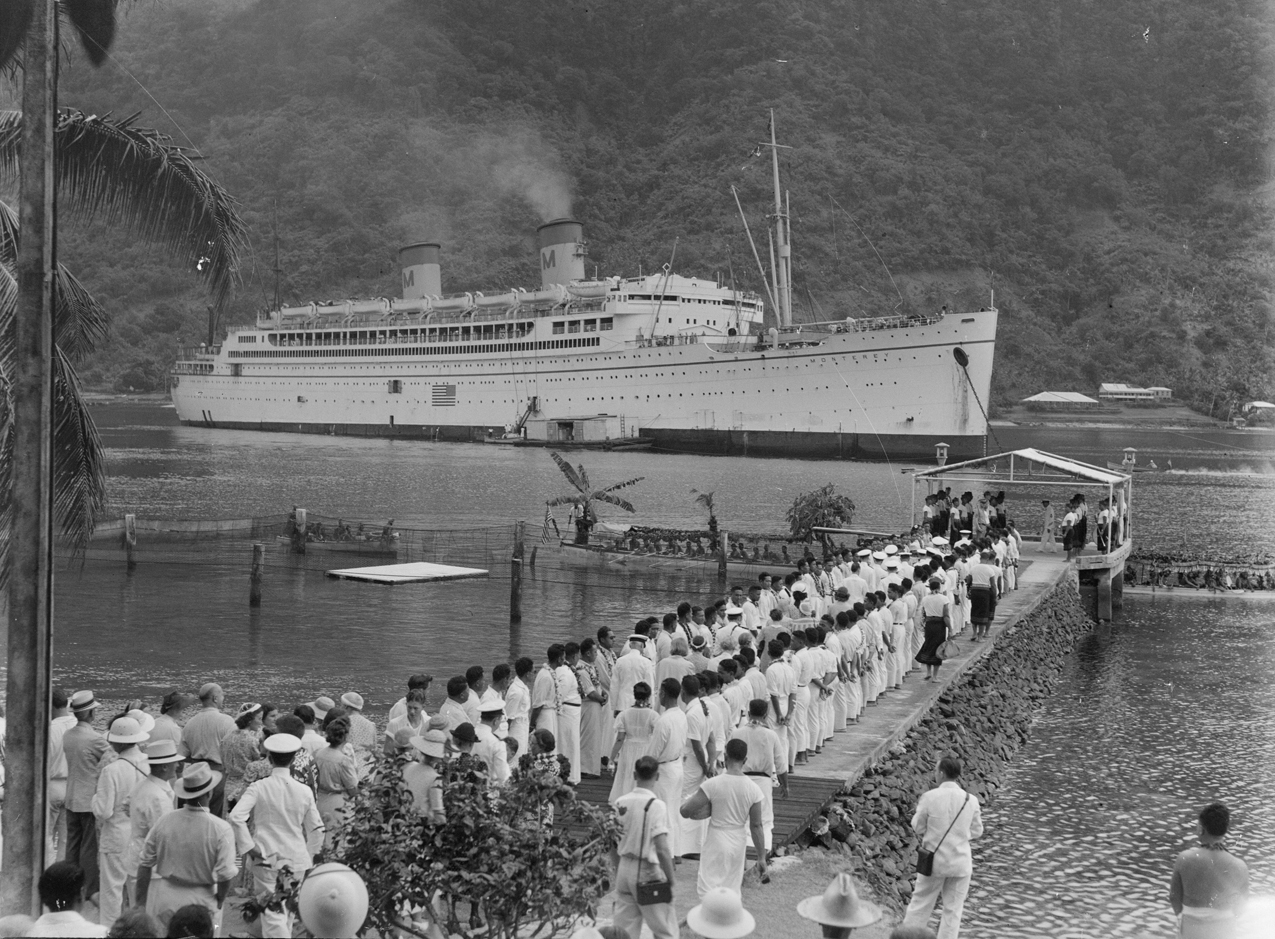
SS Monterey during World War II

=== Airline ===
From 1935, Matson backed Pan American Airways to pioneer air travel across the Pacific, taking an equity stake in the airline. The agreement called for Matson, Pan Am and Inter-Island Steam Navigation (parent of Hawaiian Airlines) to create a new carrier to fly from Hawaii to the mainland, but in 1942 this was denied by the Civil Aeronautics Board (CAB), the now-defunct Federal agency that, at the time, tightly regulated most US commercial air transport. In 1943 Matson created an Oakland, California-based Air Transport Division providing aircraft modifications for the US Navy, including R5Ds, the naval version of the Douglas DC-4. Matson also sought CAB certification of its own to fly scheduled service from Hawaii to the mainland. By 1946, the Oakland base was converting military C-54s to civilian DC-4 configuration.

The CAB was not disposed to allow surface carriers into the airline industry. In 1946 Matson started unscheduled flights to Hawaii with DC-4s anyway, with ocean-liner standards. Author and pilot Ernest K. Gann, who left American Airlines to fly for Matson, called it "possibly the finest airline ever operated in the world," with food overseen by a former chef to the Belgian king. Interiors featured "Philippine mahogany" and chrome fixtures. But the CAB rejected Matson applications four times between 1946 and 1950, closing it out of scheduled service to Hawaii. Matson dropped aviation March 1948. Matson was financially constrained: in 1947 Matson suspended a dividend it had paid since 1906 and made a loss on its Hawaii freight business. Transocean Air Lines took over Matson's Oakland maintenance base.

One significant legacy of Matson's airline was Gann's 1953 best-selling novel The High and the Mighty (and subsequent John Wayne film of the same name), inspired by his flying for Matson.

== Current fleet ==
Matson's current cargo fleet of U.S.-flagged vessels include:

- Anchorage / Kodiak / Tacoma (sister ships)
- Daniel K. Inouye / Kaimana Hila (sister ships - Aloha Class)
- Imua II / Liloa II (sister ships)
- Kamokuiki
- Lihue
- Lurline / Matsonia (sister ships - Kanaloa Class)
- Manoa / Mahimahi (C9 sister ships)
- Manulani / Maunawili / Manukai (sister ships)
- Maunalei
- Mokihana (C9 with garage conversion)
- Papa Mau
- R.J. Pfeiffer
- Haleakala
- Mauna Loa
- Waialeale

== See also ==
- Young Brothers Hawaii
- Pasha Hawaii
- List of largest container shipping companies
