= Crystal (name) =

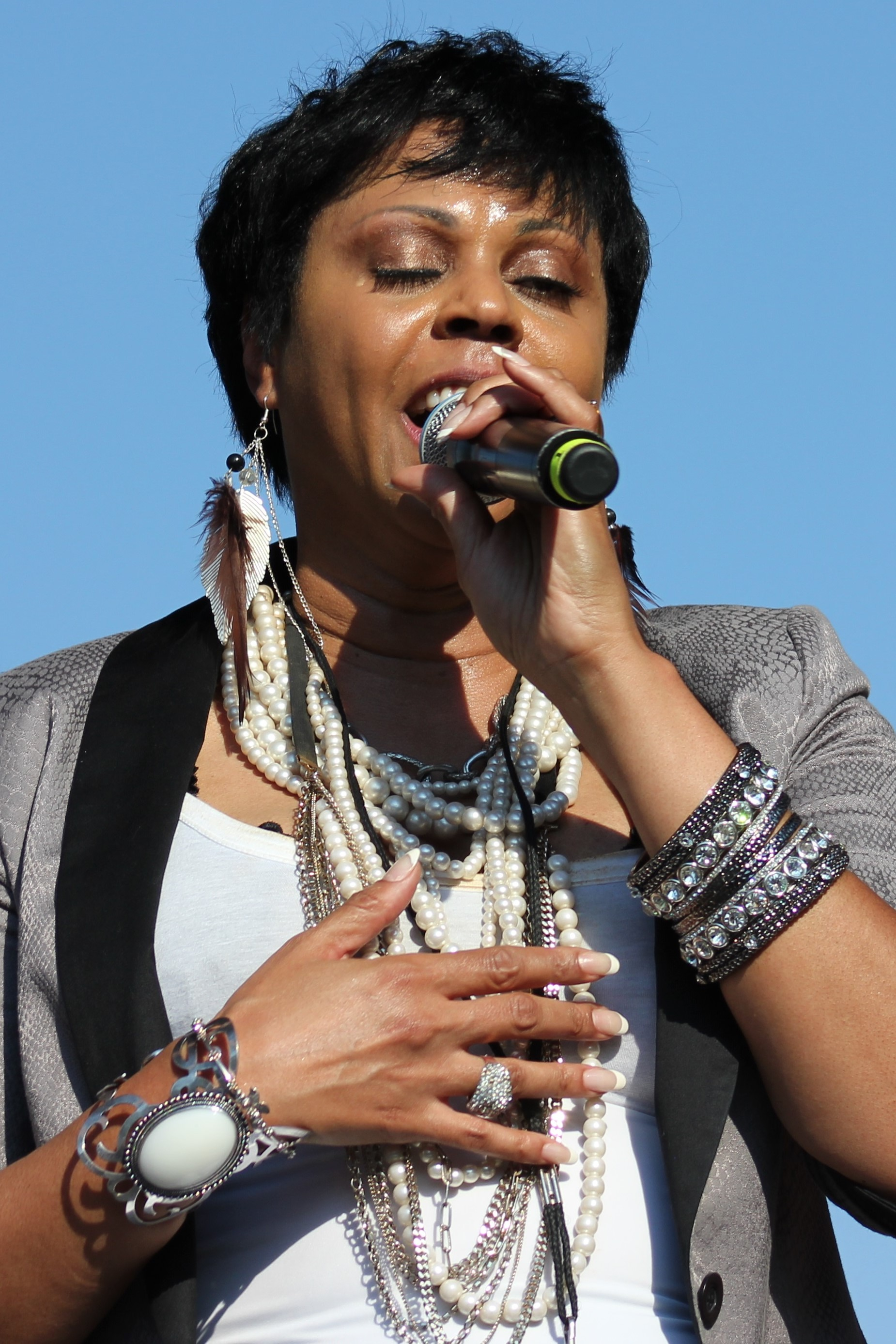
- Crystal Waters
- Pronunciation: /ˈkrɪstəl/
- Gender: Female

Origin
- Origin: Greek
- Meaning: Crystal

Other names
- Related names: Chrystal, Kristal, Krystal, Cristal, Kristel, Kristol, Krystle

Crystal (/ˈkrɪstəl/) is a common English language female given name. Variant forms of the name include Kristal, Krystal, Cristal, Kristel, Krystle, and Kristol.

As a feminine name, it is a 19th-century coinage, derived from crystal, a transparent quartz gemstone, usually colorless, that can be cut to reflect brilliant light, whose name comes from Ancient Greek κρύσταλλος krystallos "ice". It increased in usage along with other names suggestive of gemstones. As a masculine name, it is a Scottish diminutive of Christopher. Cristal is a Spanish variant. The Greek variant of the name is Crystallia or Krystallia (Κρυσταλλία). Usage of the name increased in the 1980s due to the character Krystle on the television series Dynasty.

== Usage ==
The name and its spelling variants have been well used throughout the Anglosphere. It ranked among the top 1,000 names for newborn girls in the United States between 1884 and 2021 and was among the top 100 names for American girls between 1971 and 1997. It reached peak popularity in 1982, when it was the ninth most popular name given to newborn American girls. It was among the top 100 names given to newborn girls in Canada between 1973 and 1994, and was among the top 1,000 names for girls in the United Kingdom between 1996 and 2021, among the top 100 names for girls in New Zealand between 1982 and 2000, and among the top 100 names for girls in Australia between 1982 and 1991.

== People ==
- Crystal Allen (born 1972), American film actress
- Crystal Bennett (1918–1987), British archaeologist
- Crystal Bernard (born 1961), American singer-songwriter and actress
- Crystal Bowersox (born 1985), American Idol season 9 runner-up
- Crystal Bradford (born 1993), American basketball player
- Crystal Chappell (born 1965), American actress and producer
- Crystal Cox (born 1979), American athlete and contestant on the reality show Survivor: Gabon
- Crystal Drakes, Barbadian politician
- Crystal Eastman (1881–1928), American lawyer
- Crystal Marie Fleming (born 1981), American sociologist and author
- Crystal Gayle (born 1951), American country music singer
- Crystal Harris (born 1986), American glamour model, singer and television personality
- Crystal Hayes (born 1984), American beauty queen
- Crystal Huang (born 1977), American table tennis player
- Crystal Hunt (born 1985), American actress
- Crystal Kay (born 1986), Japanese singer and songwriter
- Crystal Kelly (born 1986), American basketball player
- Crystal Kiang (born 1990), Taiwanese-American figure skater
- Crystal Lane-Wright (born 1985), British Paralympic cyclist
- Crystal Langhorne (born 1986), American basketball player
- Crystal Lewis (born 1969), American contemporary Christian/Gospel vocalist, songwriter and author
- Crystal Liu, known as Liu Yifei (born 1987), Chinese-American actress, singer, and model
- Crystal Lowe (born 1981), Canadian actress and model
- Crystal Lucas-Perry, American stage actress
- Crystal Mangum (born 1978), African-American woman noted for false allegations of rape
- Crystal McKellar (born 1975 or 1976), American actress
- Crystal Oldman (fl. 2026), British nursing leader
- Crystal Poh (1999–2002), three-year-old victim of a 2002 murder case in Singapore
- Crystal Reed (born 1985), American television and film actress
- Crystal Renn (born 1986), American model
- Crystal Soubrier, née Dunn (born 1992), American footballer
- Crystal Taliefero (born 1963), American multi-instrumentalist and vocalist (Billy Joel band)
- Crystal Waters (born 1961), American dance music singer and songwriter
- Crystal Yi, known as Lee Soo-jung (born 1993), Korean-American singer-songwriter
- Crystal Yu (born 1988), Chinese television, film and stage actress

== Fictional characters ==
- Crystalia 'Crystal' Amaquelin, an Inhuman from Marvel Comics
- Crystal Bailey, an antagonist in the videogame Dead Rising 2
- Crystal Winter, the daughter of the Snow King and Queen from the Mattel franchise Ever After High
- Crystal, one of the characters in the manga Pokémon Adventures
- Crystal, from Scooby-Doo and the Alien Invaders
- Crystal, introduced in Frosty’s Winter Wonderland, voiced by Shelley Winter’s, as Frosty the Snowman’s wife.
- Crystal the Snow Fairy, from the Rainbow Magic book franchise
- Crystal, character from Super Wings
