= Brittany (disambiguation) =

Brittany is a historical province of France. It may also refer to the following affiliation:

- Duchy of Brittany, an historical administrative unit
- Brittany (administrative region), the present-day administrative region of Brittany, in France, which is smaller than the historical province of Brittany

Brittany may also refer to:

- Brittany (dog), a breed of dog
- Brittany, Louisiana, a community in the United States
- French Brittany (dog), a breed of dog
- Brittany (name), a feminine name (variants include Britnee, Britney, Brittney)
- SS Brittany, one of a number of ships
- Brittany Apartment Building, Cincinnati, Ohio
- "Britney/Brittany", an episode of Glee

== See also ==
- Britney (disambiguation)
- Bretagne (disambiguation)
- Brytany (former name), an urban-type settlement in Ukraine
