= Bretagne =

Bretagne may refer to:

== Places ==
- Brittany, the historic province in northwestern France called Bretagne in French
- Brittany (administrative region), the present-day French region, also called Bretagne in French, smaller than the historic province
- Bretagne, Indre, a French village in the Indre department
- Bretagne, Territoire de Belfort, a French village in the Territoire de Belfort department
- Bretagne-d'Armagnac, a commune in the Gers department
- Bretagne-de-Marsan, a commune in the Landes department
- Dol-de-Bretagne, a commune in the Ille-et-Vilaine department
- Bretagne, a station on Île-de-France tramway Line 7

Bretagne may also refer to Great Britain in relation to the Matter of Britain (French: matière de Bretagne).

== Ships ==
- French ship Bretagne, several ships of the French Navy, including:
  - French ship Bretagne (1766), a large 110-gun French ship of the line
  - French ship Bretagne (1855), a fast 130-gun warship of the French Navy
  - French battleship Bretagne (1913), the first Bretagne-class battleship of the French Navy
  - French frigate Bretagne (2016), a multi-purpose frigate of the French Navy
- SS Bretagne, several merchant ships, including:
  - SS La Bretagne, an ocean liner of the Compagnie Générale Transatlantique in service from 1886 to 1912
  - SS Bretagne (1951), an ocean liner renamed SS Brittany in 1962
- MV Bretagne (1989), a ferry-boat operated by Brittany Ferries

== Other ==
- Le Bretagne, several French Air Force air units so named since 1942 (since 4 October 2019, now ERVTS 1/31 'Bretagne')
- Operation Bretagne, a military operation between 1952 and 1953 of the First Indochina War
- Sud-Ouest Bretagne, a French airliner of the 1940s
- Tour Bretagne (or Brittany Tower), a skyscraper in Nantes
- TER Bretagne, the regional rail network serving Brittany
- Bleus de Bretagne (or Breton Blues), a liberal organization in Brittany
- Bretagne (rescue dog), last surviving rescue dog of the 9/11 attacks

== See also ==
- Brittany (disambiguation)
