= List of the most popular names in the 1980s in the United States =

These are the most popular given names in the United States for each year in the 1980s.

	1980	1981	1982	1983	1984	1985	1986	1987	1988	1989
Male
1	Michael	Michael	Michael	Michael	Michael	Michael	Michael	Michael	Michael	Michael
2	Christopher	Christopher	Christopher	Christopher	Christopher	Christopher	Christopher	Christopher	Christopher	Christopher
3	Jason	Matthew	Matthew	Matthew	Matthew	Matthew	Matthew	Matthew	Matthew	Matthew
4	David	Jason	Jason	David	Joshua	Joshua	Joshua	Joshua	Joshua	
5	James	David	David	Joshua	David	Daniel	David	David	Andrew	David
6	Matthew	Joshua	James	James	Daniel	David	Daniel	Andrew	David	Daniel
7	Joshua	James	Joshua	Jason	James	James	James	Daniel	Justin	Andrew
8	John	John	John	Daniel	John	Robert	Andrew	James	Daniel	Justin
9	Robert	Robert	Robert	John	Robert	John	Robert	Justin	James	James
10	Joseph	Daniel	Daniel	Robert	Joseph	Joseph	John	Robert		
Female
1	Jennifer	Jennifer	Jennifer	Jennifer	Jennifer	Jessica	Jessica	Jessica	Jessica	Jessica
2	Amanda	Jessica	Jessica	Jessica	Jessica	Ashley	Ashley	Ashley	Ashley	Ashley
3	Jessica	Amanda	Amanda	Amanda	Ashley	Jennifer	Amanda	Amanda	Amanda	Brittany
4	Melissa	Sarah	Sarah	Ashley	Amanda	Amanda	Jennifer	Jennifer	Sarah	Amanda
5	Sarah	Melissa	Melissa	Sarah	Sarah	Sarah	Sarah	Sarah	Jennifer	Sarah
6	Heather	Amy	Nicole	Melissa	Stephanie	Stephanie	Stephanie	Stephanie	Brittany	Samantha
7	Nicole	Nicole	Stephanie	Nicole	Nicole	Nicole	Nicole	Brittany	Stephanie	Jennifer
8	Amy	Stephanie	Elizabeth	Stephanie	Melissa	Heather	Brittany	Nicole	Samantha	Stephanie
9	Elizabeth	Elizabeth	Crystal	Heather	Heather	Elizabeth	Heather	Heather	Nicole	Lauren
10	Michelle	Heather	Amy	Elizabeth	Elizabeth	Megan	Elizabeth	Elizabeth	Elizabeth	Elizabeth

== See also ==
- Popularity of birth names for females (United States)
