= Brittny =

Brittny is a feminine given name, similar to Brittany and Britney.

== List of people with the given name ==
- Brittny Anderson, Canadian politician
- Brittny Gastineau (born 1982), American model, socialite, and reality television personality
- Brittny Ward, American model
