= Kristol =

Kristol is a surname. Notable people with the surname include:

- Bill Kristol (born 1952), American neoconservative pundit
- David Kristol (1938–2025), American chemistry professor
- Irving Kristol (1920–2009), American neoconservative
- Ljuba Kristol (born 1944), Israeli chess champion

== See also ==
- Crystal (disambiguation)
- Kristel, given name and surname
- Krystal (disambiguation)
- Cristal (disambiguation)
- Chrystal (disambiguation)
