= Kristal =

Kristal, meaning "crystal" in several languages, may refer to:

- Kristal (name), a given name and a surname
- KRISTAL Audio Engine, a digital audio editor
- The Kristal, a video game

== See also ==
- Kristall (disambiguation)
- Kristol, a surname
- Krystal (disambiguation)
- Crystal (disambiguation), since many things called "Kristal" in their native languages
