= Xtal (disambiguation) =

Xtal is an informal abbreviation for crystals (as a reference designator on printed circuit boards).

Xtal may also refer to:

- X-tal, a San Francisco-based rock band
- Xtal DOS, the operating system for the Tatung Einstein personal computer
- "Xtal", a track by Aphex Twin from the 1992 album Selected Ambient Works 85–92
- XTAL, a market identifier code for the European stock exchange in Tallinn, Estonia
- XTAL, a brand of virtual and mixed reality headsets (VR/MR) by Vrgineers
- Xtal, a crystal oscillator (on a PCB design schematics)
- Xtal, an abbreviation for Astral Detritus per Drakeman in the MMORPG Final Fantasy XI.

== See also ==
- Crystal (disambiguation)
