= Krystle (given name) =

Female given name

Krystle is a feminine given name. Notable people with the name include:

- Krystle D'Souza (born 1990), Indian actress
- Krystle Matthews (born 1981), American politician
- Krystle Delgado, American singer
- Krystle Esdelle (born 1984), Trinidad and Tobago female volleyball player
- Krystle McLaughlin, Caribbean-American structural biophysicist

== Fictional characters ==
- Krystle Carrington, a fictional character from the 1980s American TV series Dynasty

== See also ==
- Crystal (given name)
