= Wesley Drewett Black =

Canadian politician (1910–2000)

Member of the British Columbia Legislative Assembly for Nelson-Creston
- In office June 12, 1952 – August 30, 1972
- Preceded by: Walter Hendricks
- Succeeded by: Lorne Nicolson

Personal details
- Born: November 27, 1910 Vancouver, British Columbia
- Died: January 10, 2000 (aged 89) Victoria, British Columbia
- Cause of death: Pneumonia
- Party: Social Credit
- Spouse: Helen MacKay

Wesley Drewett Black (November 27, 1910 – January 10, 2000) was an educator and political figure in British Columbia. He represented Nelson-Creston in the Legislative Assembly of British Columbia from 1952 to 1972 as a Social Credit member.

He was born in Vancouver, British Columbia, the son of Daniel James Black and Edith Elizabeth Marshall, and was educated in Vancouver and at the University of British Columbia. In 1938, Black married Helen MacKay. He served in the provincial cabinet as Provincial Secretary, Minister of Municipal Affairs, Minister of Social Welfare, Minister of Highways and Minister of Health Services and Hospital Insurance. Black was defeated when he ran for reelection in 1972. He died of pneumonia at the Royal Jubilee Hospital in 2000.
