= Crystal (disambiguation) =

A crystal is a form of solid matter whose constituent atoms, molecules, or ions are arranged in an orderly repeating pattern.

Crystal or Crystals may also refer to:

== Art, entertainment, and media ==
=== Music ===
- The Crystals, an American pop music girl group
- Crystal (singer) (born 1964), Mexican singer, actress and athlete
- Crystal, the former name of Dead Pony

==== Albums ====
- Crystal (Crystal Gayle album), 1976
- Crystal (Ahmad Jamal album), 1987
- Crystal (Double album), 1999
- Crystals (Sam Rivers album), 1974
- Crystals (Eskimo Callboy album), 2015

==== Songs ====
- "Crystal" (New Order song), 2001
- "Crystal" (Fleetwood Mac song), 1975
- "Crystals" (song), a song by Of Monsters and Men, 2015
- "Crystal", a song by Pablo Cruise, 1976
- "Crystal", a song by Frank Ifield, 1979
- "Crystal", a song by Michael Martin Murphey from his 1982 eponymous album
- "Crystal", a song by Nova, 1983
- "Crystal", a song by Elton John from Too Low for Zero, 1983
- "Crystal", a song by Hüsker Dü from Candy Apple Grey, 1986
- "Crystal", a song by Curve from Cuckoo, 1993
- "Crystals", a song by The Badgeman, 1990

=== Other art, entertainment, and media ===
- Crystal (character), a character in Marvel Comics
- Crystal (film), an upcoming American film directed by William H. Macy
- Crystal (novel), a 1987 novel by Walter Dean Myers
- Crystal (Cirque du Soleil), a theatrical show featuring ice skating
- "Crystal" (The Secret Circle), a television episode
- "Crystal", a poem by Patti Smith in the Seventh Heaven collection
- Pokémon Crystal, an updated version of Pokémon Gold and Silver released in 2000 for the Game Boy Color
- Crystal Dynamics, an American video game developer

== People ==
- Crystal (given name), a female given name
- Crystal (surname), a surname

== Places ==
- Crystal, Colorado
- Crystal, Indiana
- Crystal, Maine
- Crystal, Michigan
- Crystal, Minnesota
- Crystal City, Missouri
- Crystal, Clark County, Nevada
- Crystal, Nye County, Nevada
- Crystal, New Mexico
- Crystal, North Dakota
- Crystal, West Virginia
- Crystal, Wisconsin
- Crystal Lake (disambiguation)
- Crystal Palace (disambiguation)
- Crystal Township, Hancock County, Iowa
- Crystal Township, Tama County, Iowa
- Crystal Township, Montcalm County, Michigan
- Crystal Township, Oceana County, Michigan
- The Crystal, a building in London

== Science and engineering ==
- Crystal system, a mathematical physics description of crystals.
- Crystal (mathematics), a concept introduced by Grothendieck generalizing quasicoherent sheaves
- Crystal oscillator, an electronic oscillator circuit

== Software ==
- Crystal (programming language), a Ruby-inspired programming language
- CRYSTAL, a quantum chemistry calculation software
- Digital Research's Graphics Environment Manager (GEM), originally code-named Crystal

== Other uses ==
- Crystal the Monkey, a female capuchin monkey and animal actress
- Crystal (steamboat), a Puget Sound steamboat that operated in the early 1900s
- MV ACX Crystal, a container ship of the ACX shipping line sometimes simply called "Crystal"
- CRYSTAL, code name for the KH-11 Kennen spy satellites
- Crystal Mover, a people mover system manufactured in Japan by Mitsubishi
- Crystal Cathedral, in Garden Grove, CA
- Lead glass, commonly called crystal. Other materials are also employed to create "lead-free crystal glassware".
- Crystal healing, a pseudoscientific alternative medicine technique that uses semiprecious stones and crystals
- Crystal Semiconductor - audio electronics company acquired by Cirrus Logic
- Crystal meth, methamphetamine
- Montreal Crystals, a former Canadian ice hockey team

== See also ==
- Chrystal (disambiguation)
- Cristal (disambiguation)
- Kristallen, meaning The Crystal, the official Swedish television award
- Krystal (disambiguation)
