= List of the most popular names in the 1990s in the United States =

These are the most popular given names in the United States for each year in the 1990s.

	1990	1991	1992	1993	1994	1995	1996	1997	1998	1999
Male
1	Michael	Michael	Michael	Michael	Michael	Michael	Michael	Michael	Michael	Jacob
2	Christopher	Christopher	Christopher	Christopher	Christopher	Matthew	Matthew	Jacob	Jacob	Michael
3	Matthew	Matthew	Matthew	Matthew	Matthew	Christopher	Jacob	Matthew	Matthew	Matthew
4	Joshua	Joshua	Joshua	Joshua	Joshua	Jacob	Christopher	Christopher	Joshua	Joshua
5	Daniel	Andrew	Andrew	Tyler	Tyler	Joshua	Joshua	Joshua	Christopher	Christopher
6	David	Daniel	Brandon	Brandon	Brandon	Nicholas	Nicholas	Nicholas	Nicholas	Nicholas
7	Andrew	James	Daniel	Daniel	Jacob	Tyler	Tyler	Brandon	Brandon	Andrew
8	James	David	Tyler	Nicholas	Daniel	Brandon	Brandon	Andrew	Tyler	Jacob
9	Justin	Joseph	James	Jacob	Nicholas	Daniel	Austin	Austin	Andrew	Tyler
10	Joseph	John	David	Andrew	Andrew	Austin	Andrew	Tyler	Austin	Daniel
Female
1	Jessica	Ashley	Ashley	Jessica	Jessica	Jessica	Emily	Emily	Emily	Emily
2	Ashley	Jessica	Jessica	Ashley	Ashley	Ashley	Jessica	Jessica	Hannah	Hannah
3	Brittany	Brittany	Amanda	Sarah	Emily	Emily	Ashley	Ashley	Samantha	Alexis
4	Amanda	Amanda	Brittany	Samantha	Samantha	Samantha	Sarah	Sarah	Ashley	Sarah
5	Samantha	Samantha	Sarah	Emily	Sarah	Sarah	Samantha	Hannah	Sarah	Samantha
6	Sarah	Sarah	Samantha	Brittany	Taylor	Taylor	Taylor	Samantha	Alexis	Ashley
7	Stephanie	Stephanie	Emily	Taylor	Brittany	Hannah	Hannah	Taylor	Taylor	Madison
8	Jennifer	Jennifer	Stephanie	Amanda	Amanda	Brittany	Alexis	Alexis	Jessica	Taylor
9	Elizabeth	Elizabeth	Elizabeth	Elizabeth	Elizabeth	Amanda	Rachel	Elizabeth	Madison	Jessica
10	Lauren	Emily	Megan	Stephanie	Megan	Elizabeth	Elizabeth	Madison	Elizabeth	Elizabeth
