= Kristall (disambiguation) =

Kristall is a Russian space station module.

Kristall may also refer to:

- Minsk Kristall, a Belarusan vodka producer
  - Minskaya Kristall, one of the above's brands
- Moscow Distillery Crystal, a.k.a. "Kristall"
- Kristall Ice Sports Palace, Saratov, Russia

== Russian sports teams ==
- BSC Kristall
- Kristall Berdsk
- Kristall Elektrostal
- Kristall Saratov
- FC Kristall Dyatkovo
- FC Kristall Sergach
- FC Kristall Smolensk

== Typefaces ==
- LL Kristall

== See also ==
- Kristal (disambiguation)
- Kristallen
