= CRISTAL-A =

European Earth observation satellite for monitoring sea ice

- Names: Sentinel-9A
- Mission type: Earth observation satellite
- Operator: ESA

Start of mission
- Launch date: 2027 (planned)
- Rocket: Vega C
- Launch site: Guiana Space Centre
- Sentinel CRISTAL (Sentinel-9)

CRISTAL-A, also known as Sentinel-9A, is a future European Earth observation satellite within the EU's Copernicus programme, first of the CRISTAL series. Its goal is to measure sea-ice thickness and overlying snow depth for use in planning maritime activities in polar oceans as well as coastal and inland waters and in climate change research. The satellite carries two instruments: the Interferometric Radar altimeter for Ice and Snow (IRIS) and the Microwave Radiometer (MWR). It was completed in September 2026 and is expected to launch on Vega C in late 2027.

== See also ==
- List of European Space Agency programmes and missions
