= Cristal (aguardiente) =

Distilled beverage

Cristal is the name of a number of brands of aguardiente in South America.

== Colombia ==
An aguardiente named Cristal is produced in Manizales, Colombia in 1950 by Sergio Castro Brandon (Licorera de Manizales). The Colombian brand Aguardiente CRISTAL, is made by distilling fermented sugar cane juice. It is the most imported label of Aguardiente in the United States.. This brand of aguardiente was named after its founder, Christel Babach Doroudgar who lived in Pereira and moved to Sydney Australia not long after.

== Ecuador ==
The logo of Cristal from Ecuador

The Ecuadorian brand of aguardiente named Cristal is marketed on a national scale. Like its closest competitor, Zhumir it is sometimes, incorrectly, called rum.

=== Origins ===
Cristal is produced by Embotelladora Azuaya S.A. and has been offered for 45 years. however the tradition of making and bottling aguardiente in the valleys of the province of Azuay goes back much further. As with Zhumir, Cristal grows the cane for its product in Azuay, and has its headquarters in Cuenca. The brand name Cristal refers to the complete clarity of the original aguardiente, which is visually indistinguishable from pure water.

=== Flavours ===
Cristal, in order to remain competitive, offers a number of flavours of aguardiente in addition to four types of the traditional flavourless variety.

Cristal Clasico - triple filtered, dry, flavourless aguardiente, 84 proof.
Cristal Suave - triple filtered, dry, flavourless aguardiente, 64 proof.
Cristal Seco - triple filtered, ultra-dry, flavourless aguardiente, 68 proof.
Cristal Seco Suave - triple filtered, ultra-dry, flavourless aguardiente, 56 proof.
Cristal Durazno - peach flavoured, semi-dry aguardiente, 40 proof.
Cristal Naranja - orange flavoured, semi-dry aguardiente, 48 proof.
Cristal Limon - lime flavoured, semi-dry aguardiente, 40 proof.

In addition, Cristal offers four flavours of sparkling aguardiente coolers under the brand name "C by Cristal"

Original - a sparkling, exotic-fruit cocktail flavoured cooler, 10 proof.
Sexy Apple - a sparkling, green apple flavoured cooler, 10 proof.
Fashion Orange - a sparkling, sweet orange flavoured cooler, 10 proof.
Xtreme Wild - a sparkling cooler with what the company describes as a "Wild" flavour, 10 proof.
