= Crystal (surname) =

Crystal (also spelt Chrystall) is a surname. Notable people with the surname include:

- Ben Crystal (born 1977), British actor, writer and producer
- Billy Crystal (born 1948), American comedian and actor
- David Crystal (born 1941), British linguist and author
- Lillian Chrystall (1926–2022), New Zealand architect
- Ralph Crystal, American psychologist, professor, and author
