= Krystal =

Krystal may refer to:

== People with the given name ==
- Krystal Ann Simpson (born 1982), American poet, fashion blogger, DJ, reality television personality, and musician
- Krystal Ball (born 1981), American political commentator and media host
- Krystal Barry, American winner of Miss New Hampshire USA
- Krystal Barter, Australian health activist, author, and founder of Pink Hope
- Krystal Blackwell (born 2002), Australian professional rugby league footballer
- Krystal Bodie (born 1990), Bahamian sprinter
- Krystal Davis, American session musician and background singer
- Krystal De Napoli, Indigenous Australian astrophysicist, science communicator, and co-author
- Krystal de Ramos (born 1997), American-born Filipino professional footballer
- Krystal Fernandez (born 1971), American sports journalist
- Krystal Forever, Venezuelan contestant on Drag Race España season 5
- Krystal Forgesson (born 1982), New Zealand field hockey player
- Krystal Forscutt (born 1986), Australian former model, reality television contestant, personal trainer, and waitress
- Disappearance of Krystal Fraser – Unsolved 2009 disappearance of 23-year-old from Victoria
- Krystal Gabel (born 1984), American cannabis rights activist, politician, and writer
- Krystal Garib, Canadian Broadway performer, singer, dancer, filmmaker, producer, choreographer, philanthropist, and educator
- Krystal Harris (born 1981), American singer-songwriter and pianist
- Krystal Joy Brown (born 1986), American actress
- Krystal Jung (born 1994), South Korean-American singer and actress
- Krystal Keith (born 1985), American country music singer
- Krystal Klear, Irish DJ and music producer
- Krystal LaPorte (born 1992), American voice actress and lawyer
- Krystal Lara (born 1998), Dominican-American competitive swimmer
- Krystal Lee, Jamaican politician
- Krystal Maddox, American criminal in the 1999 Kingwood robbery incidents
- Krystal Meadows, Canadian voice actress
- Krystal Mejes, Filipino actress
- Krystal Meyers, American Christian rock- and contemporary Christian singer, songwriter, and musician
- Krystal Miller (?–2019), Mexican-American victim of the LeBarón and Langford families massacre
- Krystal Murray (born 1993), New Zealand former rugby league player
- Krystal Niu or Red Panda (born 1970/1971), Chinese American acrobat
- Krystal Parker (born 1990), English-born Northern Irish footballer
- Krystal Reyes (born 1996), Filipina actress
- Krystal Rivers (born 1994), American volleyball player
- Krystal Rota (born 1985), New Zealand rugby league footballer
- Krystal Scott (born 1994), Australian former AFLW player
- Krystal Shaw (born 1994), Canadian Paralympic swimmer
- Krystal Sloley (born 2002), Jamaican sprinter
- Krystal Summers, American actress
- Krystal Sutherland (born 1990), Australian novelist
- Krystal Thomas (born 1989), American former WNBA player
- Krystal Tsosie, Native American Navajo geneticist and bioethicist
- Krystal Vee (born 1987), Thai actress, model, and producer
- Krystal Versace (born 2001), English drag queen
- Krystal Weir (born 1985), Australian sailor

== People with the surname ==
=== Male ===
- Andrew Krystal (?–2022), Canadian news reporter
- Arthur Krystal (born 1947), Swedish-born American essayist, editor, and screenwriter

=== Fictional characters ===
- Krystal, in the 1993 Japanese role-playing video game Dark Wizard
- Krystal (Star Fox), in the Star Fox video game series
- Krystal Bouchard, in the 2011 US thriller film Swamp Shark, played by Sophia Sinise
- Krystal Carey Chandler, in the US soap opera All My Children, played by Bobbie Eakes
- Krystal McCoy, in the Australian TV soap opera Neighbours, played by Freya Nielson

== Other ==
- Krystal (film)
- Krystal (album), by Matt Maltese
- Krystal (restaurant), one of the oldest fast-food chains in the United States, founded in 1932
- Krystal (company), a British web host

== See also ==
- Cristal (disambiguation)
- Crystal (disambiguation)
- Kristal (disambiguation)
- Kristol
