= Kootenay Central =

Provincial electoral district in British Columbia, Canada

British Columbia electoral district
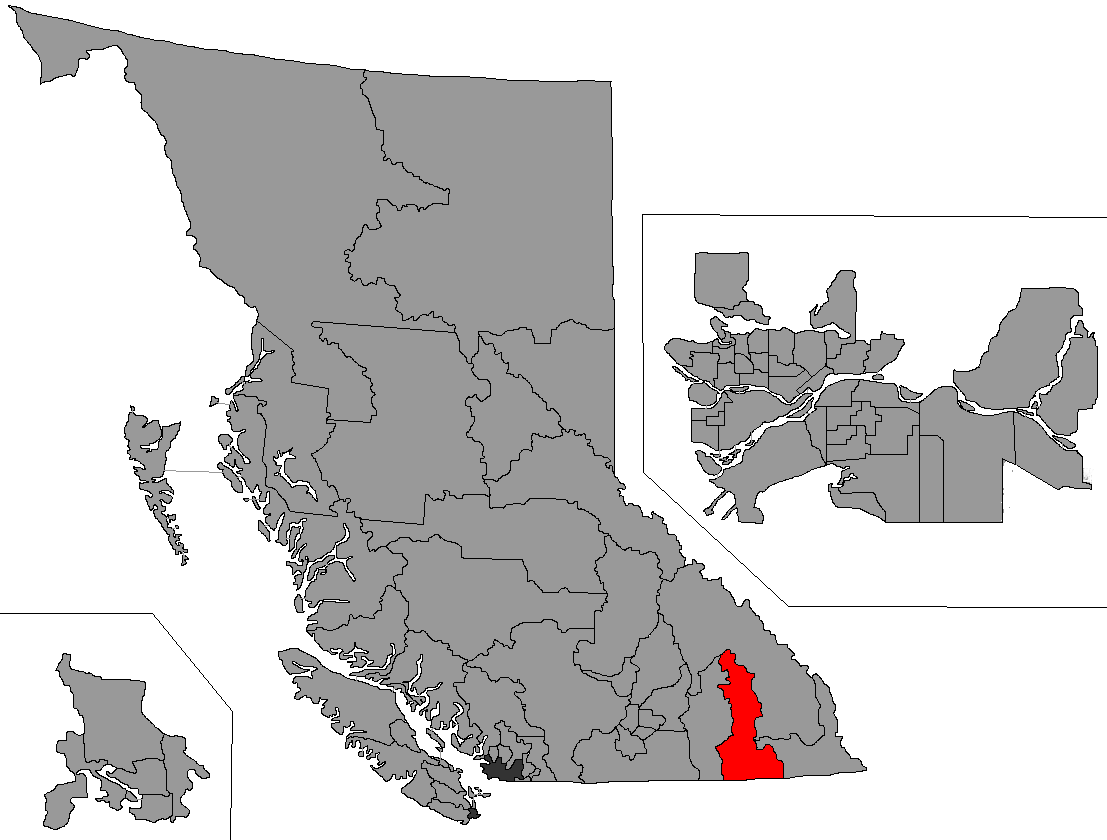

Provincial electoral district
- Legislature: Legislative Assembly of British Columbia
MLA
Brittny Anderson
New Democratic
- First contested: 1933
- Last contested: 2026

Demographics
- Population (2001): 44,131
- Area (km²): 21,795
- Pop. density (per km²): 2
- Census division: Regional District of Central Kootenay
- Census subdivision(s): Ainsworth Hot Springs, Creston, Kaslo, Nelson

Kootenay Central is a provincial electoral district for the Legislative Assembly of British Columbia, Canada.

It made its first appearance under the name Nelson-Creston in the general election of 1933 following a redistribution of the earlier Nelson and Creston ridings.

Historically, the riding was consistently held by the "free enterprise" party of the era. Until 1952, this alternated between the BC Liberals and the Coalition, while after the election in 1952, Social Credit won every election until the BC NDP victory in 1972.

Since 1972, the NDP has won all but two elections: in the 1986 election, Social Credit won the riding along with many others in the Interior and in 2001, prominent NDP Cabinet minister Corky Evans was defeated in an election that saw all but two NDP MLAs suffer defeat. Since the 2005 election, the NDP has won the riding by wide margins, although increasing Green Party support has cut into NDP margins, often producing the strongest Green results in Interior BC.

The riding adopted its current name and had minor boundary changes from the 2024 election, which implemented the results of the 2021 redistribution.

== Demographics ==
Population, 2001	44,131
Population change, 1996–2001	−2.2%
Area (km^{2})	21,795
Population density (people per km^{2})	2.0

== Geography ==
As of the 2024 provincial election, Kootenay Central comprises the eastern portion of the Regional District of Central Kootenay. It is located in southeastern British Columbia and is bordered by the United States to the south. Communities in the electoral district consist of Nelson, Creston, Salmo, and Kaslo.

== Members of the Legislative Assembly ==
Assembly	Years	Member	Party
Nelson-Creston; Riding created from Creston and Nelson
18th	1933–1937	Frank Putnam	Liberal
19th	1937–1941	Frank Putnam	Liberal
20th	1941–1945	Frank Putnam	Liberal
21st	1945–1949	Frank Putnam	Coalition
22nd	1949–1952	Walter Hendricks	Coalition
23rd	1952–1953	Wesley Drewett Black	Social Credit
24th	1953–1956	Wesley Drewett Black	Social Credit
25th	1956–1960	Wesley Drewett Black	Social Credit
26th	1960–1963	Wesley Drewett Black	Social Credit
27th	1963–1966	Wesley Drewett Black	Social Credit
28th	1966–1969	Wesley Drewett Black	Social Credit
29th	1969–1972	Wesley Drewett Black	Social Credit
30th	1972–1975	Lorne Nicolson	New Democratic
31st	1975–1979	Lorne Nicolson	New Democratic
32nd	1979–1983	Lorne Nicolson	New Democratic
33rd	1983–1986	Lorne Nicolson	New Democratic
34th	1986–1991	Howard Dirks	Social Credit
35th	1991–1996	Corky Evans	New Democratic
36th	1996–2001	Corky Evans	New Democratic
37th	2001–2005	Blair Suffredine	Liberal
38th	2005–2009	Corky Evans	New Democratic
39th	2009–2013	Michelle Mungall	New Democratic
40th	2013–2017	Michelle Mungall	New Democratic
41st	2017–2020	Michelle Mungall	New Democratic
42nd	2020–2024	Brittny Anderson	New Democratic
Kootenay Central
43rd	2024–2026	Brittny Anderson	New Democratic
44th	2026–present	Brittny Anderson	New Democratic

== Election results ==
=== Kootenay Central ===
2026 British Columbia general election
Party	Candidate	Votes	%	±%	Expenditures
New Democratic	Brittny Anderson	7,618	39.42	-0.21	
Conservative	Gordon Skulnec	7,151	37.00	+5.33	
Green	Nicole Charlwood	3,779	19.55	+0.81	
OneBC	Hunter Corrigal	730	3.78	-	
Total valid votes		19,278	99.75		
Total rejected ballots		49	0.25		
Turnout					
Registered voters					
New Democratic hold		Swing		-2.77	
Source: Elections BC

2024 British Columbia general election
Party	Candidate	Votes	%	±%	Expenditures
New Democratic	Brittny Anderson	8,716	39.63	-2.4	$45,585.69
Conservative	Kelly Vandenberghe	6,967	31.67	+30.9	$9,921.02
Green	Nicole Charlwood	4,123	18.74	-12.6	$68,360.13
Independent	Corinne Mori	2,190	9.96	–	$10,032.53
Total valid votes/expense limit		21,996	99.83	–	$71,700.08
Total rejected ballots		38	0.17	–	
Turnout		22,034	64.28	–	
Registered voters		34,278			
New Democratic notional hold		Swing		-16.6	
Source: Elections BC

2020 provincial election redistributed results
Party	%
New Democratic	42.0
Green	31.3
Liberal	23.7
Conservative	0.8
Others	2.2

=== Nelson-Creston ===
2020 British Columbia general election: Nelson-Creston
Party	Candidate	Votes	%	±%	Expenditures
New Democratic	Brittny Anderson	7,296	41.78	−0.41	$33,391.05
Green	Nicole Charlwood	5,611	32.13	+3.97	$41,086.42
Liberal	Tanya Finley	4,171	23.89	−4.04	$13,163.07
Libertarian	Terry Tiessen	384	2.20	–	$0.00
Total valid votes		17,462	100.00	–	
Total rejected ballots					
Turnout					
Registered voters					
Source: Elections BC

2017 British Columbia general election: Nelson-Creston
Party	Candidate	Votes	%	±%	Expenditures
New Democratic	Michelle Mungall	7,685	42.19	−8.54	$26,935
Green	Kim Charlesworth	5,130	28.16	+7.21	$7,119
Liberal	Tanya Rae Wall	5,087	27.93	−0.39	$51,781
Independent	Jesse O'Leary	164	0.90	–	$1,332
Independent	Tom Prior	149	0.82	–	$402
Total valid votes		18,215	100.00		
Total rejected ballots		67	0.37		
Turnout		18,282	64.20		
Source: Elections BC

2013 British Columbia general election: Nelson-Creston
Party	Candidate	Votes	%	±%	Expenditures
New Democratic	Michelle Mungall	8,200	50.73	-4.68	$58,838
Liberal	Greg Garbula	4,577	28.32	-2.12	$47,428
Green	Sjeng Derkx	3,387	20.95	+13.81	$18,928
Total valid votes		16,164	100.00		
Total rejected ballots		122	0.75		
Turnout		16,286	57.63		
Source: Elections BC

BC General Election 2009: Nelson-Creston
Party	Candidate	Votes	%	±	Expenditures
NDP	Michelle Mungall	9,060	55.83%	−3.97	$52,366
Liberal	Josh Smienk	5,191	31.42%	+4.69	$77,586
Green	Sean Kubara	1,189	7.20%	−5.22	$3,800
Conservative	David Duncan	1,083	6.55%	+6.55	$2,676
Total valid votes		16,523	100%		
Total rejected ballots		98	0.6%		
Turnout		16,621	60%		

BC General Election 2005: Nelson-Creston
Party	Candidate	Votes	%	±	Expenditures
NDP	Corky Evans	12,896	58.80%	+26.98	$59,942
Liberal	Blair Suffredine	5,862	26.73%	−12.27	$52,434
Green	Luke Crawford	2,724	12.42%	−9.11	$10,212
Marijuana	Philip McMillan	276	1.26%	–	$100
Bloc	Brian Taylor	173	–	0.79%	$215
Total valid votes		21,931			
Total rejected ballots		137	0.62%		
Turnout		22,068	67.88%		

BC General Election 2001: Nelson-Creston
Party	Candidate	Votes	%	±	Expenditures
Liberal	Blair Suffredine	8,558	39.00%	+7.53	$53,478
NDP	Corky Evans	6,981	31.82%	−13.08	$46,070
Green	Colleen McCrory	4,723	21.53%	+10.37	$33,223
Unity	Stephen Cox	1,108	5.05%		$3,216
Marijuana	Dan Loehndorf	570	2.60%		$1,400
Total valid votes		21,940	100.00%		
Total rejected ballots		79	0.36%		
Turnout		22,019	75.32%		

BC General Election 1996: Nelson-Creston
Party	Candidate	Votes	%	±	Expenditures
NDP	Corky Evans	9,179	44.90%	−2.01	$42,880
Liberal	Howard Dirks	6,434	31.47%	+12.29	$41,078
Green	Andy Shadrack	2,282	11.16%	+8.61	$18,611
Reform	Brian Dale Gaschnitz	2,114	10.34%		
Family Coalition	Brian John Zacharias	360	1.76%	–	$4,489
Natural Law	Ruth Anne Taves	73	0.36%		$398
Total valid votes		20,442	100.00%		
Total rejected ballots		82	0.40%		
Turnout		20,524	75.20%		

BC General Election 1991: Nelson-Creston
Party	Candidate	Votes	%	±	Expenditures
NDP	Corky Evans	8,583	46.91%		$33,620
Social Credit	Howard Dirks	5,739	31.36%	–	$52,253
Liberal	Barry L. Neufeld	3,510	19.18%		$863
Green	Andrea Wright	467	2.55%	–	$1,082
Total valid votes		18,299	100.00%		
Total rejected ballots		428	2.29%		
Turnout		18,727	80.60%		

28th BC General Election 1966: Nelson-Creston
Party	Candidate	Votes	%	±	Expenditures
Social Credit	Wesley Drewett Black	4683	59.3%	–	
NDP	Munro	2324	29.4%		
Liberal	A. M. M. Vogel	892	11.3%		
Total valid votes		7899	100.00%		
Total rejected ballots		91	1.1%		
Turnout		7990	69.2%		

27th BC General Election 1963: Nelson-Creston
Party	Candidate	Votes	%	±	Expenditures
Social Credit	Wesley Drewett Black	4047	44.6%	–	
NDP	Askevold	1943	21.4%		
Liberal	A. M. M. Vogel	1600	17.7%		
Progressive Conservative	Shorthouse	1474	16.3%		
Total valid votes		9064	100.00%		
Total rejected ballots		53	0.6%		
Turnout		9117	75.2%		

26th BC General Election 1960: Nelson-Creston
Party	Candidate	Votes	%	±	Expenditures
Social Credit	Wesley Drewett Black	4501	49.4%	–	
Co-operative Commonwealth Fed.	McNevin	2664	29.2%		
Liberal	Oliver	1222	13.4%		
Progressive Conservative	Taylor	730	8.0%		
Total valid votes		9117	100.00%		
Total rejected ballots		106	1.1%		
Turnout		9223	76.0%		

25th BC General Election 1956: Nelson-Creston
Party	Candidate	Votes	%	±	Expenditures
Social Credit	Wesley Drewett Black	4190	51.0%	–	
Co-operative Commonwealth Fed.	Affleck	2331	28.4%		
Liberal	White	1622	19.7%		
Labor-Progressive	Mountford	70	0.9%		
Total valid votes		8213	100.00%		
Total rejected ballots		86	1.0%		
Turnout		8299?	71.0%		

1953 British Columbia general election: Nelson-Creston
Party	Candidate	Votes 1st count	%	Votes final count	%
Social Credit	Wesley Drewett Black	3,450	39.4	4,199	55.2
Co-operative Commonwealth	Simms	2,636	30.1	3,404	44.8
Liberal	Tees	1,803	20.6		
Progressive Conservative	Shorthouse	772	8.8		
Labour Progressive	Mountford	99	1.1		
Total valid votes		8,760	100.00	7,603	100
Total rejected ballots		455			
Turnout		88.1			
Note: Preferential ballot. First and last counts only shown.

1952 British Columbia general election: Nelson-Creston
Party	Candidate	Votes 1st count	%	Votes final count	%
Social Credit	Wesley Drewett Black	2,975	33.8	4,265	56.0
Liberal	Walter Hendricks	2,572	29.2	3,351	44.0
Co-operative Commonwealth	Simms	2,473	28.1		
Progressive Conservative	Stibbs	774	8.8		
Total valid votes		8,794	100.00	7,616	100.00
Total rejected ballots		413	4.5		
Turnout		75.2			
Note: Preferential ballot. First and last counts only shown.

22nd BC General Election 1949: Nelson-Creston
Party	Candidate	Votes	%	±	Expenditures
Coalition	Walter Hendricks	4783	60.0%	–	
Co-operative Commonwealth Fed.	Drew	2675	33.6%		
Social Credit	Horne	508	6.4%	–	
Total valid votes		7966	100.00%		
Total rejected ballots		151	1.9%		
Turnout		8117	79.6%		

21st BC General Election 1945: Nelson-Creston
Party	Candidate	Votes	%	±	Expenditures
Coalition	Frank Putnam	3055	58.6%	–	
Co-operative Commonwealth Fed.	Phillips	1249	24.0%		
People's Co-operative Commonwealth	Peter Stuart Beatt	726	13.9%		
Independent	Frisby	184	3.5%		
Total valid votes		5214	100.00%		
Total rejected ballots		39	0.7%		
Turnout		5253	65.0%		

20th BC General Election 1941: Nelson-Creston
Party	Candidate	Votes	%	±	Expenditures
Liberal	Frank Putnam	2144	33.5%		
Conservative	Donaldson	2140	33.4%		
Co-operative Commonwealth Fed.	Frisby	2124	33.1%		
Total valid votes		6408	100.00%		
Total rejected ballots		89	1.4%		
Turnout		6497	76.9%		

19th BC General Election 1937: Nelson-Creston
Party	Candidate	Votes	%	±	Expenditures
Liberal	Frank Putnam	2149	39.2%		
Conservative	Horswill	1901	34.6%		
Co-operative Commonwealth Fed.	Bayliss	1121	20.4%		
Social Credit	Howe	177	3.2%	–	
Independent	Mulholland	139	2.5%		
Total valid votes		5487	100.00%		
Total rejected ballots		61	1.1%		
Turnout		5548	74.5%		

18th BC General Election 1933: Nelson-Creston
Party	Candidate	Votes	%	±	Expenditures
Liberal	Frank Putnam	2489	49.2%		
Non-Partisan Independent Group	Fred W. Lister	1302	25.7%		
Co-operative Commonwealth Fed.	Walley	1161	22.9%		
United Front (Workers and Farmers)	Mountford	108	2.1%		
Total valid votes		5060	100.00%		
Total rejected ballots		102	2.0%		
Turnout		5162	74.0%		

== See also ==
- List of electoral districts in the Kootenays
- List of British Columbia provincial electoral districts
- Canadian provincial electoral districts
