= Michelle Mungall =

Canadian politician

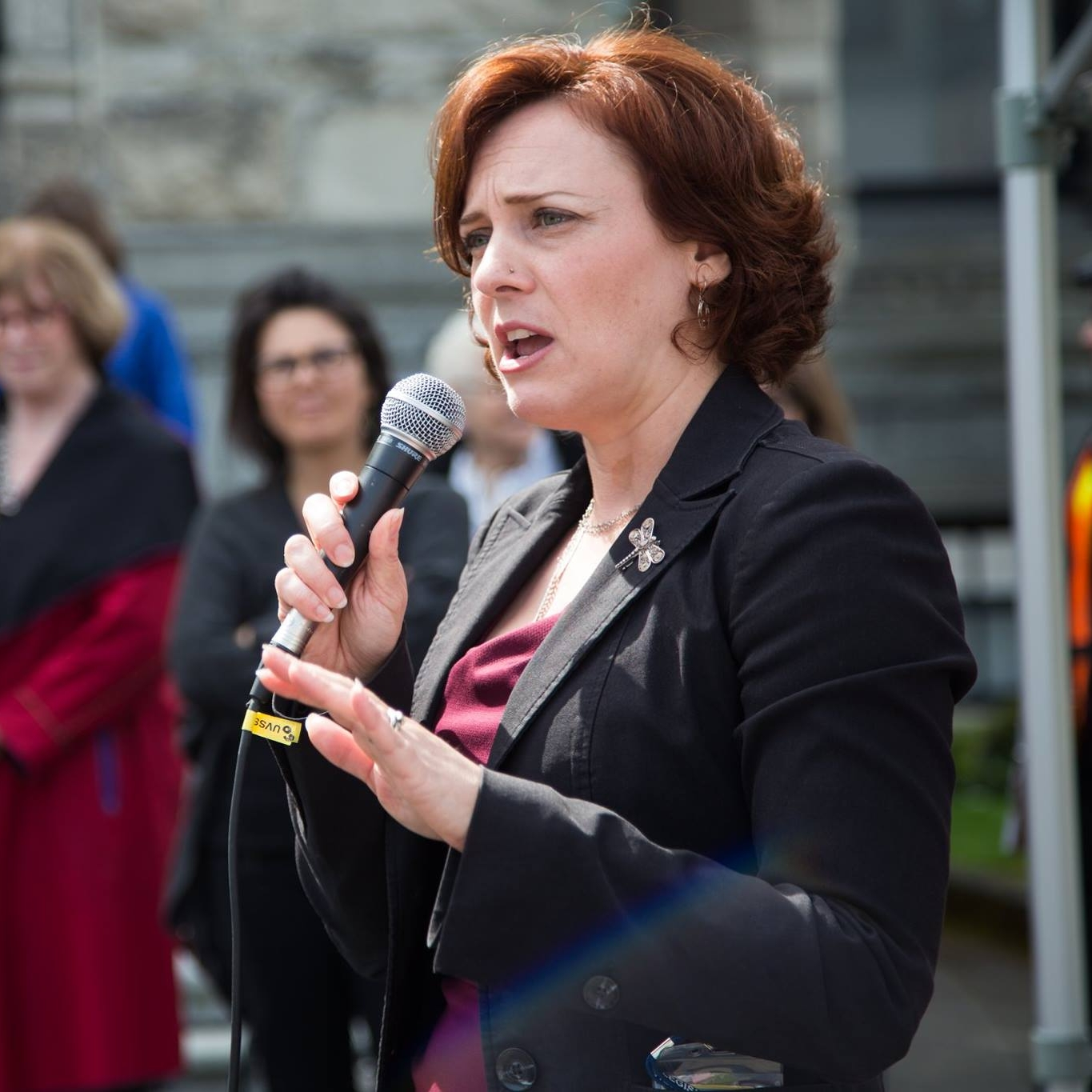
- Mungall speaking at Rally April 2016

Minister of Jobs, Economic Development and Competitiveness of British Columbia
- In office January 22, 2020 – November 26, 2020
- Premier: John Horgan
- Preceded by: Bruce Ralston
- Succeeded by: Ravi Kahlon

Minister of Energy, Mines, and Petroleum Resources of British Columbia
- In office July 18, 2017 – January 22, 2020
- Premier: John Horgan
- Preceded by: Rich Coleman
- Succeeded by: Bruce Ralston

Member of the British Columbia Legislative Assembly for Nelson-Creston
- In office May 12, 2009 – October 24, 2020
- Preceded by: Corky Evans
- Succeeded by: Brittny Anderson

Personal details
- Born: 1977 or 1978 (age 47–48) St. Albert, Alberta
- Party: New Democrat
- Spouse: Zak Matieschyn (m. 2011)
- Children: 1
- Education: University of Alberta; Royal Roads University

Michelle Mungall is a Canadian politician, who represented the Nelson-Creston electoral district Legislative Assembly of British Columbia from 2009 to 2020. She is a member of the British Columbia New Democratic Party (BC NDP) and was first elected as a Member of the Legislative Assembly in the 2009 election and re-elected in the 2013 and 2017 elections. During the 41st Parliament (2017-2020) she served in the Executive Council as the Minister for Energy, Mines and Petroleum Resources, and for several months in 2020 as the Minister of Jobs, Economic Development and Competitiveness. In the ministerial role she led the government through adopting the Zero- Emission Vehicles Act to require that by the year 2040 all new light-duty vehicle sales in BC must be zero-emission vehicles. She also led the government through amending several energy, mines and petroleum resource-related acts, including implementing recommendations from a comprehensive review of BC Hydro.

As a member of the official opposition in the 39th and 40th Parliaments she served in various critic and deputy roles at different times, such as on issues relating to social development, advanced education, skills training, and youth. She introduced two private member bills: Poverty Reduction and Economic Inclusion Act which would have required the government development a poverty reduction strategy, and amendments to the Private Career Training Institutions Act to bring supervision of English as a foreign or second language schools under that act.

Prior to her three terms in provincial politics, she served a term on Nelson City Council from 2002 to 2005. Mungall was the youngest person to serve on Nelson City Council.

== Background ==
Michelle Mungall was born and raised in St. Albert, Alberta. She graduated from Paul Kane High School and then attended the University of Alberta in Edmonton, graduating with a Bachelor of Arts (Honours) in Political Science in 2001.

During her final year of university, she became the Alberta New Democratic Party candidate in the St. Albert riding during the 2001 Alberta general election. Mungall was an underdog, with the race expected to be close between the incumbent Progressive Conservative Mary O'Neill and the Liberal challenger Len Bracko. Also in 2001 she worked as a youth organizer for the Northern Alberta Alliance on Race Relations and was profiled in the Edmonton Journal as one of Alberta's 30 most-promising people under 30 years old.

In 2001 Mungall re-located to Nelson, British Columbia. She quickly integrated into the community and ran for city council in the November 2002 election. She was identified as a wildcard in the race, not expected to win because of her inexperience and being new to Nelson, but expected to do well as she ran a very strong campaign. She finished third, gaining her one of the six council seats. At 24, she was the youngest councillor in the city's history, and one of the youngest female politicians in the country at the time. From 2003 to 2005, Mungall also worked at the Nelson Food Cupboard.

She opted not to stand for re-election in the 2005 municipal election, citing a desire to further her education. Following this, she worked as a community developer with the Nelson Committee On Homelessness before travelling to Africa to spend seven months as an intern in Lusaka, Zambia working as a National Programmes Assistant for the Zambia YWCA. Upon her return, she began studying her Master's in Royal Roads University's Human Security and Peacebuilding program.

She returned to Nelson in 2007 and worked first at the Nelson and District Youth Employment Resources Center, then at a microfinance organization called the Circle of Habondia Lending Society, then once again for the Nelson Committee on Homelessness. At the same time, she was writing her Master's thesis regarding homelessness in rural British Columbia. She submitted her dissertation in March 2009 and was awarded a Master of Arts degree by Royal Roads University.

Mungall married Zak Matieschyn on July 23, 2011, in Kokanee Creek Provincial Park. She gave birth to her son Zavier July 21, 2018.

== Provincial politics ==
In 2008, after Nelson-Creston Member of the Legislative Assembly Corky Evans announced he would not seek re-election, Mungall entered the race for the BC NDP nomination. Three other women contested the nomination: fellow Nelson residents Kim Adamson and Bev LaPointe, as well as Creston small business owner Rhonda Barter. The nomination vote was held in February 2009. In the preferential vote Lapointe and Barter were eliminated in the first two rounds and in the third round Mungall narrowly defeated Adamson.

Campaigning for the 2009 election began soon afterwards. She faced three other candidates, but only the BC Liberal candidate, long time rural director at the Regional District of Central Kootenay and former chair of the Columbia Basin Trust Josh Smienk was considered to be a serious challenger to Mungall. The other candidates, Sean Kubara of Kaslo running for the Green Party and David Duncan of the BC Conservative Party ran limited or no campaigns. Mungall's campaign focused on issues surrounding the local economy, independent power producers, and health care. She took 54% of the vote and won the riding, but her New Democratic Party lost provincially to the BC Liberals who formed a majority government.

=== 39th Parliament (2009-2013) ===
In the 39th Parliament, with the New Democrats as the Official Opposition, party leader Carole James assigned Mungall the role of deputy critic to Dawn Black on Advanced Education, where Moira Stilwell was the minister. As deputy critic, she spoke out against the June–July 2009 cuts to student aid programs and supported the student union of Selkirk College during a Halloween 2009 public event to highlight student loan problems.

In 2009, Mungall along with her BCNDP colleagues, community groups and city councillors, put the pressure on the Liberals to back down from planned cuts to funding for programs for survivors of domestic violence. "Literally minutes before Mungall was to speak at a Tuesday news conference, Heed's office dropped a press release saying the government was backing away from the $440,00 cut to programs for family-violence victims - mainly battered, abused and fearful women and children."

On local issues, Mungall hosted a public meeting on the controversial Glacier-Howser hydroelectric project which was undergoing environmental assessment, which she would later oppose, she delivered a 3,000 signature petition to the legislature advocating for improvements to the Kootenay Lake Hospital and hired an intern from the University of British Columbia to research food security in the Kootenays. Mungall was a vocal opponent to the proposed Jumbo Glacier Ski Resort and together with her BCNDP colleagues questioned the government on their creation of a town with no population.

She was selected for the Select Standing Committee on Finance and Government Services in the first and second sessions which engaged in budget consultations across the province. She also spent time as chair of the NDP's Women's Caucus which monitored women's issues In December 2009-January 2010, she and her husband visited Cambodia and participated (at the request of Mu Sochua) in training of local women who were preparing for an upcoming election

In the run-up to the 2011 BC NDP leadership election, Mungall supported Adrian Dix, who would eventually win the leadership post. As the third session of the 39th Parliament began, Dix appointed her critic for advanced education and for youth and was assigned to the Select Standing Committee on Education.

In November 2011, Mungall introduced her first piece of legislation, a private members bill entitled the Private Career Training Institutions Amendment Act. The bill would have required more rigorous reporting and complaint resolution requirements in private educational institutes and brought English as a foreign or second language schools under the Private Career and Training Institutions Act.

=== 40th Parliament (2013-2017) ===
In the 2013 election Mungall was re-elected MLA for Nelson-Creston. She received more votes than her opponents, the Liberal's Greg Garbula and Green's Sjeng Derkx combined. Following the election, Mungall was named Social Development Spokesperson in the official opposition shadow cabinet. She has also taken on the role of Opposition Deputy House Leader and from 2013 to 2014 was the Chair of the Opposition Social Policy Committee.

In 2014 Mungall championed a highly publicized and ultimately successful campaign to end the BC Government practice of clawing back child support payments from single parents receiving social assistance or disability payments. In response to the efforts of Mungall and anti-poverty advocates across the province, the BC government announced it was ending the child support clawback as a part of their February 2015 budget.

In 2015, Mungall successfully took on another Liberal clawback, this time one that took away EI maternity benefits from families on income assistance.

The 2016 Liberal budget included changes to the subsidized bus pass program for people with disabilities. It effectively increased the cost of a bus pass from $45 per year to $52 per month, a total of $624 per year. Mungall fought alongside advocates for people with disabilities to raise the rates and keep the bus pass program and the government responded. In June 2016 the government announced it would remove the $45 annual fee for a disability bus pass and the 2017 budget included a $50 per month increase in disability rates. Mungall publicly noted that the increase was approximately the same as the previous years increase in cost for the disability bus pass.

Through the 40th Parliament, Mungall continued to speak out against the development of the Jumbo Glacier ski resort. In a 2014 Vancouver Sun article she states "I think they just need to end this farce and acknowledge that it hasn’t been substantially started. It’s nothing but a concrete slab. It’s very close if not in an avalanche path. It’s not safe and nobody in the region wants it. End it." Mungall presented a petition with 61,526 signatures to keep Jumbo wild in the BC Legislature in March 2017.

In May 2014 she introduced a private members bill, the Poverty Reduction and Economic Inclusion Act (Bill M-212). The bill aimed to target the root causes of poverty and mandate the development of a comprehensive poverty reduction strategy. Mungall and her colleagues have introduced this legislation six times, and each time it died on the order paper and did not make it to second reading. However, a version of the bill would later be adopted in 2019 during the 41st Parliament.

=== 41st Parliament (2017-2020) ===
Mungall sought re-election again in the 2017 election against Kim Charlesworth of the BC Green Party and Tanya Rae Wall of the BC Liberal Party. Mungall was again re-elected with her party forming the Official Opposition, but this time in a BC Liberal minority government. However, in the first session of the 41st Parliament the BC Liberal government lost a confidence vote and the second session began with the BC NDP forming a minority government. In July 2017, Premier John Horgan appointed Mungall to the Executive Council of British Columbia as the Minister of Energy, Mines, and Petroleum Resources. In that role, she led the government in adopting numerous legislative amendments. The Energy, Mines and Petroleum Resources Statutes Amendment Act, 2018 to address the rise in orphan wells and bankruptcies in the oil and gas sector; and the Oil and Gas Activities Amendment Act, 2018 to implement an equivalency agreement with the federal government regarding upstream methane regulations; the Energy Statutes Amendment Act, 2019 to implement the results of a comprehensive review of BC Hydro and re-instate the BC Utilities Commission's authority over BC Hydro 20 year electricity supply and demand projections; and the Zero-Emission Vehicles Act to mandate that all new light-duty vehicle sales in BC must be zero-emissions vehicles by the year 2040.

In February 2018, as the Minister responsible for mining, Mungall established a BC Mining Jobs Task Force to review exploration and mining in BC to find ways to strengthen the mining industry. The task force delivered its recommendations to Mungall in December and implemented over the next few years. Regarding the Site C dam, while Mungall had campaigned against its development, as Minister she reversed positions and helped facilitate its construction.

Also during this time, her and her husband had a baby. Mungall became the fourth MLA to give birth while in office and second Cabinet minister. In response, Legislative Assembly voted unanimously on March 8, 2018, International Women's Day, to change the Standing Rules of Order to allow infants under two years of age on the floor of the Legislative Assembly while in the care of their parents. Mungall's son was then the first baby on the floor of the legislature when Mungall introduced him October 16, 2018 to the House. In January 2020, Premier Horgan switched Mungall's and Bruce Ralston's ministerial roles, making Mungall the Minister of Jobs, Economic Development and Competitiveness. In September 2020, amid speculation of a snap election, Mungall announced that she would not be seeking re-election. In the subsequent October election, the NDP retained the Nelson-Creston seat with Brittny Anderson winning the riding.

== Electoral history ==
2017 British Columbia general election: Nelson-Creston
Party	Candidate	Votes	%	±%	Expenditures
New Democratic	Michelle Mungall	7,685	42.19	−8.54	$26,935
Green	Kim Charlesworth	5,130	28.16	+7.21	$7,119
Liberal	Tanya Rae Wall	5,087	27.93	−0.39	$51,781
Independent	Jesse O'Leary	164	0.90	–	$1,332
Independent	Tom Prior	149	0.82	–	$402
Total valid votes		18,215	100.00		
Total rejected ballots		67	0.37		
Turnout		18,282	64.20		
Source: Elections BC

2013 British Columbia general election: Nelson-Creston
Party	Candidate	Votes	%	±%	Expenditures
New Democratic	Michelle Mungall	8,200	50.73	-4.68	$58,838
Liberal	Greg Garbula	4,577	28.32	-2.12	$47,428
Green	Sjeng Derkx	3,387	20.95	+13.81	$18,928
Total valid votes		16,164	100.00		
Total rejected ballots		122	0.75		
Turnout		16,286	57.63		
Source: Elections BC

B.C. General Election 2009: Nelson-Creston
Party	Candidate	Votes	%	±	Expenditures
New Democratic	Michelle Mungall	9,060	55%	n/a	$52,366
Liberal	Josh Smienk	5,191	31%	n/a	$77,586
Green	Sean Kubara	1,189	7%	n/a	$3,800
Conservative	David Duncan	1,083	7%	n/a	$2,676
Total Valid Votes		16,523	100%		
Total Rejected Ballots		98	0.6%		
Turnout		16,621	60%		

Alberta General Election 2001: St. Albert
Party	Candidate	Votes	%	±	Expenditures
Progressive Conservative	Mary O'Neill	9,537	53%	n/a	$79,601
Liberal	Len Bracko	7,479	41%	n/a	$19,522
New Democratic	Michelle Mungall	1,122	6%	n/a	$2,512
Total Valid Votes		18,138	100%		
Total Rejected Ballots		63	0.3%		
Turnout		18,201	64%		
