= Lorne Nicolson =

Canadian politician (1936–2021)

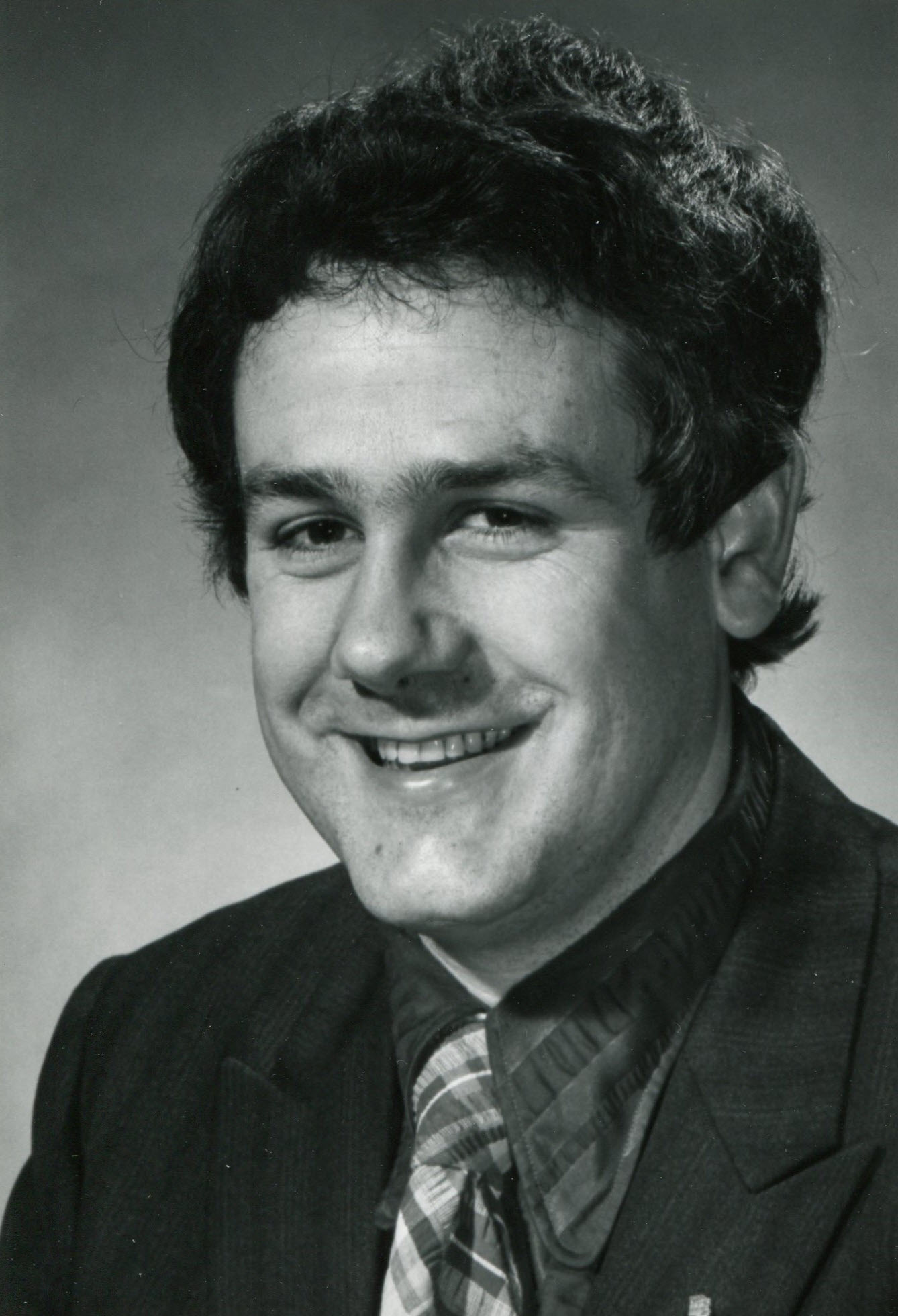

Member of the British Columbia Legislative Assembly for Nelson-Creston
- In office August 30, 1972 – October 22, 1986
- Preceded by: Wesley Drewett Black
- Succeeded by: Howard Dirks

Personal details
- Born: July 4, 1936 Vancouver, British Columbia
- Died: February 26, 2021 (aged 84)
- Party: New Democratic
- Profession: Teacher

Lorne James Nicolson (July 4, 1936 – February 26, 2021) was a Canadian educator and political figure in British Columbia. Defeated in the 1969 provincial election, he represented Nelson-Creston in the Legislative Assembly of British Columbia from 1972 to 1986 as a New Democratic Party (NDP) member.

Lorne Nicolson was born in Vancouver, British Columbia, and is the son of James Thomas Nicolson and Rosa Maria Cristiano. He studied at the University of British Columbia. In 1958, Nicolson married Frances Golata. He served in the provincial cabinet as a minister without portfolio and as Minister of Housing.

== Death ==
Nicolson died on February 26, 2021, at the age of 84.
