= Blair Suffredine =

Canadian politician

MLA for Nelson-Creston
- In office 2001–2005
- Preceded by: Corky Evans
- Succeeded by: Corky Evans

Personal details
- Born: 1951 (age 74–75) Saskatoon, Saskatchewan
- Party: Liberal
- Occupation: lawyer

Blair Suffredine is a Canadian politician. He served as a BC Liberal Member of the Legislative Assembly of British Columbia, representing the riding of Nelson-Creston from 2001 until his defeat in the 2005 provincial election.

On May 24, 2010, Suffredine was a passenger in a small plane that crashed in Kootenay Lake. He was unharmed.

Suffredine was counsel for the defence in the 2017 trial of fundamentalist Mormon leader Winston Blackmore for polygamy.
