= Corky Evans =

Canadian politician (born 1948)

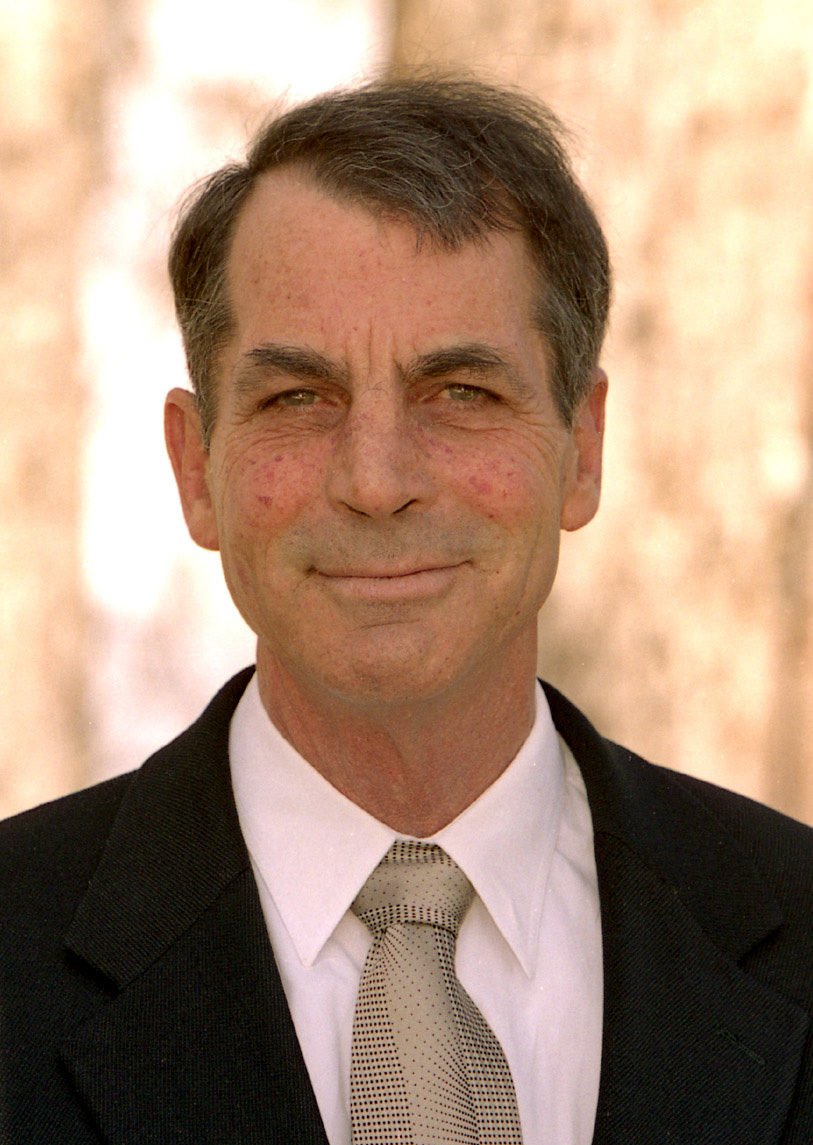

Member of the British Columbia Legislative Assembly for Nelson-Creston
- In office May 17, 2005 – May 12, 2009
- Preceded by: Blair Suffredine
- Succeeded by: Michelle Mungall
- In office October 17, 1991 – May 16, 2001
- Preceded by: Howard Dirks
- Succeeded by: Blair Suffredine

Personal details
- Born: January 2, 1948 (age 78) Berkeley, California, USA
- Party: British Columbia New Democratic Party
- Occupation: Farmer

Corky Evans (born January 2, 1948) is a former Canadian provincial politician in British Columbia, Canada. He twice ran for the leadership of the New Democratic Party of British Columbia, placing second both times. In both cases, the party formed the government of British Columbia and its leader became Premier of British Columbia. He served in several cabinet ministries.

== Early life and career ==
While his birth certificate recorded his name as Conrad St. George Evans, he insists Corky Evans is his correct name.

Born in California the son of a prominent defense attorney and a graduate of Palo Verde High School in Tucson, Arizona, he moved to British Columbia in 1969 with his wife and two daughters. Evans describes himself as a war resister. Their son was born soon after. Before his election to the Legislative Assembly of British Columbia, Evans worked as a stevedore, logger, tree-planter, heavy-equipment operator, first-aid attendant, and highways surveyor. By the mid-1970s, Evans had settled in the Kootenay region of southern British Columbia, and became active in local environmental and land use initiatives, particularly in developing the Slocan Valley Forest Management Project, which aimed to control logging and protect watersheds.

In 1975, he became a Canadian citizen and he joined the New Democratic Party. He was elected to the Central Kootenay Regional District government, serving three consecutive terms as a director and hospital board member.

== In provincial politics ==
After one unsuccessful run for the provincial legislature for the BC NDP in the 1986 provincial election, he was elected Member of the Legislative Assembly for Nelson-Creston in the 1991 provincial election. He served as parliamentary secretary to the Minister of Forests and chair of the legislature's Select Standing Committee on Forests, Mines and Petroleum Resources.

His first run in a BC NDP leadership convention came in 1996, when Glen Clark was very widely assumed to be a shoo-in for the leadership. Evans' folksy candidacy earned him a second-place finish, and he encouraged his supporters to rally around Clark.

In Clark's cabinet, Evans became Minister of Transportation and Highways from February 1996 to June 1996. Evans and the Clark NDP government were re-elected in the 1996 general election on May 28. In June, Evans was named Minister of Agriculture, Fisheries and Food; fisheries was spun off into a separate portfolio in February.

Evans retained his position as Minister of Agriculture and Food when Dan Miller served as premier on an interim basis in 1999–2000.

In the leadership convention of February 20, 2000, Evans placed a strong second to Ujjal Dosanjh, who had been the frontrunner throughout the race. Dosanjh returned Fisheries, a high-profile responsibility at the time, to Evans' portfolio. Evans had campaigned for a Ministry of Rural Development, and Dosanjh additionally named him Minister Responsible for Rural Development and empowered him to organize such a ministry.

In a cabinet shuffle of November 1, 2000, Evans left his previous portfolios to become Minister of Health and Minister Responsible for Seniors.

== Defeat and return ==
Evans was defeated in his riding in the 2001 provincial election when all but two NDP candidates were defeated.

He was approached to run in the 2003 BC NDP leadership convention, but declined, citing his commitment to his new job with a local community service organization.

He returned to politics as the MLA for Nelson-Creston on May 17, 2005, when he won his riding in the provincial election.

On July 3, 2008, Evans announced that he would not stand for re-election in the 2009 provincial election.

British Columbia provincial government of Ujjal Dosanjh
Cabinet posts (5)
Predecessor	Office	Successor
Mike Farnworth	Minister of Health; November 1, 2000–June 5, 2001	Sindi Hawkins; Colin Hansen
Mike Farnworth	Minister Responsible for Seniors; November 1, 2000–June 5, 2001	Ministry Abolished
Dennis Streifel	Minister of Fisheries; February 29, 2000–November 1, 2000	Ed Conroy
cont'd from Miller Ministry	Minister of Agriculture and Food; February 29, 2000–November 1, 2000	Ed Conroy
Ministry Established	Minister Responsible for Rural Development; February 29, 2000–November 1, 2000	Ed Conroy
British Columbia provincial government of Dan Miller
Cabinet post (1)
Predecessor	Office	Successor
cont'd from Clark Ministry	Minister of Agriculture and Food; August 25, 1999–February 24, 2000	cont'd into Dosanjh Ministry
British Columbia provincial government of Glen Clark
Cabinet posts (3)
Predecessor	Office	Successor
David Zirnhelt	Minister of Agriculture and Food; June 17, 1996–August 25, 1999	cont'd into Miller Ministry
David Zirnhelt	Minister of Fisheries; June 17, 1996–February 18, 1998	Dennis Streifel
Jackie Pement	Minister of Transportation and Highways; February 28, 1996–June 17, 1996	Lois Boone
