= Chrystall =

Chrystall is a surname. Notable people with this surname include:

- Belle Chrystall (1910–2003), British actress
- Lillian Chrystall (1926–2022), New Zealand architect

== Other ==
- Chrystalls Beach, north of Toko Mouth, Otago, New Zealand

== See also ==
- Chrystal
