= Britney (disambiguation) =

Britney may refer to:

- Britney (album), a 2001 album by Britney Spears
- "Britney" (song), a 2008 song by Bebo Norman
- "Britney", a song by Busted from the album Busted, 2002
- Britney (name), a list of people with the given name

== See also ==
- Brittany (disambiguation)
- Brit (disambiguation)
