= SS Bretagne =

A number of steamships have carried the name Bretagne

- SS La Bretagne, an 1886 ocean liner for Compagnie Générale Transatlantique (CGT)
- SS Bretagne (1908), 1,326 GRT, built by Helsingørs Jernskib-og Maskinbyggeri A/S
- SS Bretagne (1922), 10,103 GRT, built by Barclay, Curle for CGT
- SS Bretagne (1928), 3,177 GRT, built by Burmeister & Wain for Danske-Fransch Dampskibs
- SS Bretagne (1937), 3,285 grt, built by Akers Mekaniske Verksted for F Olsen & Co
- SS Bretagne (1951), a 1951 ocean liner for Société Générale de Transport Maritimes

== See also ==
- French ship Bretagne
