= CRISTAL (Sentinel-9) =

Series of European Earth observation satellites for monitoring sea ice

- Manufacturer: Airbus
- Country of origin: European Union
- Operator: European Space Agency
- Applications: Sea ice monitoring

Production
- Planned: 2
- Launched: 0
- Maiden launch: 2027 (planned)

Related spacecraft
- Launch vehicle: Vega C

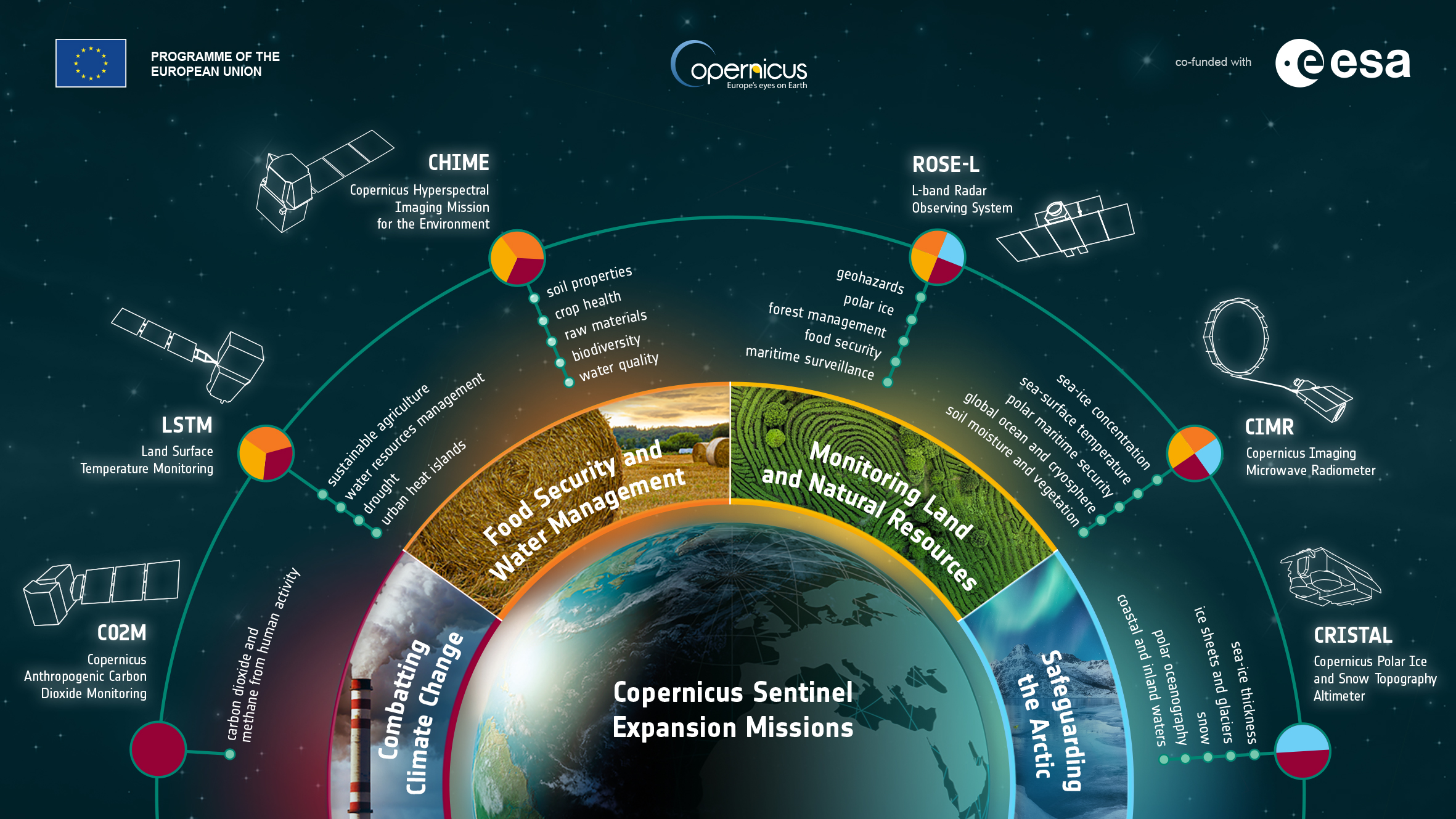
Copernicus Sentinel Expansion Missions

The Copernicus Polar Ice and Snow Topography Altimeter (CRISTAL), also known as Sentinel-9, is a series of future European Earth observation satellites within the EU's Copernicus programme. It is expected to have its first launch (CRISTAL-A) in late 2027. Its goal is to measure sea-ice thickness and overlying snow depth for use in planning maritime activities in polar oceans as well as coastal and inland waters and in climate change research. The satellites carry two instruments: the Interferometric Radar altimeter for Ice and Snow (IRIS) and the Microwave Radiometer (MWR).

== See also ==
- List of European Space Agency programmes and missions
