= Cristal =

Cristal may refer to:

- Cristal Global, chemical company
- Cristal (wine), a brand of champagne
- Cristal (aguardiente), brands of aguardiente
- Cristal (1985), a Venezuelan telenovela
- CRISTAL (Sentinel-9), a series of future Earth observation satellites
- Cristal, Rio Grande do Sul, a city in Brazil
- MS Cristal, a cruise ship
- Clube Atlético Cristal, a Brazilian football club
- Cristal, a prize awarded at the Annecy International Animation Film Festival
- Cristal, the iliac crest in supracristal plane
- Bic Cristal, a brand of disposable ballpoint pens
- Cristal, a typeface by French foundry Deberny & Peignot
- Cristal (album), an album by Brazilian singer Simone Bittencourt de Oliveira
- Cerveza Cristal, a Chilean brand of pilsner beer
- Cristal e-College, a higher education institution in the Philippines

== People with the surname ==
- Linda Cristal (1931–2020), Argentine actress

== See also ==
- Crystal (disambiguation)
- Sporting Cristal, a Peruvian football team
