= Crystal Oldman =

British nursing leader and academic (fl. 2026)

Dame Crystal Oldman DBE CBE FRCN
- Education: Open University
- Occupations: Nursing leader; academic
- Employers: Buckinghamshire New University; Queen's Institute of Community Nursing
- Awards: Dame Commander of the Order of the British Empire (2026); Commander of the Order of the British Empire (2017); Fellow of the Royal College of Nursing (2020)

Dame Crystal Elizabeth Oldman DBE CBE FRCN is a British retired nursing leader and former academic.

== Early life and education ==
In 2013 Oldman earned a PhD from the Open University with a thesis entitled "The academic middle manager in higher education : perceptions and aspirations".

== Career ==
Oldman worked for the National Health Service for 18 years, mostly in community nursing in poor areas of West London. In 1994 she became a senior lecturer at Buckinghamshire New University, where she worked to develop new courses in community nursing. She spent 18 years at the university, and served as Dean of Enterprise and Business Management in the Faculty of Society and Health.

Oldman was chief executive of the Queen's Institute of Community Nursing (QICN; formerly the Queen's Nursing Institute) from 2012 until her retirement on 30 June 2025.

As of 2026 she is a trustee of the Nuffield Trust, having been appointed to the role in 2023. In February 2026 she was appointed a trustee of Pathway, a British charity concerned with health care for homeless and socially excluded people.

== Awards and recognition ==
Oldman was appointed a Commander of the Order of the British Empire (CBE) in the 2017 Birthday Honours "For services to the Queen’s Nursing Institute and Community Nursing", and a Dame Commander of the Order of the British Empire (DBE) in the 2026 Birthday Honours "For services to Nursing".

In 2020 she became a Fellow of the Royal College of Nursing.
