= Brittny Anderson =

Canadian politician

Brittny Anderson MLA
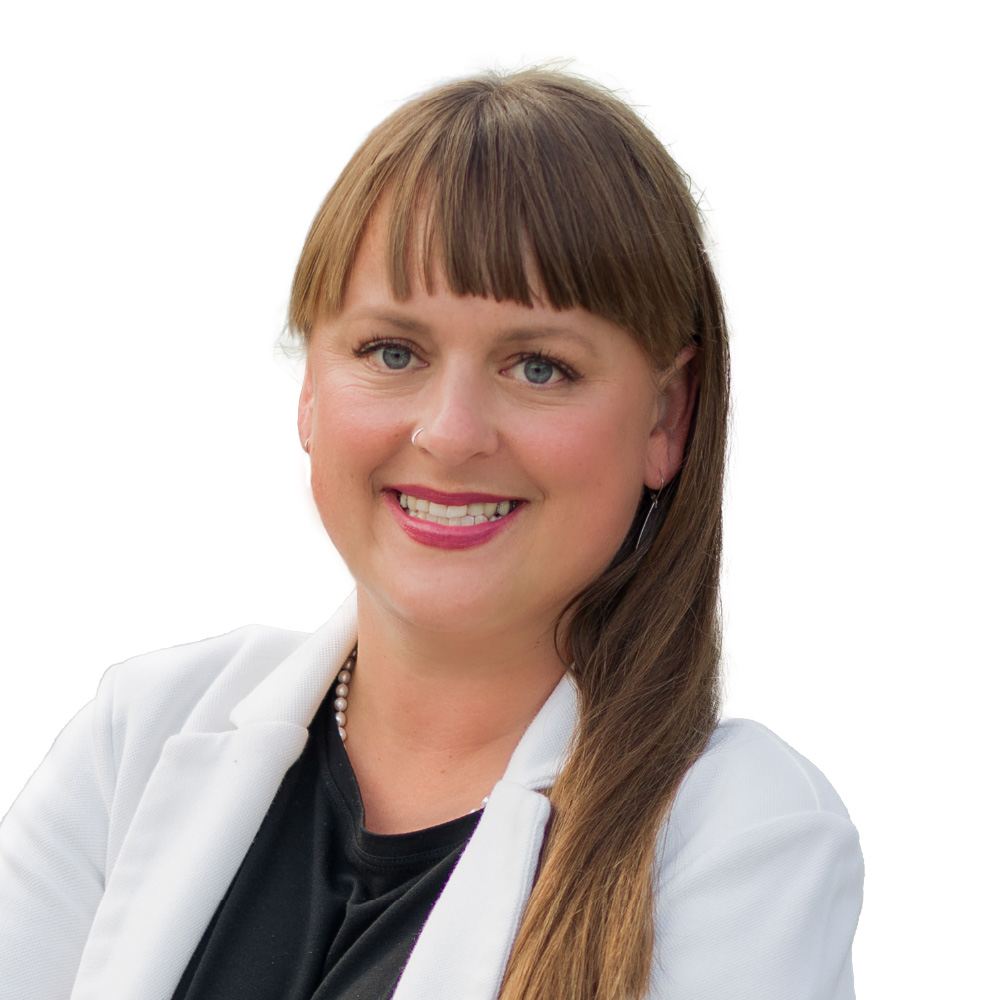
- Anderson in 2024

Minister of State for Local Governments and Rural Communities of British Columbia
- In office November 18, 2024 – November 20, 2026
- Premier: David Eby
- Preceded by: Position established

Parliamentary Secretary for Tourism and Premier’s Special Advisor on Youth of British Columbia
- In office December 7, 2022 – November 18, 2024
- Premier: David Eby
- Preceded by: Position established
- Succeeded by: Position abolished

Member of the British Columbia Legislative Assembly for Kootenay Central Nelson-Creston (2020–2024)
- Incumbent
- Assumed office October 24, 2020
- Preceded by: Michelle Mungall

Personal details
- Party: New Democratic
- Education: Selkirk College; UBC Okanagan (BA); CEU Budapest (MSc)

Brittny Anderson MLA is a Canadian politician who has served as a member of the Legislative Assembly of British Columbia (MLA) representing the electoral district of Kootenay Central since 2020. She is a member of the New Democratic Party.

Anderson was named the premier’s special advisor on youth on April 14, 2021 and the parliamentary secretary for tourism in December 2022. After the 2024 election, in which she was one of only four BC NDP MLAs elected in the Interior, she was appointed Minister of State for Local Governments and Rural Communities.

== Personal life and early career ==
Anderson grew up in Nelson, and spent some time abroad before settling down in the Kootenays. She studied at Selkirk College, received a Bachelors of Arts in International Relations from UBC Okanagan, and a Masters of Science in Environmental Science and Policy from the Central European University in Budapest.

She has previously worked for regional government and non-profits, as well as in the service and tourism sectors.

Anderson would be elected to Nelson city council in 2018, and served on the Board of the Regional District of Central Kootenay before being elected as an MLA in 2020.

== Electoral history ==
2026 British Columbia general election: Kootenay Central
Party	Candidate	Votes	%	±%	Expenditures
New Democratic	Brittny Anderson	8,196	39.71		
Conservative	Gordon Skulnec	7,531	36.48		
Green	Nicole Charlwood	4,089	19.81		
OneBC	Hunter Corrigal	772	3.74	—	
Total valid votes		20,588	99.74		
Total rejected ballots		54	0.26		
Turnout		20,642			
Registered voters					
New Democratic hold		Swing		−2.77	
Source: Elections BC

2024 British Columbia general election: Kootenay Central
Party	Candidate	Votes	%	±%	Expenditures
New Democratic	Brittny Anderson	8,716	39.63	-2.4	$45,585.69
Conservative	Kelly Vandenberghe	6,967	31.67	+30.9	$9,921.02
Green	Nicole Charlwood	4,123	18.74	-12.6	$68,360.13
Independent	Corinne Mori	2,190	9.96	–	$10,032.53
Total valid votes/expense limit		21,996	99.83	–	$71,700.08
Total rejected ballots		38	0.17	–	
Turnout		22,034	64.28	–	
Registered voters		34,278			
New Democratic notional hold		Swing		-16.6	
Source: Elections BC

2020 British Columbia general election: Nelson-Creston
Party	Candidate	Votes	%	±%	Expenditures
New Democratic	Brittny Anderson	7,296	41.78	−0.41	$33,391.05
Green	Nicole Charlwood	5,611	32.13	+3.97	$41,086.42
Liberal	Tanya Finley	4,171	23.89	−4.04	$13,163.07
Libertarian	Terry Tiessen	384	2.20	–	$0.00
Total valid votes		17,462	100.00	–	
Total rejected ballots					
Turnout					
Registered voters					
Source: Elections BC

=== 2018 Nelson City Council election ===
Top 6 candidates elected

Council Candidate	Vote	%
Richard Logtenberg	1,923	44.57
Brittny Anderson	1,862	43.15
Jesse Woodward	1,813	42.02
Calvin Renwick	1,765	40.90
Janice Morrison (X)	1,578	36.57
Keith Page	1,389	32.19
Rob Richichi	1,058	24.52
Robin Cherbo (X)	1,052	24.38
Margaret Stacey	1,049	24.31
Michelle Hillaby	1,037	24.03
Robbie Kalabis	1,031	23.89
Joseph Reiner	944	21.88
Robert Adams (X)	939	21.76
Brian Shields	912	21.14
Travis Hauck	864	20.02
Leslie Payne	819	18.98
Laureen Barker	712	16.50
Stephanie Wiggins	682	15.81
Charles Jeanes	254	5.89
