= Kristel =

Female given name and family name

Kristel is both a feminine given name and a surname. Notable people with the name include:

Given name:

- Kristel de Catalina (born 1985), Filipino dancer and actress
- Kristel Fulgar (born 1994), Filipino actress
- Kristel Köbrich (born 1985), Chilean swimmer
- Kristel Leesmend (born 1968), Estonian actress
- Kristel Lisberg (born 1989), Faroese singer
- Kristel Moreno (born 1991), Filipino actress and dancer
- Kristel Pärtna (born 1981), Estonian opera singer
- Kristel Verbeke (born 1975), Belgian singer
- Kristel Viigipuu (born 1990), Estonian biathlete
- Kristel Vourna (born 1992), Greek swimmer
- Kristel Werckx (born 1969), Belgian racing cyclist

Surname:

- Sylvia Kristel (1952−2012), Dutch actress, model and singer
