= Ralph Crystal =

American psychologist

Ralph M. Crystal is an American psychologist, professor and author, currently the Wallace Charles Hill Professor of Rehabilitation Education at University of Kentucky, and his books have been collected by libraries worldwide.
