= Zhumir =

Ecuadorian spirit brand

Zhumir Latin Spirit is an Ecuadorian brand of spirits, marketed on a national and international scale. Zhumir is often, incorrectly, referred to as Rum outside of Ecuador.

== Origins ==
Zhumir was originally founded by Don Eduardo Crespo Malo. The term "Zhumir" was coined in 1870 by Francesco Cabeza de Vaca to describe spirits, and the distillery has roots in Cuenca, where it was founded in 1966 by Doña Hortensia Mata Ordóñez as "Destilería La Playa." The name was changed in 1982 to "Destilería Zhumir C. Ltda" in order to more closely identify the company with its most popular product.

When Zhumir began, it was a cottage industry, bottling and selling spirits made in the traditional artesanal manner, however the product quickly became so popular that the company installed an industrial distillery to keep up with demand. Much of the sugarcane used to produce Zhumir is grown in company owned fields in the valley of Paute in the province of Azuay, and the corporation has its headquarters in the Azuay capital, Cuenca.

== Flavours ==
Zhumir's Neat Spirits

Zhumir Blender - triple-filtered, dry, flavourless spirit, 68 proof.
Zhumir Watermelon - semi-dry, Watermelon and Strawberry flavoured spirit, (Extremely popular among youngsters) 15 proof.
Zhumir Coco - semi-dry, coconut flavoured spirit, 42 proof.
Zhumir Maracuyá - semi-dry, passionfruit flavoured spirit, 42 proof.
Zhumir Durazno - semi-dry, peach flavoured spirit, 42 proof.
Zhumir Limón - semi-dry, lime flavoured spirit, 60 proof.
Zhumir Reposado - a fine, aged spirit similar to amber rum, 80 proof.
Zhumir Reserva Especial - a fine, aged spirit similar to dark rum, 80 proof. "Zhumir Naranjilla"

As well, the company offers blended spirit-based liqueurs

Piña Colada with Zhumir - a pre-mixed Pina Colada, 30 proof.
Tacao with Zhumir - a chocolate cream liqueur, 30 proof.
Rompope with Zhumir - a cinnamon and egg cream liqueur of flavour similar to eggnog, 32 proof.
