= SS Brittany =

Brittany was the name of a number of steamships.

- SS Brittany (1882), built for the London, Brighton and South Coast Railway
- SS Brittany (1898), built for D MacIver & Co
- SS Brittany (1910), built for the London, Brighton and South Coast Railway
- SS Brittany (1928), built for D MacIver & Co
- SS Brittany (1933), built for the Southern Railway
- SS Brittany (1952), built for the Société Générale des Transports Maritimes à Vapeur
