= French ship Bretagne =

Six of ships of the French Navy have been named in honour of the region of Brittany.

== Ships named Bretagne ==
- Bretagne (1766), a 110-gun three-decker ship of the line
- Bretagne (1855), a 130-gun steam and sail three-decker
- Ville de Bordeaux (1860), a 90-gun Ville de Nantes-class ship of the line, was renamed Bretagne when she replaced the 1855 Bretagne as a school ship.
- Fontenoy (1858), a 90-gun Suffren-class ship of the line, was renamed Bretagne when she replaced the ex-Ville de Bordeaux as a school ship.
- Bretagne, a battleship, lead ship of her class, sunk at Mers-el-Kebir
- Bretagne (2016), a European multi-mission frigate (FREMM) of the French Navy
- French submarine Saphir (S602), originally ordered as Bretagne in 1979, but renamed before commissioning in 1981.
Ships of the French Navy named Bretagne
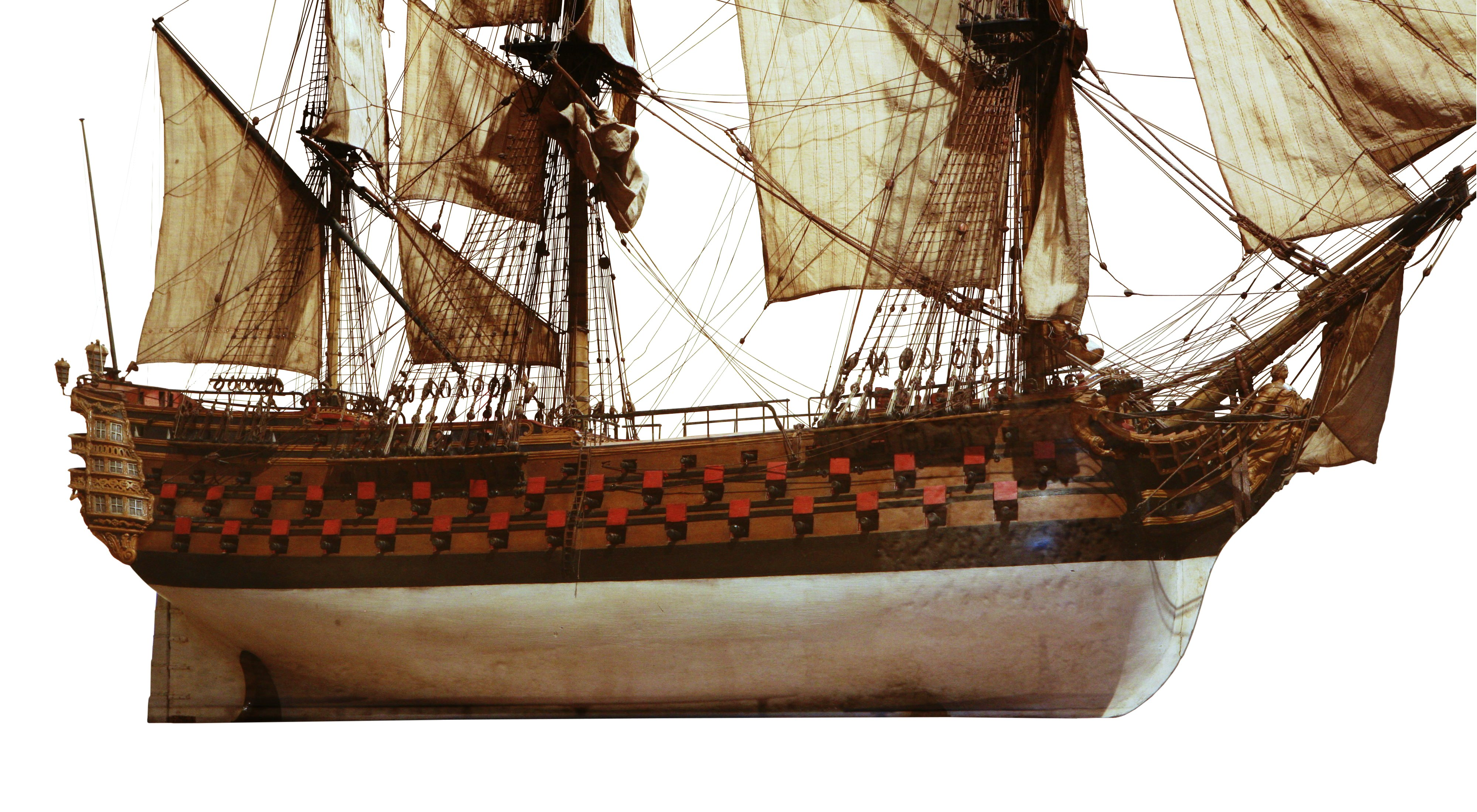
Scale model of Bretagne (1766), on display at Brest naval museum

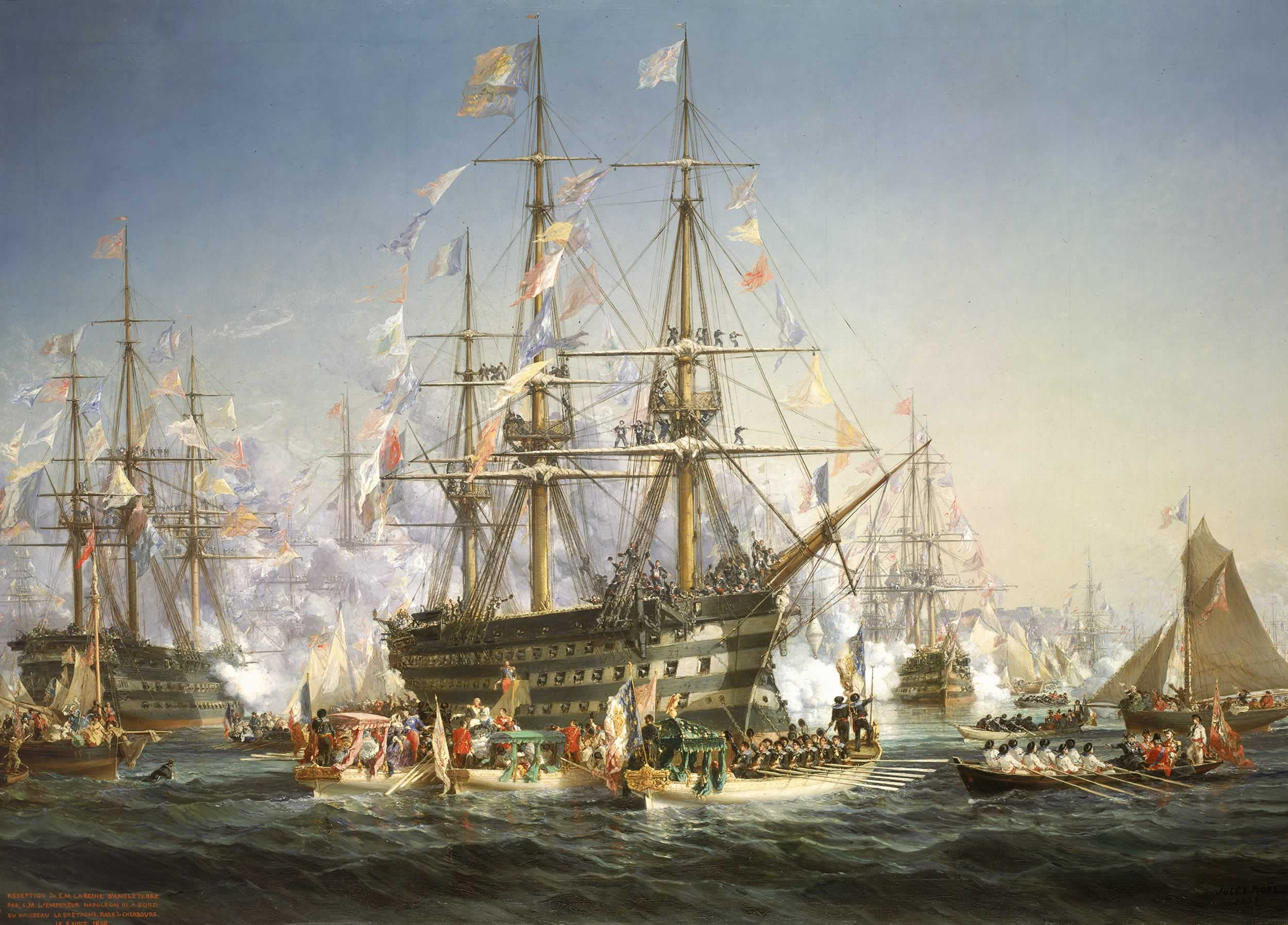
Bretagne (1855), painting by Jules Achille Noël, National Maritime Museum, London.

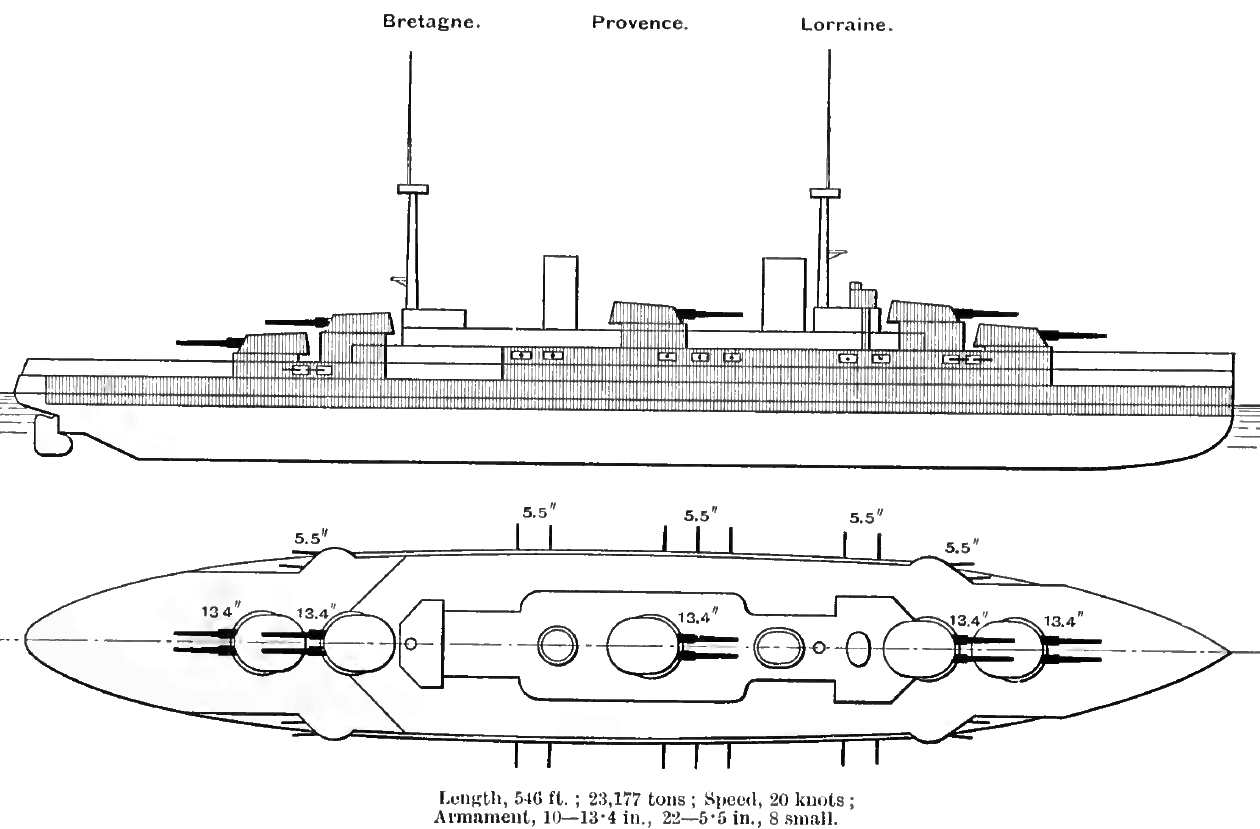
Layout of Bretagne, as depicted by Brassey's Naval Annual 1915

== See also ==
- SS Bretagne - several ships named Bretagne, including
  - SS La Bretagne, an 1886 ocean liner for Compagnie Générale Transatlantique
  - SS Bretagne (1951), a 1951 ocean liner; rechristened SS Brittany in 1962. Destroyed by fire in 1963
- MV Bretagne (1989), a ferry-boat operated by Brittany Ferries

== Notes and references ==
=== Bibliography ===
- Roche, Jean-Michel (2005). Dictionnaire des bâtiments de la flotte de guerre française de Colbert à nos jours. Vol. 1. Group Retozel-Maury Millau. p. 85. ISBN 978-2-9525917-0-6. OCLC 165892922.
