= Walter Hendricks =

Canadian politician

Walter Hendricks (February 9, 1897 – June 17, 1982) was an American-born car dealer and political figure in British Columbia. He represented Nelson-Creston in the Legislative Assembly of British Columbia from 1949 to 1952 as a Liberal.

He was born in Mullan, Idaho, the son of Robert Hendricks and Elizabeth Ann Thatcher. In 1917, Hendricks married Vera Evelyn McKinley. He was a Ford and Monarch dealer and served as president of the Nelson Board of Trade. Hendricks was also president of the Nelson Kiwanis. He served overseas during World War I. Hendricks served in the assembly as a member of a Liberal-Conservative coalition. He was defeated when he ran for reelection in 1952. Hendricks died in Richmond at the age of 85 in 1982.
