= Britney Dolonius =

Filipina actor

- Born: Britney Marianne Jolina Dolonius; June 21, 1992 (age 33); Dinalupihan, Bataan, Philippines
- Occupations: Actress, dancer, model
- Years active: 2013–present

Britney Marianne Jolina Dolonius (born June 21, 1992) is a Filipina actress and model.

== Career ==
Dolonius became famous for her role as Annicka in the teledrama Villa Quintana, a role where she would eventually gain her current screen name. Her biggest break came when she landed the role of Molly in The Borrowed Wife.

The stars of Jennylyn Mercado, Camille Prats, Raymart Santiago, and Rafael Rosell in the daily GMA-7s primetime block soap Second Chances, which received positive audience reception despite its abrupt conclusion

== Filmography ==
=== Television ===
Year	Title	Role(s)	Type of Role
2016	The Millionaire's Wife	Ingrid Buenaluz	Extended role
2016	Karelasyon: Poser	Lorna	Episode guest
2015	The Rich Man's Daughter	Vanessa Guevarra	Special participation
2015	Second Chances	Theresa Guigaman-Castello	Extended role / antagonist
2014	The Borrowed Wife	Molly Perez-Garcia	Special participation
2013/2014	Villa Quintana	Annicka Quintana	Supporting role
