= Nova (Dutch band) =

Dutch electronic music band

- Also known as: Peru, Erotic Dreams
- Origin: Dordrecht, Netherlands
- Genres: Electronic music, synthpop
- Past members: Rob Papen; Ruud van Es; Peter Kommers

Nova was a Dutch electronic music band, who reached the number 1 position in both the Dutch and Belgian charts in 1982 with the instrumental single "Aurora".

== History ==
The group from Dordrecht (South Holland) consisted of Rob Papen, Ruud van Es and Peter Kommers. Later in 1982, the group scored another hit called "Sol". The three members of the band also performed under the name Peru. Nova was the "commercial" branch of Peru. After Nova's success, the group went on as Peru. Using this name, the group had another modest hit in the Dutch single charts with the song "Africa". Rob Papen and Ruud van Es are still active in producing music, albeit no longer under the names Nova nor Peru.

"Aurora" originated as a theme from a Peru song called "Sons of Dawn". Willem van Kooten, former director of the record company Red Bullet, discovered the song and, with help from producer Chris Pilgram, helped make it a number-1 hit in the Netherlands and the definitive breakthrough for both Nova and Peru.

== Discography ==
- Terranova - 1982

Aurora	3:40
Arrive	5:40
Xenos	5:02
Horizon	3:52
Terra	4:08
Sol	4:45
Clear Up	3:25
Ariane (The Traveller)	2:46
La Luna	4:03
Exit	4:04

- Quo Vadis - 1983

Cygnus	3:41
Phase	4:40
Contact	3:30
Pulsar	3:10
Crystal	3:33
Stella Maris	3:44
Atmosphere	3:21
Jig (Presto)	2:47
Vortex	3:47
Quo Vadis	4:44

- The best of Nova

As Erotic Dreams

- Temple of Love (project for Veronica)

Nova - Terranova & Quo Vadis (Remastered & Expanded) - August, 15th 2021 CD 1: 01. Nova - Aurora (Remastered) 02. Nova - Arrivé (Remastered) 03. Nova - Xenos (Remastered) 04. Nova - Horizon (Remastered) 05. Nova - Terra (Remastered) 06. Nova - Sol (Remastered) 07. Nova - Clear Up (Remastered) 08. Nova - Ariane (The Traveller) (Remastered) 09. Nova - La Luna (Remastered) 10. Nova - Exit (Remastered) 11. Nova - Reel (Remastered) 12. Nova - Aurora (12-Inch Single Version) (Remastered)

CD 2: 01. Nova - Cygnus (Remastered) 02. Nova - Phase (Remastered) 03. Nova - Contact (Remastered) 04. Nova - Pulsar (Remastered) 05. Nova - Crystal (Remastered) 06. Nova - Stella Maris (Remastered) 07. Nova - Atmosphere (Remastered) 08. Nova - Jig (Presto) (Remastered) 09. Nova - Vortex (Remastered) 10. Nova - Quo Vadis (Remastered) 11. Nova - Contact (alternative version) (Remastered)
