= Krystle McLaughlin =

Caribbean-American structural biophysicist

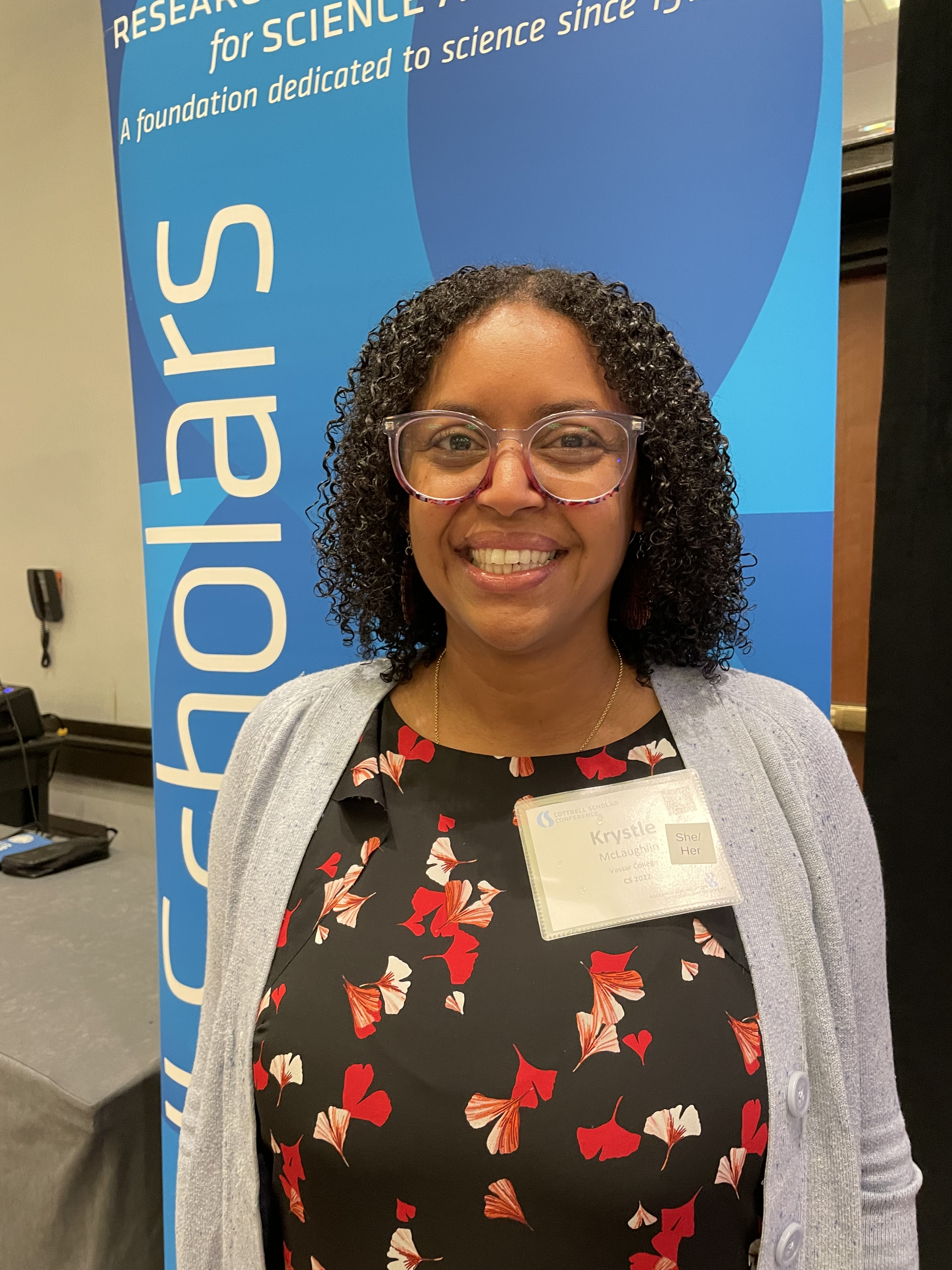
- Krystle McLaughlin at the 2026 Cottrell Scholars Conference in Tucson
- Education: Colgate University; University of Rochester (PhD)
- Scientific career
- Institutions: Lehigh University; Vassar College
- Thesis: Structural and Thermodynamic Analysis of Protein-Nucleic Acid Interactions
- Website: http://www.krystlejmclaughlin.com/

Krystle McLaughlin is a Caribbean-American structural biophysicist. She is an associate professor of chemistry at Vassar College.

== Early life and education ==
McLaughlin grew up in Tobago, where she met Joan and Jay Mandle, professors at Colgate University, who encouraged her to apply. She earned her undergraduate degree in physics at Colgate University in 2006. She was the only woman of colour in her graduating physics class. At Colgate University she was a leader of the Society of Physics Students. She has since returned to Colgate University, to speak at their annual SophoMORE Connections event, introducing undergraduate students to alumni.

She earned her PhD in 2011 in the laboratory of Clara Kielkopf at the University of Rochester. During her graduate studies, she was awarded the University of Rochester's William F. Neuman Award and George Metzger Award, and she was a guest lecturer at Hampton University. In her PhD thesis, she used X-ray crystallography to investigate thermodynamic and structural basis for protein-nucleic acid interactions.

== Research and career ==
McLaughlin joined University of North Carolina at Chapel Hill as a postdoctoral researcher, funded by a Seeding Postdoctoral Innovators in Research and Education (SPIRE) fellowship. As a postdoctoral fellow, she characterised proteins responsible for the transfer of antibiotic resistance and virulence in bacterial cells, as well as teaching the biology program.

She then joined the faculty of Lehigh University a professor of practice, where she started the PA DNA Day, which is now an annual celebration of DNA and genetics. At Lehigh University she developed innovative ways to teach undergraduates how to interpret crystallography. She uses lysozyme to teach students about molecular modelling and crystallisation. She has campaigned for a Synchrotron light source in South Africa.

She joined Vassar College in 2017 as an assistant professor in chemistry and was promoted to associate professor in 2026. At Vassar, her research focus is on the spread of antibiotic resistance, the gut microbiome and biochemistry of mycobacteriophages. She also engages in science outreach activities at Vassar.

As part of her scientific leadership, McLaughlin was the 2018 chair of the American Institute of Physics Liaison Committee on Underrepresented Minorities, and she is the current co-chair of the Scientific Advisory Board of the National Institute of Allergy and Infectious Diseases's Centers for Research on Structural Biology of Infectious Diseases. She was elected to the American Crystallographic Association communication committees.

In 2022, McLaughlin was honored with a Cottrell Scholar Award, which recognizes "significant research and educational advancements."
