= Crystal, West Virginia =

Unincorporated community in West Virginia, United States

- Unincorporated community
- Location within the state of West Virginia Crystal, West Virginia (the United States)
- Coordinates: 37°22′24″N 81°16′17″W
- Country: United States
- State: West Virginia
- County: Mercer
- Elevation: 2,244 ft (684 m)
- Time zone: UTC-5 (Eastern (EST))
  - Summer (DST): UTC-4 (EDT)
- Area codes: 304 & 681
- GNIS feature ID: 2707599

Crystal is an unincorporated community in Mercer County, West Virginia, United States. Crystal is located on Crane Creek and County Route 11, 7.6 miles (12.2 km) north-northwest of Bluefield.

The community most likely derives its name from the Crystal Coal and Coke Company.
