= Kristel Pärtna =

Estonian opera singer (born 1981)

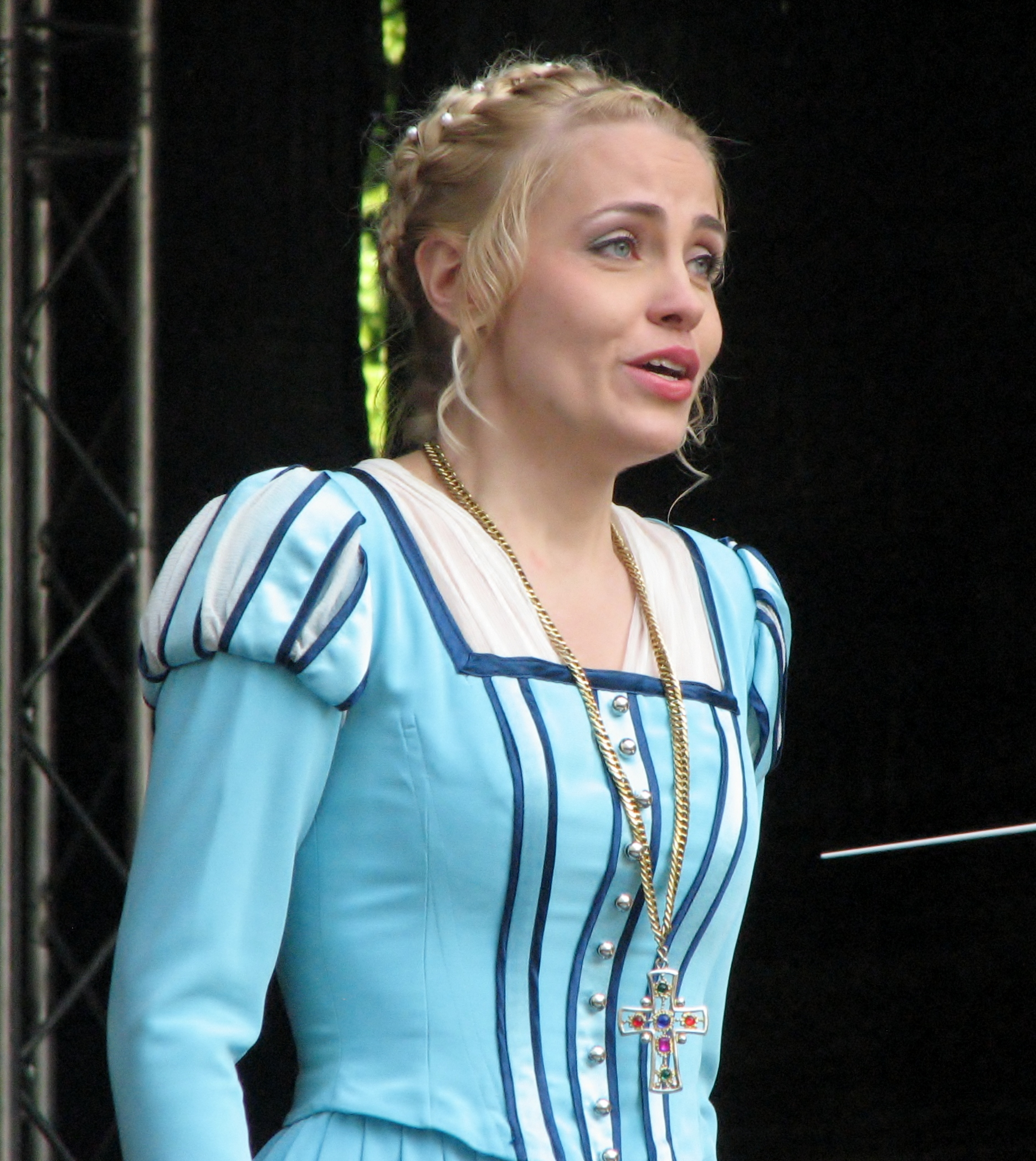
Kristel Pärtna

Kristel Pärtna (née Jõesaar; born 4 November 1981, Tartu) is an Estonian opera singer(soprano).

In 2011, she graduated from Estonian Academy of Music and Theatre in singing speciality.

Since 2012, she is a soloist in Estonian National Opera.

== Awards and honors ==
- 2012: Marje and Kuldar Sink Prize for Young Singer
- 2017 Theatre Award of Harju County
- 2020 SEB Pank Audience Award

== Opera roles ==
- Euridice (Luigi Rossi's "L'Orfeo, immagini di una lontananza")
- Mandane (Johann Adolph Hasse's "Artaserse")
- Norina (Gaetano Donizetti's "Don Pasquale")
- Juliette (Charles Gounod's Roméo et Juliette)
- Rosanna (Mozart's Le nozze di Figaro)
