= Kristal (name) =

Kristal is both a given name and a surname. Notable people with the name include:

Given name:

- Kristal Marshall, American model, actress, beauty queen, and retired professional wrestler
- Kristal Uzelac, former gymnast
- Kristal Abazaj, Albanian professional footballer
- Kristal Tin, Hong Kong singer and former TVB actress

Surname:

- Hilly Kristal, club owner
- Marko Kristal (1973–), Estonian football manager and former player
- Yisrael Kristal (1903–2017), a Polish-Israeli supercentenarian and Holocaust survivor
