= Chrystal =

Chrystal may refer to:

- Crystal, of which it is an older, now non-standard, spelling
- Chrystal (film), a 2005 film
- Chrystal (musician), a British musician

== People with the surname ==
- Bob Chrystal (1930–2023), Canadian ice hockey player
- George Chrystal (1851–1911), Scottish mathematician

== People with the given name ==
- Chrystal Herne (1883–1950), actress
- Chrystal Jaye, medical anthropologist
- Chrystal Soo Jung (or Krystal Jung; born 1994), American singer and actress based in South Korea

== See also ==
- Chrystall
- Crystal (disambiguation)
- McChrystal
