= Brittany (name) =

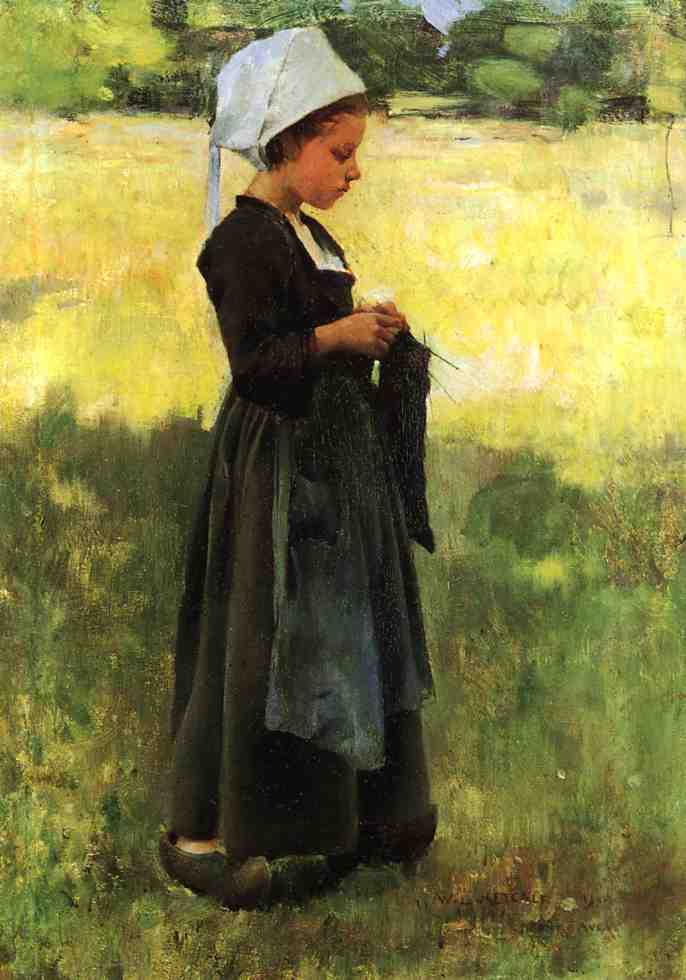
- Breton Girl by Willard Metcalf (1884) depicts a girl in a traditional dress of Brittany
- Gender: Female

Origin
- Language: Breton
- Derivation: Breizh (Breton)
- Meaning: Brittany
- Region of origin: United States

Other names
- Variant forms: Brittney; Britney; Brittanee

Brittany is a feminine given name of Celtic origin. The name comes from the historical country of Brittany, which is now a part of France. This name was first used in the United States in the early 1970s, and peaked in usage during the 1990s. Brittany ranked #934 on the US Popular Names in 2021.

Notable people named Brittany, Britney, Brittney, Brittani, Brittanie or Britnee include those listed below. Brittny is a similar name.

== In entertainment ==
- Brittany Ashworth (born 1989), English actress
- Brittany Broski (born 1997), American influencer and comedian
- Brittany Byrnes (born 1987), Australian actress
- Brittany Curran (born 1990), American actress
- Brittany Daniel (born 1976), American actress
- Britney Dolonius (born 1992), Filipina actress and model
- Brittany Flickinger, American reality TV personality
- Brittany Hargest, American singer and dancer
- Britney Manson (born 1994 or 1995), Russian-Estonian model and influencer
- Brittany Chrishawn Moore, American producer
- Brittany Murphy (1977–2009), American actress
- Brittany O'Grady (born 1996), American actress
- Brittany Snow (born 1986), American actress
- Brittany Tiplady (born 1991), Canadian former actress
- Britney Spears (born 1981), American singer
- Brittany Underwood (born 1988), American actress
- Britney Young (born 1987/1988), American actress

== In sports ==
- Brittany Altomare (born 1990), American professional golfer
- Brittany Baxter (born 1985), Canadian soccer player
- Brittany Bock (born 1987), American soccer player
- Brittany Bowe (born 1988), American long-track speed skater
- Brittany Boyd (born 1993), American basketball player
- Brittany Broben (born 1995), Australian diver
- Brittany Brown, American professional wrestler
- Brittany Brown (sprinter), (born 1995), American sprinter
- Brittany Elmslie (born 1994), Australian competitive swimmer
- Brittney Ezell (born 1976), American basketball coach
- Brittney Griner (born 1990), American basketball player
- Brittany Hayes (born 1985), American water polo player
- Brittany Hochevar (born 1981), American female volleyball and beach volleyball player
- Brittany Hudak (born 1993), Canadian biathlete and cross-country skier
- Brittany Hrynko (born 1993), American basketball player
- Brittany Jackson (born 1983), American basketball player
- Brittany Lincicome (born 1985), American golfer
- Brittany MacLean (born 1994), Canadian competitive swimmer
- Brittany O'Brien (born 1998), Australian diver
- Brittany Ott (born 1990), American professional ice hockey player
- Brittany Phelan (born 1991), Canadian freestyle skier who competes in ski cross
- Brittany Smith (born 1991), American shot put and hammer thrower
- Brittany Spears (born 1988), American basketball player
- Brittney Sykes (born 1994), American basketball player
- Brittany Viola (born 1987), American platform diver

== In politics ==
- Brittney Senger, Canadian politician
- Britnee Timberlake (born 1986), American politician

== Other ==
- Brittanie Cecil (1988–2002), teen who died when a puck hit her in the face during an NHL hockey game
- Brittany Friedman, American sociologist and author
- Britney Gallivan (born 1985), known for determining the maximum number of times that paper or other materials can be folded in half
- Brittany Hensel, sister to Abigail Hensel; the two are dicephalic conjoined twins
- Brittani Kline, American fashion model and America's Next Top Model contestant
- Brittany Luse, American podcast host
- Brittany "Bre" Scullark, American fashion model and America's Next Top Model contestant
- Brittany "McKey" Sullivan, American fashion model and America's Next Top Model contestant
- Brittany Mahomes, American sports team owner and wife of American football quarterback Patrick Mahomes

== Fictional characters ==
- Britney Allen, lead character in Bring It On: All or Nothing
- Britney Britney, a parody character of Britney Spears in the animated series The Fairly OddParents
- Brittany Hodges, a character in the CBS soap opera The Young and the Restless
- Brittany Miller, lead singer of The Chipettes and from the Alvin and the Chipmunks franchise
- Brittany Pierce, a character in the television musical series Glee
- Brittany Taylor, a character in the animated series Daria
- Brittany Wilson, in the 2004 comedy White Chicks
