= List of training ships of SUNY Maritime College and preceding organizations =

This is an historical list of training ships used at SUNY Maritime College.

#	Name	Other names	Type	Year launched	Years as training ship	Name of organization
1.	USS St. Mary's	None	Sloop of War	1844	1874-1907	New York Nautical School
2.	USS Newport	None	Gunboat	1896	1907-1931	New York Nautical School/New York State Nautical School/New York State Merchant Marine Academy
3.	Annex	Gilford D. Pendleton/Guilford D. Pendleton (schooner hulk converted to classrooms and dormitories)	Schooner	1918	1929-1938	New York State Nautical School/New York State Merchant Marine Academy
4.	Empire State I	Procyon, American Pilot, Bay State II	Hog Islander Cargo Ship	1921	1930-1941; 1943-1946 (as American Pilot)	New York State Merchant Marine Academy/New York State Maritime Academy
5.	Keystone State	Seneca	Cutter	1908	1942 (for half the cruise)	New York State Maritime Academy
6.	American Seafarer	Allegheny	Coastal Passenger Ship	1923	1942 (for half the cruise)	New York State Maritime Academy
7.	Empire State II	USS Hydrus	Artemis Class Attack Cargo Ship	1944	1946-1956	New York State Maritime Academy/SUNY Maritime College
8.	Empire State III	USS Mercy	Comfort class hospital ship	1943	1956-1959	SUNY Maritime College
9.	Empire State IV	Biloxi/USNS Henry Gibbins	Troop transport	1942	1959-1973	SUNY Maritime College
10.	Empire State V	SS President Jackson/USNS Barrett	Troop transport	1950	1973-1990	SUNY Maritime College
11.	The Domer	USS Waubansee	Navy Tugboat	1944	1983-unknown	SUNY Maritime College
12.	Empire State VI	SS Oregon/SS Mormactide	Break bulk cargo freighter	1961	1990-2022	SUNY Maritime College
13	SUNY Maritime	USNS Stalwart	Ocean Surveillance Ship	1983	2002-2011	SUNY Maritime College
14	T/V SUNY Maritime College	USCG Ohio Boat	41-foot Utility Boat, Large	Unknown	Unknown-present	SUNY Maritime College
15.	Empire State VII	(None, newbuild)	National Security Multi-Mission Vessel	2020	2023-present	SUNY Maritime College
