= John R. Ryan =

American admiral (born 1945)

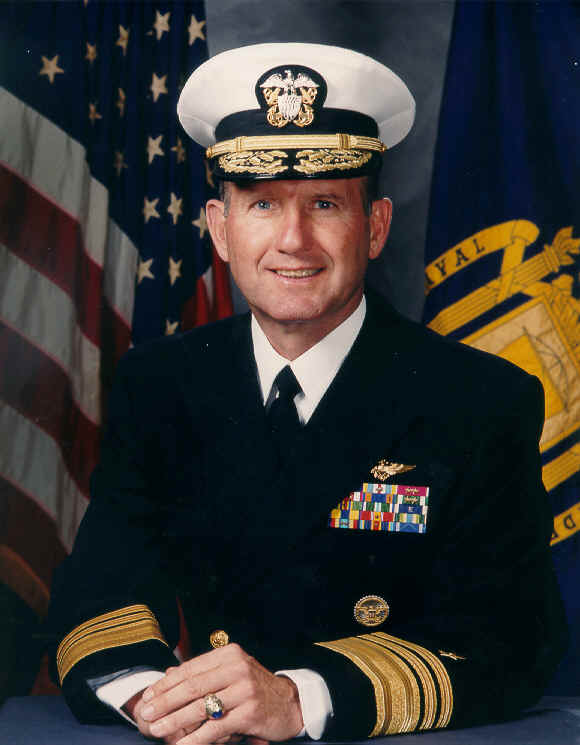
- Born: John Roy Ryan; August 15, 1945 (age 81); Harrisburg, Pennsylvania, U.S.
- Military career
- Allegiance: United States
- Branch: United States Navy
- Service years: 1963–2002
- Rank: Vice Admiral
- Commands: United States Naval Academy; Patrol Wing 10; Patrol Squadron 31; Patrol Squadron 11
- Awards: Navy Distinguished Service Medal; Defense Superior Service Medal (2); Legion of Merit (3); Meritorious Service Medal (3); Air Medal; Navy Commendation Medal (3)
- Other work: President, State University of New York Maritime College (2002–06); Chancellor, State University of New York (2006–07); President and CEO, Center for Creative Leadership (2007–2022)

John R. Ryan (born August 15, 1945) is a retired United States Navy vice admiral who was the Superintendent of the United States Naval Academy and as the Chancellor of the State University of New York. He most recently was the CEO and President of Center for Creative Leadership, a non-profit organization focusing on leadership education and research.

== Naval career ==
A native of Mountainhome, Pennsylvania, Ryan graduated from the United States Naval Academy in June 1967 with his twin brother, Vice Admiral Norbert Ryan Jr. After designation as a naval aviator, his initial assignment was to Patrol Squadron 8. From 1972 to 1975, he was assigned to the Candidate Guidance Office at the Naval Academy. He then served two years aboard the USS Nimitz as Assistant Navigator followed by a department head tour in Patrol Squadron 26.

Ryan received a Master of Science Degree in Administration from George Washington University, Washington D.C. in 1975. He has also completed the program for Senior Executives in National and International Security at the John F. Kennedy School of Government, Harvard University.

Prior to the selection for flag rank, Ryan commanded Patrol Squadron 11, Patrol Squadron 31, and Patrol Wing 10. Other Shore assignments included the Strategic Concepts Group in the Office of Chief of Naval Operations, Military Assistant to the Executive Secretary in the immediate office of the Secretary of Defense, executive assistant to the Deputy Chief of Naval Operations (Air Warfare), and executive assistant to the Commander in Chief, United States Pacific Command.

== Flag assignments ==
In March 1991, he was promoted to rear admiral and served as the Director, Logistics and Security Assistance (J4) for the Commander in Chief, U.S. Pacific Command. In August 1993, Ryan assumed his duties as Commander, Patrol Wings, U.S. Pacific Fleet/Commander, Anti-Submarine Warfare Forces, U.S. Pacific Fleet.

Ryan was the United States Naval Academy's Superintendent for four years before retiring. He assumed his duties as the 32nd President of the State University of New York Maritime College on June 14, 2002.

Concurrent with his duties at the Maritime College, Ryan briefly filled in as Interim President of the University at Albany.

Ryan was named Acting Chancellor of the State University of New York System in April 2005. and assumed the full role in December of that year.

On March 7, 2007, Ryan announced that he would step down as Chancellor on May 31, 2007, to become the president and CEO of the Center for Creative Leadership headquartered in Greensboro, N.C. He stepped down from the role in January, 2022.

== Other Activities ==
Ryan has been a director of Cablevision Systems Corporation since 2002 and is chairman of the U.S. Naval Academy Foundation Board. In 2012, Ryan received $247,508 in cash and stock as a Cablevision director.

Academic offices
Preceded by Charles R. Larson	Superintendent of United States Naval Academy; 1998–2002	Succeeded by Richard J. Naughton
Preceded by David C. Brown	President of the State University of New York Maritime College; 2002–2006	Succeeded by John W. Craine Jr.
Preceded by Carlos E. Santiago (Officer in Charge)	Interim President of the University at Albany, SUNY; 2004–2005	Succeeded by Kermit L. Hall
Preceded by Robert L. King	Chancellor of the State University of New York; June – December 2005 (Acting); 2005–2007	Succeeded by John B. Clark (Acting)
