= Theodorus Bailey =

Theodorus Bailey may refer to:

- Theodorus Bailey (politician) (1758–1828), United States senator from New York
- Theodorus Bailey (officer) (1805–1877), naval officer in the U.S. Civil War and the senator's nephew
