= John Craine =

John Craine may refer to:

- John W. Craine Jr. (born 1945), United States Navy admiral
- John Pares Craine (died 1977), American Episcopal bishop
