= Western States Petroleum Association =

American trade association

Western States Petroleum Association (WSPA) is a non-profit trade association that represents companies that account for the bulk of petroleum exploration, production, refining, transportation and marketing in the six western states of Arizona, California, Hawaii, Nevada, Oregon and Washington. Founded in 1907, WSPA is the oldest petroleum trade association in the United States of America. WSPA's headquarters are located in Sacramento, California. Additional WSPA locations include offices in Torrance; Santa Barbara; Bakersfield; Scottsdale, Arizona and Olympia, Washington.

The current WSPA president is Catherine Reheis-Boyd.

Members of the WSPA include Aera Energy LLC, Alaska Tanker Company, Berry Petroleum, BP, Big West of California LLC, Chevron Corporation, ConocoPhillips, ExxonMobil, Lloyd Properties, Navajo Refining Co., Noble Energy, Olympic Pipeline Company, Pacific Operators Offshore, Plains All American, SeaRiver Maritime, Seneca Resources Corp., Shell, Tesoro, U.S. Oil and Refining, Valero Energy Corporation, Venoco, and Western Refining.

== Lobbying ==
WSPA is routinely one of the largest lobbying forces in the state of California. In 2014, WSPA spent $8.9 million lobbying - nearly double what it spent in the previous year. WSPA spent $4.67 million in 2013. The increase happened during a push by WSPA and other oil and gas industry to roll back transportation fuels coming under California's cap-and-trade program under the Global Warming Solutions Act of 2006.

== Controversy ==
In November 2014, a leaked PowerPoint from Western States Petroleum Association revealed it "activates" and funds front groups that are designed to weaken California's climate change law Global Warming Solutions Act of 2006. The front groups, which included groups like the California Drivers Alliance and Fed Up at the Pump, appeared to be grassroots groups representing consumer interests, while WSPA spent millions on PR campaigns to further the oil industry's policy agenda.
