= SeaRiver Maritime =

American subsidiary of ExxonMobil

- Company type: Subsidiary
- Industry: Maritime transport
- Founded: 1993; 33 years ago
- Headquarters: United States
- Parent: ExxonMobil

SeaRiver Maritime is a wholly owned subsidiary of ExxonMobil. The company was formed in the early 1990s by Exxon when it spun off its maritime operations into the new company following the Exxon Valdez oil spill in 1989.

In 1994, SeaRiver applied for a federal subsidy to operate tankers in the Persian Gulf. The petition stated they needed the money to stay competitive, because the S/R Mediterranean (the new name for the Exxon Valdez vessel) was unable to operate in Prince William Sound following the passage of the Oil Pollution Act of 1990, which prohibits the tanker from operating in that area.

In 1996, SeaRiver sought to put the S/R Mediterranean back into Prince William Sound by arguing that the Oil Pollution Act of 1990 was unconstitutional. The Act prohibits any vessel that has spilled more than a million gallons of oil from operating in Prince William Sound. SeaRiver claimed the act was retroactively being applied to the S/R Mediterranean. In 1998, a judge ruled against SeaRiver.

The company currently operates three tankers engaged in the Alaska-West Coast crude oil trade. In July 2011, the company ordered two new crude oil tankers to be built at Aker Philadelphia Shipyard, due to be delivered in 2014, which will replace two existing vessels.
