= Giles C. Stedman =

American naval officer (1897–1961)

Giles Chester Stedman (1897–1961), Rear Admiral (United States) and a recipient of the Navy Cross, was the 2nd Superintendent of the United States Merchant Marine Academy at Kings Point, New York. The son of an Ireland born stonecutter, who worked in Quincy, Massachusetts' granite quarries, Stedman enlisted in the United States Coast Guard in 1917 at the age of 20. He was assigned to the USCGC Ossipee (WPR-50). At outbreak of WWI, the ship and its crew were transferred to the US Navy and saw overseas action. Stedman was awarded the World War I Victory Medal for his service. In 1919, he was commissioned an ensign in the United States Naval Reserve. Stedman, thereafter, entered the merchant marine, licensed as a ship's Third mate or 3rd officer.

== First rescue at sea and acts of seagoing heroism ==
In 1925, while serving as the First officer of the passenger liner SS Harding, in raging seas and at great personal risk, Stedman commanded the lifeboat that accomplished the near impossible task of rescuing the entire crew of the sinking Italian cargo ship Ignazio Florio. Stedman received civilian medals from the governments of Italy, the United States and from the Lifesaving Benevolent Association for his actions, and a ticker tape parade through New York City honored the entire crew of the Harding.

== Second rescue at sea and award of the Navy Cross ==
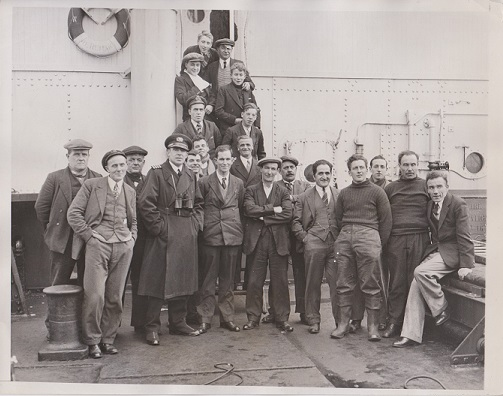
Capt. Giles C. Stedman (with binoculars) and 20 of the 22 lives that he saved from drowning on the sinking British freighter SS Exeter City

While serving as Master (naval) of the SS American Merchant in 1933, in impossibly violent seas, Stedman effected the rescue of the entire crew of the sinking British merchant steamer SS Exeter City, save its captain and 3 of its crew, who had already been swept overboard in the gale before the American Merchant arrived on the scene. With the American Merchant still 15 miles away and the distressed Exeter City at Longitude 39.3 West and Latitude 47.27 North about 650 miles out at sea off the coast of St. John's, Newfoundland, some third of the way between there and the tip of Ireland, the Exeter City radioed that its "No. 2 hatch" was already "stove-in, its life boats gone, and its bridge damaged." With the seas too torrent to hazard a lifeboat rescue, Stedman had the American Merchant circle the Exeter City while discharging heavy oil to calm the adjacent sea (oil, while not as dense and floating on water, is more viscous). He then fired a line 400 yards to the rapidly sinking freighter. The line was used to pull a lifeboat from the American Merchant to the Exeter City. After the crew of the Exeter City boarded the lifeboat, they were pulled to safety by Stedman's crew. For this amazing feat of rescue, US Navy reservist Giles C. Stedman was awarded the Navy Cross. He also received a silver plaque from the government of Great Britain, the keys to the City of Boston, Massachusetts, and a medal of valor from the City of New York. When Stedman later wrote an article on methods of rescue at sea, it was considered such a technical milestone and so advanced procedures for rescues at sea of the day that Mount St. Mary's University (then, college) awarded Stedman the degree of D.Litt. (honoris causa) and Colgate University awarded him a D.Sc. degree (honoris causa). A second of Stedman's articles on sea rescue was published in the United States Naval Institute Proceedings in 1935.

== Third seagoing rescue ==
While mastering the SS Washington, Stedman rescued the entire crew of the British freighter Olive Grove when it was torpedoed by a German U-boat off the Irish coast in 1939. By age 43, Stedman held the merchant rank of Commodore.

== WWII activation, final and greatest rescue operation, and death ==
In 1941, reservist Stedman was activated into the US Navy at the US Navy rank of commander and made executive officer of the United States Navy troop transport USS West Point (AP-23) (former ocean liner SS America (1939)). In 1942, as then British Singapore was about to be overrun by Imperial Japanese forces and while under heavy air attack, the crew of the USS West Point rescued over 2000 British refugees from Singapore, many women and children. During the war, the US Navy promoted Stedman first to the rank of captain and then to rear admiral and appointed him first Commandant of Cadets and then Superintendent at the United States Merchant Marine Academy. He served as the academy's superintendent from 1943 to 1946. Stedman died of a cerebral hemorrhage at his home in London, England, in 1961. The Mayor of Quincy, Massachusetts, ordered the flags there flown at half-mast in honor of Stedman.

=== Giles C. Stedman's Navy Cross citation ===

The President of the United States of America takes pleasure in presenting the Navy Cross to Lieutenant Commander Giles C. Stedman, United States Naval Reserve, for distinguished service in the line of his profession as Commanding Officer of the S.S. American Merchant when that vessel was engaged in the rescue of twenty-two members of the crew of the British freighter Exeter City which was sinking in the mid-Atlantic, on 20 January 1933. Lieutenant Commander Stedman's excellent seamanship, keen judgment, and professional ability displayed in saving twenty-two lives during a howling wind and a dangerous sea without detriment to his own command is of the highest order and in accordance with the best traditions of the Naval Service. General Orders: Bureau of Navigation Bulletin 199 (September 23, 1933)

Preceded by Captain James Harvey Tomb, USN	Superintendent, US Merchant Marine Academy; 1943-1946	Succeeded by Rear Admiral Richard R. McNulty, USNR
