= Leroy J. Alexanderson =

American Commodore (1910–2004)

- Born: Leroy John Alexanderson; 27 June 1910; Sheepshead Bay, Brooklyn, New York
- Died: 28 February 2004 (aged 93); Hampton, Virginia
- Occupations: Naval officer, ship's captain

Leroy John Alexanderson (June 27, 1910 – February 28, 2004) was the last captain of the SS United States, the largest ocean liner ever built in the United States and the fastest ocean liner in history. Alexanderson also served as Commodore of the United States Lines fleet.

== Biography ==
Born June 27, 1910, to Swedish immigrant parents in Sheepshead Bay, Brooklyn, New York, Alexanderson graduated from Brooklyn's James Madison High School in 1928. He attended the SUNY Maritime College at Fort Schuyler, then known as the New York Merchant Marine Academy. He graduated in 1930, commissioned in both the Naval Reserve and the Maritime Service.

In 1938 he volunteered for active duty in the United States Navy, and was assigned to the USS Melville (AD-2). He captained the USS Livingston (AP-163) before taking command of the newly commissioned USS Gage (APA-168), an attack transport. Alexanderson commanded the Gage at Okinawa, landing elements of the 6th Marine Division.

Following decommissioning of the Gage in 1947, Alexanderson returned to Merchant Marine Service with the United States Lines. He served on several ships before becoming master of the SS America in 1955, and the SS United States in 1962. He was appointed Commodore of the United States Lines Fleet in 1966, meaning he was in overall command of the line's 52 ships. He also continued to serve as master of the SS United States until its retirement in 1969. Alexanderson retired in 1976. At the time he was the only reserve officer of flag rank within the United States Merchant Marine, having been promoted to rear admiral in 1959.

Alexanderson died February 28, 2004, at the age of 93. He was buried with full military honors. He was buried in the uniform he wore as Commodore of United States Lines and Captain of the United States. His other uniforms were donated to the Maritime Industry Museum at Fort Schuyler.

== Awards ==
- American Defense Service Medal
- European-African-Middle Eastern Campaign Medal
- Asiatic-Pacific Campaign Medal with two battle stars
- World War II Victory Medal
- Navy Occupation Medal
