= Joseph Hazelwood =

Captain of Exxon Valdez during its 1989 oil spill

- Born: Joseph Jeffrey Hazelwood; September 24, 1946; Hawkinsville, Georgia, U.S.
- Died: July 21, 2022 (aged 75)
- Occupation: Maritime consultant
- Known for: Captain of Exxon Valdez during the Exxon Valdez oil spill

Joseph Jeffrey Hazelwood (September 24, 1946 – c. July 22, 2022) was an American sailor. He was the captain of Exxon Valdez during her 1989 oil spill. He was accused of being intoxicated which contributed to the disaster, but was cleared of this charge at his 1990 trial after witnesses testified that he was sober around the time of the accident. Hazelwood was convicted of a lesser charge, negligent discharge of oil (a misdemeanor), fined $50,000, and sentenced to 1,000 hours of community service.

== Early years ==
Hazelwood was born in Hawkinsville, Georgia, and raised in Huntington, Long Island, New York. His father, Joseph, was a United States Marine Corps torpedo bomber pilot turned airline pilot. His mother, Margaret, was born in Georgia. Hazelwood was their first-born son. He was married in 1969 to Suzanne and had one daughter, Alison (born 1975).

In 1964, Hazelwood graduated from Huntington High School, where his IQ was reportedly tested at 138. As a youth he was an avid sailor and was a member of the Sea Scouts. In May 1968, he received a Bachelor of Science degree in marine transportation from the State University of New York Maritime College.

== Early career ==
Following college, on June 10, 1968, he was hired as a Third Mate by Humble Oil and Refining Company, which later became Exxon Shipping Company. His first ship was Esso Florence homeported in Wilmington, North Carolina. Hazelwood climbed the ranks of the merchant marine until he obtained a master's license at age 31.

By age 32, he was the youngest captain working for Exxon when he took command of Exxon Philadelphia, a California-to-Alaska oil tanker, in 1978. In 1985 he was master of Exxon Chester when the asphalt carrier ran into a storm during her New York to South Carolina trip. High winds damaged the ship's mast including radar and radio communications antennas. Though the crew was prepared to abandon ship, Hazelwood rallied them and guided the ship to safety. In 1987, he became the alternate master of Exxon Valdez which subsequently received Exxon Fleet safety awards for the year of 1987 and 1988.

Hazelwood said that he was diagnosed with a form of "depression, characterized by episodic abuse of alcohol". His driver's license had been suspended or revoked three times by the state of New York for alcohol violations since 1984. He entered a rehabilitation program in 1985 at South Oaks Hospital in Amityville, New York. Following rehabilitation he received 90 days of leave to attend Alcoholics Anonymous. At the time of the Exxon Valdez incident in March 1989, his New York state driving privileges were suspended as a result of a driving under the influence arrest on September 13, 1988.

== Exxon Valdez oil spill ==
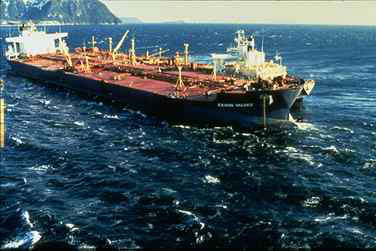
Exxon Valdez offloading her remaining crude oil to another tanker, three days after the vessel grounded

Exxon Valdez departed the port of Valdez, Alaska, at 9:12 p.m. on March 23, 1989, with 53 million gallons of crude oil bound for California. A harbor pilot guided the ship through the Valdez Narrows before departing the ship and returning control to Hazelwood, the ship's master. The ship maneuvered out of the outbound traffic lane in the Traffic Separation Scheme (TSS) to avoid icebergs. Following the maneuver and sometime after 11 p.m., Hazelwood departed the navigation bridge and was in his stateroom at the time of the accident.

He left Third Mate Gregory Cousins in charge of the navigation bridge and Able Seaman Robert Kagan at the helm with instructions to the third mate to return to the southbound traffic lane in the TSS at a prearranged point. Exxon Valdez failed to return to the shipping lanes and struck Bligh Reef at around 12:04 a.m. on March 24, 1989. The accident resulted in the discharge of around 11 million gallons of oil, 20% of the cargo, into Prince William Sound.

Exxon fired Hazelwood following the accident.

During Hazelwood's trial, Alaska state prosecutors failed to convince the jury that Hazelwood was intoxicated at the time of the grounding. By his own admission, Hazelwood drank "two or three vodkas" between 4:30 p.m. and 6:30 p.m. that same night, before boarding the Exxon Valdez at 8:25 p.m. His blood alcohol content was found to be .061. However, the defense argued that the blood samples were taken nearly ten hours after the incident and were mishandled.

Most states, including Alaska, do not allow samples after three hours, and a preservative required to halt fermentation was not added to the sample. Fermentation could have added to the amount of alcohol in the sample, making the result invalid. In March 1990 he was acquitted of second-degree criminal mischief, of operating a vessel while intoxicated and of reckless endangerment; he was however convicted of misdemeanor negligence for discharging oil, fined $50,000, and sentenced to 1,000 hours of community service. After eight years of ultimately unsuccessful appeals, he started community service in 1999.

As a result of the accident, in 1991 the United States Coast Guard suspended his masters' license for a period of nine months.

== Post-Exxon Valdez ==
Hazelwood never had his master's license revoked and it remained valid, but he was unable to find long-term work as a captain after the spill. His alma mater, SUNY Maritime College, hired him in a show of solidarity as a teacher aboard the T/S Empire State V the year after the incident with the Valdez. In 1997, he was working as a para-legal and maritime consultant with New York City's Chalos & Brown, the firm that represented him in his legal cases. He was residing in his native Long Island as of 1997. In 1999, he was in Anchorage performing his community service sentence.

Though he was originally sentenced to assist with the clean-up of the oil spill, due to the lengthy appeals process, his community service was conducted in the Anchorage, Alaska area, beginning in June 1999 picking up trash from local roads, later moving to Bean's Cafe, a local soup kitchen. His community service was conducted over five years with the Anchorage Parks Beautification Program. He paid the $50,000 fine in May 2002.

In 2009, Hazelwood offered a "heartfelt apology" to the people of Alaska, but suggested he had been wrongly blamed for the disaster: "The true story is out there for anybody who wants to look at the facts, but that's not the sexy story and that's not the easy story," he said. Hazelwood said he felt Alaskans always gave him a fair shake. The apology appears in an interview in the book The Spill: Personal Stories from the Exxon Valdez Disaster by Sharon Bushell.

Hazelwood died on July 21, 2022, but no further information was given. At the time of his death, he had been ill from cancer and COVID-19.

== In popular culture ==
Following the Exxon Valdez incident, Hazelwood was ridiculed by talk shows and late night television. He was the subject of a "Top Ten" list on Late Night with David Letterman, in which one of his excuses was, "I was just trying to scrape some ice off the reef for my margarita."

He was featured in the syndicated comic strip The Far Side, which showed him as a clumsy person who spilled things in various stages of his life.

In the 1995 film Waterworld, Hazelwood was anointed the patron saint of the movie's villain "The Deacon", leader of the "Smokers", a band of scavenging raiders. The film displayed Hazelwood's portrait prominently aboard their flagship, also called Exxon Valdez.
