= John W. Craine Jr. =

United States admiral and university president

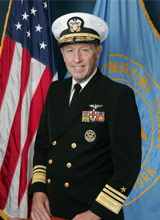
- Vice Admiral John W. Craine Jr. USN (ret.)
- Born: June 4, 1945 (age 81); Richmond, Virginia, U.S.
- Military career
- Allegiance: United States Navy
- Service years: 1968-2001
- Rank: Vice admiral
- Commands: Director, Naval Training, Office of the Chief of Naval Operations Chief of Naval Education and Training
- Awards: Navy Distinguished Service Medal; Legion of Merit (three awards); Meritorious Service Medal; Air Medal; Navy-Marine Corps Commendation Medal; Navy-Marine Corps Achievement Medal; Navy Expeditionary Medal; National Defense Service Medal (two awards)
- Other work: President: State University of New York Maritime College (2006-2011)

John W. Craine Jr. is a retired United States Navy vice admiral who was appointed president of the State University of New York Maritime College on May 27, 2006, after serving as the acting president since June 2005. He joined SUNY in October 2001, and served as the interim president of the Maritime College until July 2002, when he became the founding president of the State University's Neil D. Levin Graduate Institute of International Relations and Commerce. In January 2003, he served as chairman of the board of trustees Task Force on Efficiency and Effectiveness of the State University. In March 2004, he joined the Research Foundation, State University of New York, as senior vice president.

== Background and naval career ==
During his 33-year career in the U.S. Navy, Craine, a fighter pilot, held several senior leadership positions, including command of a fighter squadron, a naval air station, and 26 naval bases and air stations in the Atlantic Fleet. He culminated his service as Director, Naval Training, Office of the Chief of Naval Operations, and Chief of Naval Education and Training, overseeing 168 training activities that provided training for 440,000 officers, soldiers, sailors, airmen and marines each year, in programs ranging from enlisted basic and technical training to naval flight training.

Craine is a graduate of Christchurch School in Christchurch, Virginia, Randolph-Macon College in Ashland, Virginia, and is a distinguished graduate of the Air Command and Staff College. He and his spouse, Wendy, reside on campus. They have two grown sons.

New York Maritime Ring Dance Craine with several cadets.

== See also ==
- List of presidents and superintendents of the State University of New York Maritime College and preceding organizations

Preceded by VADM John R. Ryan USN(ret.)	President of the State University of New York Maritime College; 2006-2011	Succeeded by RADM Wendi B. Carpenter USN(ret.)
