= List of presidents and superintendents of SUNY Maritime College and preceding organizations =

This is a list of the leaders of the institution now known as the State University of New York Maritime College.

#	Rank	Name	Years in office	Graduate	Name of position	Name of organization
1.	CDR (USN)	Robert L. Phythian	1874-1878		Superintendent	New York Nautical School
2.	CAPT (USN)	Henry Erben	1879-1882		Superintendent	New York Nautical School
3.	CDR (USN)	Edwin M. Shepard	1883-1886		Superintendent	New York Nautical School
4.	CDR (USN)	A. S. Crowninshield	1887-1890		Superintendent	New York Nautical School
5.	CDR (USN)	John McGowan	1891-1894		Superintendent	New York Nautical School
6.	LCDR (USN)	W. L. Field	1894-1897		Superintendent	New York Nautical School
7.	LCDR (USN)	W. H. Reeder	1897-1898		Superintendent	New York Nautical School
8.	CAPT (USN)	Howard Patterson	1898-1898		Superintendent	New York Nautical School
9.	CDR (USN)	W. H. Reeder	1898-1901	New York Nautical School	Superintendent	
10.	CDR (USN)	A. V. Wadhams	1901-1902		Superintendent	New York Nautical School
11.	CDR (USN ret.)	G. C. Hanus	1902-1908		Superintendent	New York Nautical School
12.	LCDR (USN ret.)	L. H. Everhart	1908-1911		Superintendent	New York Nautical School
13.	CAPT (USN ret.)	Harry M. Dombaugh	1911-1912		Superintendent	New York Nautical School
14.	CDR (USN ret.)	Edwin H. Tillman	1912-1914		Superintendent	New York Nautical School
15.	LCDR (USNR)	J. R. Driggs	1914-1914	Graduate	Superintendent	New York State Nautical School
16.	LCDR (USNR)	F. S. McMurray	1914-1917	Graduate	Superintendent	New York State Nautical School
17.	LCDR (USNR)	Felix Riesenberg	1917-1919	Graduate	Superintendent	New York State Nautical School
18.	LCDR (USNR)	T. W. Sheridan	1919-1919	Graduate	Superintendent	New York State Nautical School
19.	LCDR (USCG)	J. S. Baylis	1919-1923	Graduate	Superintendent	New York State Nautical School
20.	LCDR (USNR)	Felix Riesenberg	1923-1924	Graduate	Superintendent	New York State Nautical School
21.	CDR (USNR)	E. V. W. Keen	1925-1927	Graduate	Superintendent	New York State Nautical School
22.	CAPT (USN ret.)	James Harvey Tomb	1927-1942		Superintendent	New York State Nautical School/New York State Merchant Marine Academy
23.	VADM (USN ret.)	Thomas Tingey Craven	1942-1945		Superintendent	New York State Maritime Academy
24.	VADM (USN ret.)	Herbert F. Leary	1946-1951		Superintendent/President	New York State Maritime Academy/State University of New York Maritime College
25.	VADM (USN ret.)	Calvin T. Durgin	1951-1959		President	State University of New York Maritime College
26.	VADM (USCG ret.)	H. C. Moore	1959-1967	Graduate	President	State University of New York Maritime College
27.	RADM (USN ret.)	Edward J. O'Donnell	1967-1972		President	State University of New York Maritime College
28.	RADM (USN ret.)	Sheldon H. Kinney	1972-1982		President	State University of New York Maritime College
29.	RADM (USN ret.)	Floyd H. Miller	1982-1995	Graduate	President	State University of New York Maritime College
30.	RADM (USMS)	David Brown	1995-2002		President	State University of New York Maritime College
31.	VADM (USN ret.)	John W. Craine Jr.	2001-2002		President (interim)	State University of New York Maritime College
32.	VADM (USN ret.)	John R. Ryan	2002-2005		President	State University of New York Maritime College
33.	VADM (USN ret.)	John W. Craine Jr.	2005-2011		President	State University of New York Maritime College
34.	RADM (USN ret.)	Wendi B. Carpenter	2011-2013		President	State University of New York Maritime College
35.	None	Michael A. Cappeto	2013-2014		President (interim)	State University of New York Maritime College
36.	RADM (USMS)	Michael A. Alfultis	2014-2024		President	State University of New York Maritime College
37.	RADM (USN ret.)	John A. Okon	2024-	Graduate	President	State University of New York Maritime College
