= USS Gage =

US Navy vessel

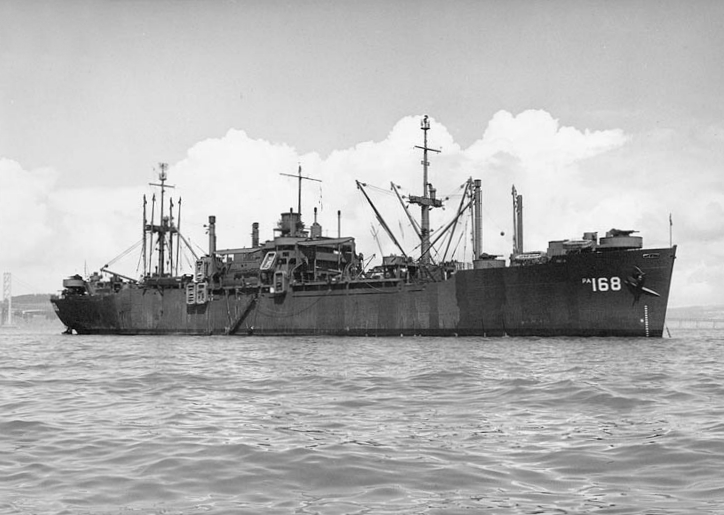

History

United States
- Name: USS Gage
- Namesake: Gage County, Nebraska
- Ordered: 20 April 1943
- Builder: Oregon Shipbuilding Corporation
- Laid down: 13 August 1944
- Launched: 14 October 1944
- Commissioned: 12 November 1944
- Decommissioned: 26 February 1947
- Stricken: 1 October 1958
- Honours and awards: 1 Battle star
- Fate: Scrapped, August 2009 by ESCO Marine, Inc.
- Notes: Last existing Haskell-class attack transport

General characteristics
- Displacement: Light: 7190 tons; Full: 10,680 tons
- Length: 455 ft (139 m)
- Beam: 62 ft (19 m)
- Draught: 24 ft (7.3 m)
- Propulsion: Oil Fired Steam Turbine; 1 Shaft
- Speed: 18 knots
- Boats & landing craft carried: 26
- Complement: 56 Officers, 480 Enlisted
- Armament: 1 5"/38 gun; 1 40 mm quad mount; 4 40 mm twin mounts; 10 20 mm single mounts

USS Gage (APA-168) was a Haskell-class attack transport in service with the United States Navy from 1944 to 1947. Gage was the sole remaining example of the 117-ship Haskell-class and was scrapped in 2009.

== History ==
Gage was of the VC2-S-AP5 Victory ship design type and was named after Gage County, Nebraska. She was built under United States Maritime Commission contract by the Oregon Shipbuilding Corporation, Portland, Oregon; launched 14 October 1944; sponsored by Mrs. H. L. Edmunds; acquired by the Navy 4 November 1944; and commissioned 12 November 1944. Commodore Leroy John Alexanderson, USNR, was the first commanding officer of the USS Gage.

After shakedown out of San Diego, California, Gage sailed from San Francisco 17 January 1945 for the South Pacific. Following the landing of a military civil affairs group at Kaurimarau, Russell Islands, she arrived off West Kokum Beach, Guadalcanal, Solomon Islands, 4 February 1945 with 298 Marines and military cargo. She became a unit of Division 34, Transport Squadron 12, and spent the ensuing weeks in amphibious warfare maneuvers in the Solomons. On 15 March 1945, the attack transport departed Guadalcanal for Ulithi, the staging base for the Okinawa invasion. From there she sailed to Hagushi Beach, Okinawa, where she joined in the initial assault 1 April 1945 conducted under cover of heavy naval gun and plane bombardment.

Through five grueling days and nights of almost continual "Flash Red" alerts against Japanese suicide planes, Gage landed marines of the 3rd Battalion, 4th Marine Regiment, 6th Division; a Navy construction battalion; a medical company, and combat equipment. Her mission completed 5 April, she proceeded via the Marianas and Hawaii to San Francisco, where she arrived 11 May 1945. Here Gage embarked the men and equipment of an Army Air Corps Casuals and landed them at Manila, Luzon, Philippine Islands, 12 June 1945.

Gage reported for duty with Amphibious Group 9 at Leyte 22 June 1945 and was dispatched to New Guinea. After embarking troops at Langemak and Humboldt Bays for transport to Iloilo, Panay Island, P.I., she steamed to San Francisco, Calif., where she arrived 2 August 1945. The announcement of Japanese capitulation found her under repair in Todd's Dry Dock at Seattle, Washington.

Gage stood out from Seattle 21 August 1945 with 1,724 Army casual replacements who disembarked at Saipan in the Marianas 5 September. Thirteen days later she departed with some 1,500 marines whom she landed late in October as part of the occupation forces at Hiro Wan, Honshū, Japan. Homeward bound, she served as the "Magic-Carpet" for 1,700 Army veterans embarked at Okinawa and Manila. She reached Portland, Oregon 14 December 1945. The attack transport made a "Magic-Carpet" voyage from San Francisco to Yokosuka and back (10 January to 25 February 1946); followed by one to Samar, P.I., and back (4 April to 10 May 1946). She again departed San Francisco 28 May 1946 to support Navy occupation forces at the Chinese ports of Qingdao and Tientsin and the Japanese ports of Yokosuka and Sasebo.

Gage departed Sasebo 26 June; embarked Army veterans in the Marianas and Hawaii; then transited the Panama Canal for Norfolk, arriving 29 July 1946.

=== Decommissioning and fate ===
Gage remained in the Norfolk Naval Shipyard until decommissioning 26 February 1947. Gage was placed in the Atlantic Reserve Fleet and was inactive until her name was struck from the Naval Vessel Register 1 October 1958. She was transferred the same day to the Maritime Commission Reserve Fleet and was berthed in James River, Virginia. One of the crew members was Albert Viola.

Gage was slated to be used as a target in SINKEX 2004. This was cancelled pending historical review, and she remained in the James River Reserve Fleet. There was an effort underway to preserve Gage, the last ship remaining in the Haskell-class configuration, as a museum ship. The 29 February 2008 MARAD Inventory listed Gage with the status "Historic Hold" (previously she was listed for "Disposal"). The 30 April 2009 Inventory had her back in "Disposal" status. Gage left the James River Reserve Fleet on 23 July 2009, and was towed to Brownsville, Texas, where she was scrapped by ESCO Marine, Inc. Some items from the ship were salvaged to be used in the restoration of USS Texas (BB-35), a museum ship moored near Houston, Texas and Fletcher class destroyer USS Kidd (DD-661), a museum ship moored on the Mississippi River in Baton Rouge, Louisiana. Other items were acquired from the Gage several years prior to her scrapping for use on the Cannon-class destroyer escort USS Slater (DE-766), a museum ship moored in Albany, New York along with a plaque honoring Gage in the communications room presented by the USS Gage (APA-168) Association. In addition to the radios and other communications equipment on Slater, Gage was a source for many historical ship museums with which to backdate ships to WWII era design. In doing so, Gage herself had given up so much of her own equipment that by the time she was put on historical hold, she was stripped of so much equipment that it was hard to justify the expense of turning her into a museum ship. Her legacy stands not so much as a warship, but as a donor to help preserve other ships to reflect a time in which those ships would otherwise have been preserved in a more modern appearance from the mid-1940s WWII timeframe due to a lack of available obsolete equipment.

== Awards ==
Gage received one battle star for World War II service.
