= James Harvey Tomb =

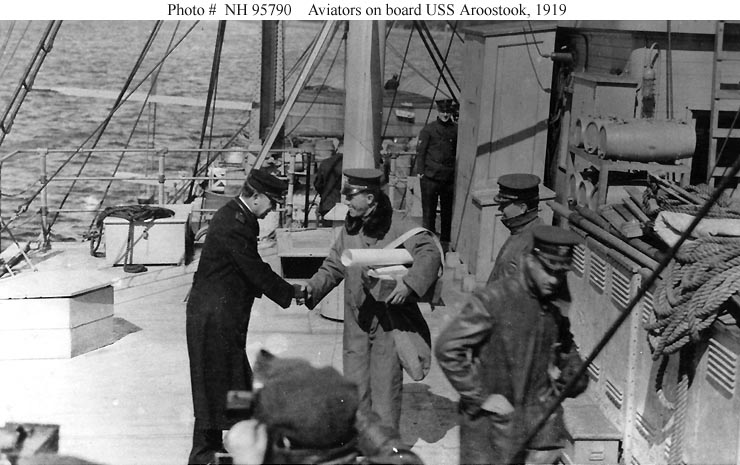
- Captain James. H. Tomb, Commanding Officer of USS Aroostook (ID # 1256), shakes hands with Lieutenant Commander Patrick N.L. Bellinger (May 1919)
- Born: September 2, 1876; St. Louis, Missouri
- Died: September 23, 1946 (aged 70); St. Albans, Queens, New York
- Military career
- Allegiance: United States of America
- Branch: United States Navy
- Rank: Captain
- Commands: Superintendent, US Merchant Marine Academy
- Conflicts: World War I Spanish American War Boxer Rebellion

Captain James Harvey Tomb (September 2, 1876 – September 23, 1946) served as superintendent of the New York State Merchant Marine Academy and was appointed the first superintendent of the United States Merchant Marine Academy on April 15, 1942.

Tomb successfully blended two maritime careers – 27 years as a naval officer and 15 years as an educator of Merchant Marine cadets.

== US Navy and Merchant Marine ==
An Annapolis graduate and expert marksman, Captain Tomb had a distinguished naval career. He commanded the destroyer USS Hull from June 14, 1907, to October 15, 1907, and the USS Chauncey from July 20, 1908, to June 9, 1909.

During the First World War he commanded the former coastal liner USS Aroostook during the laying of the North Sea Mine Barrage, which bottled up the German fleet.

Retiring from the Navy in 1925, he was named head of the New York State Nautical School (later renamed State University of New York Maritime College).

== Superintendent New York State Merchant Marine Academy ==
Captain Tomb served as the superintendent of the New York State Merchant Marine Academy (NYSMMA), now known as the State University of New York Maritime College From 1927 until 1942. During this time, he aided in finding and moving the academy from its home aboard ship pierside in New York Harbor to its permanent and current home at Fort Schuyler in the Bronx. As a member of the 1930 Committee on Training of Merchant Marine Officer Personnel, he strongly supported the need for a national shoreside training facility. In 1939, when the U.S. Merchant Marine Cadet Corps was searching for an Atlantic Coast location, he allowed the cadets to stay temporarily at the New York Maritime College campus at Fort Schuyler in the Bronx.

== Superintendent of the US Merchant Marine Academy ==
Captain Tomb's experience as a marine educator and administrator made Captain Tomb the academy's choice as the first superintendent of the United States Merchant Marine Academy in 1942. Arriving at Kings Point by boat from Fort Schuyler on April 15, 1942, at the age of 66, he immediately tackled the crucial task of overseeing the physical construction of the academy. He relinquished command of the academy on October 16, 1943, just over two weeks after the school was dedicated.

He retired to private life and served as Commander General of the Naval Order of the United States from 1943 until his death on September 23, 1946.

The football and lacrosse game field at Kings Point, set inside the academy's track, is named for Captain Tomb.

== Military awards ==
Captain Tomb's personal decorations included:

- Navy Cross
- Spanish Campaign Medal
- Philippine Campaign Medal
- Mexican Service Medal
- First World War Victory Medal

== Dates of rank ==
- Captain:

== See also ==
- United States Merchant Marine Academy
- List of presidents and superintendents of the State University of New York Maritime College and preceding organizations
- State University of New York Maritime College

Preceded by CDR E. V. W. Keen USNR	Superintendent, New York State Merchant Marine Academy; 1927-1942	Succeeded by VADM T. T. Craven USN(ret.)

Preceded by None	Superintendent, US Merchant Marine Academy; April 15, 1942-October 16, 1943	Succeeded by Rear Admiral Giles C. Stedman, USNR
