= USS Bailey =

Four ships of United States Navy have been named Bailey for Theodorus Bailey:

- USS Bailey (1856), was a United States Coast Survey schooner in the early years of the American Civil War.
- USS Bailey (TB-21), was a torpedo boat commissioned in 1901. She was renamed Coast Torpedo Boat No. 8 in 1918 and decommissioned in 1919.
- USS Bailey (DD-269), was a Clemson-class destroyer, commissioned in 1919 and transferred to the Royal Navy in 1940, where she served as HMS Reading.
- USS Bailey (DD-492), was a Benson-class destroyer, commissioned in 1942 and decommissioned in 1946.
