= Exxon Valdez =

Oil tanker, launched 1986, scrapped 2012

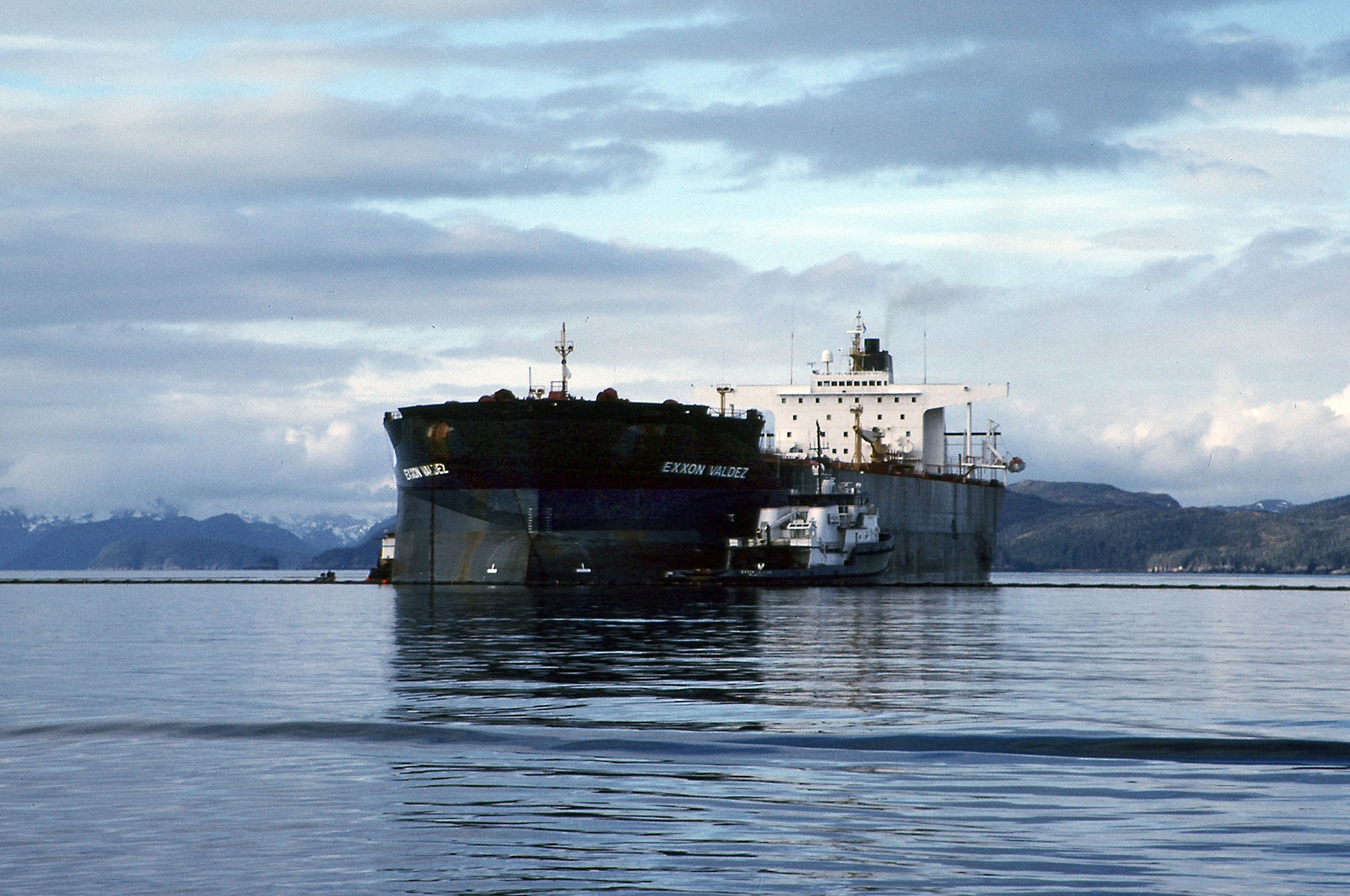
- The Exxon Valdez at Prince William Sound in 1989, hours after running aground

History
- Name: Exxon Valdez
- Owner: Hong Kong Bloom Shipping Ltd. (2008–2012); SeaRiver Maritime (1989–2008); Exxon (1986–1989)
- Port of registry: Panama (2008–2012); Marshall Islands (2005–2008); United States (1986–2005)
- Ordered: 1 August 1984
- Builder: National Steel and Shipbuilding Company; San Diego, California
- Laid down: 24 July 1985
- Launched: 14 October 1986
- Completed: 1986
- Maiden voyage: 1986
- In service: 11 December 1986 – 20 March 2012
- Out of service: 21 March 2012 (sold for scrap)
- Renamed: Exxon Valdez (1986–1990); Exxon Mediterranean (1990–1993); SeaRiver Mediterranean (later S/R Mediterranean) (1993–2005); Mediterranean (2005–2008); Dong Fang Ocean (2008–2011); Oriental Nicety (2011–2012); Oriental N (2012)
- Refit: 30 June 1989
- Identification: Maritime call sign: 3EPL6; IMO number: 8414520; MMSI number: 356270000
- Fate: Scrapped at Alang, India in 2012.

General characteristics
- Class & type: VLCC oil tanker
- Type: ABS: A1, ore carrier, AMS, ACCU, GRAB 25
- Tonnage: 214,861 DWT
- Displacement: 240,291 long tons
- Length: 987 ft (301 m) overall
- Beam: 166 ft (51 m)
- Draft: 64.5 ft (19.7 m)
- Depth: 88 ft (27 m)
- Installed power: 31,650 bhp (23,600 kW) at 79 rpm
- Propulsion: Eight-cylinder, reversible, slow-speed Sulzer marine diesel engine
- Speed: 16.25 knots (30.1 km/h; 18.7 mph)
- Capacity: 1.48 million barrels (235,000 m^{3}) of crude oil
- Crew: 21

Exxon Valdez was an oil tanker that gained notoriety after running aground in Prince William Sound, spilling its cargo of crude oil into the sea. On 24 March 1989, while owned by the former Exxon Shipping Company, captained by Joseph Hazelwood and First Mate James Kunkel, and bound for Long Beach, California, the vessel ran aground on the Bligh Reef, resulting in the second largest oil spill in United States history. The size of the spill is estimated to have been 40,900 to 120,000 m^{3} (10.8 to 31.7 million US gal; 257,000 to 755,000 bbl). In 1989, the Exxon Valdez oil spill was listed as the 54th-largest spill in history.

== Carrier ==
The tanker was over 301 meters (987 ft 6 in) long, 51 meters (167 ft 4 in) wide, and 26 meters (85 ft 4 in), and was assessed at 214,861 DWT and a full-load displacement of 240,291 long tons (244,147 t). The ship was able to transport up to 235,000 m^{3} (1.48 million bbl) at a sustained speed of 30 kilometres per hour (16 kn; 19 mph), powered by a 23.60 MW (31,650 shp) diesel engine. Its hull design was of the single-hull type, constructed by National Steel and Shipbuilding Company in San Diego, California. It was a relatively new tanker at the time of the spill, having been delivered to Exxon on 16 December 1986.

== Incident and accidents ==
=== Oil spill ===
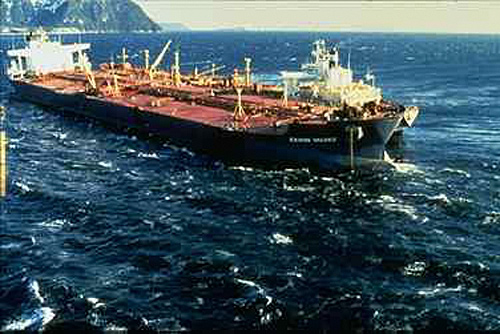
Exxon Valdez at Prince William Sound in 1989, 3 days after the spill began

At the time of the spill, Exxon Valdez was employed to transport crude oil from the Alyeska consortium's pipeline terminal in Valdez, Alaska, to the lower 48 states of the United States. At the time it ran aground, the vessel was carrying about 201,000 m^{3} (1.26 million bbl; 53 million US gal) of oil. After the spill, the vessel was towed to San Diego arriving on 10 June 1989, and repairs went underway on 30 June 1989. Approximately 1,600 tons of steel were removed and replaced that July, totaling US$30 million of repairs to the tanker. Its single-hull design remained unaltered.

The Exxon Valdez spill occurred under President George H. W. Bush, whose Environmental Protection Agency Administrator, William K. Reilly, reportedly played a significant role in mobilizing presidential support for action to contain and clean up the spill.

==== Litigation ====
Litigation was filed on behalf of 38,000 litigants. In 1994, a jury awarded plaintiffs US$287 million in compensatory damages and US$5 billion in punitive damages. Exxon appealed and the Ninth Circuit Court reduced the punitive damages to US$2.5 billion. Exxon then appealed the punitive damages to the Supreme Court which capped the damages to US$507.5 million in June, 2008. On 27 August 2008, Exxon Mobil agreed to pay 75% of the US$507.5 million damages ruling to settle the 1989 Exxon Valdez oil spill off Alaska. In June 2009, a federal ruling ordered Exxon to pay an additional US$480 million in interest on their delayed punitive damage awards.

=== Return to service ===
After repairs, Exxon Valdez was renamed as the Exxon Mediterranean, then SeaRiver Mediterranean in the early 1990s, when Exxon transferred its shipping business to a new subsidiary company, River Maritime Inc. The name was later shortened to S/R Mediterranean, then to simply Mediterranean in 2005. Although Exxon tried briefly to return the ship to its North American fleet, it was prohibited by law from returning to Prince William Sound even though its sister ship with the same design, Exxon Long Beach, never left that route. It then served in Europe, the Middle East and Asia. In 2002, the ship was again removed from service.

In 2005, it began operating under the Marshall Islands flag of convenience. Since then, European Union regulations have also prevented vessels with single-hull designs such as the Valdez from entering European ports. In early 2008, SeaRiver Maritime, an ExxonMobil subsidiary, sold Mediterranean to the Hong Kong–based shipping company, Hong Kong Bloom Shipping Ltd., which renamed the ship, once again, to Dong Fang Ocean (Chinese: 东方海; lit. 'Oriental Sea'), under Panama registry. In 2008, it was refitted and converted from an oil tanker to an ore carrier. Hong Kong Bloom Shipping is a subsidiary of Chinese government-owned company China Ocean Shipping (Group) Corporation (COSCO).

=== Collision with MV Aali ===
On 29 November 2010, Dong Fang Ocean collided in the South China Sea with the Malta-flagged cargo ship, Aali. Both vessels were severely damaged in the incident, and Aali was towed to Weihai and Dong Fang Ocean was towed to Longyan Port in Shandong.

=== Retirement ===
In March 2012, Dong Fang Ocean was purchased by Global Marketing Systems, Inc. for scrap at an estimated US$16 million and sailed under its own power to a ship breaker in Singapore. It changed hands again among scrap merchants (a common occurrence) and was eventually routed to Alang, India, under the ownership of Priya Blue Industries and at some point renamed Oriental Nicety. Before being beached, some tried to halt the action, arguing that the vessel was in breach of the Basel Convention. On 30 July 2012, the Supreme Court of India granted permission for the owners of Oriental Nicety to beach her on the Gujarat coast to be dismantled. She was then beached at Alang on 2 August 2012.

== In Popular Culture ==
Exxon Valdez was featured in 1995 post-apocalyptic film Waterworld as the repurposed ship of the "smokers." The film also contains references to real-world captain of Exxon Valdez, Joseph Hazelwood, with some characters referring to him as "Saint Joe." A photograph of him is featured aboard the ship.
