= USS St. Mary's (1844) =

Sloop-of-war of the United States Navy

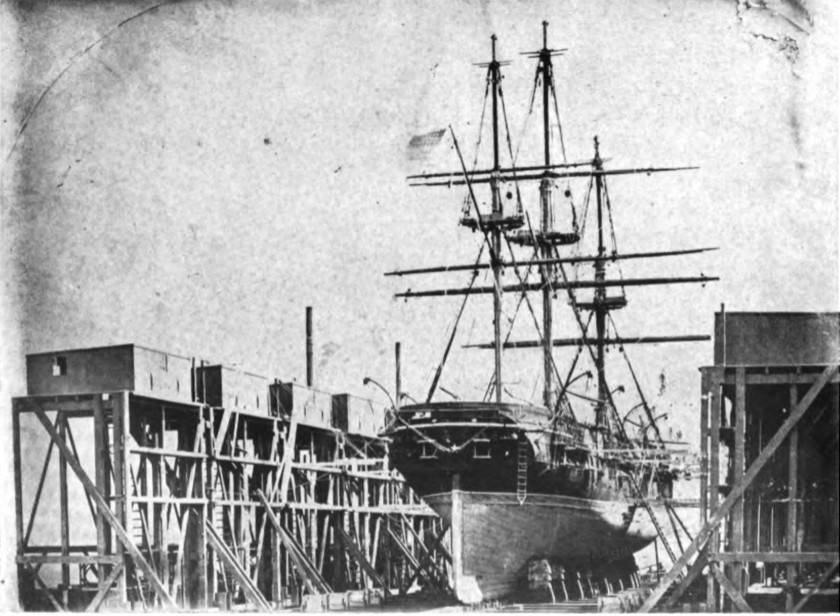
- USS St. Mary's in drydock at Mare Island Naval Shipyard, ca. 1854

History

United States
- Name: USS St. Mary's
- Builder: Patterson shipright St Mary's Georgia
- Laid down: 1843
- Launched: 1844
- Commissioned: 1844
- Decommissioned: 1873
- Fate: Scrapped, 1908

General characteristics
- Type: Sloop-of-war
- Displacement: 958 long tons (973 t)
- Length: 149 ft 3 in (45.49 m)
- Beam: 37 ft 4 in (11.38 m)
- Draft: 18 ft (5.5 m)
- Propulsion: Sail
- Complement: 195 officers and enlisted
- Armament: 16 × 32-pounder guns; 6 × 8 in (200 mm) Paixhans guns

The second USS St. Mary's was a sloop-of-war in the United States Navy.

St. Mary's was built in 1843–44 at the Washington Navy Yard, Washington, D.C., was commissioned in the fall of 1844, Commander John L. Saunders in command.

== Service history ==
=== Gulf of Mexico, 1844–1846 ===
Designated initially for duty with the Mediterranean Squadron, St. Mary's was at Philadelphia, Pennsylvania awaiting the sailing of her squadron, under Commodore Robert Stockton, when tension over Mexican-Texan-American territorial disputes heightened during the winter of 1845. On 1 March, President John Tyler signed a joint resolution of Congress recommending the annexation of Texas. By the end of the month, Mexico had severed diplomatic relations with the new James Polk Administration, and Stockton's Squadron was ordered south to reinforce that of Commodore David Conner in the Gulf of Mexico.

At the end of April, Stockton's ships sailed to Galveston, Texas where they stood by as a Texas convention voted on acceptance of the resolution. On 3 July, St. Mary's, detached from duty off Galveston, was ordered to join Conner's Squadron. On the 4th, the Texas convention approved the annexation resolution and St. Mary's headed east, to New Orleans, Louisiana, to escort transports carrying U.S. Army units to Texas. The troops, under General Zachary Taylor, were embarked on the 22nd and 23rd; and, by the 25th, were encamped on St. Joseph Island, near Corpus Christi, Texas. St. Mary's then stood by, off that town, as Conner's ships took station off Vera Cruz.

In September, the Polk Administration attempted to reopen diplomatic channels with Mexico. Negotiations were carried on into November, when St. Mary's was called on to carry a new United States minister, John Slidell, to Mexico. On 30 November, Slidell was disembarked at Vera Cruz; however, after making his way to Mexico City, he was refused recognition by the Herrera government.

Through the winter of 1846, St. Mary's continued to cruise in the Gulf of Mexico. In February, she carried dispatches between Conner and Taylor as attempts were made to pressure the Mexican government into reopening negotiations; but, in March, she arrived at the Antón Lizardo anchorage, whence she could institute a blockade of Tampico if the situation deteriorated into war. In mid-April, she sailed for Pensacola, Florida to take on water and provisions; and, by the time she returned in May, war had erupted.

=== Mexican–American War, 1846–1847 ===
On 19 May, St. Mary's anchored off the mouth of the Panuco River near Tampico. On the 20th, she proclaimed the blockade of that port and of the Mexican coast. In June, scurvy struck; but attempts were made to destroy Mexican gunboats and impede the reinforcement of the town's defenses. Through the summer, she maintained her part in the blockade; but, by September, the climate, disease, limited water and food, and relative inaction had taken its toll. Morale was low; and, on the 17th, Seaman Samuel Jackson was hanged for striking an officer and using "mutinous and seditious language".

A little over a month later, her blockade duty was interrupted, and the sloop was ordered back to the mouth of the Panuco River. On 14 November, she participated in the unopposed occupation of Tampico; then resumed blockade duties. In late December, she was ordered to Brazos Santiago, whence, in January 1847, she proceeded to Lobos to cover the movement of General Winfield Scott's troops. In early March, she escorted the transports into the Antón Lizardo anchorage. On the 8th, she moved toward Vera Cruz; and, on the 9th, her boats carried assault troops to Collado Beach, where Scott's force was landed, without resistance, in under five hours.

St. Mary's remained in the area through the end of the month to support the siege of the city. On the 22nd, one of her 8-inch guns, along with guns from other ships, was ferried ashore and placed on a ridge near Fort Santa Barbara to augment the Army's artillery. The bombardment of the city began the same day. On the 29th, the city was formally surrendered.

St. Mary's then retired to Antón Lizardo, whence she sailed toward Alvarado to assist in the taking of that town. By the time she arrived, however, the town had fallen; and she resumed blockade duties. On 10 April, she had been ordered back to the United States by the Secretary of the Navy; and, in early May, she sailed for Norfolk, Virginia, carrying captured Mexican guns as cargo.

=== Pacific Squadron, 1848–1872 ===
The sloop remained at Norfolk for almost a year. On 11 April 1848, she sailed for duty with the Pacific Squadron; and, for the next five years, she cruised from the coast of California to the coast of Chile, in the Central Pacific, and in the Far East. In 1853, she returned to the east coast of the United States; underwent repairs at Philadelphia; and returned to the Pacific in 1854. During the next two years, she cruised in the eastern and south Pacific; and, in December 1856, she put into Panama City where a new crew under Comdr. Charles Davis relieved that of Comdr. Theodorus Bailey.

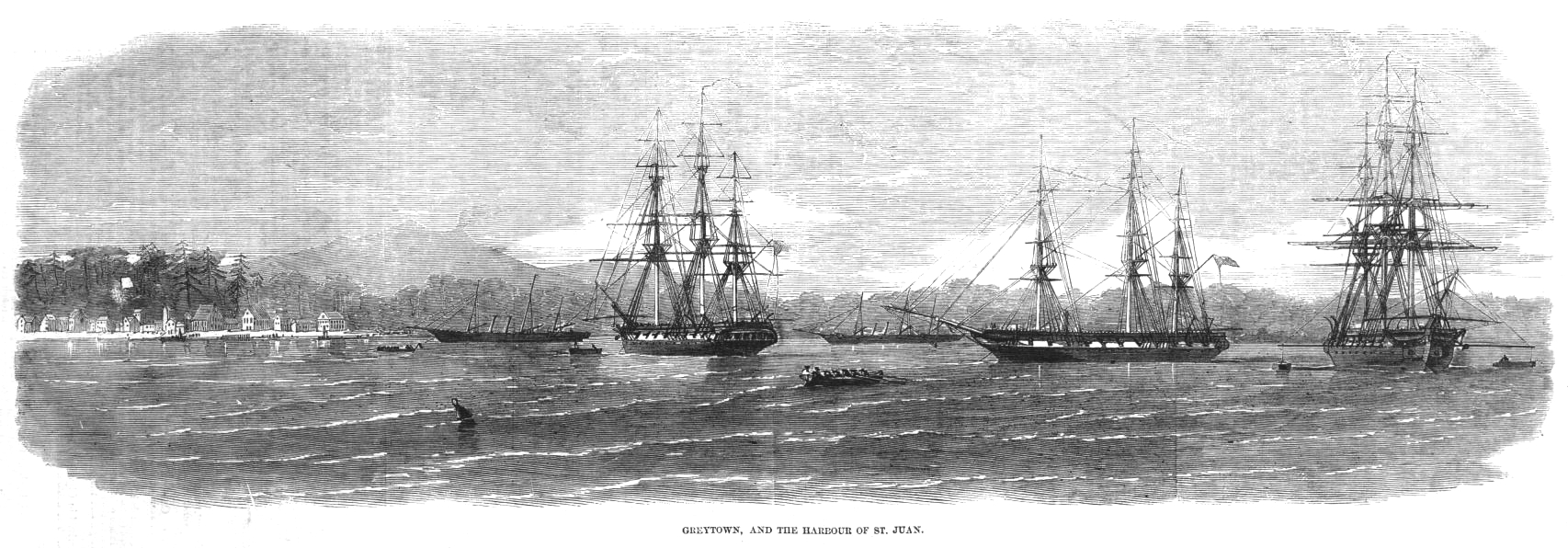
St. Mary's at Greytown, and the harbour of St. Juan in April 1857, when detaining General Walker

From New Granada (Panama), Davis took St. Mary's to the Jarvis and New Nantucket Islands, then returned to Central America to stand by, off Nicaragua, as William Walker fought to keep his empire there. On 6 February 1857, St. Mary's anchored at San Juan del Sur, where she remained into the spring as Davis sought to negotiate an end to the fighting. In early May, Walker surrendered to Davis. Walker and the other Americans in his army were taken on board St. Mary's and transported to Panama City, whence they were returned to the United States.

St. Mary's then resumed her cruise, collecting hydrographic and geologic data as she performed her other duties. In March 1858, she put into Mare Island, California, for a refit. Delayed, first by a lack of funds, then by desertions of shipyard mechanics and members of her own crew to the gold fields, she remained in the shipyard into the summer. In late August, she set sail again and headed south to cruise off Central America; and, in February 1859, her officers and crew were relieved at Panama City. She then sailed north to cruise along the Mexican coast as revolution spread in Mexico. In the fall of 1860, she returned to Panama City. There, with HMS Clio, she assisted local officials in quelling an insurrection.

A few months later, the Civil War divided the United States. Through that war, St. Mary's remained with the Pacific Squadron, protecting Union merchant shipping and searching for Confederate raiders. After the war, she cruised the Pacific until September 1866, then put into Mare Island where she was laid up for four years. In the fall of 1870, she returned to active service; and, after a cruise to Australia and New Zealand, she returned to Mare Island, whence in November 1872 she departed for Norfolk.

=== School Ship, 1873–1908 ===
On 3 June 1873, St. Mary's returned to Norfolk where she remained, in ordinary, until 1875. Then transferred to the New York Nautical School at New York (now the SUNY Maritime College) she served as a school ship until 1908. In June of that year, she was ordered sold. Despite efforts of alumni to preserve the ship they could not come up with the funding. Two months later, she was purchased by Thomas Butler and Company, Boston, Massachusetts; and in November, she was scrapped.

== See also ==
- Confederate States Navy
- Union Navy
