= State University of New York Maritime College =

Public maritime college in New York City

- Former names: New York Nautical School (1874–1913); New York State Nautical School (1913–1929); New York State Merchant Marine Academy (1929–1941); New York State Maritime Academy (1941–1949)
- Motto: Loyalty, Valor
- Type: Public maritime college
- Established: 1874; 152 years ago
- Parent institution: State University of New York
- President: John A. Okon
- Provost: Todd M. Lidh
- Students: 1,552 (fall 2025)
- Undergraduates: 1,402 (fall 2025)
- Postgraduates: 150 (fall 2025)
- Location: Fort Schuyler, Throggs Neck, The Bronx, New York City, New York, United States; 40°48′19″N 73°47′33″W
- Campus: 55 acres (22 ha); Urban
- Colors: Navy and crimson
- Nickname: Privateers
- Sporting affiliations: NCAA Division III, Skyline Conference
- Mascot: Privateer Pete
- Website: sunymaritime.edu

The State University of New York Maritime College (SUNY Maritime College) is a public maritime college in the Bronx, New York City. It is part of the State University of New York (SUNY) system. Founded in 1874, the SUNY Maritime College was the first college of its kind (federally approved, offering commercial nautical instruction) to be founded in the United States and is one of only seven degree-granting maritime academies in the United States.

== History ==
Maritime College is the oldest institution of its kind in the United States. Due in part to the Civil War, there was a decline in the American maritime industry and a growing concern about the professionalism of its officers. As a result, the New York Chamber of Commerce and maritime interests of the port of New York lobbied the state legislature to create a professional nautical school for the city. This was done in 1873, but the school lacked a ship. The chamber then teamed up with the noted naval education reformer and modernizer, Stephen B. Luce. Luce led the effort, and through his efforts an act was passed by Congress in 1874 that enabled individual states to request from the Navy retired or obsolete vessels to train seamen. The state of New York then appealed to the Navy for a training vessel. On December 14, 1874, the USS St. Mary's arrived in New York harbor and became the first home of the New York Nautical School, the college's initial name. Originally administered by the Board of Education of the City of New York, it was conducted as a grammar school that taught common school subjects (along with nautical classes) during the winter term, and then held practical cruises during the summer term. In time, the school began to teach more advanced professional subjects. During this early period, the school was typically run on an annual appropriation of $20,000 to $30,000 with the school often facing closure because the cost per pupil was much higher than in a regular public school, mainly due to the overhead of ship maintenance and student board.

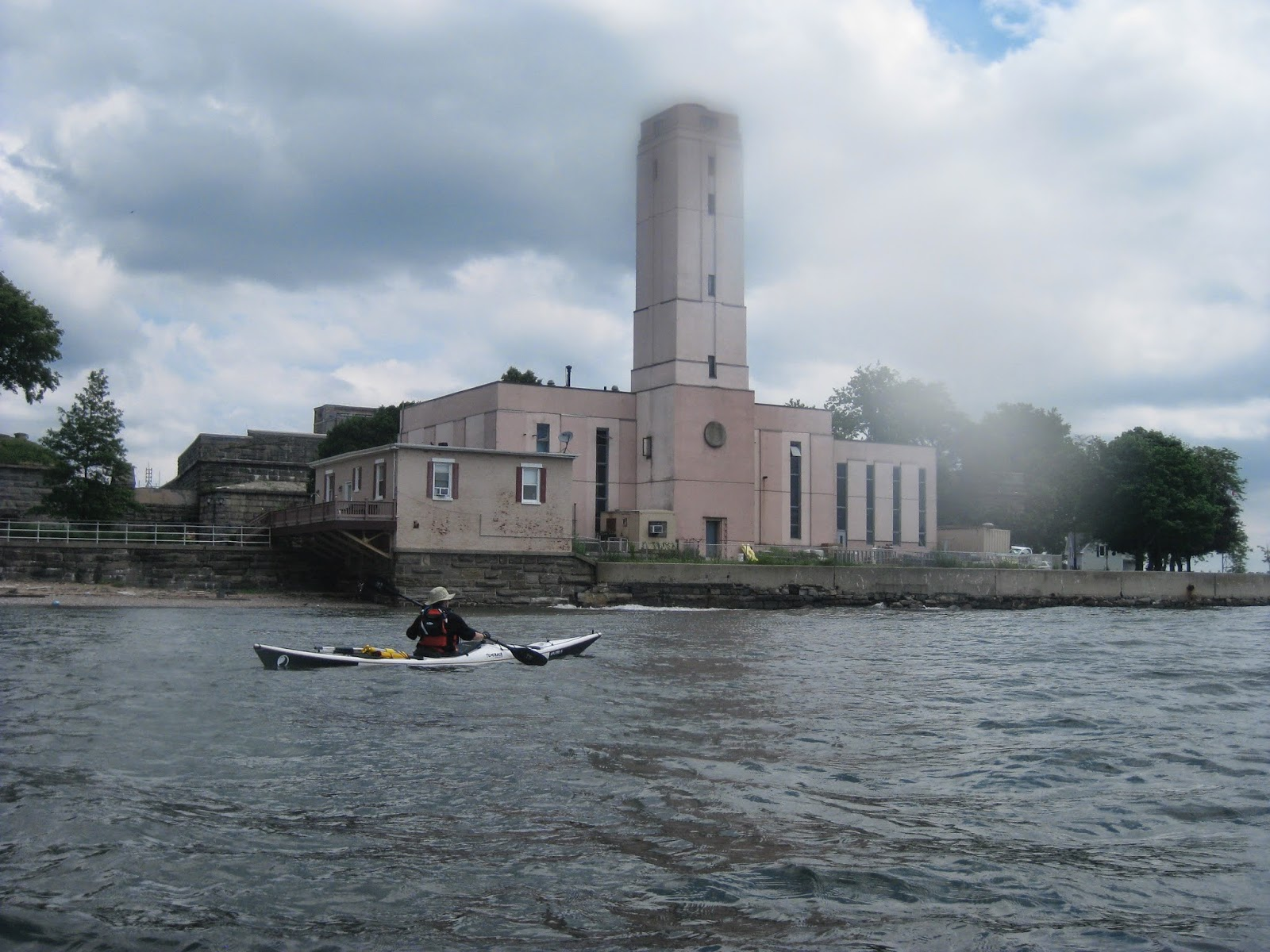
SUNY Maritime College from the shore

By 1907, the St. Mary's was replaced by the gunboat Newport, a sail-steam hybrid.

In 1913, New York City threatened to close the school due to its costs. However, the state of New York took over its management and renamed it the New York State Nautical School. Despite being a state institution, the school was almost closed in 1916, again for budgetary reasons, but efforts from the maritime industry and the school's alumni kept it alive. After this time, the American merchant marine grew and subsequently a greater demand for trained American merchant marine brought growth to the school.

During this period, the school was administered by a board of governors in addition to the superintendent.

In 1921, the school, which had for long moved from berth to berth, found itself at Bedloe's Island (now Liberty Island) in New York Harbor. There they were allowed to use the army facilities. Over time, conditions on the island were deemed inadequate to teach modern merchant mariners.

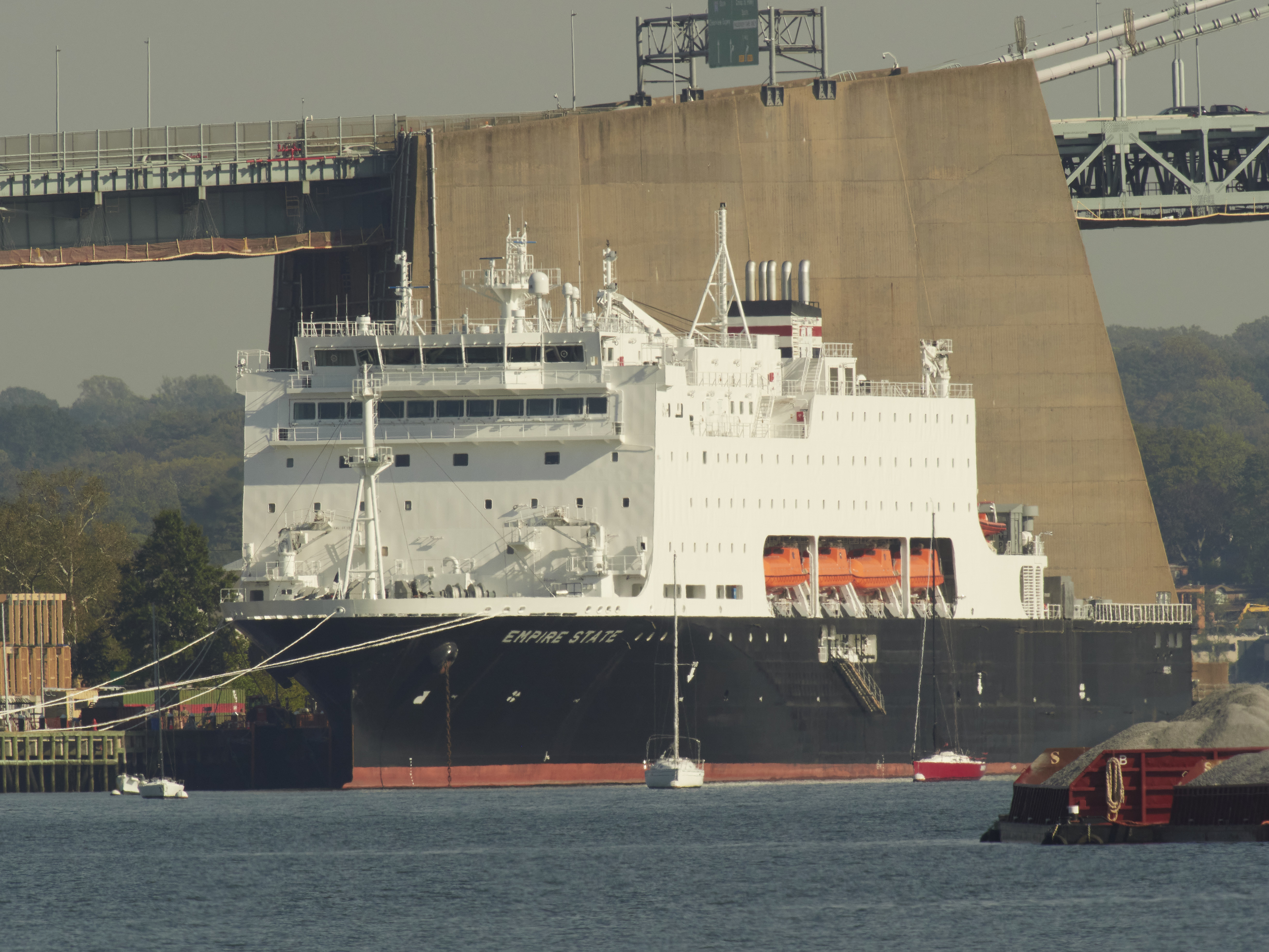
Empire State docked at SUNY Maritime. Throgs Neck Bridge is in the background.

With the growing demand, a push was made by then superintendent James Harvey Tomb beginning in 1927 to acquire a larger ship and a land-based institution. The ship came in the form of the Procyon, which was renamed the Empire State. This ship effectively doubled the size of the school.

The school, renamed the New York State Merchant Marine Academy in 1929, finally became land-based in 1938 at the Maritime College's present Throggs Neck campus in Fort Schuyler. One of Franklin D. Roosevelt's last acts as Governor of New York State was to sign the act turning Fort Schuyler and the Throggs Neck peninsula over to the school for use as a shore-based facility of higher education. Work restoring Fort Schuyler for the academy's use was done at first by the Temporary Emergency Relief Administration (TERA) in 1934 followed by the Works Progress Administration in 1935. The fort was restored, allowing the school to operate there by 1938. A third name change took place in 1941, when the school became the New York State Maritime Academy.

In 1946, degree conferring status was granted and the academy became a college. Two years later, the college was one of the original institutions incorporated into the State University of New York system. In 1949, just one year later, the newly minted university took on its current name, the State University of New York Maritime College.

== Academics ==
Undergraduate demographics as of fall 2023
Race and ethnicity	Total
White	65%
Hispanic	16%
Black	6%
Asian	4%
Unknown	4%
International student	3%
Two or more races	3%
Economic diversity
Low-income (Note: The percentage of students who received an income-based federal Pell grant intended for low-income students.)	22%
Affluent (Note: The percentage of students who are a part of the American middle class at the bare minimum.)	78%

All of the college's bachelor's degree programs may be combined with preparation for the professional license as a United States Merchant Marine Officer. The college also offers a master's degree in International Transportation Management and Maritime and Naval Studies, as well as several graduate Professional Mariner Training certificates. Most of the degree programs may be completed while concurrently preparing for the United States Merchant Marine officer's license as a third mate or third assistant engineer. Additionally, SUNY Maritime College has the only United States Navy/United States Marine Corps Reserve Officers Training Corps (ROTC) program in the metropolitan New York City area, which prepares enrollees for commissioned officer positions in the United States Navy and United States Marine Corps.

As of 2017, the graduates of SUNY Maritime College earned US$144,000, the highest average annual salary of any university graduates in the United States.

== Athletics ==
The Maritime Privateers compete in 16 NCAA Division III varsity sports (8 men's, 6 women's, 2 co-ed).

== Regiment ==
SUNY Maritime College has a regiment to fulfill the USCG requirements for obtaining a license through a college. The regiment has a Pipe and Drum Band, Regimental Band, Honor Guard (Color Guard and Drill Team), and a Security Company. The band and honor guard perform at events both on and off campus, such as parades and dinners.

Incoming Cadets must go through Indoctrination (shortened to INDOC), ten days of training in August where they learn leadership and basic seamanship skills. During freshman year, also known as Mariner Under Guidance (MUG) year, cadets are made to square corners, stand at attention for all upperclassmen, have room inspections, and maintain the uniform of the day.

== Notable alumni ==
- Leroy J. Alexanderson, commodore, the last master of the SS United States
- John W. Anderson, longest serving master of the SS United States
- Peter Coleman, class of 1981, won gold medal, Mallory Cup, in 1983 for North American Men's Sailing Championship, is named in the Inter-collegiate Sailing Association Hall of Fame
- John Ferriola, class of 1974, president and chief operating officer of Nucor
- Joseph Hazelwood, master of the Exxon Valdez
- Rick Hillenbrand, class of 1978, member of the West Virginia House of Representatives
- Gary Jobson, class of 1973, America's Cup tactician in 1977 for Ted Turner; self-proclaimed pre-eminent ambassador for sailing in the U.S.
- Scott Kelly, NASA astronaut, author, Endurance: A Year in Space, A Lifetime of Discovery
- Harry Manning, Class of 1914, master mariner, captain of the SS United States on her maiden Blue Riband Atlantic crossings, navigator for Amelia Earhart
- Ross Gilmore Marvin, class of 1902, accompanied Robert Peary on expeditions to the North Pole
- Kevin McCarey, environmentalist, author and Emmy Award-winning documentary filmmaker
- Dan Meuser, businessman and U.S. representative in Congress
- Ho Nieh, chair of the Nuclear Regulatory Commission
- Felix Riesenberg, class of 1897, master mariner, author
- Edward Villella, dancer and choreographer

== Notable attendees ==
- Geraldo Rivera (1961–1963), television journalist and former talk show host
- Louis E. Willett, private first class, U.S. Army; recipient of the Medal of Honor

== Gallery ==
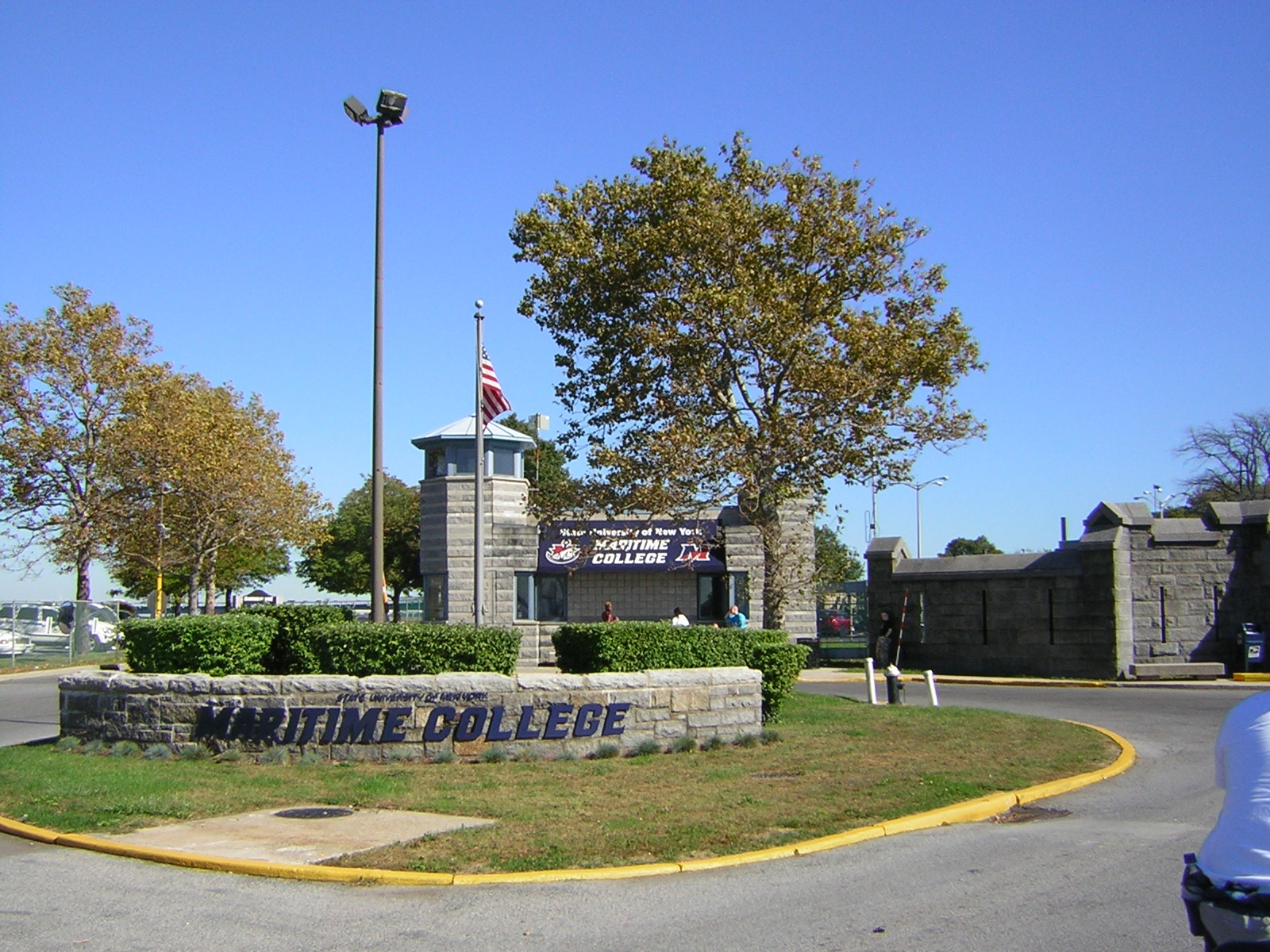
Front gate of SUNY Maritime College

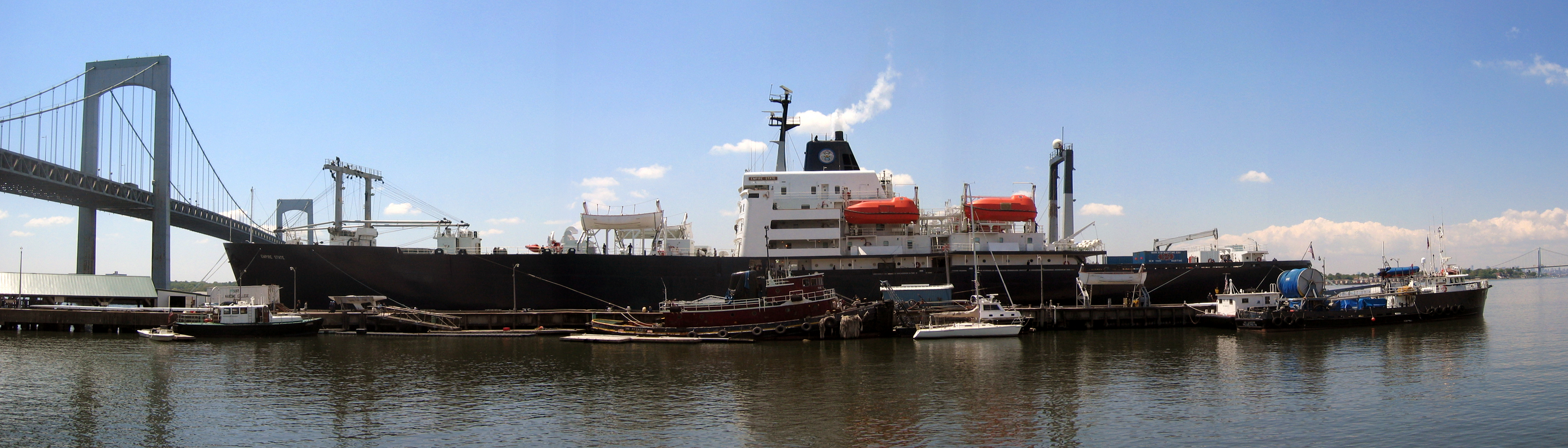
TS Empire State VI

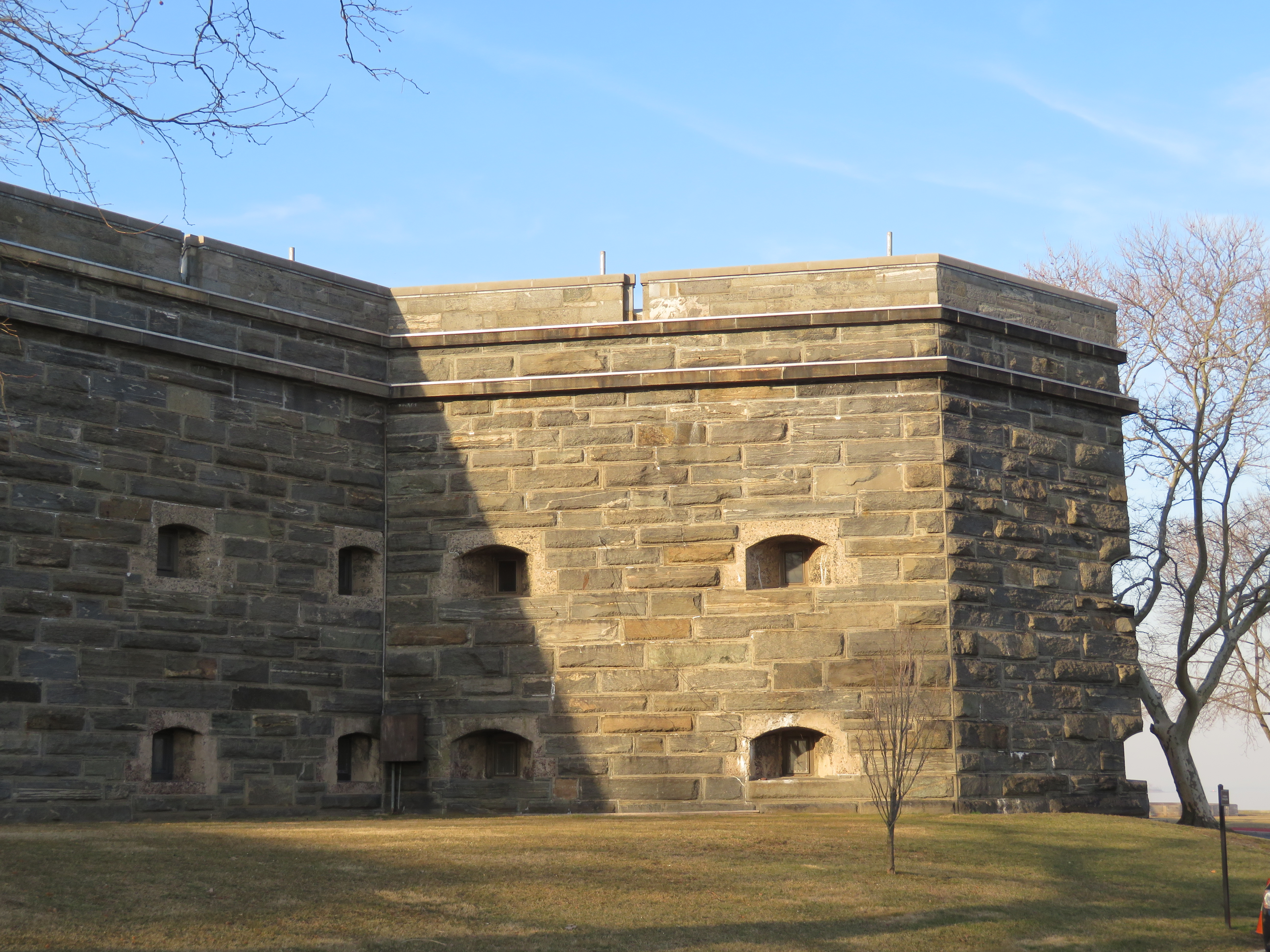
Fort Schuyler

== See also ==
- Fort Schuyler Museum
- List of presidents and superintendents of the State University of New York Maritime College and preceding organizations
- List of training ships of the State University of New York Maritime College and preceding organizations
