= USS Procyon (AG-11) =

Cargo ship of the United States Navy

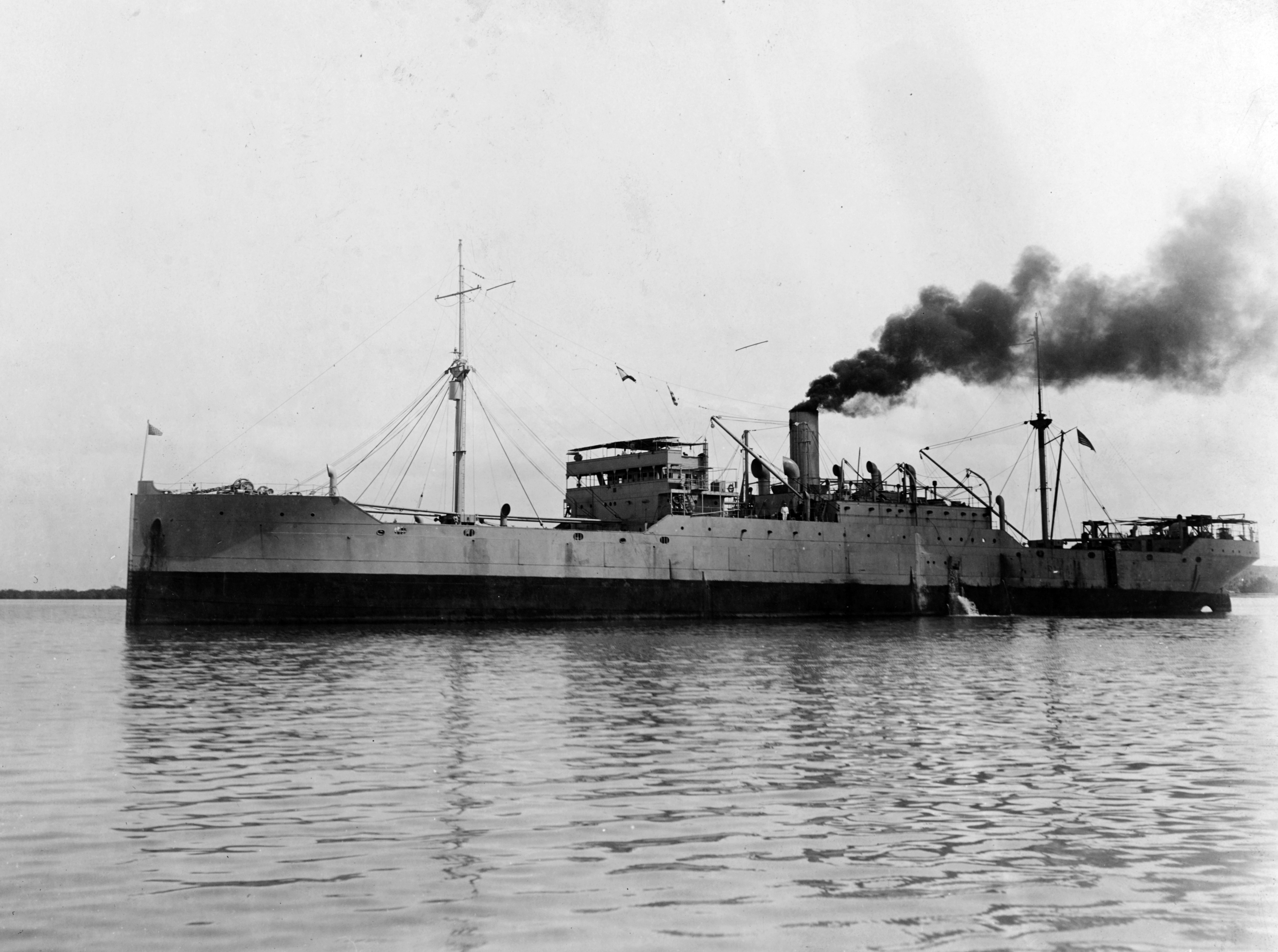

History

United States
- Name: USS Procyon
- Namesake: Procyon
- Builder: American International Shipbuilding, Hog Island, Philadelphia, Pennsylvania
- Laid down: 1919
- Launched: 13 May 1919
- Acquired: 8 November 1921
- Commissioned: 30 November 1921
- Decommissioned: 1 April 1931
- Renamed: TS Empire State (IX-38), 15 July 1931; TS American Pilot, circa 1941
- Fate: Sold for scrapping, 3 March 1948

General characteristics
- Class & type: Antares-class cargo ship
- Displacement: 4,060 long tons (4,125 t)
- Length: 380 ft (120 m)
- Beam: 54 ft 2 in (16.51 m)
- Draft: 9 ft 8 in (2.95 m)
- Speed: 11.5 knots (21.3 km/h; 13.2 mph)
- Complement: 218

USS Procyon (AG–11) was an Antares-class cargo ship in the United States Navy after World War I. She later served as a training vessel for the Merchant Marine Academy as Empire State. In 1940 the ship was returned to the United States Maritime Commission, was renamed American Pilot, and sailed under the American flag during World War II. She was scrapped in 1948.

== Service history ==
Procyon was built in 1919 by the American International Shipbuilding Corp., Hog Island, Pennsylvania, and launched as the SS Shaume; taken over by the Navy on 8 November 1921 from the U.S. Shipping Board, under executive order of 29 October 1921; and commissioned on 30 November 1921. Procyon served as flagship of Commander Fleet Base Force, U.S. Battle Fleet, until she was decommissioned on 1 April 1931.

Inspected by the State Education Department of New York, she was found suitable for use as a Merchant Marine Academy training vessel; and, by request of Governor Franklin D. Roosevelt, she was renamed Empire State (IX-38) and turned over to the state of New York on 15 July 1931. She served as a school ship for the academy until 11 April 1940, when she was transferred to the Maritime Commission.

The ship was renamed American Pilot and sailed under the American flag during World War II. In the third quarter of 1948, American Pilot was scrapped at Wilmington, Delaware.
