= Exxon Valdez oil spill =

1989 industrial disaster in Alaska

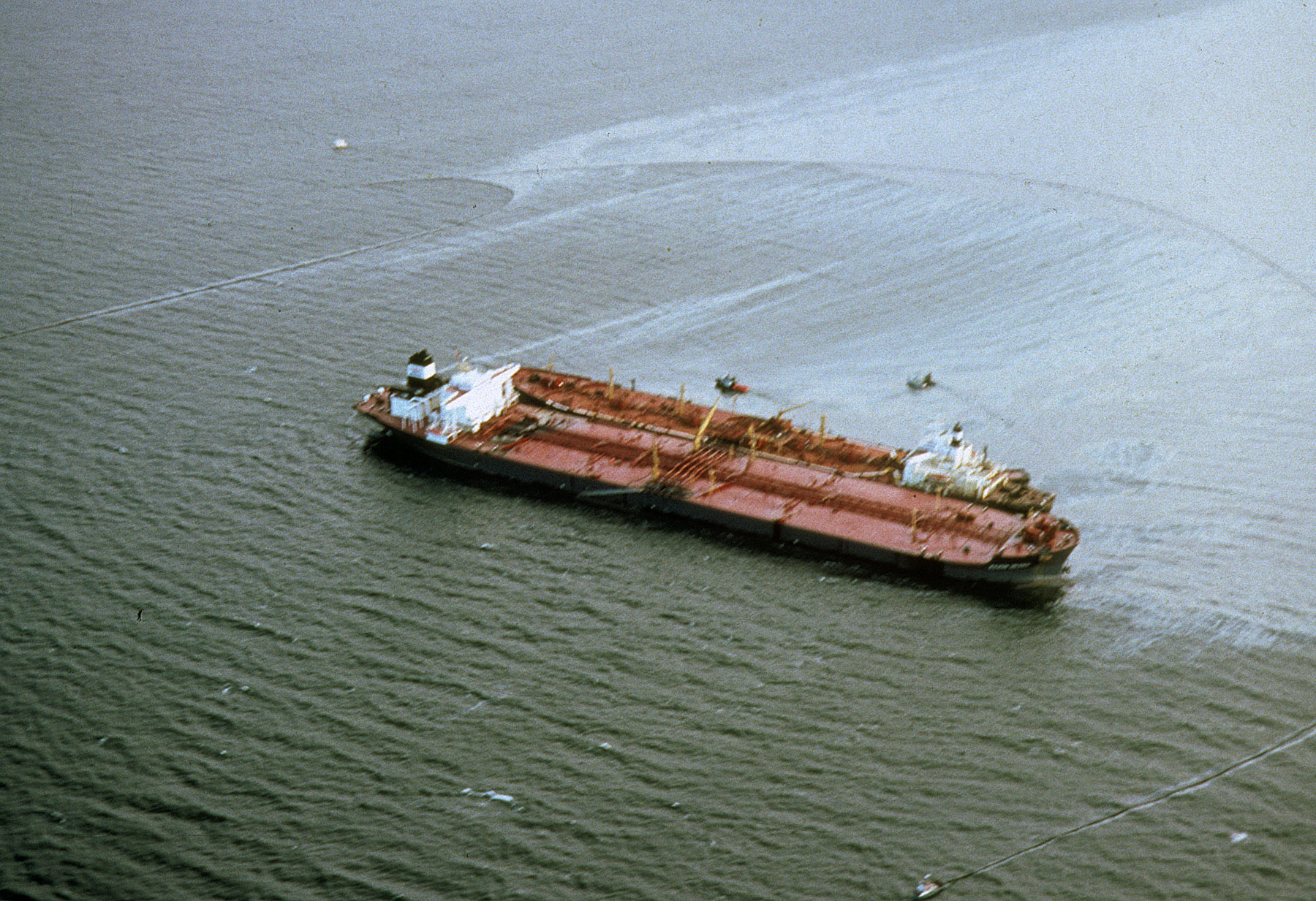
- The Exxon Valdez offloading oil to the Exxon Baton Rouge as oil leaks into the surrounding waters
- Interactive map of Exxon Valdez oil spill
- Location: Prince William Sound, Alaska
- Coordinates: 60.8400°N 146.8625°W
- Date: March 24, 1989; 37 years ago

Cause
- Cause: Grounding of the Exxon Valdez oil tanker
- Operator: Exxon Shipping Company

Spill characteristics
- Volume: 10.8×10^{6} US gal (260,000 bbl; 41,000 m^{3}) (or 37,000 metric tonnes)
- Shoreline impacted: 1,300 mi (2,100 km)

The Exxon Valdez oil spill was a major environmental disaster that occurred in Alaska's Prince William Sound on March 24, 1989. The spill occurred when Exxon Valdez, an oil supertanker owned by Exxon Shipping Company, bound for Long Beach, California, struck Prince William Sound's Bligh Reef, 6 mi (9.7 km) west of Tatitlek, Alaska, at 12:04 a.m. The tanker spilled more than 10 million US gallons (240,000 bbl) (or 37,000 tonnes) of crude oil over the next few days.

The Exxon Valdez spill is the second largest in U.S. waters, after the 2010 Deepwater Horizon oil spill, in terms of volume of oil released. It is the costliest disaster ever with no direct human fatalities. Prince William Sound's remote location, accessible only by helicopter, plane, or boat, made government and industry response efforts difficult and made existing response plans especially hard to implement. The region is a habitat for salmon, sea otters, seals, and seabirds. The oil, extracted from the Prudhoe Bay Oil Field, eventually affected 1,300 miles (2,100 km) of coastline, of which 200 miles (320 km) were heavily or moderately oiled.

== Spill ==
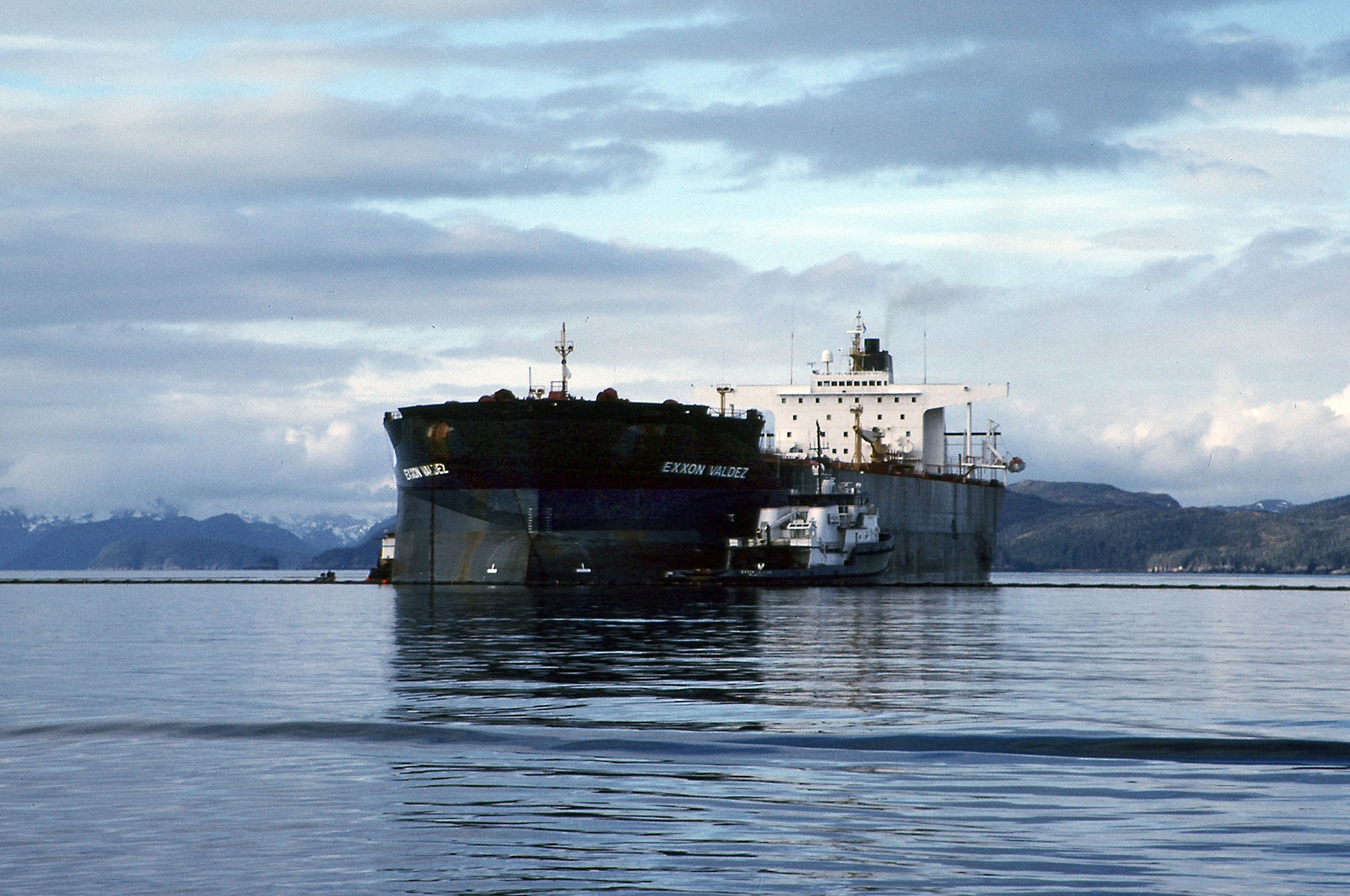
The Exxon Valdez a few hours after it was grounded.

Exxon Valdez was carrying 53.1 million US gallons (1,260,000 bbl; 201,000 m^{3}) of oil, of which approximately 10.8 million US gallons (260,000 bbl; 41,000 m^{3}) were spilled into the Prince William Sound.

The ship docked at the Valdez Marine Terminal at 11:30 p.m. on March 22, 1989. Loading of crude oil was completed late in the day on the 23rd. The tanker left the terminal at 9:12 p.m., March 23, 1989 (the deck log shows that it was clear of the dock at 9:21 p.m.), loaded with 53,094,510 gallons (1,264,155 barrels) of crude oil. Captain Joseph Hazelwood retired to his cabin at 9:25 p.m. Harbor pilot William Murphy and Third Mate Gregory Cousins were on the bridge while the tanker was accompanied by a single tug for the passage through the Valdez Narrows – a journey of about 7 miles. The pilot left the bridge shortly after the vessel left the narrows, at 11:24 p.m. At this point, the captain was called to the bridge. Cousins helped the pilot disembark from the vessel, leaving the captain as the only officer on the bridge. At 11:25 p.m. Exxon Valdez reported that the pilot had left. The captain advised traffic control and the ship maneuvered out of the outbound traffic lane in the Traffic Separation Scheme (TSS) to avoid small icebergs; a common occurrence since the Columbia Glacier calved such icebergs nearby. The vessel was placed on a due south course and set on autopilot. At 11:47 p.m. the vessel left the traffic lane's eastern boundary. Following the maneuver, Hazelwood departed the navigation bridge and retired to his stateroom for the night.

He left Third Mate Gregory Cousins in charge of the navigation bridge and Able Seaman Robert Kagan at the helm with instructions to the third mate to return to the southbound traffic lane in the TSS at a prearranged point. Third Mate Cousins had been on duty for six hours and was scheduled to be relieved by Second Mate Lloyd LeCain Jr. However, due to the long hours that the second mate had worked, Cousins was reluctant to wake him, and remained on duty. Cousins was the only officer on the bridge for most of the night, in violation of company policy. At around midnight on March 24, Cousins began to maneuver the vessel into the traffic lanes. At the same time, the lookout reported that the Bligh Reef light appeared far off the starboard bow at 45 degrees – this was problematic given that the light should have been off the port side. Cousins ordered a course change because the ship was in danger. Captain Hazelwood was phoned by Cousins, but before their conversation could finish, the ship grounded. At 12:04 a.m., accompanied by what the helmsman and Cousins described as "a bumpy ride" and "six very sharp jolts" respectively, the ship ran hard aground on Bligh Reef.

Carried by its own momentum, the ship ended up perched on its middle on a pinnacle of rock. Eight out of 11 cargo holds were punctured. 5.8 million gallons of oil drained from the ship within three hours and 15 minutes. Thirty minutes after numerous attempts to dislodge the ship under its own power, Captain Hazelwood radioed the Coast Guard informing them of the grounding. For more than 45 minutes after the grounding, the captain attempted to maneuver free of the reef despite being informed by First Mate James Kunkel that the vessel was not structurally sound without the reef supporting it.

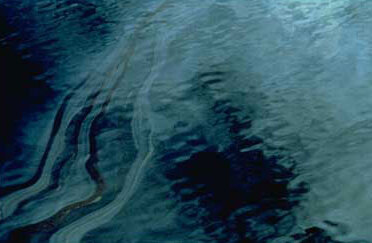
During the first few days of the spill, heavy sheens of oil covered large areas of the surface of Prince William Sound.

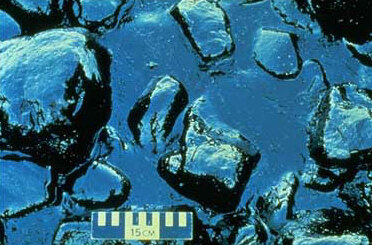
Beginning three days after the vessel grounded, a storm pushed large quantities of fresh oil onto the rocky shores of many of the beaches in the Knight Island chain. In this photograph, pooled black oil is shown stranded in the rocks

Multiple factors have been identified as contributing to the incident:

- Exxon Shipping Company failed to supervise the master (ship's captain) and provide a rested and sufficient crew for Exxon Valdez. The NTSB found this practice was widespread throughout the industry, prompting a safety recommendation to Exxon and to the industry.
- The third mate failed to properly maneuver the vessel, possibly due to fatigue or excessive workload.
- Exxon Shipping Company failed to properly maintain the Raytheon Collision Avoidance System (RAYCAS) radar, which, if functional, would have indicated to the third mate an impending collision with the Bligh Reef by detecting the radar reflector placed on the next rock inland from Bligh Reef for the purpose of keeping ships on course. This cause was brought forward by Greg Palast and is not presented in the official accident report.

Captain Hazelwood, who was widely reported to have been drinking heavily in a Valdez bar earlier that evening before the vessel left port, was not at the controls when the ship struck the reef shortly after midnight. Despite the fact that he was not on the bridge at the time of the accident, Exxon blamed Hazelwood for the grounding of the tanker and fired him from the company. He accused the corporation of making him a scapegoat. Hazelwood was charged with criminal mischief, reckless endangerment, and piloting a vessel while intoxicated, but in a 1990 trial, he was cleared of the three charges. He was convicted of misdemeanor negligent discharge of oil. At trial, 21 witnesses testified that he did not appear to be under the influence of alcohol around the time of the accident.

Journalist Greg Palast stated in 2008:

Forget the drunken skipper fable. As to Captain Joe Hazelwood, he was below decks, sleeping off his bender. At the helm, the third mate may never have collided with Bligh Reef had he looked at his RAYCAS radar. But the radar was not turned on. In fact, the tanker's radar was left broken and disabled for more than a year before the disaster, and Exxon management knew it. It was just too expensive to fix and operate.

Other factors, according to an MIT course entitled "Software System Safety" by Professor Nancy G. Leveson, included:

1. Ships were not informed that the previous practice of the Coast Guard tracking ships out to Bligh Reef had ceased.
2. The oil industry promised, but never installed, state-of-the-art iceberg monitoring equipment.
3. Exxon Valdez was sailing outside the normal sea lane to avoid small icebergs thought to be in the area.
4. Coast Guard vessel inspections in Valdez were not performed, and the number of staff was reduced.
5. Lack of available equipment and personnel hampered the spill cleanup.

This disaster resulted in International Maritime Organization introducing comprehensive marine pollution prevention rules (MARPOL) through various conventions. The rules were ratified by member countries and, under International Ship Management rules, the ships are being operated with a common objective of "safer ships and cleaner oceans."

In 2009, Captain Hazelwood offered a "heartfelt apology" to the people of Alaska, suggesting he had been wrongly blamed for the disaster: "The true story is out there for anybody who wants to look at the facts, but that's not the sexy story and that's not the easy story," he said. Hazelwood said he felt Alaskans always gave him a fair shake.

== Clean-up and major effects ==
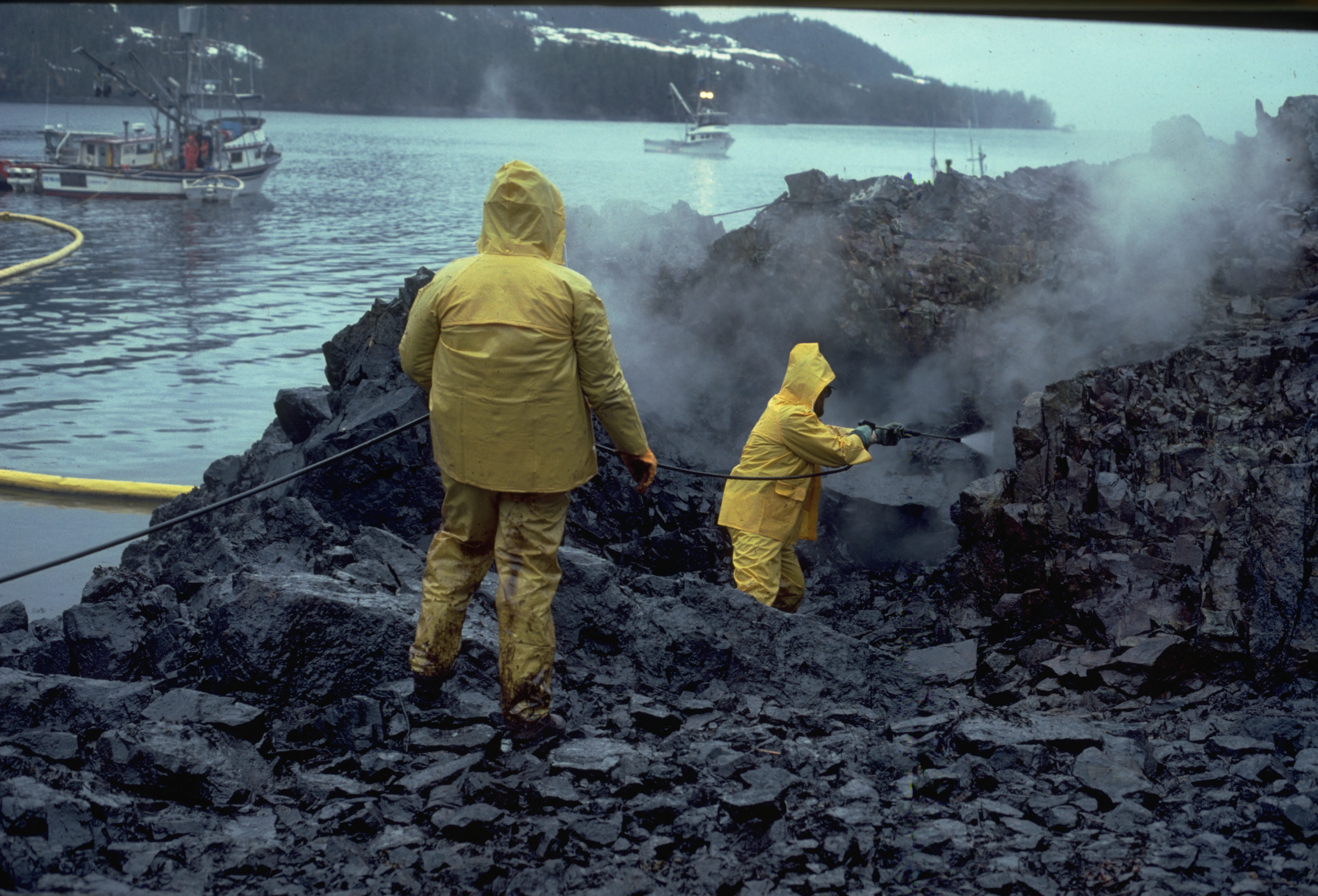
Workers using high-pressure, hot-water washing to clean an oiled shoreline

Chemical dispersant, a surfactant and solvent mixture, was applied to the slick by a private company on March 24 with a helicopter, but the helicopter missed the target area. Scientific data on its toxicity were either thin or incomplete. In addition, public acceptance of new, widespread chemical treatment was lacking. Landowners, fishing groups, and conservation organizations questioned the use of chemicals on hundreds of miles of shoreline when other alternatives might have been available.

According to a report by David Kirby for TakePart, the main component of the Corexit formulation used during cleanup, 2-butoxyethanol, was identified as "one of the agents that caused liver, kidney, lung, nervous system, and blood disorders among cleanup crews in Alaska following the 1989 Exxon Valdez spill". It is now known that while 2-butoxyethanol is indeed a respiratory irritant that can be acutely toxic, animal studies did not find it to be mutagenic, and no studies suggest it to be a human carcinogen.

Mechanical cleanup was started shortly afterward using booms and skimmers, but the skimmers were not readily available during the first 24 hours following the spill, and thick oil and kelp tended to clog the equipment. Despite civilian insistence for a complete cleanup, only 10% of total oil was actually completely cleaned. Exxon was widely criticized for its slow response to cleaning up the disaster and John Devens, the mayor of Valdez, said his community felt betrayed by Exxon's inadequate response to the crisis. More than 11,000 Alaska residents, along with some Exxon employees, worked throughout the region to try to restore the environment.

Though the clean-up effort was diligent, it failed to contain the majority of the oil that had spilled, and that has been blamed heavily upon Exxon. On November 26, 1984, Ronald A. Kreizenbeck (Director, Alaska Operations Office) informed the Coast Guard that the EPA suspected, due to a recent site-visitation during an 'Annual Marine Drill', that the Port of Valdez was not prepared to "efficiently respond to a major spill event". In the letter, he stated that "[it] appears that the Vikoma boom and/or deployment vessels used may not be adequate to handle the harsh environmental conditions of Port Valdez". Because Prince William Sound contained many rocky coves where the oil was collected, the decision was made to displace it with high-pressure hot water. However, this also displaced and destroyed the microbial populations on the shoreline; many of these organisms (e.g. plankton) are the basis of the coastal marine food chain, and others (e.g., certain bacteria and fungi) are capable of facilitating the biodegradation of oil. At the time, both scientific advice and public pressure was to clean everything, but since then, a much greater understanding of natural and facilitated remediation processes has developed, due somewhat in part to the opportunity presented for study by the Exxon Valdez spill.

Both long-term and short-term effects of the oil spill have been studied. Immediate effects include the deaths of between 100,000 and 250,000 seabirds, at least 2,800 sea otters, approximately 12 river otters, 300 harbor seals, 247 bald eagles, and 22 orcas, and an unknown number of salmon and herring.

Nine years after the disaster, evidence of negative oil spill effects on marine birds was found in the following species: cormorants, goldeneyes, mergansers, murres and pigeon guillemots.

Although the volume of oil has declined considerably, with oil remaining only about 0.14–0.28% of the original spilled volume, studies suggest that the area of oiled beach has changed little since 1992. A study by the National Marine Fisheries Service, NOAA in Juneau, determined that by 2001 approximately 90 tonnes of oil remained on beaches in Prince William Sound in the sandy soil of the contaminated shoreline, with annual loss rates declining from 68% per year prior to 1992, to 4% per year after 2001.

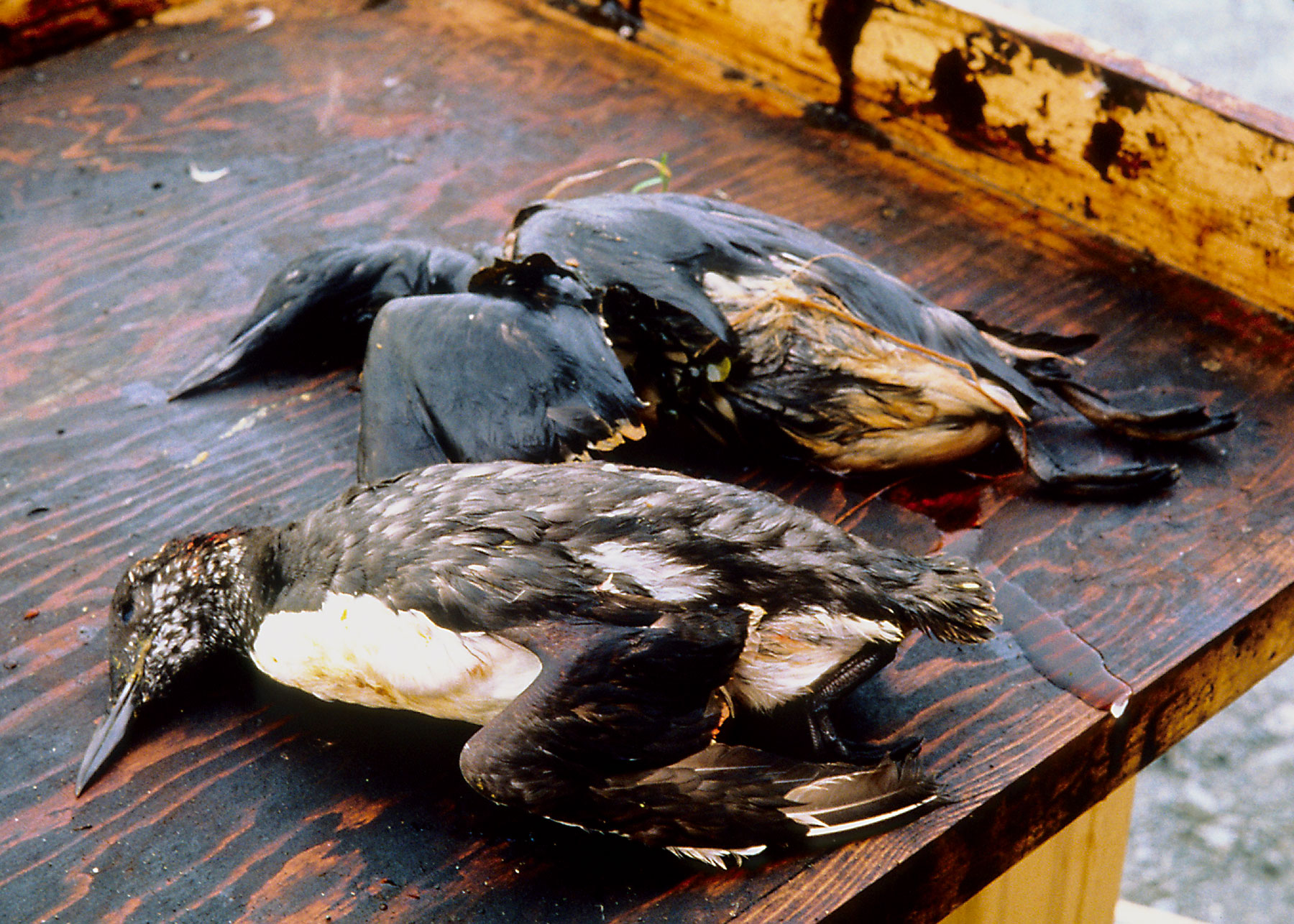
Wildlife was severely affected by the oil spill.

The remaining oil lasting far longer than anticipated has resulted in more long-term losses of species than had been expected. Laboratory experiments found that at levels as low as one part per billion, polycyclic aromatic hydrocarbons are toxic for salmon and herring eggs. Species as diverse as sea otters, harlequin ducks, and orcas suffered immediate and long-term losses. Oiled mussel beds and other tidal shoreline habitats may take up to 30 years to recover.

ExxonMobil denied concerns over the remaining oil, stating that they anticipated the remaining fraction would not cause long-term ecological impacts. According to the conclusions of ExxonMobil's study: "We've done 350 peer-reviewed studies of Prince William Sound, and those studies conclude that Prince William Sound has recovered, it's healthy and it's thriving."

On March 24, 2014, the twenty-fifth anniversary of the spill, NOAA scientists reported that some species seem to have recovered, with the sea otter the latest creature to return to pre-spill numbers. Scientists who have monitored the spill area for the last 25 years report that concern remains for one of two pods of local orca whales, with fears that one pod may eventually die out. Federal scientists estimate that between 16,000 and 21,000 US gallons (61 to 79 m^{3}) of oil remains on beaches in Prince William Sound and up to 450 miles (725 km) away. Some of the oil does not appear to have biodegraded at all. A USGS scientist who analyses the remaining oil along the coastline states that it remains among rocks and between tide marks. "The oil mixes with seawater and forms an emulsion...Left out, the surface crusts over but the inside still has the consistency of mayonnaise – or mousse." Alaska state senator Berta Gardner is urging Alaskan politicians to demand that the US government force ExxonMobil to pay the final $92 million (£57 million) still owed from the court settlement. The major part of the money would be spent to finish cleaning up oiled beaches and attempting to restore the crippled herring population.

As of 2012, the indirect and long-term sublethal effects of oil on shorebirds had been measured in relatively few studies.

== Litigation and cleanup costs ==
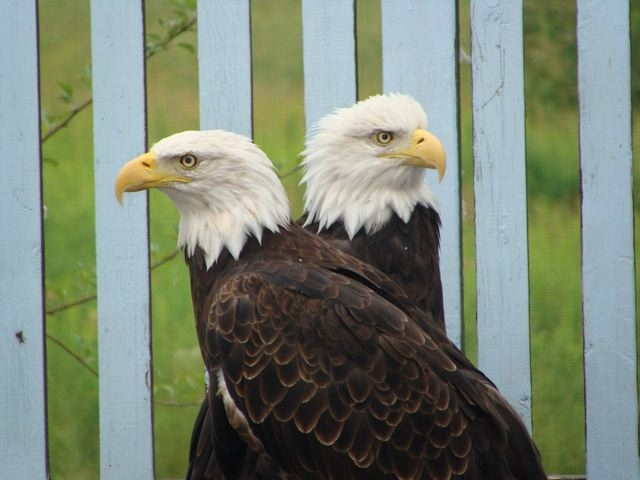
Bald eagles rescued from the oil spill

In October 1989, Exxon filed a suit against the State of Alaska, claiming that the state had interfered with Exxon's attempts to clean up the spill by refusing to approve the use of dispersant chemicals until the night of the 26th. The State of Alaska disputed this claim, stating that there was a long-standing agreement to allow the use of dispersants to clean up spills, thus Exxon did not require permission to use them, and that, in fact, Exxon had not had enough dispersant on hand to effectively handle a spill of the size created by Exxon Valdez.

Exxon filed claims in October 1990 against the Coast Guard, asking to be reimbursed for cleanup costs and damages awarded to plaintiffs in any lawsuits filed by the State of Alaska or the federal government against Exxon. The company claimed that the Coast Guard was "wholly or partially responsible" for the spill, because they had granted mariners' licenses to the crew of the Valdez, and because they had given Exxon Valdez permission to leave regular shipping lanes to avoid ice. They also reiterated the claim that the Coast Guard had delayed cleanup by refusing to give permission to immediately use chemical dispersants on the spill.

Also, in 1991, Exxon made a quiet, separate financial settlement of damages with a group of seafood producers known as the Seattle Seven for the disaster's effect on the Alaskan seafood industry. The agreement granted $63.75 million to the Seattle Seven, but stipulated that the seafood companies would have to repay almost all of any punitive damages awarded in other civil proceedings. The $5 billion in punitive damages was awarded later, and the Seattle Seven's share could have been as high as $750 million if the damages award had held. Other plaintiffs have objected to this secret arrangement, and when it came to light, Judge Holland ruled that Exxon should have told the jury at the start that an agreement had already been made, so the jury would know exactly how much Exxon would have to pay.

In the case of Exxon v. Baker, an Anchorage jury awarded $287 million for actual damages and $5 billion for punitive damages. To protect itself in case the judgment was affirmed, Exxon obtained a $4.8 billion credit line from J.P. Morgan & Co., who created the first modern credit default swap so that they would not have to hold as much money in reserve against the risk of Exxon's default.

Meanwhile, Exxon appealed the ruling, and the 9th U.S. Circuit Court of Appeals ordered the trial judge, Russel Holland, to reduce the punitive damages. On December 6, 2002, Holland announced that he had reduced the damages to $4 billion, which he concluded was justified by the facts of the case and was not grossly excessive. Exxon appealed again and the case returned to Holland to be reconsidered in light of a recent Supreme Court ruling in a similar case. Holland increased the punitive damages to $4.5 billion, plus interest.

After more appeals, in December 2006 the damages award was cut to $2.5 billion. The court of appeals cited recent Supreme Court rulings relative to limits on punitive damages.

Exxon appealed again. On May 23, 2007, the 9th Circuit Court of Appeals denied ExxonMobil's request for a third hearing and let stand its ruling that Exxon owed $2.5 billion in punitive damages. Exxon then appealed to the Supreme Court, which agreed to hear the case. On February 27, 2008, the Supreme Court heard oral arguments. Justice Samuel Alito, who at the time owned between $100,000 and $250,000 in Exxon stock, recused himself from the case. In a decision issued June 25, 2008, written by Justice David Souter, the court vacated the $2.5 billion award and remanded the case back to the lower court, finding that the damages were excessive with respect to maritime common law. Exxon's actions were deemed "worse than negligent but less than malicious." The punitive damages were further reduced to an amount of $507.5 million. The Court's ruling was that maritime punitive damages should not exceed the compensatory damages, supported by a precedent dating from 1818. Senate Judiciary Committee Chairman Patrick J. Leahy has decried the ruling as "another in a line of cases where this Supreme Court has misconstrued congressional intent to benefit large corporations."

Exxon's official position was that punitive damages greater than $25 million were not justified because the spill resulted from an accident, and because Exxon spent an estimated $2 billion cleaning up the spill and a further $1 billion to settle related civil and criminal charges. Attorneys for the plaintiffs contended that Exxon bore responsibility for the accident because the company "put a drunk in charge of a tanker in Prince William Sound." Exxon recovered a significant portion of clean-up and legal expenses through insurance claims associated with the grounding of Exxon Valdez.

As of December 15, 2009, Exxon had paid the entire $507.5 million in punitive damages, including lawsuit costs, plus interest, which were further distributed to thousands of plaintiffs. This amount was one-tenth of the original punitive damages, Exxon remained hugely profitable, the process of payment was drawn out over decades, and long term damage continues and is not funded by Exxon. Hence, the Exxon spill is often cited as shorthand for corporate responsibility for societal damage not being enforced adequately.

== Political consequences and reforms ==
=== Coast Guard report ===
A 1989 report by the Coast Guard's U.S. National Response Center summarized the event and made many recommendations, including that neither Exxon, Alyeska Pipeline Service Company, the State of Alaska, nor the federal government were prepared for a spill of this magnitude.

=== Oil Pollution Act of 1990 ===
In response to the spill, the United States Congress passed the Oil Pollution Act of 1990 (OPA). The legislation included a clause that prohibits any vessel that, after March 22, 1989, has caused an oil spill of more than 1 million US gallons (3,800 m^{3}) in any marine area, from operating in Prince William Sound.

In April 1998, the company argued in a legal action against the federal government that the ship should be allowed back into Alaskan waters. Exxon claimed OPA was effectively a bill of attainder, a regulation that was unfairly directed at Exxon alone. In 2002, the 9th Circuit Court of Appeals ruled against Exxon. As of 2002, OPA had prevented 18 ships from entering Prince William Sound.

OPA also set a schedule for the gradual phase-in of a double hull design, providing an additional layer between the oil tanks and the ocean. While a double hull would likely not have prevented the Exxon Valdez disaster, a Coast Guard study estimated that it would have cut the amount of oil spilled by 60 percent.

Exxon Valdez was towed to San Diego, arriving on July 10. Repairs began on July 30. Approximately 1,600 short tons (1,500 t) of steel were removed and replaced. In June 1990, the tanker, renamed Exxon Mediterranean, left the harbor after $30 million of repairs. In 1993, owned by SeaRiver Maritime, it was named S/R Mediterranean, then in 2005 Mediterranean. In 2008 the vessel was acquired by a Hong Kong company that had her converted from a tanker to an ore carrier and operated her as Dong Fang Ocean, then in 2011 renamed her Oriental Nicety. In August 2012, she was beached at Alang, and dismantled.

=== Alaska regulations ===
In the aftermath of the spill, Alaska governor Steve Cowper issued an executive order requiring two tugboats to escort every loaded tanker from Valdez out through Prince William Sound to Hinchinbrook Entrance. As the plan evolved in the 1990s, one of the two routine tugboats was replaced with a 210-foot (64 m) Escort Response Vehicle (ERV). Tankers at Valdez are no longer single-hulled. Congress enacted legislation requiring all tankers to be double-hulled as of 2015.

== Economic and Native impact ==
In 1991, following the collapse of populations of local marine species (particularly clams, herring, and seals), the Chugach Alaska Corporation, an Alaska Native Corporation, filed for Chapter 11 bankruptcy protection. It has since recovered.

According to several studies funded by the state of Alaska, the spill had both short-term and long-term economic effects. These included the loss of recreational sports, fisheries, reduced tourism, and an estimate of what economists call "existence value", which is the value to the public of a pristine Prince William Sound.

The economy of the city of Cordova, Alaska, was adversely affected after the spill damaged stocks of salmon and herring in the area. The village of Chenega was transformed into an emergency base and media outlet. The local villagers had to cope with a tripling of their population from 80 to 250. When asked how they felt about the situation, a village councilor noted that they were too shocked and busy to be depressed; others emphasized the human costs of leaving children unattended while their parents worked to clean up. Many Alaska Natives were worried that too much time was spent on the fishery and not enough on the land that supports subsistence hunting.

In 2010, CNN reported on studies concluding that many oil spill cleanup workers involved in the Exxon Valdez response had subsequently become sick, and warned those exposed to the Deepwater Horizon oil spill to take heed. Anchorage lawyer Dennis Mestas found that this was true for 6,722 of 11,000 worker files he was able to inspect, despite access to the records being controlled by Exxon. Exxon denied this in a statement to CNN:

After 20 years, there is no evidence suggesting that either cleanup workers or the residents of the communities affected by the Valdez spill have had any adverse health effects as a result of the spill or its cleanup.

Environmental activists and State officials became concerned that BP would use similar techniques to minimize liability and de-emphasize health impacts:

the symptoms being reported in the Gulf states are the same ones that hit workers in Alaska. And just like then, people with their backs against the wall financially are flocking to the take jobs with the cleanup... I'm feeling like BP is forcing them into this situation where BP holds all the cards, and BP is letting these workers get sick

== Reactions ==
In 1992, Exxon released a video titled Scientists and the Alaska Oil Spill for distribution to schools. Critics said the video misrepresented the clean-up process.

In December 1994, the Unabomber assassinated Burson-Marsteller executive Thomas J. Mosser, accusing him of having "helped Exxon clean up its public image after the Exxon Valdez incident".

=== In popular culture ===
Several weeks after the spill, Saturday Night Live aired a pointed sketch featuring Kevin Nealon, Phil Hartman, and Victoria Jackson as cleanup workers struggling to scrub the oil off of animals and rocks on a beach in Prince William Sound.

In the second Forrest Gump novel, Gump and Co. by Winston Groom, Gump commandeers Exxon Valdez and accidentally crashes it.

Composer Jonathan Larson wrote a song called "Iron Mike" about the oil spill. The song is written in the style of a sea shanty. It was first professionally recorded by George Salazar for the album The Jonathan Larson Project.

== See also ==
- List of oil spills
- Ixtoc I oil spill
- Dead Ahead: The Exxon Valdez Disaster, 1992 HBO movie
- Martin County coal slurry spill
- Kingston Fossil Plant coal fly ash slurry spill
