= Theodorus Bailey (officer) =

United States Navy admiral

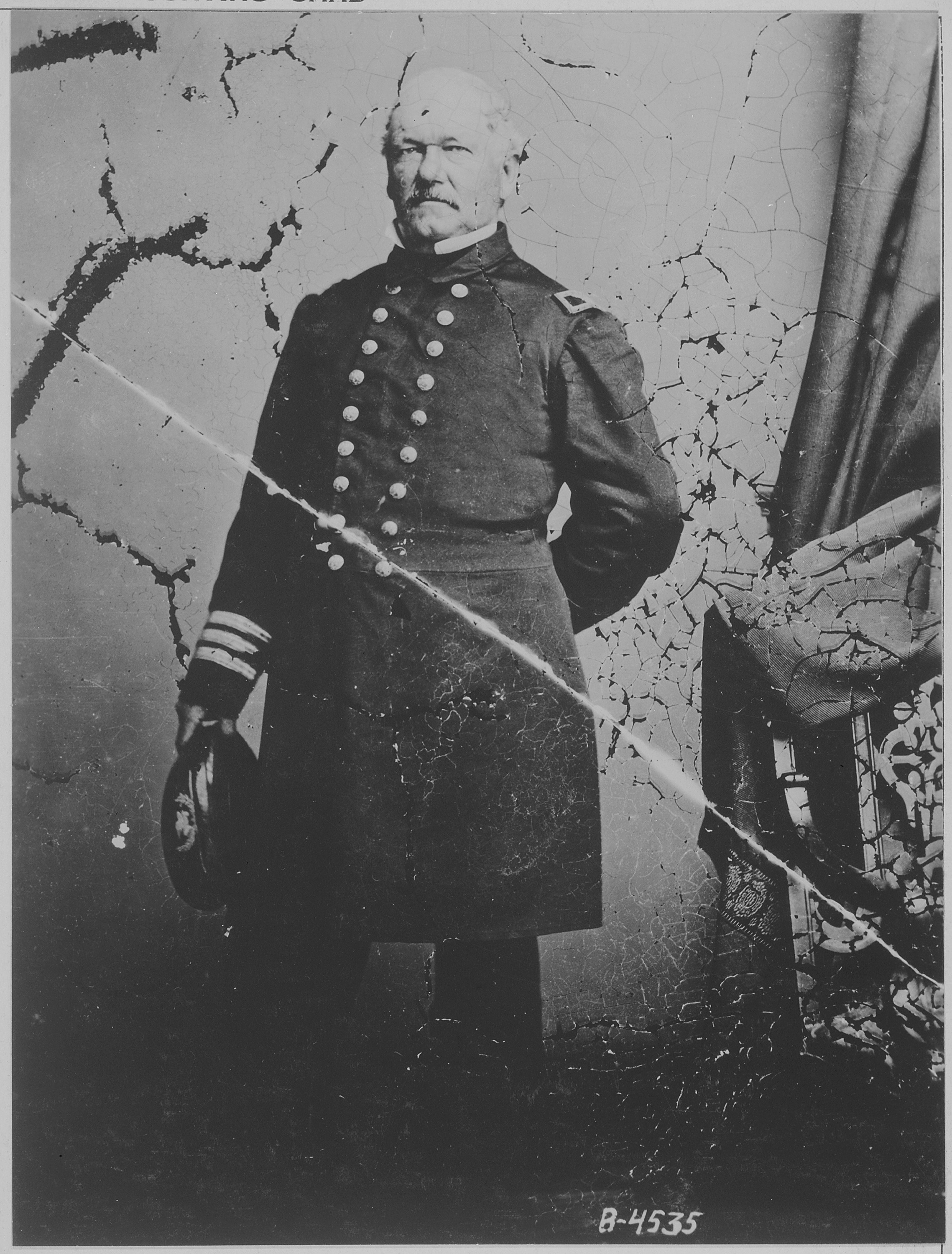
- Commodore Theodorus Bailey
- Born: April 12, 1805; Chateaugay, New York, U.S.
- Died: February 10, 1877 (aged 71); Washington, D.C., U.S.
- Burial place: Oak Hill Cemetery; Washington, D.C., U.S.
- Relatives: Theodorus Bailey, Senator from New York (uncle)
- Military career
- Allegiance: United States
- Branch: United States Navy
- Service years: 1818–1867
- Rank: Rear admiral
- Commands: USS Lexington; USS St. Mary's; USS Colorado; East Gulf Blockading Squadron; Commandant, Portsmouth Navy Yard
- Conflicts: Mexican–American War; American Civil War; Battle of Forts Jackson and St. Philip

Theodorus Bailey (April 12, 1805 – February 10, 1877) was a United States Navy officer during the American Civil War.

== Early career ==
Bailey was born at Chateaugay, New York in the far north-eastern corner of Franklin County, near the border with Quebec. He received his early education at Plattsburgh, before being appointed a midshipman at the beginning of 1818 at age 12. He saw his first sea duty in the frigate Cyane between 1819 and 1821 when she cruised to the western coast of Africa to protect the new colony of former slaves recently established by the United States. On the return voyage, he saw service in the campaign to suppress the West Indian pirates. In 1821, Bailey transferred to the ship of the line Franklin and served in her during her entire cruise as flagship for the Pacific station, which lasted until 1824. His last tour of duty as a midshipman came between 1824 and 1826 when he voyaged back to the West Indies in the schooner Shark to protect shipping from pirates again.

In 1827, he moved to duty in the receiving ship at New York. It was while in this assignment that he received his commission as a lieutenant on March 3, 1827, after almost a decade of service. Next, he served briefly in the sloop Natchez and in the schooner Grampus in 1831, before being assigned to Vincennes in June 1833 for a three-year cruise around the world in search of shipwrecked and stranded American seamen. Returning to the east coast in June 1836, Bailey saw duty in the ship-of-the-line Ohio before going ashore for a two-year tour at the New York Navy Yard from 1838 to 1840. Bailey returned to sea in the frigate Constellation between 1840 and 1844. During that period, his ship served an extended tour on the East India station and carried Bailey on his second circumnavigation of the world. After returning from the East Indies, he went ashore again and spent time in 1845 and 1846 engaged in recruiting duty at the Rendezvous in New York.

== Mexican–American War ==
After the Mexican War broke out in the spring of 1846, Bailey assumed his first command, the sloop Lexington, that summer. He embarked an artillery company at New York and set sail for the Pacific coast. Sailing by way of Cape Horn and La Paz, Chile, his ship arrived on the California coast late in the year. During the closing phase of the war Bailey led his command in a blockade of the coast around San Blas in Lower California and even made a successful raid on the town in January 1847, capturing several pieces of ordnance in the process.

In October 1848, Bailey left Lexington on the west coast to go ashore on a leave of absence from the service. He remained ashore waiting orders for almost five years, during which time on March 6, 1849, he received his promotion to commander. Finally, in 1853, he received orders to command the sloop of war St. Mary's then under repair at Philadelphia. In her, Bailey cruised to the eastern and southern Pacific during 1854, 1855, and 1856, receiving his promotion to captain on December 15, 1855. Relieved at Panama on December 16, 1856, Bailey spent the four years immediately preceding the Civil War ashore, first on some unspecified special duty and then awaiting orders.

== American Civil War ==
The outbreak of the American Civil War brought Bailey the orders he sought. On June 3, 1861, he put the steam frigate Colorado back in commission at Boston and set sail a fortnight later to join the Gulf Blockading Squadron. Colorado arrived at Key West on July 9 and at Fort Pickens on Santa Rosa Island off Pensacola on the 15th. There, Colorado became flagship of the Gulf Blockading Squadron on 16 July when Flag Officer William Mervine embarked.

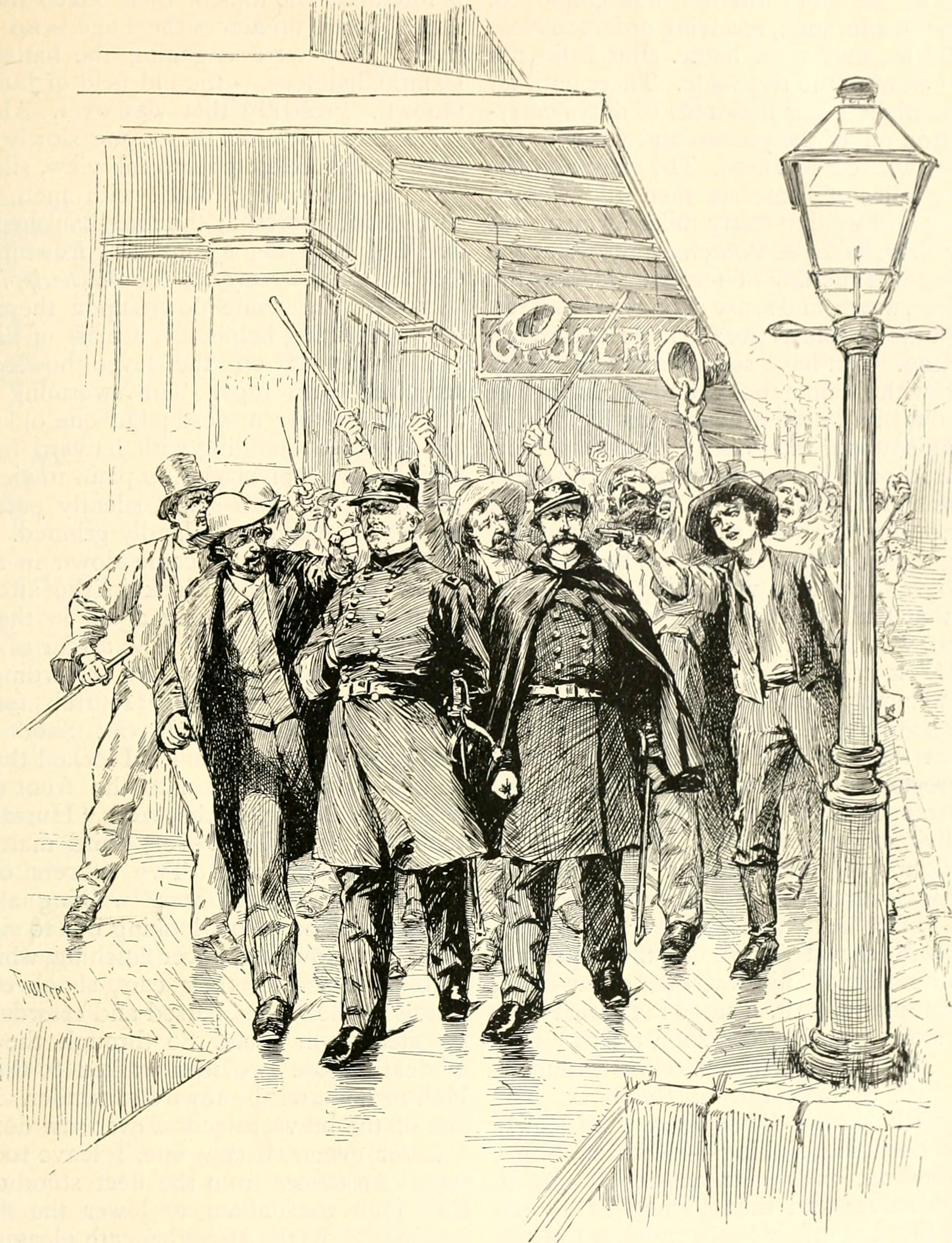
Bailey with Lieutenant Perkins in New Orleans

Bailey patrolled the waters off the Florida Panhandle until mid-November at which time his ship moved to a blockade station off the Mississippi Delta. Though Bailey technically retained command of Colorado until the beginning of May 1862, he was performing other duties in conjunction with the assault on the defenses of New Orleans by April 1862. When the push to take the city went off on April 24, Bailey commanded one of the gunboat divisions during the fight to pass Forts Jackson and St. Philip. Once that feat had been accomplished, he continued on upriver to demand the city's surrender on the 25th. Bailey and Lieutenant George H. Perkins walked to city hall despite armed civilians crowding around them, shouting threats. Mayor John Monroe refused to surrender the city, but as Confederate troops had already evacuated, the Union soon occupied New Orleans.

Bailey relinquished command of Colorado officially on May 1, 1862, and returned north with dispatches. Promoted to commodore on July 16, 1862, Bailey commanded the station at Sackett's Harbor, New York, through the summer of 1862. Heading south again in November 1862, Bailey relieved Acting Rear Admiral James L. Lardner as flag officer commanding the East Gulf Blockading Squadron. He held that post until the summer of 1864 when, after a bout of yellow fever, he was transferred to duty as the commandant at the Portsmouth Navy Yard. About halfway through that assignment, he received his promotion to rear admiral on July 25, 1866. Though placed on the retired list on October 10, 1866, Rear Admiral Bailey served as the commandant at Portsmouth until the latter part of 1867.

Admiral Bailey was a member of the New York Commandery of the Military Order of the Loyal Legion of the United States.

Rear Admiral Bailey died at Washington, D. C., on February 10, 1877. He was buried at Oak Hill Cemetery in Washington, D.C.

== Other work ==
Bailey was instrumental in developing a primitive "thruster system," the principles of which are still in use today. A pipe could direct water to one side of the ship or another, which caused the ship to be able to move with more agility in the high seas. Today, ships use this principle in thruster systems.

== Namesakes ==
Three ships have been named USS Bailey for him.
