= USTS Bay State =

TS or USTS Bay State may refer to one of these training ships of the Massachusetts Maritime Academy:

- USTS Bay State (I), served the Massachusetts Maritime Academy c. 1940–1941; the former United States Navy gunboat USS Nantucket launched in 1876
- USTS Bay State (II), served the Massachusetts Maritime Academy from 1957–1973; the former U.S. Navy attack transport USS Doyen (APA-1) launched in 1942; sold in 1974
- USTS Bay State (III), served the Massachusetts Maritime Academy from 1974–1978; the former United States Army and U.S. Navy transport ship Henry Gibbins launched in 1942; scrapped in 1983
- USTS Bay State (IV), served the Massachusetts Maritime Academy from 1980–1981; the former U.S. Navy transport ship Geiger (T-AP-197) launched in 1950; burned near Cape Cod in December 1981
