= List of ship launches in 1950 =

The list of ship launches in 1950 includes a chronological list of all ships launched in 1950.

Date	Ship	Class / type	Builder	Location	Country	Notes
16 January	John N. Cobb	Research vessel	Western Boatbuilding Company	Tacoma, Washington	United States	For National Oceanic and Atmospheric Administration
19 January	Retainer	Armament support ship			United Kingdom	For Royal Fleet Auxiliary
29 January	BO-277	Kronshtadt-class submarine chaser	Zelenodolsk Gorky Plant	Zelenedolsk	Soviet Union	
January	Blakeley	Car float	Alabama Drydock and Shipbuilding Company	Mobile, Alabama	United States	For Alabama, Tennessee and Northern Railroad.
2 February	British Consul	Tanker	Harland & Wolff	Belfast	United Kingdom	For British Tanker Company.
6 February	Carnarvon	Whaler	Harland & Wolff	Belfast	United Kingdom	For Australian Whaling Commission.
9 February	BO-278	Kronshtadt-class submarine chaser	Zelenodolsk Gorky Plant	Zelenedolsk	Soviet Union	
17 February	Andalusian	Cargo Ship	William Gray & Company	West Hartlepool	United Kingdom	For Ellerman & Papayani Line
7 March	Suevic	Refrigerated cargo ship	Harland & Wolff	Belfast	United Kingdom	For Shaw Savill Line.
21 March	BO-282	Kronshtadt-class submarine chaser	Zelenodolsk Gorky Plant	Zelenedolsk	Soviet Union	
21 March	British Explorer	Tanker	Harland & Wolff	Belfast	United Kingdom	For British Tanker Company.
31 March	BO-283	Kronshtadt-class submarine chaser	Zelenodolsk Gorky Plant	Zelenedolsk	Soviet Union	
4 April	Juan Perón	Factory ship	Harland & Wolff	Belfast	United Kingdom	For Compania Argentina de Pesca.
15 April	BO-284	Kronshtadt-class submarine chaser	Zelenodolsk Gorky Plant	Zelenedolsk	Soviet Union	
3 May	Ark Royal	Audacious-class aircraft carrier	Cammell Laird	Birkenhead	United Kingdom	For Royal Navy
18 May	Giulio Cesare	Ocean liner	Cantieri Riuniti dell'Adriatico	Trieste	Italy	For Italian Line
31 May	BO-285	Kronshtadt-class submarine chaser	Zelenodolsk Gorky Plant	Zelenedolsk	Soviet Union	
1 June	British Prospector	Tanker	Harland & Wolff	Belfast	United Kingdom	For British Tanker Company.
3 June	Independence	Ocean liner	Bethlehem Steel Corporation	Quincy, Massachusetts	United States	For American Export Lines
3 June	BO-286	Kronshtadt-class submarine chaser	Zelenodolsk Gorky Plant	Zelenedolsk	Soviet Union	
6 June	BO-287	Kronshtadt-class submarine chaser	Zelenodolsk Gorky Plant	Zelenedolsk	Soviet Union	
14 June	Bratsberg	Tanker	Harland & Wolff	Belfast	United Kingdom	For Borgestad A/S.
14 June	Diamond	Daring-class destroyer	John Brown & Company	Clydebank, Scotland	United Kingdom	For Royal Navy
15 June	Ascanius	Cargo ship	Harland & Wolff	Belfast	United Kingdom	For Blue Funnel Line.
19 June	BO-289	Kronshtadt-class submarine chaser	Zelenodolsk Gorky Plant	Zelenedolsk	Soviet Union	
27 June	President Jackson		New York Shipbuilding Corporation	Camden, New Jersey	United States	
29 June	Verena	Tanker	Harland & Wolff	Belfast	United Kingdom	For Anglo-Saxon Petroleum Company.
June	Daressa	Cargo liner	Barclay, Curle & Co. Ltd.	Glasgow	United Kingdom	For British India Steam Navigation Company.
June	SK-146	Deck barge	Alabama Drydock and Shipbuilding Company	Mobile, Alabama	United States	For Southern Kraft Corporation.
June	SK-147	Deck barge	Alabama Drydock and Shipbuilding Company	Mobile, Alabama	United States	For Southern Kraft Corporation.
June	SK-148	Deck barge	Alabama Drydock and Shipbuilding Company	Mobile, Alabama	United States	For Southern Kraft Corporation.
June	2 unnamed vessels	Tank barge	Alabama Drydock and Shipbuilding Company	Mobile, Alabama	United States	For United States Army Corps of Engineers.
June	Unnamed	Hopper barge	Alabama Drydock and Shipbuilding Company	Mobile, Alabama	United States	For United States Army Corps of Engineers.
27 July	Defender	Daring-class destroyer	Alexander Stephen and Sons	Glasgow, Scotland	United Kingdom	For Royal Navy
27 July	Ocean Monarch	Cruise ship	Vickers-Armstrongs	Walker	United Kingdom	For Furness Withy
28 July	Ixion	Cargo ship	Harland & Wolff	Belfast	United Kingdom	For Blue Funnel Line.
28 July	Jaroslaw Dabrowski	Cargo ship	Blyth Dry Docks & Shipbuilding Co. Ltd	Blyth, Northumberland	United Kingdom	For Polish Ocean Lines.
July	Barge No. 15	Tank barge	Alabama Drydock and Shipbuilding Company	Mobile, Alabama	United States	For Belcher Towing Co.
July	4 unnamed vessels	Hopper barges	Alabama Drydock and Shipbuilding Company	Mobile, Alabama	United States	For United States Army Corps of Engineers.
10 August	BO-291	Kronshtadt-class submarine chaser	Zelenodolsk Gorky Plant	Zelenedolsk	Soviet Union	
13 August	BO-292	Kronshtadt-class submarine chaser	Zelenodolsk Gorky Plant	Zelenedolsk	Soviet Union	
13 August	BO-293	Kronshtadt-class submarine chaser	Zelenodolsk Gorky Plant	Zelenedolsk	Soviet Union	
15 August	British Surveyor	Tanker	Harland & Wolff	Belfast	United Kingdom	For British Tanker Company.
15 August	Provence	Passenger ship	Swan Hunter	Wallsend	United Kingdom	For Société Générale des Transports Maritime
16 August	Dainty	Daring-class destroyer	J. Samuel White	Cowes, Isle of Wight	United Kingdom	
20 August	BO-294	Kronshtadt-class submarine chaser	Zelenodolsk Gorky Plant	Zelenedolsk	Soviet Union	
28 August	BO-295	Kronshtadt-class submarine chaser	Zelenodolsk Gorky Plant	Zelenedolsk	Soviet Union	
29 August	Rosa Maersk	Tanker	Blyth Dry Docks & Shipbuilding Co. Ltd	Blyth, Northumberland	United Kingdom	For A/S D/S Svendborg and D/S af 1912 A/S.
1 September	BO-296	Kronshtadt-class submarine chaser	Zelenodolsk Gorky Plant	Zelenedolsk	Soviet Union	
9 September	BO-297	Kronshtadt-class submarine chaser	Zelenodolsk Gorky Plant	Zelenedolsk	Soviet Union	
15 September	BO-298	Kronshtadt-class submarine chaser	Zelenodolsk Gorky Plant	Zelenedolsk	Soviet Union	
26 September	Laganfield	Tanker	Harland & Wolff	Belfast	United Kingdom	For Hunting & Sons.
28 September	Binta	Tanker	Harland & Wolff	Belfast	United Kingdom	For Per Gjerding.
28 September	Bolette	Tanker	Harland & Wolff	Belfast	United Kingdom	For Fred. Olsen & Co.
28 September	Kvint	Whaler	Harland & Wolff	Belfast	United Kingdom	For Falkland Shipowners Co.
30 September	BO-299	Kronshtadt-class submarine chaser	Zelenodolsk Gorky Plant	Zelenedolsk	Soviet Union	
9 October	President Adams		New York Shipbuilding Corporation	Camden, New Jersey	United States	
7 October	BO-300	Kronshtadt-class submarine chaser	Zelenodolsk Gorky Plant	Zelenedolsk	Soviet Union	
15 October	BO-334	Kronshtadt-class submarine chaser	Zelenodolsk Gorky Plant	Zelenedolsk	Soviet Union	
21 October	S-80	Whiskey-class submarine		Krasnoye Sormovo	Soviet Union	For Soviet Navy
19 November	Augustus	Ocean liner	Cantieri Riuniti dell'Adriatico	Trieste	Italy	For Italian Line
24 November	Dronning Ingrid	Ferry	Helsingør Jernskibs og Maskinbyggeri	Helsingør	Denmark	For Danske Statsbaner
12 December	Ringerd	Tanker	Harland & Wolff	Belfast	United Kingdom	For Olav Ringdal.
20 December	Winsor Trader	Cargo ship	Burntisland Shipbuilding Company	Burntisland	United Kingdom	For Dundee, Perth & London Shipping Co Ltd
21 December	Delight	Daring-class destroyer	Fairfield Shipbuilding and Engineering	Glasgow, Scotland	United Kingdom	For Royal Navy
28 December	BO-336	Kronshtadt-class submarine chaser	Zelenodolsk Gorky Plant	Zelenedolsk	Soviet Union	
31 December	BO-337	Kronshtadt-class submarine chaser	Zelenodolsk Gorky Plant	Zelenedolsk	Soviet Union	
Unknown date	BO-279	Kronshtadt-class submarine chaser	Zelenodolsk Gorky Plant	Zelenedolsk	Soviet Union	
Unknown date	BO-280	Kronshtadt-class submarine chaser	Zelenodolsk Gorky Plant	Zelenedolsk	Soviet Union	
Unknown date	BO-281	Kronshtadt-class submarine chaser	Zelenodolsk Gorky Plant	Zelenedolsk	Soviet Union	
Unknown date	BO-288	Kronshtadt-class submarine chaser	Zelenodolsk Gorky Plant	Zelenedolsk	Soviet Union	
Unknown date	BO-290	Kronshtadt-class submarine chaser	Zelenodolsk Gorky Plant	Zelenedolsk	Soviet Union	
Unknown date	BO-335	Kronshtadt-class submarine chaser	Zelenodolsk Gorky Plant	Zelenedolsk	Soviet Union	
Unknown date	BO-336	Kronshtadt-class submarine chaser	Zelenodolsk Gorky Plant	Zelenedolsk	Soviet Union	
Unknown date	Changchow	Passenger ship	Scotts Shipbuilding and Engineering Co. Ltd.	Greenock	United Kingdom	For China Navigation Co. Ltd.
Unknown date	Chungking	Passenger ship	Scotts Shipbuilding and Engineering Co. Ltd.	Greenock	United Kingdom	For China Navigation Co. Ltd.
Unknown date	Covert	Motor barge	J. Bolson & Son Ltd.	Poole	United Kingdom	For Hayes Wharfe.
Unknown date	Crop	Motor barge	J. Bolson & Son Ltd.	Poole	United Kingdom	For British Transport Commission.
Unknown date	Missellele	Tug	Aldous Successors Ltd.	Brightlingsea	United Kingdom	For Cameroons Development Agency.
Unknown date	Mokundange	Launch	Aldous Successors Ltd.	Brightlingsea	United Kingdom	For Elders & Fyffes.
Unknown date	Welding Barge	Barge	Blyth Dry Docks & Shipbuilding Co. Ltd	Blyth, Northumberland	United Kingdom	For private owner.
Unknown date	Wendy Ann	Tug	J. Bolson & Son Ltd.	Poole	United Kingdom	For Harry Rose (Towage) Ltd.
