= National Security Multi-Mission Vessel =

U.S. Maritime Administration training ship

- Proposed design for the National Security Multi-Mission Vessel from 2017 promotional images.

Class overview
- Name: National Security Multi-Mission Vessel
- Builders: Philly Shipyard
- Operators: U.S. Maritime Administration and the Maritime Academies
- Built: 2021-present
- In service: 2023
- Planned: 5
- Building: 1
- Completed: 4

General characteristics
- Type: Training Ship/Troopship
- Length: 525 ft 1 in (160.05 m)
- Beam: 88 ft 7 in (27.0 m)
- Draft: 21 ft 4 in (6.5 m)
- Installed power: 16,800 kW (22,500 hp), plus 900 kW (1,200 hp) emergency generator
- Propulsion: 4 x Wabtec 16V250MDC engines, single all electric drive shaft
- Speed: 18 knots (33 km/h; 21 mph) (top); 12 knots (22 km/h; 14 mph) (cruising)
- Range: 11,000 nmi (20,000 km; 13,000 mi) at 18 knots
- Complement: 100 officers, faculty, staff and crew, 600 cadets

The National Security Multi-Mission Vessel (NSMV) is a United States Maritime Administration (MARAD) ship designed as training vessels for the U.S. state maritime academies. The five vessels will also be equipped to provide humanitarian assistance and disaster relief. The US$1,670.6 million project was managed by TOTE Maritime, a U.S.-based shipping company with experience building U.S.-flagged vessels, with the Philly Shipyard constructing the ships. The first ship was delivered to State University of New York Maritime College in September 2023.

== Purpose ==
“Established primarily to address an aging training fleet, the new purpose-built NSMV enhances the Nation's maritime academies' training capabilities and serves as critical support assets for the federal government in times of need."

== Background ==
The six US state maritime academies (Cal Poly Maritime Academy in Vallejo, CA; Great Lakes Maritime Academy in Traverse City, MI; Maine Maritime Academy in Castine, ME; Massachusetts Maritime Academy in Buzzard’s Bay, MA; State University of New York Maritime College in the Bronx, NY; and Texas A&M Maritime Academy in Galveston, TX) produce more than 70% of the licensed mariners who serve as officers and engineers for the US merchant fleet. U.S. Federal Regulations require the merchant marine training curriculum at the state maritime academies to include “at least six (6) months of the total time must be aboard a Training Ship in cruise status", and authorize the U.S. Department of Transportation to provide the state maritime academies a “suitable ship", and if no such vessel is available, to build and provide such a vessel. Much of the year these vessels are moored alongside each school’s pier, serving as live classrooms and laboratories for students. When not engaged in a cruise status, these vessels are also available to be deployed in support of Federal missions, such as disaster relief. The TS Empire State VI was activated in 1994 to support the withdrawal of troops from Somalia, and to support hurricane relief efforts in 2005 (Katrina), 2012 (Sandy), and 2017 (Maria). Similarly, the TS State of Maine was also deployed in support of hurricane relief efforts in 2005 (Katrina), as well as the TS Kennedy in 2012 (Sandy) and 2017 (Maria).

As of 2018 the current vessels were aging. The newest was almost 30 years old and oldest, Empire State VI, was 56 years old and had an antiquated steam power plant. The ships also fail international emission standards and this has impacted their training itineraries. MARAD provides the training ships and in 2015 initiated a program to develop a purpose-built ship design that would combine the training and disaster relief missions. This dual purpose led to the class name of the design as National Security Multi-Mission Vessel.

In 2015, the Volpe National Transportation Systems Center, explored four recapitalization scenarios:

1. new construction of multi-mission vessels using a new MARAD design for a national security / multi-mission vessel;
2. new construction of training ships, using a modified design of a suitable existing ship;
3. converting existing vessels into training ships; and,
4. service life extensions for two of the existing vessels.

Based on the analysis, Scenario 1 (Five New NSMVs) resulted in the lowest total estimated lifecycle cost. Each of the other scenarios analyzed fell short, with either a higher total estimated lifecycle cost, or lower capability to meet mission requirements.

== Design considerations ==
The “Description and Design Requirements for the PD 370; New Construction State Maritime Academy Training Ships” was published by the U.S. Maritime Administration in 2008, as mandated by the Consolidated Appropriations Act of 2008 (Public Law 110-161), and provided the first comprehensive conceptual and technical blueprint for a new class of "multi-mission" training vessels designed to replace the aging fleet of training vessels at the State Maritime Academies. In 2015 the Herbert Engineering Corp. of Alameda, CA began work on a preliminary design for what became the NSMV. The ship dimensions would have to fit the existing mooring berths at the service academies. The design team visited three of the academies to learn of their training requirements. While primarily a training ship, the vessels would also be equipped for disaster relief. These included a Roll-on/Roll-off side ramp, container space and crane, and a helipad.

== Funding ==
Beginning in 2013, the state maritime academies, acting as a consortium, began a multi-faceted effort to garner US Congressional and industry support for the NSMV program. These efforts included semi-annual meetings with relevant House and Senate Authorization and Appropriations committees, U.S. Maritime Administration leadership, and industry leaders; Congressional testimonies ; and public awareness articles in industry publications. The NSMV Program was formally authorized in November 2015 when the National Defense Authorization Act for Fiscal Year 2016 was signed into law. Funds for the NSMV Program were first appropriated in December 2015 when the Consolidated Appropriations Act for fiscal year 2016 (i.e., “Omnibus Bill”) was signed into law, and included $5 million for design of the NSMV.

Funding for construction of the first NSMV was made possible with the Bipartisan Budget Act of 2018, increasing both defense and non-defense spending for fiscal years 2018 and 2019 above the spending caps imposed by the Budget Control Act of 2011. In response, the U.S. Office of Management and Budget OMB issued the FY 2019 “Budget Addendum.” The only request from Department of Transportation in the Budget Addendum was to: “provide an additional $300 million to the Maritime Administration's Operations and Training account for the School Ship Replacement Program. The additional funds would support the one-time procurement and retrofitting of two used cargo ships to replace aging training ships provided to the State Maritime Academies. Specifically, this funding would be used to replace the TS Empire State, currently assigned to the State University of New York Maritime College, and TS Kennedy, currently assigned to the Massachusetts Maritime Academy.” In response to this request, the House and Senate Appropriations Committees reprogrammed the requested $300 million for construction of the first NSMV, and the Consolidated Appropriations Act, 2018 (i.e., “Omnibus Bill”) signed into law on March 23, 2018 included $300 million for construction of the first NSMV . Funding for the remaining four NSMV’s followed over the next several years:

NSMV being constructed at Philly Shipyard

Year	Amount	
2018	US$300 million	NSMV 1
2019	US$300 million	NSMV 2
2020	US$300 million	NSMV 3
2021	US$390 million	NSMV 3 & 4
2022	US$380.6 million	NSMV 5

== Project status ==
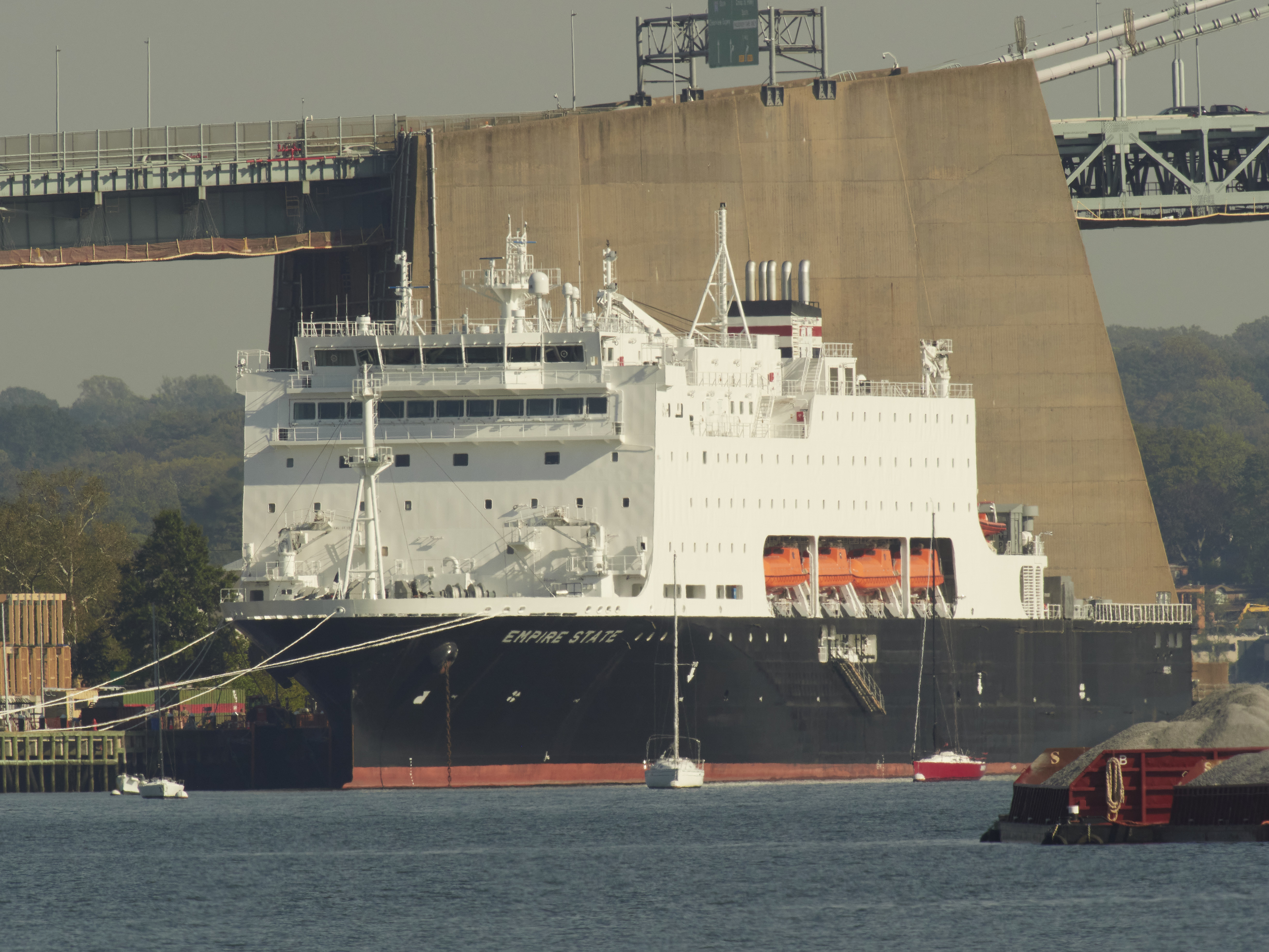
TS Empire State docked at SUNY Maritime College in October 2023 - NSMV 1

TS Patriot State underway - NSMV 2

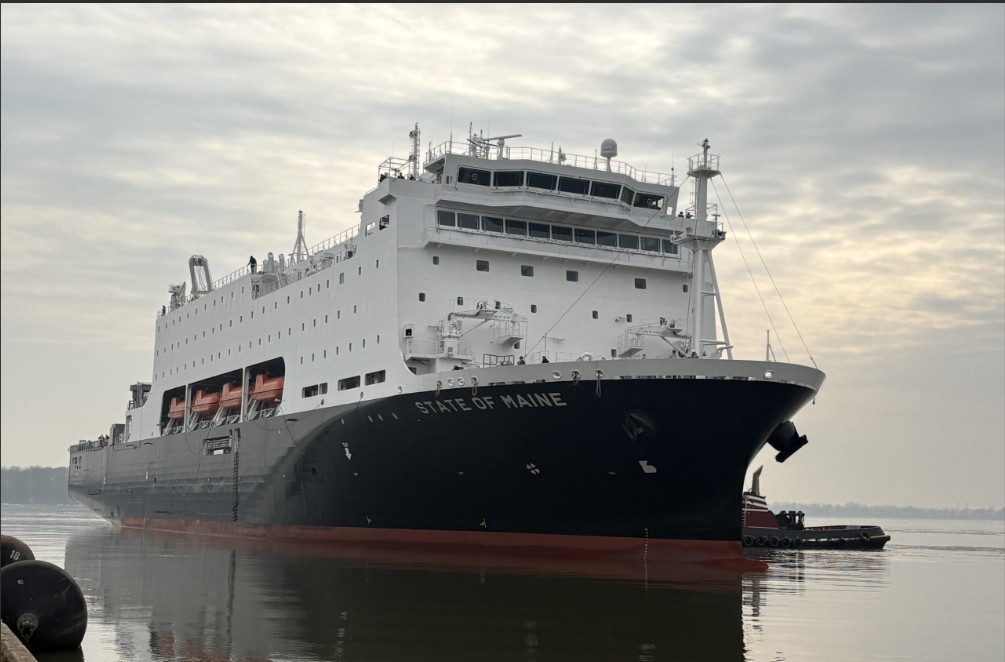
TS State of Maine arriving at Portland, Maine in March 2026 - NSMV 3

TS Lone Star State, the training ship of Texas A&M Maritime Academy docked at Galveston - NSMV 4

TS Golden State being constructed in Philly Shipyard - NSMV 5

In February 2018 the design stage was in Phase 3 of development and in sufficient detail to present to shipyards for construction bidding.

IN May 2019, MARAD awarded TOTE Services the NSMV Vessel Construction Manager (VCM) contract to oversee and manage the NSMV detailed design, construction, testing, and delivery. TOTE Services will also be responsible for selecting the shipyard for construction.

In April 2020, TOTE Services signed a contract with Philly Shipyard (Philadelphia, Pennsylvania) for the construction of the first two vessels to be delivered in the Spring and Winter 2023 for a cost of US$630M. TOTE Services is working with its design partners – Glosten, Inc., Philly Shipyard, and Philly Shipyard's subcontractors, including the design team at DSEC. In January 2021, MARAD authorized the construction of NSMV3 and NSMV4. In April 2022, MARAD authorized the construction of NSVM5.

Steel cutting for NSMV I began in December 2020, for NSMV2 in March 2021, and for NSMV3 in July 2022. In January 2020 a contract was signed with the same shipyard for NSMV4 with an anticipated delivery in 2024.

The vessels are anticipated to be delivered to the following maritime academies:

	Name	Operator	Keel Laid	Delivery
NSMV 1	Empire State VII	State University of New York Maritime College	10 December 2021	September 18, 2023
NSMV II	Patriot State II	Massachusetts Maritime Academy	29 September 2022	October 10, 2024
NSMV III	State of Maine V	Maine Maritime Academy	1 May 2023	30 March 2026
NSMV IV	Lone Star State	Texas A&M University at Galveston	6 December 2023	September 7, 2026
NSMV V	Golden State II	California State University Maritime Academy	9 February 2024	delivery expected 2026

== Infrastructure improvements ==
A heavy weather analysis was conducted of the pier infrastructure at each state maritime academy scheduled to receive an NSMV. This analysis was conducted to determine what infrastructure improvements were needed to withstand a Category 1 Hurricane. In addition to infrastructure improvements to meet the requirements of this heavy weather analysis, significant upgrades to the utilities servicing each pier were required to accommodate the increased electrical load of the NSMV. Several state maritime academy piers required replacements or extensions to accommodate the NSMV. These projects are state-funded with partial Federal reimbursement.
