= Massachusetts Maritime Academy =

Public college in Buzzards Bay, Massachusetts, US

Coordinates: 41°44′23″N 70°37′27″W

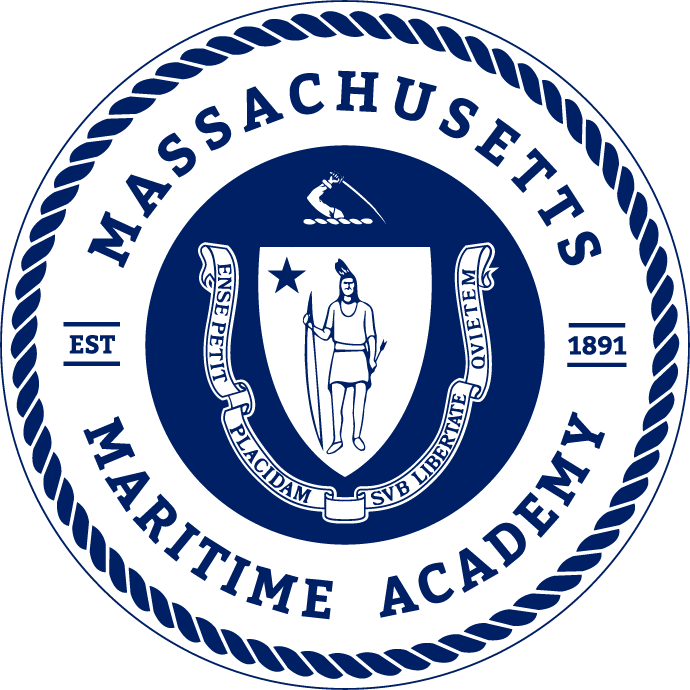
- Former names: Massachusetts Nautical Training School (1891–1913); Massachusetts Nautical School (1913–1942)
- Motto: Discipline, Knowledge, Leadership
- Type: Public university
- Established: June 11, 1891; 135 years ago
- Accreditation: NECHE
- Endowment: $13,051,554 (2014)
- President: Francis X. McDonald
- Students: 1,493 (fall 2024)
- Undergraduates: 1,407 (fall 2024)
- Postgraduates: 86 (fall 2024)
- Location: Buzzards Bay, Massachusetts, United States
- Campus: 54 acres (22 ha)
- Colors: Blue; Gold
- Nickname: Buccaneers
- Sporting affiliations: NCAA Division III - MASCAC; LEC; NEISA
- Website: maritime.edu

Massachusetts Maritime Academy (Mass Maritime, MMA) is a public university in Buzzards Bay, Massachusetts, focused on maritime-related fields. It was established in 1891 and is the second oldest state maritime academy in the United States. Originally established to graduate deck and engineering officers for the U.S. Merchant Marine, the academy has since expanded its curriculum. Though not required, many graduates go on to serve in the Merchant Marine or active and reserve components of the U.S. Armed Forces.

== History ==
The university was initially established on June 11, 1891, as the Massachusetts Nautical Training School, the result of an act passed by the state legislature. The first class of cadets passed through the school, which was initially located in Boston, in April 1893. Under its initial structure, the school was led by a superintendent who was then overseen by a board of commissioners appointed by the governor of Massachusetts; this structure would remain until 1942.

In 1913, the school's name changed for the first time, becoming the Massachusetts Nautical School.

By 1942, all state maritime academies became the responsibility of the federal government. At the time of this relinquishment of state control, the school was relocated from Boston to Hyannis, where it was subsequently renamed as the Massachusetts Maritime Academy. The academy would remain in Hyannis, on the former campus of the Hyannis State Teachers College, until 1949, when it moved to its present location in Buzzards Bay.

By 1964, the school rejoined the Division of State Colleges of the Commonwealth of Massachusetts while receiving permission to award four-year bachelors of science degrees. In 1977, the university first admitted women as cadets.

== Regiment of Cadets ==
All residential students are members of the academy's Regiment of Cadets. Within the Regiment, cadets supervise other cadets in a broad variety of activities, including the orientation of freshmen, room inspections, Morning Formation, daily cleaning stations, study hours, sea term planning and shipboard responsibilities. Students who seek to enroll in the Facilities Engineering or the Emergency Management programs as non-uniformed commuter students must apply in writing for admission to that status.

Academy freshmen, called "Youngies" (short for "young ladies and gentlemen"), arrive at the academy in mid-August for Orientation, a two-week military-style indoctrination program that is physically and mentally demanding. It encompasses regimental training, military drill, and physical fitness. It also serves as an introduction to shipboard/maritime safety, nomenclature, and customs. The indoctrination period and cadet candidate program is essential to the preparation for the youngies' first semester at sea (sea term) in January.

After Orientation, the academic year begins. For the rest of their first academic year as fourth class cadets, Youngies continue to be required to adhere to stringent rules affecting many aspects of their daily life.

Second class cadets (juniors) are designated Squad Leaders and are in charge of the training of the Youngies. First class cadets (seniors) hold cadet officer positions within the regiment and/or aboard the training ship.

=== Special units ===
==== Regimental Band and Chorus ====
Composed of an average of 40 members, the MMA Band and Chorus is the musical ensemble of the academy and the official music department at MMA. It takes part in ceremonial events at MMA as well as change of command, military retirements, and funerals at Massachusetts National Cemetery along with other major events nationwide. The band also provides music for community events around the New England, region.

The band consists of the following ensembles:

- Ceremonial Field and Concert Band
- Chamber Chorus
- Jazz Ensemble "First Watch"
- Buccaneers Brass Band

==== Alpha Platoon ====
The MMA Drill Team, Alpha Platoon is the regiment's exhibition drill unit whose members are selected after a semester of mastering drill and ceremony.

==== Honour guard ====
The honour guard is primarily a ceremonial color guard consisting of at least 6 cadets. They are responsible for the posting of the colours during athletic events. It also maintains a sabre team for other events at the MMA.

== Academics ==
Undergraduate demographics as of Fall 2023
Race and ethnicity	Total
White	80%
Unknown	7%
Hispanic	6%
Two or more races	3%
International student	2%
American Indian/Alaska Native	1%
Asian	1%
Black	1%
Economic diversity
Low-income (Note: The percentage of students who received an income-based federal Pell grant intended for low-income students.)	17%
Affluent (Note: The percentage of students who are a part of the American middle class at the bare minimum.)	83%

Prior to the expansion of its offered majors in 1990, the academy was exclusively a merchant marine college, tasked with the training of future cargo ship officers. The academy only offered majors in the ship transport subjects of Marine Transportation and Marine Engineering. The academy now offers more majors focused on maritime subjects including graduate degrees. The seven majors offered at the Massachusetts Maritime Academy are Marine Transportation (MTRA), Marine Engineering (MENG), International Maritime Business (IMBU), Energy Systems Engineering (ESE), Facilities Engineering (FENG), Emergency Management (EM), and Marine Science Safety and Environmental Protection (MSSEP). Massachusetts Maritime Academy is accredited by the New England Commission of Higher Education.

=== Sea term ===
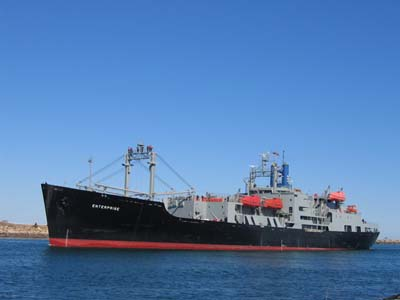
USTS Enterprise in 2005

Sea terms are conducted between the two academic semesters, in January and February. Cadets register soon after the New Year holiday and prepare the NSMV Patriot State for sailing, including loading provisions in the freezers and dry stores spaces. The ship sails for foreign ports of the Caribbean Sea three out of four years, and one in four formerly traveled to the Mediterranean Sea. At least one of the Caribbean voyages includes the Panama Canal and an Equator crossing.

The voyage lasts about 52 days on average, and during that time a cadet will rotate through class and laboratory training at sea, ships operations including deck and engine watches, maintenance and emergency drills. Port visits offer a time to relax, but still include watch responsibilities and ship's maintenance.

==== Training ships ====
- USS Enterprise (17 October 1892 – 4 May 1909)
- USS Ranger (26 April 1909 – 29 October 1917) rechristened to Rockport
  - Rockport (30 October 1917 – 20 February 1918) rechristened to USS Nantucket during World War I
  - USS Nantucket (21 February 1918–1920s) rechristened to Bay State
  - Bay State (1920s–1941) rechristened to TV Emery Rice upon her transfer to the US Merchant Marine Academy
- Keystone State (1942) former USCGC Seneca, borrowed from Pennsylvania Maritime Academy
- American Pilot (1943–1945) former Empire State
- American Mariner (1946) former George Calvert
- Yankee States (1947) former USS Sirona, shared with Maine Maritime Academy
- SC 1321 (1946–1948)
- USS Charleston (1949–1957)
- USTS Bay State II (1957–1973) former USS Doyen
- USTS Bay State III (1974–1978) former Empire State IV, former USS Henry Gibbins
- USTS Empire State V (1979) former USNS Barrett, borrowed from SUNY Maritime
- USTS Bay State IV (1980–1981) former Barrett class USNS Geiger, destroyed by fire, December 1981
- USTS State of Maine (1982–1983) former Barrett class USNS Upshur, borrowed from Maine Maritime Academy
- USTS Empire State V (1984) borrowed again from SUNY Maritime
- USTS State of Maine (1985) borrowed again from Maine Maritime Academy
- USTS Patriot State (1986–1998) former Santa Mercedes
- USTS Empire State VI (1999–2003) borrowed from SUNY Maritime
- USTS Enterprise (2003–2008) former USNS Cape Bon, former SS Velma Lykes
  - USTS Kennedy (2009–2023) rechristened from Enterprise in honor of the Kennedy family, Reassigned to Texas Maritime in 2023
- NSMV Patriot State II (2024–present) Second of the National Security Multi-Mission Vessel class—an entirely new design and class of vessel which is optimized to be a training platform and to respond to national disasters.

=== Shanghai exchange program ===
The academy offered an exchange program which is no longer available to Shanghai Maritime University, an 18,000-student school situated next to a deep-water port. Cadets would spend 100 days in the Shanghai program taking maritime business, law, and marketing classes and exploring the country to gain the experience they would need in the international maritime field. Four months later, Chinese cadets would make the trek to Taylor's Point and spend a semester at Massachusetts Maritime Academy. They became immersed into American culture, featuring trips to Boston, New York, Washington DC, and Plymouth Plantation.

== Campus alternative and renewable energy ==
Massachusetts Maritime Academy has done a great deal of work to incorporate green and safe energy to the campus. The campus green energy initiative consists of solar panels on top of the dormitories that provide 81 kilowatts of solar power to the campus. The academy also owns a 660 kilowatt wind turbine that provides nearly 20 percent of the campus's electricity.

Combined heat and power has been installed in the dormitories. Micro-turbines (small scale combustion turbines) generate electricity for the campus while utilizing the waste heat and flue exhaust to heat the hot water used in the dormitories.

The American Bureau of Shipping (ABS) Information Commons is a LEED (Leadership in Energy and Environmental Design) Platinum Building. The 42,000 square foot building opened in September 2011 and was a 23 million dollar project. The construction of the building used 100% recycled steel; 20% recycled concrete; and 40% recycled insulation. The wood in the building is all bamboo as well. The building is cooled and heated by a geothermal system along with chilled beam technology. Additional light sensors and natural light are provided with skylights reducing the need for artificial lighting when enough natural light is present. The building is furnished with water conserving fixtures and the landscaping uses no irrigation for the planted areas. Water captured from the roof irrigates plantings adjacent to the building. In addition, the pitch of the roof of the ABS Information Commons increases the airflow directed towards the wind turbine by 8%.

Massachusetts Maritime Academy is also in the process of drilling 252 geothermal wells. In an effort to modernize the campus and provide air conditioning to many currently unconditioned buildings while reducing the Carbon Footprint, the Massachusetts State Government has invested 39 Million dollars to redo a parking lot next to the gym, and install these geothermal wells underneath. These wells are projected to reduce the utility rates of the Academy by $50,000 per year.

== Athletics ==
The Massachusetts Maritime Academy fields 15 varsity athletic teams (7 men's, 7 women's, 1 co-ed) competing in the Massachusetts State Collegiate Athletic Conference at the NCAA Division III level.

== Notable alumni ==
- William P. Doyle, commissioner of the Federal Maritime Commission
- William J. Flanagan Jr., Admiral, USN (retired), MMA class of 1964; served as Commander in Chief, U.S. Atlantic Fleet (CINCLANTFLT) 1994–1996
- Lee Van Gemert, Class of 1940. Author of "Stability and Trim for the Ship's Officer", the Merchant Marine standard textbook on the subject; also one of the co-founders of the Sierra Bravo Delta Club
- Christine M. Griffin, past deputy director of the United States Office of Personnel Management
- Captain Richard Phillips, Maersk Alabama captain during Somali piracy attack
- Captain Emery Rice, Commander, USNR, MMA, Class of 1891, Quartermaster of USS Olympia at the Battle of Manila Bay, received the Navy Cross
