= TS State of Maine =

Training ship of the Maine Maritime Academy

Coordinates: 44°23.17′N 68°47.79′W

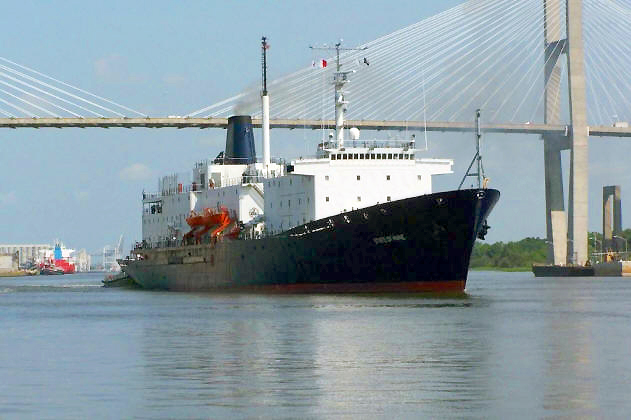
- TS State of Maine

History

United States
- Name: Tanner
- Namesake: Capt Z.L. Tanner, USN, 1833 – 1906
- Ordered: 28 June 1985
- Builder: Bethlehem Steel Corporation
- Laid down: 22 October 1986
- Launched: 28 February 1989
- Acquired: 31 August 1990
- Out of service: 1993
- Stricken: 1 October 1993
- Fate: Delivered to MARAD 11 January 1995

United States
- Name: State of Maine
- Namesake: Maine
- Owner: United States Maritime Administration
- Operator: Maine Maritime Academy
- Acquired: 6 June 1997
- Identification: IMO number: 8835217; MMSI number: 368946000; Callsign: WCAH
- Status: Inactive

General characteristics USNS Tanner (T-AGS-40)
- Displacement: 9,319 tons (light); 15,928 tons (full)
- Length: 499 ft 10 in (152.35 m)
- Beam: 72 ft (22 m)
- Draft: 30 ft (9.1 m)
- Installed power: 1 × MAK 6M601 Turbo Diesel engine
- Propulsion: single shaft, 17,000 hp (13,000 kW)hp
- Speed: 20 kn (37 km/h; 23 mph)
- Complement: 298 (crew and students)

General characteristics TS State of Maine
- Tonnage: 12,542 GT; 3,762 NT
- Displacement: 16,258.9 long tons (16,519.8 t)
- Length: 499 ft 10 in (152.35 m)
- Draft: 28 ft (8.5 m)
- Installed power: MAK 601 C Diesel 8,046 hp (6,000 kW)
- Propulsion: Single LIPS controllable reversible pitch propeller
- Speed: 16 kn (30 km/h; 18 mph)
- Complement: 288 (crew and scientists)

TS State of Maine is the former training ship of Maine Maritime Academy. Originally commissioned by the United States Navy as USNS Tanner (T-AGS-40), the ship assumed her present name and role in June 1997. It served as the training ship of Maine Maritime Academy from 1997 until its final training cruise in summer 2024, when it was replaced by the new State of Maine (NSMV 3), a purpose-built National Security Multi-Mission Vessel.

== History ==
=== Previous ships ===
Several ships have borne the name State of Maine since the Maine Maritime Academy was founded in 1941. Previous vessels included the former USS Comfort (AH-6), which served in the role from 1953 to 1963; USS Ancon (AGC-4); and USNS Upshur (T-AP-198).

=== TS State of Maine ===
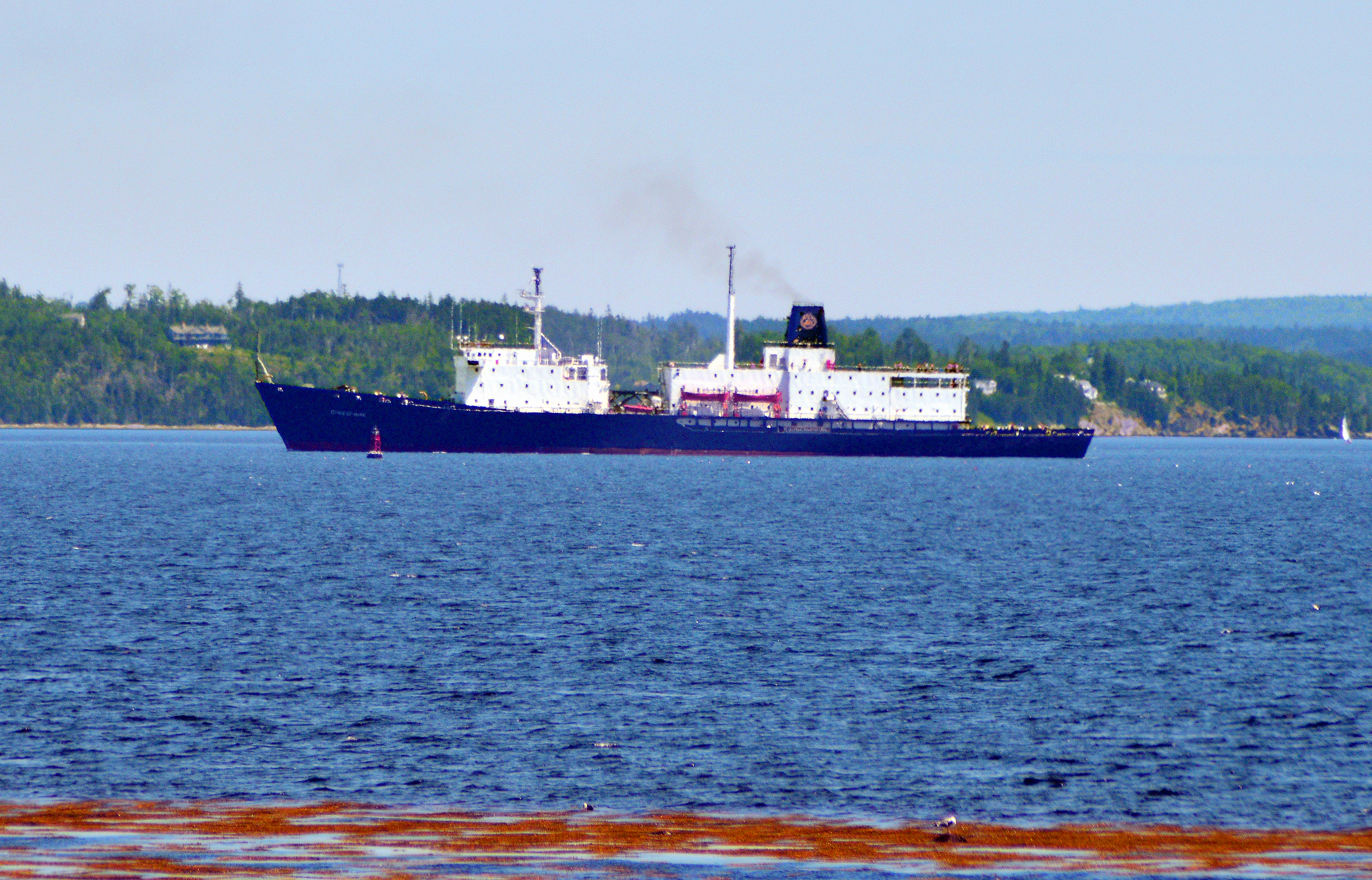
State of Maine arriving home from her 2018 Summer North Atlantic Training Cruise after a 13-day voyage from Alicante, Spain

USNS Tanner (T-AGS-40), was built for the United States Navy as a fast oceanographic research vessel by Bethlehem Steel Corporation at its Sparrows Point Yard in Maryland in 1990. The vessel was the second oceanographic research ship to bear the name of Zera Luther Tanner, a noted oceanographer and inventor of a patented sounding machine. The vessel experienced catastrophic engine failure in 1993 and was laid up by the Navy and eventually transferred ownership to the Maritime Administration (MARAD).

The ship lay idle in the James River Reserve Fleet until 1996 when she began a conversion process, which removed her underwater sonar domes and equipment. The two original engines were removed and a new power plant was installed. The newer engine is significantly less powerful than the old engines. The sister ship, USNS Maury (T-AGS-39), now the third vessel of the name TS Golden Bear, retained the original and more powerful enterprise engines.

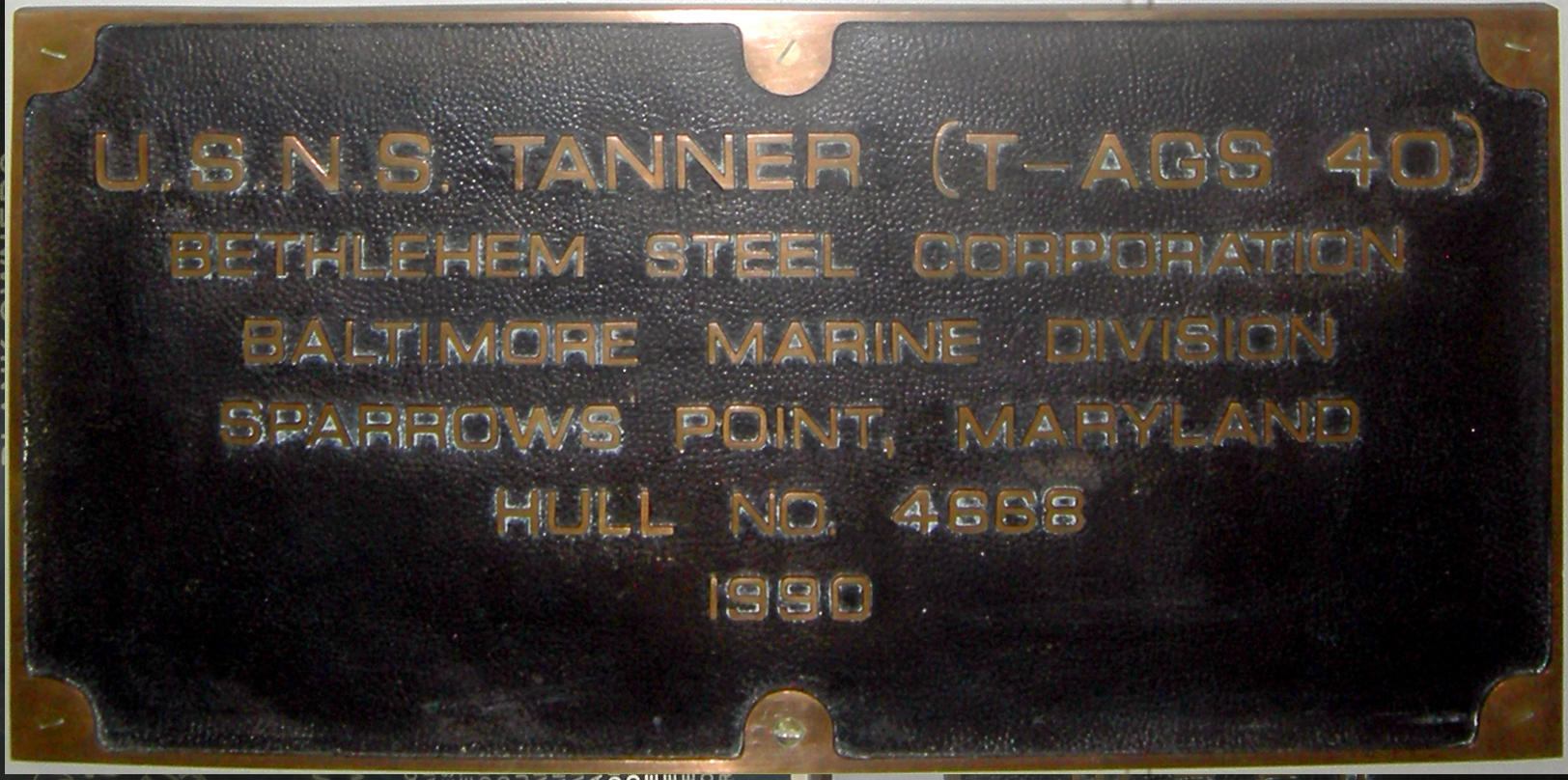
Shipbuilder's plate as USNS Tanner 1990

The vessel was modified to increase the accommodations from 108 to 302 persons. New lifesaving equipment and upgrades to existing equipment were accomplished as well as enhancements to the habitability requirements of the vessel. She was delivered to Maine Maritime Academy on 6 June 1997 and sailed her maiden training cruise the following week.

State of Maine was called into active duty by the Maritime Administration (MARAD) following Hurricane Katrina and provided living quarters for oil rig workers, who were working to repair damaged rigs, and for Federal Law Enforcement Officers assisting in New Orleans.

== Vessel information ==
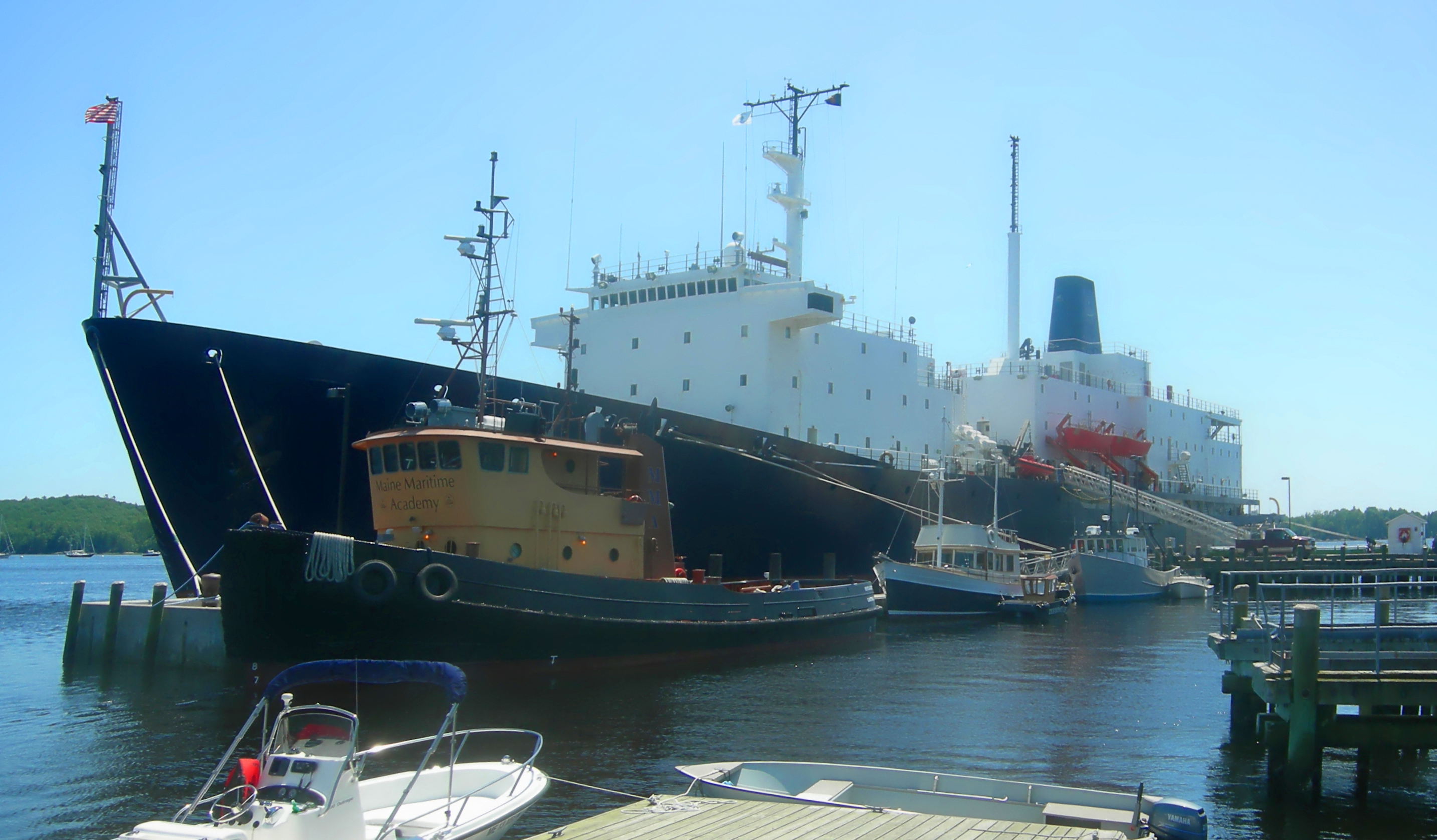
TS State of Maine in her home port of Castine, ME

The ship was normally docked at her pier in Castine when not on a training cruise or in drydock. State of Maine is classed with the American Bureau of Shipping, and all inspections of her hull and equipment are undertaken by this classification society. The ship entered drydock for scheduled maintenance and inspections following the summer cruise of 2007. She also entered drydock following the Summer Cruise of 2012, keeping within the inspection schedule required by US Coast Guard Regulations. Most recently, she entered drydock at the conclusion of her 2017 summer cruise. She was observed in the dry dock at South Boston MA undergoing repairs during the first week of July 2022 before she returned to service in November of 2022.

She made her final voyage in summer 2024.

== Replacement ship ==
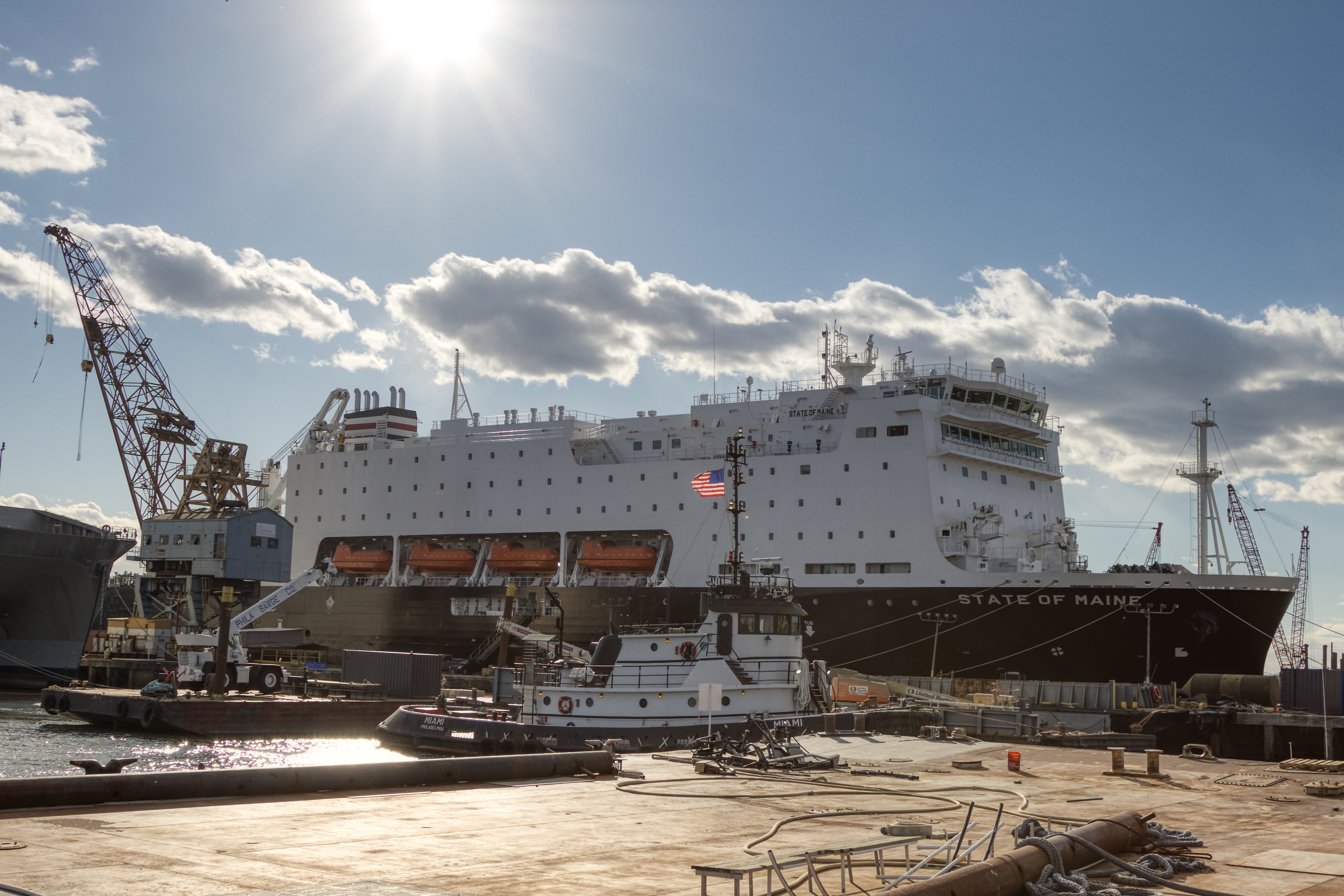
The State of Maine at the Hanwah Shipyard in Philadelphia.

The fifth State of Maine was constructed primarily at the Hanwha Philly Shipyard in Philadelphia PA beginning in 2023 under the National Security Multi-Mission Vessel program. The ship is the fifth training ship to carry this name and was officially named (christened) on 26 August 2025 in Philadelphia with remarks by United States Department of Transportation Secretary Sean P. Duffy and President Lee Jae Myung of South Korea. Delivery to Maine Maritime Academy, happened on March 30, 2026 in Portland, Maine.

== Sister ship ==
State of Maine's sister ship is TS Golden Bear, the training ship of the California Maritime Academy. Golden Bear was formerly USNS Maury.
