= State of Maine (ship) =

National Security Multi-Mission Vessel training ship

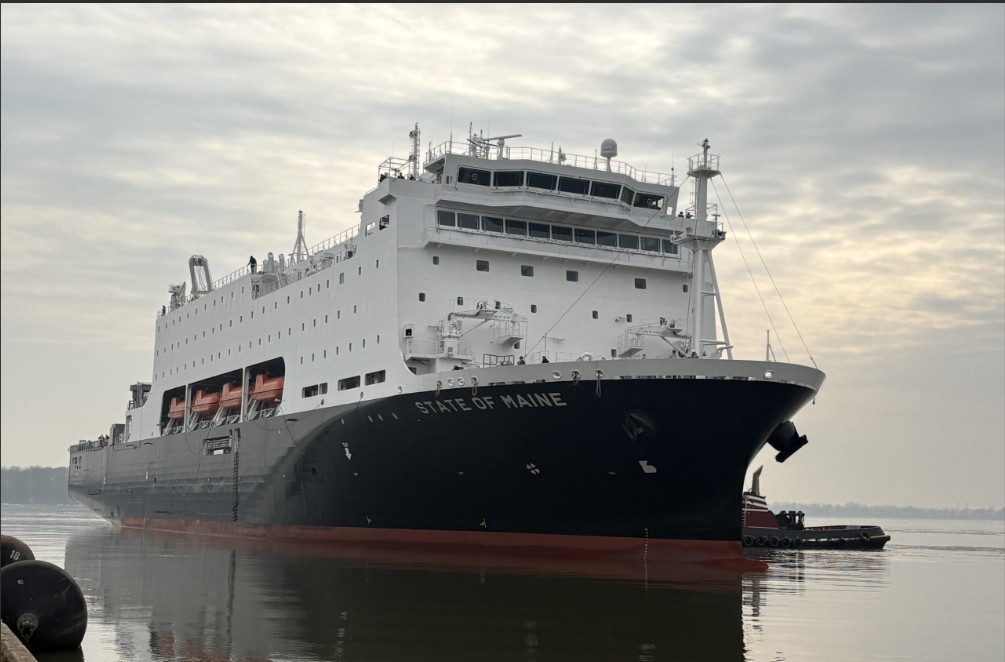
- State of Maine arriving at Portland, Maine in March 2026

History
- Name: State of Maine
- Namesake: Maine
- Owner: United States Maritime Administration (MARAD)
- Operator: Maine Maritime Academy
- Builder: Hanwha Philly Shipyard, Philadelphia
- Laid down: 1 May 2023
- Christened: 26 August 2025
- In service: 30 March 2026
- Home port: Castine, Maine
- Identification: Call sign: WDU2012; IMO number: 9929546
- Status: In service

General characteristics
- Class & type: National Security Multi-Mission Vessel (NSMV III)
- Tonnage: 25,985 GT; 7,795 NT
- Displacement: 19,585 t (19,276 long tons) (load line)
- Length: 160.05 m (525 ft 1 in) overall; 154 m (505 ft 3 in) between perpendiculars
- Beam: 27 m (88 ft 7 in)
- Draft: 7.35 m (24 ft 1 in) (summer load line)
- Depth: 16.8 m (55 ft 1 in) (main deck)
- Installed power: 16,800 kW (22,500 hp) total
- Propulsion: 4 × GE Wabtec diesel generators; 2 × GE Energy propulsion motors; single propeller (5.85 m diameter); bow and stern thrusters
- Speed: 18 knots (33 km/h; 21 mph) (design)
- Range: 11,000 nmi (20,000 km; 13,000 mi) (at 18 knots, class standard)
- Capacity: 600 cadets + up to 160 crew/faculty/staff (max 760 personnel); designed for training and humanitarian aid/disaster relief (HADR)
- Complement: 100 officers, faculty, staff, and crew (typical)

State of Maine (also known as NSMV 3 or Training Ship State of Maine) is the third of five National Security Multi-Mission Vessels built for the U.S. state maritime academies. It serves as the primary training ship for Maine Maritime Academy (MMA) cadets while also being available for federal humanitarian assistance and disaster relief (HADR) missions. It is the first purpose-built training vessel for the academy and replaces the previous State of Maine, which served from 1997 until 2024.

== History ==
The vessel was christened on 26 August 2025 at Hanwha Philly Shipyard in Philadelphia in a ceremony attended by U.S. and South Korean dignitaries. It arrived in Portland, Maine, on 21 March 2026 for its first home-state port call and was formally delivered to Maine Maritime Academy on 30 March 2026 in a handover ceremony at Ocean Gateway. The vessel succeeds the earlier training ship of the same name, the State of Maine, a converted oceanographic research vessel that operated for Maine Maritime Academy for 27 years until its final cruise in 2024. It is the fifth ship to carry the State of Maine name for the academy.

The $330 million ship is the first purpose-built training vessel for MMA and replaces the academy’s previous training ship. It features a training bridge and engine room. It can accommodate up to 600 cadets, although its capacity can be increased to 1,000 if needed.

== Design and capabilities ==
State of Maine is designed to modernize maritime training at state academies while supporting national security and disaster-response missions. It is one of five identical NSMVs built under the Maritime Administration’s program.
