= Hyannis State Teachers College =

Defunct college in Massachusetts, United States

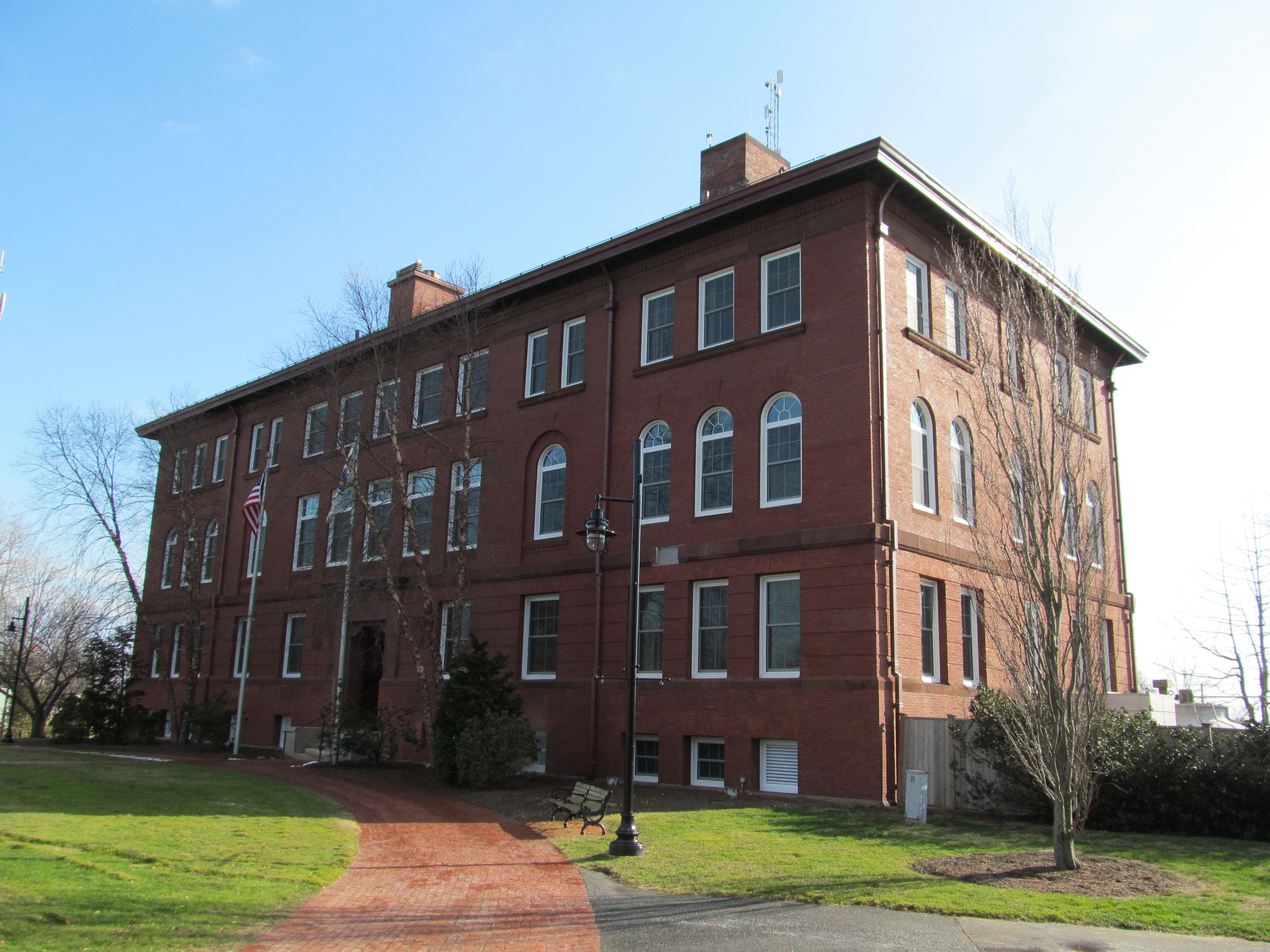
- Main building of the former college, now Barnstable Town Hall
- Former name: Hyannis State Normal School
- Type: Public College
- Active: 1897–1944
- Location: Barnstable, Massachusetts, United States; 41°39′5.67″N 70°16′59.01″W

The Hyannis State Teachers College is a former college located in Barnstable, Massachusetts. It operated under various names from 1897 to 1944. It operated as the Hyannis State Normal School from 1897 to 1932 and the Hyannis State Teachers College from 1932–1944. It used to have a Physical Education program, which was transferred to nearby Bridgewater State College (now University) after its closure. It was forced to close in 1944 due to declining enrollment at the school.

During its operation, there was a public elementary school to the east which was constructed to be used alongside the school. Mysteriously, the school burned a few weeks after opening, but it was rebuilt. The building was later replaced by the Hyannis Elementary School a few miles away and the building was torn down.

== Post usage ==
During the last two years of operation, the college shared its grounds with the Massachusetts Maritime Academy, which continued using the site until 1948 when a newer ship required a move to its present location on Buzzards Bay. After the Academy moved, the site was used by the town until 1960. It was reused again as the temporary headquarters for Cape Cod Community College until 1970. After the college vacated the site, the town of Barnstable used the present town hall building the Barnstable Middle School Annex. When the Barnstable Middle School was built in 1976, the building closed down as a school for good. It was dedicated as the town hall and school administration buildings on September 29, 1979. The former dormitories are the location of the administration building while the site of the classrooms is the location of town hall.
