= Empire State VII =

US Maritime Service vessel

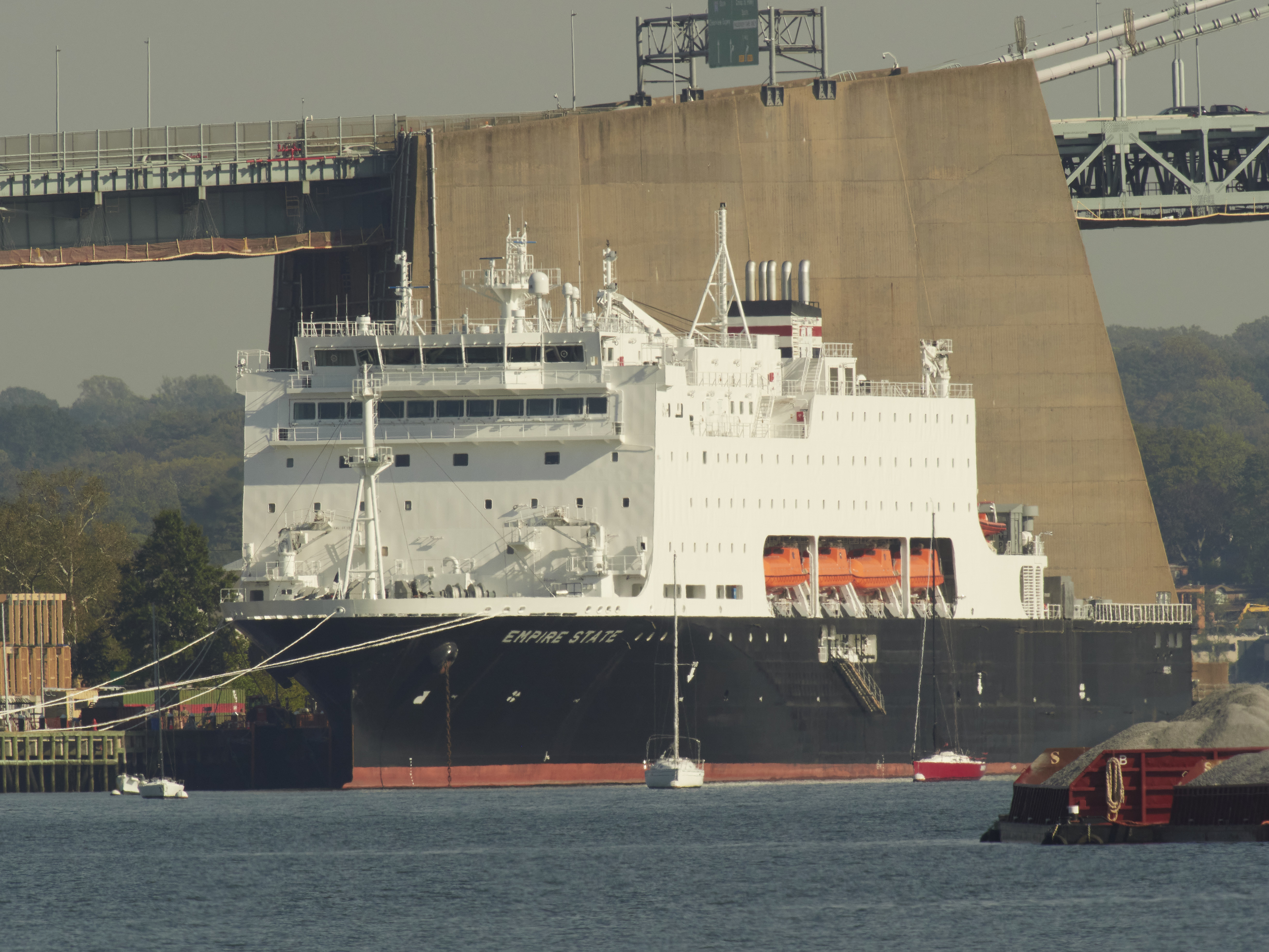
- Empire State docked at SUNY Maritime College in October 2023

History

United States
- Name: Empire State VII
- Owner: U.S. Maritime Administration
- Operator: SUNY Maritime College
- Ordered: April 2020
- Builder: Philly Shipyard, Philadelphia, Pennsylvania
- Cost: US$315M
- Yard number: 33
- Laid down: 10 December 2021
- Launched: 24 September 2022
- Completed: End of June 2023
- Acquired: September 18 2023
- Home port: Fort Schuyler, The Bronx, New York City, New York
- Identification: IMO number: 9910313

General characteristics
- Class & type: NSMV, Training Ship/Troopship
- Length: 160.05 m (525.1 ft)
- Beam: 27 m (89 ft)
- Height: 38.4 m (126 ft)
- Draft: 6.5 m (21 ft)
- Depth: 16.8 m (55 ft)
- Decks: 10 Decks (6 above main deck, 3 below main deck)
- Ramps: RoRo
- Installed power: 16,800 kW (Electrical), 9,000 KW (Propulsion)
- Propulsion: 4 x Wabtec 16V250 Gensets, single screw
- Speed: 18 knots (33 km/h; 21 mph)
- Complement: 700 (600 cadets, 100 officers, staff crew (training); 1000 (disaster relief)
- Aviation facilities: Helipad

Empire State VII, callsign WDO2002, IMO number 9910313, is a training ship owned by the United States Maritime Administration and operated by SUNY Maritime College. She is the first vessel in the National Security Multi-Mission Vessel (NSMV) class and has replaced the 1961-built Empire State VI. The new training ship is the seventh vessel to carry the name Empire State for the SUNY Maritime College but its first purpose-built new build. The previous training ships had been converted cargo or military vessels. While SUNY refers to the ship as Empire State VII, US Coast Guard regulations do not allow use of Roman numerals in a ship’s name. Thus, the vessel displays her name as "Empire State" without a numeral.

The preliminary and basic NSMV design was developed by the Herbert Engineering Corp. of Alameda, California, and the rest of the design was completed by DSEC headquartered in Busan, Korea. While primarily a training ship the NSMV class is also to be equipped for disaster relief: a Roll-on/Roll-off side ramp, container space and crane, and a helipad.

The contract for the first two NSMV vessels was signed with Philly Shipyard (Philadelphia, Pennsylvania) in April 2020 with anticipated delivery in Spring of 2023. Steel cutting for the first vessel began in December 2020. Its keel was laid on 10 December 2021 and launched on 24 September 2022. The vessel was delivered to the SUNY's pier on 18 September 2023. In January 2024 she sailed to San Juan, Puerto Rico for her maiden voyage and as part of the Regiment of Cadets' winter sea term.

Sea Term Itineraries:

- Winter 2024: San Juan, Puerto Rico
- Summer 2024: Nassau, The Bahamas - Port Canaveral, Florida - Portland, Maine - St. George's, Bermuda
- Summer 2025: New Orleans, Louisiana - Ponta Delgada, Portugal - Bergen, Norway
- Summer 2026: Charleston, SC - Malaga, Spain - Belfast, UK

On August 28, 2026, SUNY Maritime College announced that the United States Maritime Administration (MarAd) was activating the Empire State VII for Federal Service for a period of approximately 170 days starting sometime around September 1, 2026. No further details about the activation were provided, but it has been speculated that the ship may deploy to Diego Garcia in the Indian Ocean to support US Military operations in the region.
