= Deborah Doane Dempsey =

American ship captain and mariner

- Born: 1949 (age 76–77); Connecticut, United States
- Education: University of Vermont (BA); Maine Maritime Academy (BS)
- Occupation: Ship captain
- Known for: First woman to achieve the rank of Master Mariner, first woman to graduate from a U.S. maritime academy
- Spouse: Jack Dempsey
- Awards: See list

Deborah Doane Dempsey (born 1949) is an American mariner and ship captain. She was the first American woman to achieve the rank of Master Mariner and command a cargo ship sailing internationally.

== Early life and education ==
Deborah Doane was born in Connecticut in 1949. In 1978, she married Jack Dempsey.

In 1971, Dempsey received a B.A. from the University of Vermont. In 1976, Dempsey received a B.S. degree from the Maine Maritime Academy as valedictorian of her class. At the time of her graduation as a cadet, she became the first woman in the United States to graduate from any maritime or service academy.

== Maritime career ==
Dempsey began her career with Exxon Mobil as a Third Mate. She later moved to Lykes Brothers Steamship Company, where she advanced to a Master Mariner, becoming the first American woman to achieve the rank and to command a cargo ship on international voyages.

She was the first woman to become a regular member of the Council of American Master Mariners. She also served as a ship captain during the Gulf War and Desert Shield, and later worked as a professional ship pilot on the Columbia River Bar for over 20 years. She was also a navigator for the Newport Bermuda Race for the U.S. Women's Challenge Team. In March 2012, Dempsey fell into the Pacific Ocean while transferring vessels. The crew performed rescue maneuvers and had Dempsey out of the water within minutes.

=== Rescue effort ===
In January 1993, Dempsey gained national recognition when she and her crew of four successfully rescued a drifting 634-foot freighter (with over 387,000 gallons of oil on board) threatening to ground on Frying Pan Shoals off the coast of North Carolina. She received a letter of commendation from President Bill Clinton for her efforts. Dempsey was credited with not only saving the 22 million dollar vessel but also with preventing a possible oil spill that could have devastated the North Carolina Coast.

== Board memberships ==
Dempsey has served on the boards of various organizations and agencies, including the Bellingham Bay Community Boating Center, Oregon Board of Maritime Pilots, NOAA Hydrographic Services Review Panel (HSRP), and the HSRP Strategic Effectiveness Working Group.

== Awards, honors, and distinctions ==
Dempsey is the recipient of various awards and distinctions, including:

- First female graduate of any maritime or service academy in the United States
- First female to attain the rank of Master Mariner
- Honorary Doctor of Science degree, Maine Maritime Academy (1994)
- Keynote speaker, Maritime Administration Women on the Water Conference
- Recipient, Navy Meritorious Public Service Award
- Recipient, Lalonde "Spirit of the Seas" Award
- Recipient, Reader's Digest “Heroes for Today” Award
- Recipient, United Seaman's Service AOTOS Honored Seamen Award
- Recipient, Seamen's Church Institute Lifesaving Award
- Recipient, American Merchant Marine Seamanship Trophy
- Inductee, Maine Maritime Academy Distinguished Alumni Wall of Honor
- Notable Naval Books of 1998, U.S. Naval Institute

== Works ==
- Dempsey, Deborah. The Captain’s a Woman: Tales of a Merchant Mariner. Annapolis, MD. Naval Institute Press. 1998.
