= Empire State V =

1950 Type P2-class transport

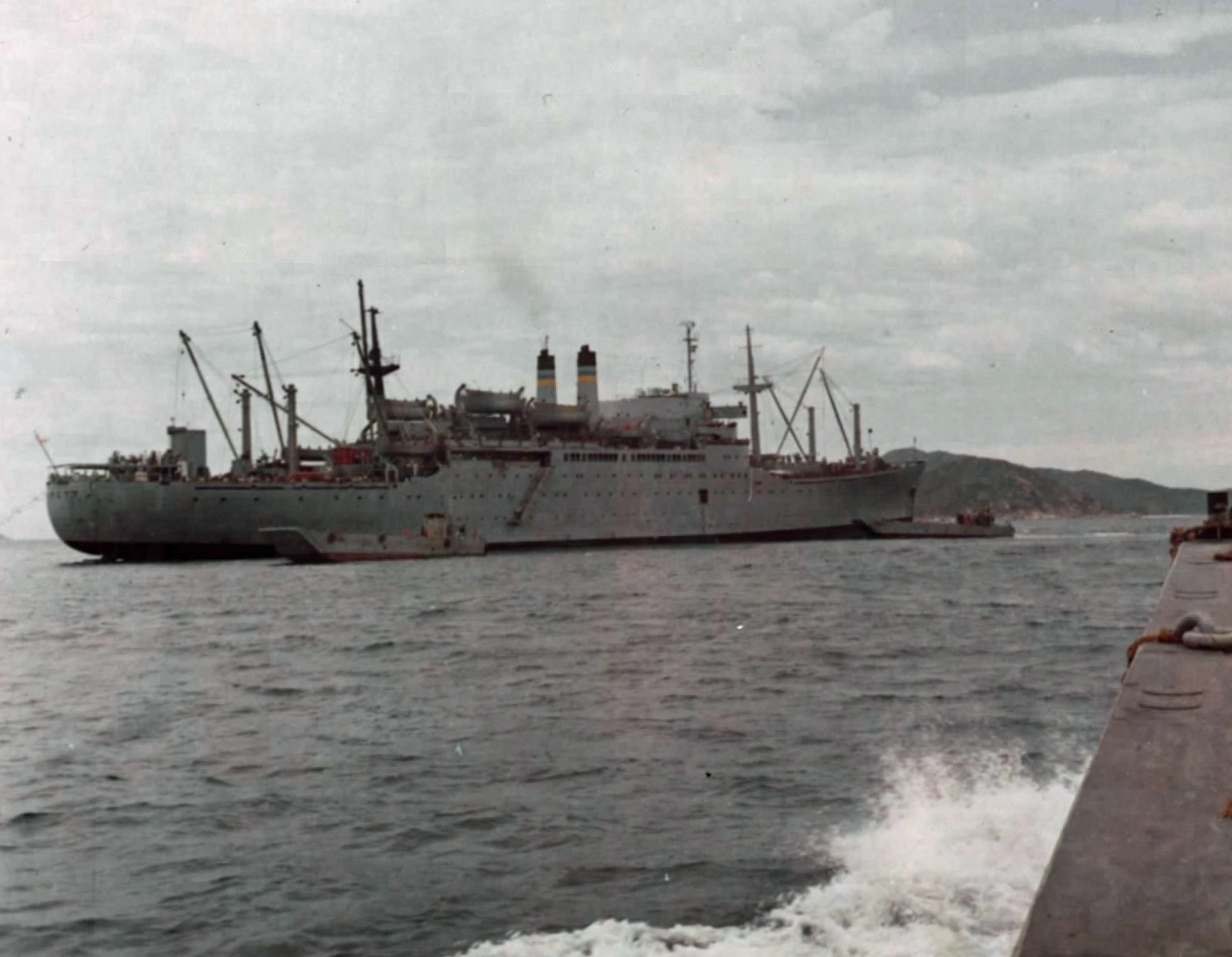
- USTS Empire State while serving as USS Barrett in Qui Nhon Bay in 1965

History

United States
- Name: Empire State V (ex Barrett)
- Owner: Maritime Administration
- Awarded: 18 August 1948
- Builder: New York Shipbuilding Corporation
- Laid down: 1 June 1949
- Launched: 27 June 1950
- Completed: 21 May 1952
- Out of service: 1990
- Stricken: 07/01/1973
- Identification: IMO number: 7941904
- Fate: Sold for scrap (June 2007)

General characteristics
- Type: Training Ship troop transport
- Displacement: 17600 tons full load, 6720 tons light
- Length: 534 ft (163 m)
- Beam: 73 ft (22 m)
- Draft: 27.1 ft (8.3 m)
- Installed power: 2 B&W WT Boilers, geared turbine
- Propulsion: Single Screw
- Speed: 19 knots
- Complement: 398 officers and civilians, 1506 enlisted (as built)
- Armament: none

TS Empire State V, was a troop ship of the US Navy and training vessel of the United States Maritime Service. She was laid down as the SS President Jackson, a cargo / passenger liner and finished as a troop transport, the USNS Barrett (T-AP-196).

There were three ships in the class with the Barrett (T-AP-196) having sister ships named USNS Geiger (T-AP-197) and USNS Upshur (T-AP-198). All three ships would later become training ships:

- Barrett to New York Maritime College
- Geiger to Massachusetts Maritime Academy
- Upshur to Maine Maritime Academy

She was converted to a training ship in 1973 serving as the training ship for the State University of New York Maritime College until 1990 when she was replaced by USTS Empire State VI. After serving New York Maritime she was placed in the Maritime Service's National Defense Reserve Fleet at James River until 2007 when she was sold for scrap.
