= Municipal Group Historic District =

Historic district in Massachusetts, United States

- U.S. National Register of Historic Places
- U.S. Historic district
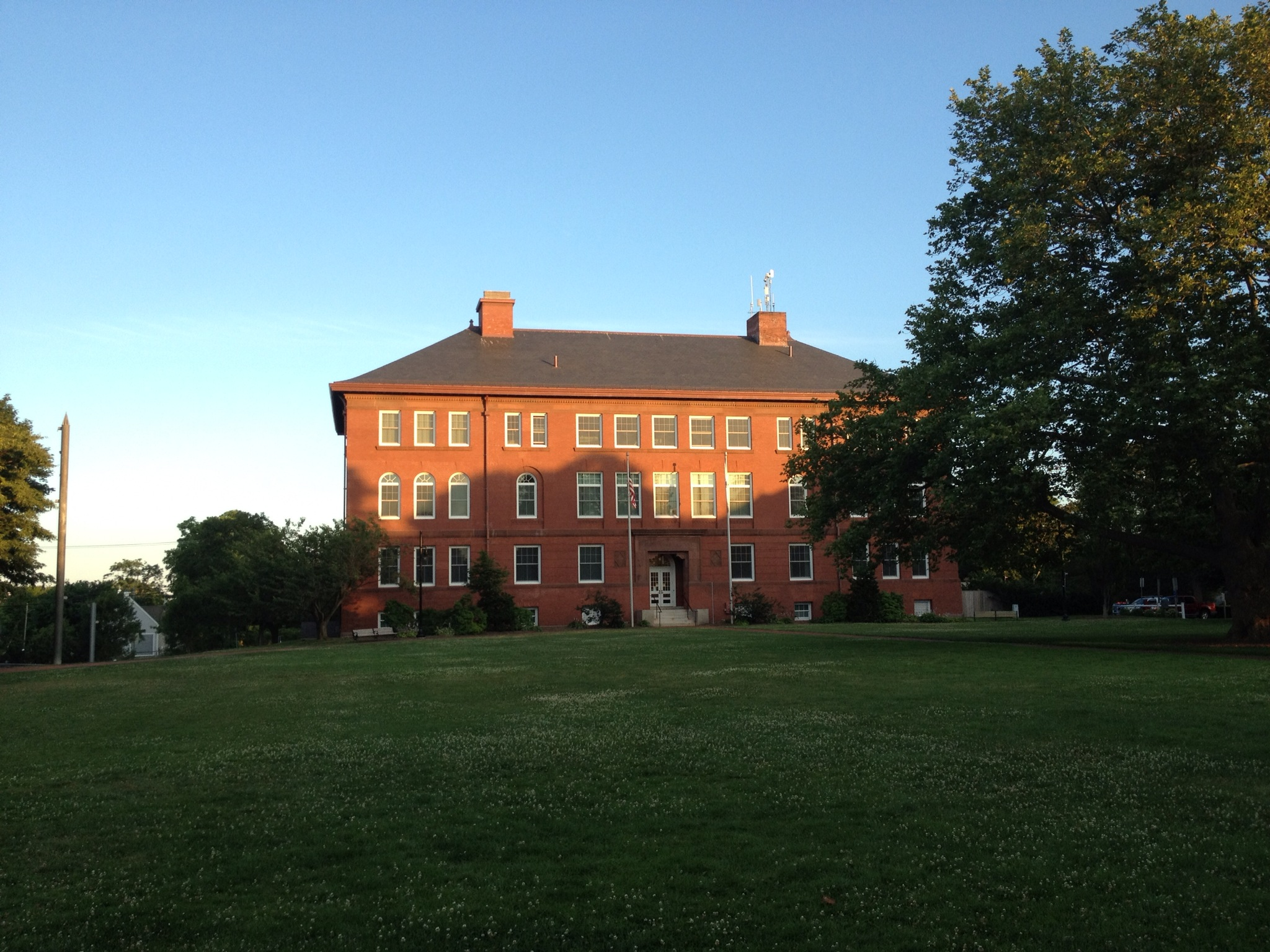
- Town Hall

- Location within Cape Cod Location within Massachusetts Location within the United States
- Location: Barnstable, Massachusetts
- Coordinates: 41°39′6″N 70°17′2″W
- Area: 8.25 acres (3.34 ha)
- Architect: Hartwell, Richardson & Driver
- Architectural style: Late 19th And 20th Century Revivals, Queen Anne
- MPS: Barnstable MRA
- NRHP reference No.: 87000288
- Added to NRHP: November 10, 1987

The Municipal Group Historic District is a historic district encompassing a cluster of five municipal buildings in the Hyannis village of Barnstable, Massachusetts. Included are the library (c. 1800), old town hall (1926), two buildings currently housing town offices that were originally part of the Hyannis Normal School, and the Crowell/Guyer Barn, a 19th-century structure now used by the local public works department. The district was listed on the National Register of Historic Places in 1987.

The library is housed in a former residence, built c. 1800, which was owned for many years by the Hallett family. It was purchased in 1908 for use as a library, and continues to fulfil that role, albeit with a modern addition to the rear that greatly expands its capacity. The Crowell/Guyer Barn is a 1-1/2 wood-frame structure with a front-gable roof that has decorative brackets under the eaves. It was built c. 1865, and its earliest documented owner was Captain Sidney Crowell, a ship master active in the coasting trade.

The "Old Town Hall" is a neo-Federal two story brick building, with a five-bay main block flanked by symmetrical single-story wings. Its entry is distinguished by a semi-circular portico supported by Corinthian columns. It was built in 1926 to replace the previous town hall, located in West Barnstable, that was built in 1899. It served as town hall until 1979, when the former buildings of the Hyannis Normal School were acquired to house town offices.

The two surviving buildings (out of three originally built) of the Hyannis Normal School were designed by Hartwell, Richardson and Driver, and built in 1897 after the state awarded Hyannis the location of a new normal school. The main building and former dormitory are large brick three-story buildings (one is eleven bays wide, the other thirteen), with slate hip roofs. They were used (along with the training school, an elementary school building that has not survived) until the school closed in 1944. After serving a variety of other purposes, they were acquired by the town in 1979. The former school's open space in front of these buildings now serves as the town green.

== See also ==
- National Register of Historic Places listings in Barnstable County, Massachusetts
