= William J. Flanagan Jr. =

American admiral

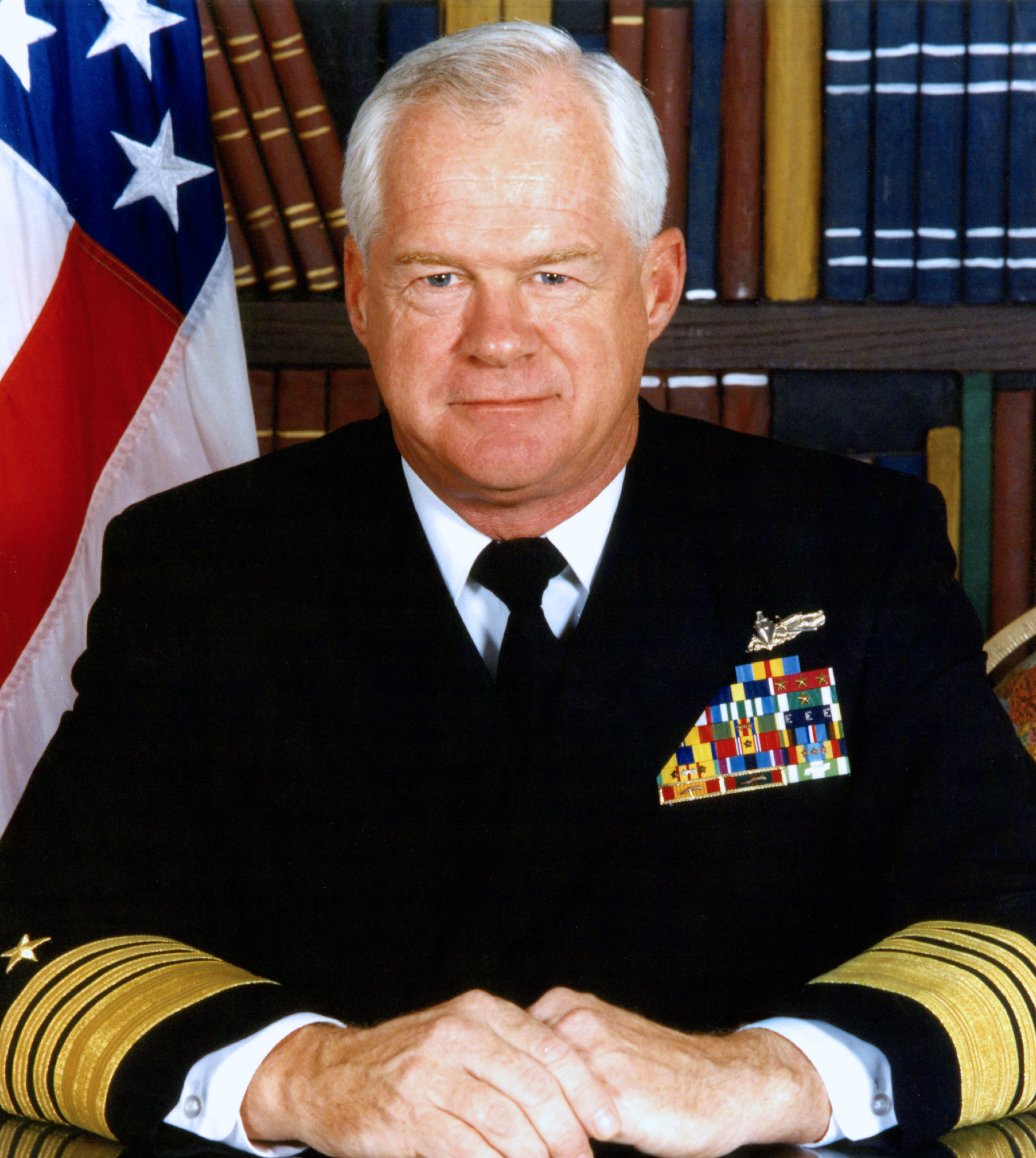
- Admiral William J. Flanagan Jr.
- Born: March 27, 1943 (age 83); Jesup, Georgia, U.S.
- Military career
- Allegiance: United States
- Branch: United States Navy
- Service years: 1967–1996
- Rank: Admiral
- Commands: United States Atlantic Fleet; USS Kidd (DDG-993)
- Conflicts: Vietnam War
- Awards: Defense Distinguished Service Medal; Navy Distinguished Service Medal; Legion of Merit (4)

Admiral William John Flanagan Jr. (born March 27, 1943) is a retired United States Navy four star admiral who served as Commander in Chief, United States Atlantic Fleet from 1994 to 1996.

== Early life and education ==
Flanagan was born in 1943 in Jesup, Georgia. In addition to his bachelor's degree in marine transportation from the Massachusetts Maritime Academy, Flanagan received a Master of Arts degree in political science from the American University in 1974 and graduated from Harvard Business School in 1980.

== Naval career ==
Flanagan graduated from the Massachusetts Maritime Academy in 1964 with a Bachelor of Science degree in marine transportation and an ensign's commission in the Naval Reserve, joining the Merchant Marine and working for American Export-Isbrandtsen Lines out of New York, where he achieved the grade of second mate. After three years of service with American Export Lines, Flanagan reported for active duty with the United States Navy on May 15, 1967 as a lieutenant (junior grade).

On June 27, 1981, Flanagan reported to commissioning crew of USS Kidd (DDG-993) as the ship's first commanding officer. He had now advanced to the rank of captain. Flannagan commanded the guided missile destroyer—the lead ship of her class—on her first deployment to the Mediterranean Sea and the Indian Ocean.

On October 5, 1994, Flanagan was promoted to the rank of admiral and was assigned as Commander in Chief of the Atlantic Fleet. At the end of his tenure in this position, he was responsible for more than 200,000 Navy and Marine Corps personnel, 220 vessels, 1,500 aircraft, and 27 shore installations. Flanagan stepped down from commanding the Atlantic Fleet on December 20, 1996, and retired shortly thereafter after approximately thirty years of naval service.

== Military awards ==
U.S. Military decorations

Defense Distinguished Service Medal
Navy Distinguished Service Medal
Legion of Merit (with three bronze award stars)
Meritorious Service Medal (with one gold award star)
Joint Service Commendation Medal
Navy Commendation Medal (with one gold award star)
Combat Action Ribbon
Meritorious Unit Commendation ribbon (with three bronze service stars)
Battle Efficiency ribbon (with three Battle E devices)
Navy Expeditionary Medal
National Defense Service Medal (with bronze service star)
Armed Forces Expeditionary Medal
Vietnam Service Medal (with four bronze service stars)
Humanitarian Service Medal
Navy Sea Service Deployment Ribbon
Vietnam Gallantry Cross Unit Citation (Republic of Vietnam)
Vietnam Civil Actions Unit Citation (Republic of Vietnam)
Vietnam Campaign Medal (Republic of Vietnam)
