= USNS Upshur =

Barrett-class troop transport ship

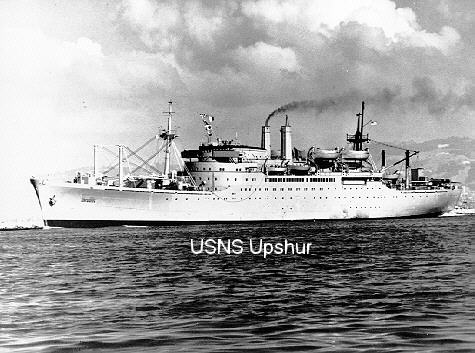
- US Navy Photo USNS Upshur (T-AP-198) underway at San Francisco, 1968

History

United States
- Name: Upshur
- Builder: New York Shipbuilding Corporation, Camden, New Jersey
- Laid down: 1 September 1949 as President Hayes
- Launched: 1 January 1951
- Out of service: 2 April 1973
- Reclassified: Transferred to the US Maritime Administration 2 April 1973 for loan to the Maine Maritime Academy
- Identification: IMO number: 7517064
- Honours and awards: National Defense Service Medal (2 awards)
- Fate: Scrapped in 2011

General characteristics
- Class & type: Barrett-class transport
- Displacement: 17,630 tons
- Length: 533.9 ft (162.7 m)
- Beam: 73.3 ft (22.3 m)
- Draught: 27.1 ft (8.3 m)
- Propulsion: Single screw steam turbine
- Speed: 19 knots (35 km/h; 22 mph)
- Complement: 203 civilian mariners and 27 US Navy personnel; 392 dependents / passengers; 1,500 troops

USNS Upshur (T-AP-198), was a Barrett-class transport named in honor of Major General William P. Upshur of the United States Marine Corps.

The hull of Upshur was laid down on 1 September 1949 by the New York Shipbuilding Corporation in Camden, New Jersey as the SS President Hayes. Designed in 1947 as a passenger-cargo ship for the American President Lines' post-World War II replacement program, before she was completed in her civilian configuration, she was requisitioned by the U.S. Navy at the outbreak of the Korean War and converted for troop and dependent transport. Reassigned to the US Navy and renamed USNS Upshur, she served the Military Sea Transportation Service from 1952 to 1973. Over her years of service she performed many routine missions, carrying military members and their families safely across the seas in an era when air travel was uncommon, as well as special missions, such as the emergency evacuation of military families from Guantanamo Bay Naval Base in 1962.

In 1973 USNS Upshur was placed out of service and transferred to the United States Maritime Administration (MARAD), and provided to the Maine Maritime Academy for use as a merchant marine training ship. Renamed TV State of Maine, she served from 1973 to 1995 in service of the academy, with temporary assignments to the Massachusetts Maritime Academy.

In 1995 ex-USNS Upshur was transferred to the U.S. Coast Guard and relocated to Mobile, Alabama as a platform for testing maritime firefighting technology by the U.S. Coast Guard Fire & Safety Test Detachment in Mobile.

In 2005, Hurricane Katrina broke the ex-USNS Upshur free of her moorings and settled her 500 feet across the Mobile River on the bank of a coal terminal. In 2008 she suffered further damage when Hurricane Ike hit the area, and the vessel bottomed out and sat at a ten‐degree list. According to Google Earth, the vessel was removed from Little Sand Island between May 2010 and July 2011.

USNS Upshur is associated with noted naval architect George G. Sharp and participated in several notable events in U.S. history, but, based on her current condition, MARAD has determined that she is not eligible for listing on the National Register of Historic Places.

Upshur was scrapped at Brownsville, Texas in 2011.
