= TS Empire State VI =

United States Navy training vessel

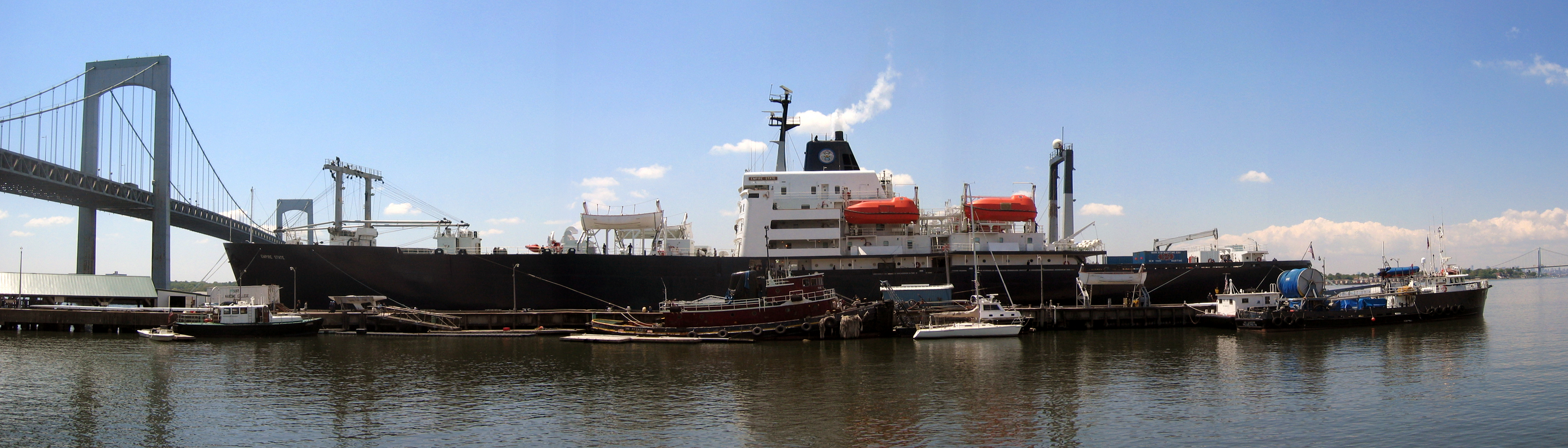
- Empire State VI

History

United States
- Name: TS Empire State VI
- Owner: Moore McCormack Lines (1977-83); United States Lines (1983-85); United States Maritime Administration (1985-2023)
- Operator: SUNY Maritime College
- Ordered: February 29, 1960
- Builder: Newport News Shipbuilding & Drydock Company, Newport News
- Yard number: 552
- Laid down: March 1, 1961
- Launched: September 16, 1961
- Acquired: April 19, 1962
- Out of service: 30 November 2022
- Stricken: 30 November 2022
- Home port: Fort Schuyler, The Bronx, New York City
- Identification: IMO number: 5264510; MMSI number: 366897000; Call Sign: KKFW
- Honors and awards: U.S. Maritime Administrator's Award of Merit
- Fate: Scrapped in Brownsville, Texas

General characteristics
- Class & type: Modified C4-S-1u commercial breakbulk freighter, Training ship/Troopship
- Tonnage: 14,557 grt; 14,620 dwt
- Length: 565 ft (172.2 m)
- Beam: 76 ft (23 m)
- Height: 137 ft 11.5 in (42.050 m) from keel to radar mast
- Draft: 25 ft (7.6 m)
- Propulsion: 2 × Foster Wheeler Type D steam boilers, steam turbines, single screw
- Speed: 18 knots (33 km/h; 21 mph)
- Complement: 791 (684 cadets, 107 officers/crew)
- Time to activate: 10 days

TS Empire State VI (T-AP-1001), callsign KKFW, IMO number 5264510, was a troop ship of the United States Navy and training ship of the United States Maritime Service.

== Construction and early years ==
Empire State VI was originally built for States Steamship Company in Newport News, Virginia by Newport News Shipbuilding & Drydock Company as a United States Maritime Administration Type C4-S-1u break bulk cargo freighter. She was delivered to the States Line on 19 April 1962 as the Oregon, a name she kept until the vessel was purchased on February 15, 1977, by Moore McCormack Lines who renamed the vessel Mormactide. She went to United States Lines in 1983 when USL purchased MML. Although not the last private owner of the vessel, Moore McCormack Lines was the last company to operate Empire State before being entered into government service, as USL only operated container ships.

== Government service ==
In 1986 the last private owner of the vessel, United States Lines, went bankrupt and turned over Mormactide to the United States Maritime Administration (MARAD). She was originally designated to be converted to an ammunition ship, USNS Cape Junction (T-AK-507?). Meanwhile, the vessel was laid up in the James River, National Defense Reserve Fleet, Fort Eustis, Virginia. In 1988, Mormactide was taken to Sturgeon Bay, Wisconsin, and underwent a conversion to a training ship at Bay Shipbuilding Company. After the conversion Mormactide was renamed Empire State VI. She was delivered to the State University of New York Maritime College at Fort Schuyler on New Year's Eve in 1989 to replace the older Empire State V.

In 1994, Empire State VI was activated by MARAD to support the withdrawal of American troops from Mogadishu, Somalia. In the 2005 aftermath of Hurricane Katrina and Hurricane Rita which devastated the Gulf Coast, MARAD again activated Empire State VI. The vessel provided housing and support for port workers and petroleum industry workers as they began repairs on strategic infrastructure and facilities in Louisiana.

In the fall of 2012, after Hurricane Sandy struck the New York/New Jersey area, the college offered the vessel to billet AmeriCorps - Federal Emergency Management Agency (FEMA) Corps and FEMA workers, from outside the region. SS Wright and TS Kennedy were also used to house FEMA workers, and between them the three ships housed 1,200 workers.

In September 2017, following the impact of Hurricane Harvey on the Gulf Coast of the United States, MARAD again activated the ship in order to provide support for FEMA's operations in Texas. However, after subsequent hurricanes made landfall in Florida and Puerto Rico the vessel was diverted to provide relief in the ports of Key West and San Juan, while in San Juan, the ship provided housing and meals to FEMA workers.

Empire State left the maritime college for the final time on 5 October 2022. She arrived at the port of Brownsville, Texas on 27 November 2022 and was stricken from the National Defense Reserve Fleet.

== Training voyage ==
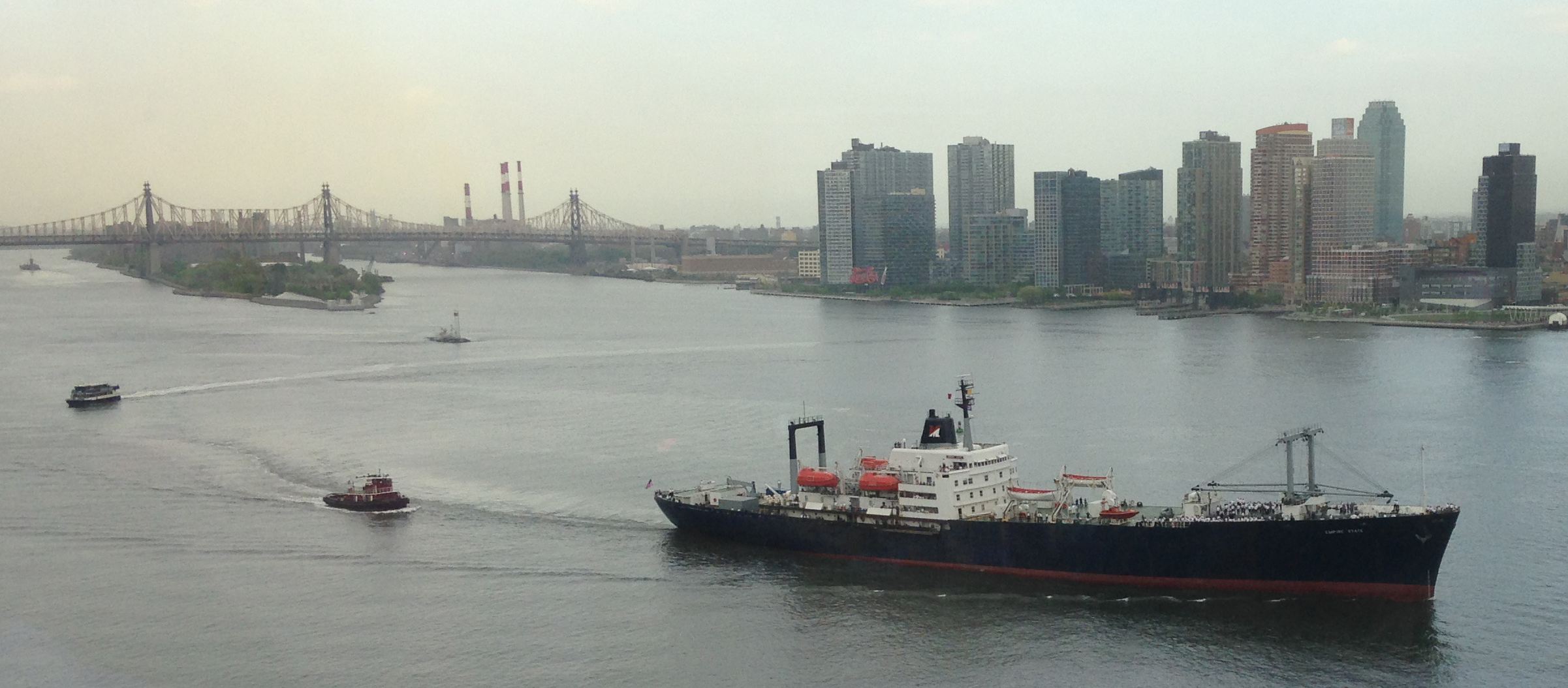
Empire State VI in May 2015

Each summer Empire State VI was activated for a 100-day training voyage. Students in the Regiment of Cadets operated the vessel for a summer sea term as part of their training requirements. The vessel's 2022 voyage, her last, ended on 2 August. The ship was retired after a 60-year service career.

The ship held the record as the longest serving power-driven vessel ever used by the school. While in very good condition given her age, she retained a steam power plant, despite diesel power having been the industry standard for decades. Her emissions also exceed international standards, and this affected her training itineraries. In 2015, a Congressional committee examined the cost of replacing the vessels of the six maritime academies where the average vessel age was 35 years, and Empire State was the oldest at 60 years. In March 2018, the US federal budget included funding to replace the aging training vessels with the National Security Multi-Mission Vessel design. The first of these new vessels, Empire State VII, was delivered to the SUNY's pier on 18 September 2023.
