= USNS Henry Gibbins =

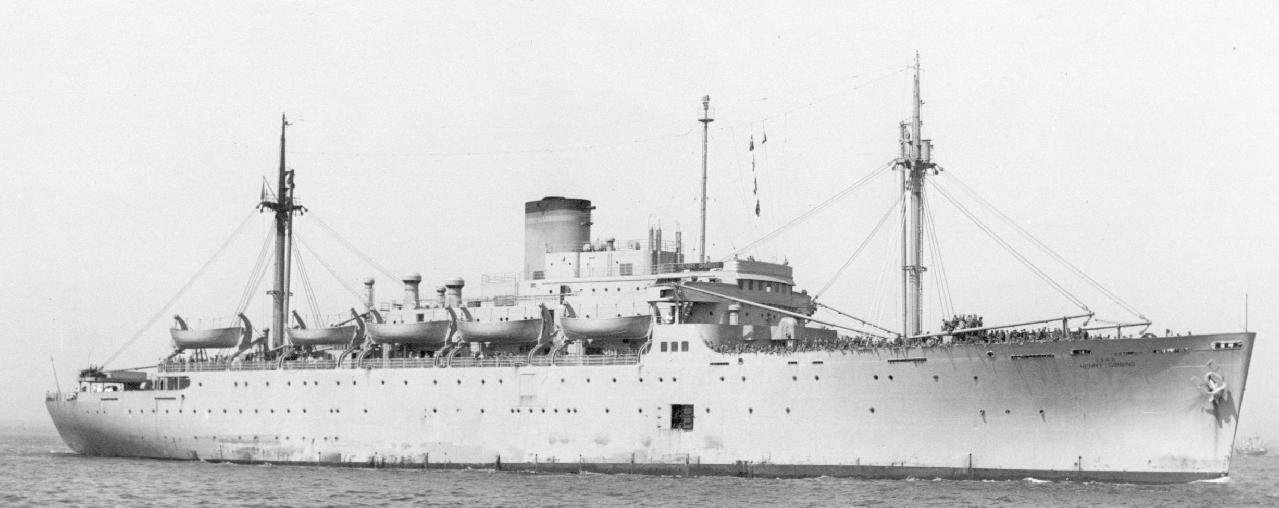
- USNS Henry Gibbins (T-AP-183), c. 1952

History

United States
- Name: USNS Henry Gibbins (T-AP-183)
- Namesake: US Army General Henry Gibbins
- Builder: Ingalls Shipbuilding
- Laid down: 23 August 1941
- Launched: 11 November 1942
- Sponsored by: Mrs H. I. Ingalls, Jr.
- Acquired: (By the Army): 27 February 1943
- In service: Army: 27 February 1943 - 1950; MSTS: 1 March 1950 - 1959; NYMA:1959 - 1973; Mass. MA: 1973 - 1978
- Renamed: Henry Gibbins (1943), Empire State IV (1959), Bay State (1973)
- Identification: MC hull type C3-1N P&C, MC hull no. 164; IMO number: 6506551
- Fate: Scrapped in 1983 after fire

General characteristics
- Displacement: 10,556 tons
- Length: 489 ft
- Beam: 70 ft
- Draft: 26 ft
- Installed power: 8,500 shp
- Propulsion: Turbine engines, single shaft
- Speed: 16.5 knots
- Troops: 1,976

USNS Henry Gibbins (T-AP-183) was a troop transport that served with the United States Military Sea Transportation Service (MSTS) during the 1950s. Prior to her MSTS service, she served as US Army transport USAT Henry Gibbins during World War II. She later served with the New York Maritime Academy as TS Empire State IV and with the Massachusetts Maritime Academy as USTS Bay State.

Henry Gibbins was one of four ships planned for the United States Lines North Atlantic service and ordered under Maritime Commission contract from the Ingalls Shipbuilding Company of Pascagoula, Mississippi with the allocated name of American Banker. Laid down on 23 August 1941; she was launched on 11 November 1942 as Biloxi. She was delivered to the Army Transportation Service 27 February 1943 as Henry Gibbins and served the Army as a troop transport during World War II.

== Refugee transport, WW-II ==
In accordance with President Franklin D. Roosevelt's 1944 executive order authorizing 1,000 refugees to enter the United States, 982 people boarded the ship, leaving Naples, Italy, on 21 July 1944, and making the trans-Atlantic crossing. Throughout the voyage, the Henry Gibbins was hunted by Nazi seaplanes and U-boats. The story was captured by Ruth Gruber, who played an instrumental part in the mission in her book Haven: The Dramatic Story of 1000 World War II Refugees and How They Came to America. The boat arrived in New York on 3 August 1944.

== Infantry transport, WW-II ==
On 27 August 1944, the Henry Gibbins sailed as part of a convoy of up to 100 ships from New York Harbor to Cherbourg. The troops on board were part of the 328th Infantry Regiment which was a subordinate unit of the 26th Infantry Division. The boat arrived at Cherbourg on 7 September 1944. The crossing on the Henry Gibbins was depicted in the graphic novel, The English GI: World War II Graphic Memoir, the story of Bernard Sandler.

== Post WW-II ==
Following the war, the Henry Gibbins was refitted as a "war brides ship", a baby passenger liner. Three decks of cabins, lounges, two formal staircases, a formal dining room and substantial plumbing upgrades were installed, and the Army operated her to transport American military personnel and their dependents on a route between Bremerhaven and the US East Coast until she was transferred to the U.S. Navy in 1950.

== Navy service ==
Henry Gibbins was acquired by the U.S. Navy from the U.S. Army on 1 March 1950, and assigned to the Military Sea Transportation Service. During the Korean War she transported men and equipment from New York City to the Caribbean and Canal Zone ports, prior to their assignment in the Pacific. In 1953, Henry Gibbins operated on the New York to Bremerhaven, Germany, and Southampton, England, runs, making a total of 12 cruises to these European ports.

From 1954 until late 1959 the veteran transport steamed from New York to the Caribbean over 75 times, sailed to the Mediterranean on 3 occasions and crossed the Atlantic to Northern Europe 8 times. During this time Henry Gibbins shuttled thousands of troops and tons of supplies between the United States and her foreign bases.

Henry Gibbins was transferred from MSTS to the United States Maritime Administration 2 December 1959, at Fort Schuyler, New York, for service with the New York Maritime College. The college named her TS Empire State IV and she retained that name until being transferred to the Massachusetts Maritime Academy in 1973. At that time she was renamed USTS Bay State.

During the winter of 1976–77, one of the coldest in fifty years, the Bay State suffered serious ice damage to her hull at her berth in Buzzards Bay at the southern end of the Cape Cod Canal. The hull plates were repaired and the ship continued to serve as a training vessel for two more years. In the summer of 1977 she carried cadets to Europe. In the summer of 1978 she made a training cruise to the Mediterranean.

The vessel was returned to the Maritime Administration after her final training cruise in 1978. Between the hull damage she had sustained in 1977, her age, and an increase in Massachusetts Maritime Academy's enrollment, she no longer suited the academy's requirements.

According to the U.S. Maritime Administration, the ship was scrapped in 1983 after suffering an engine room fire.
