= USNS Geiger =

US naval vessel (1952–1983)

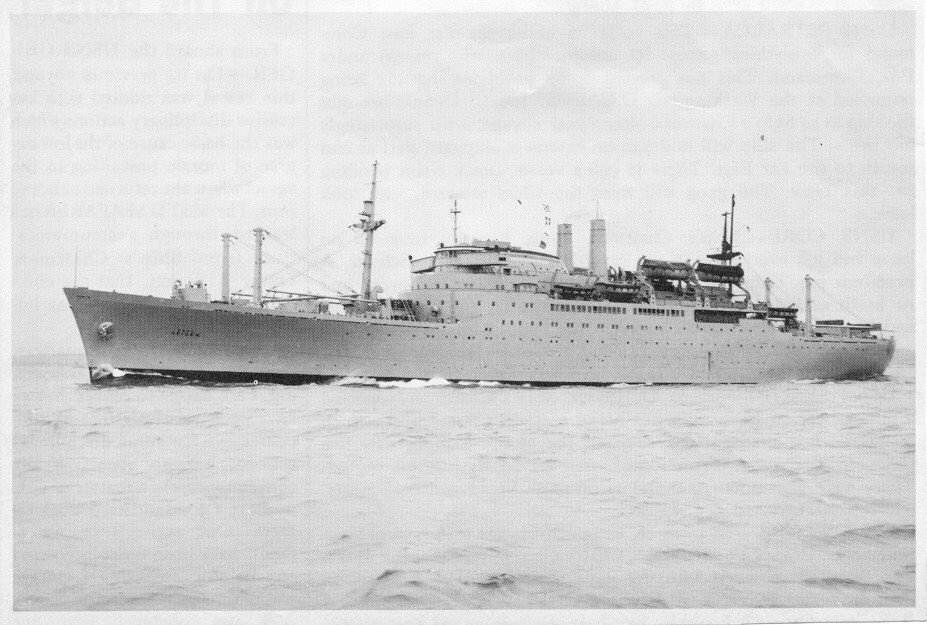
- USTS Bay State IV

History

United States
- Name: SS President Adams – 1 August 1949; USNS Geiger (T-AP-197) – 2 January 1951; TS Bay State (IV) – 1979-1981
- Namesake: U.S. President John Adams; General Roy Geiger; The Commonwealth of Massachusetts
- Builder: New York Shipbuilding Corp
- Laid down: 1 August 1949
- Launched: 9 October 1950
- Sponsored by: Mrs. Edward J. Hart
- Commissioned: 13 September 1952
- Stricken: 1 April 1983
- Identification: IMO number: 7945596
- Fate: Destroyed by fire December 1981

General characteristics
- Class & type: Barrett transport; type P2-S1-DN3
- Displacement: 11,225 long tons (11,405 t)
- Length: 533 ft 9 in (162.69 m)
- Beam: 73 ft 3 in (22.33 m)
- Draft: 27 ft 1 in (8.26 m)
- Propulsion: Steam turbine, single shaft, 13,750 shp (10,250 kW)
- Speed: 19 kn (35 km/h; 22 mph)
- Troops: 382 Cabin, 1470 troops
- Complement: 192
- Armament: None

USNS Geiger (T-AP-197)/USTS Bay State IV was a transport ship in the United States Navy. She was named after General Roy Geiger, who, from July 1945 to November 1946, commanded Marine Force, Pacific Fleet.

== Career ==
Geiger was laid down as President Adams on 1 August 1949 under Maritime Commission contract for American President Lines by the New York Shipbuilding Corporation of Camden, New Jersey; launched on 9 October 1950; sponsored by Mrs. Edward J. Hart, wife of Congressman Hart of New Jersey; renamed Geiger on 2 January 1951, while under conversion for MSTS; acquired by the Navy 13 September 1952; and placed in service the same day.

Acquired for transport service during the Korean War, Geiger operated under MSTS from 1952. Over the years she made numerous runs in support of peace-keeping operations throughout the world. She crossed the Atlantic dozens of times, deploying troops to European bases and returning troops and refugees to the United States.

Operating out of New York, Geiger provided support for the 6th Fleet on station in the Middle East. In response to the pro-Soviet takeover of the Syrian Army in August 1957, she steamed in the Mediterranean while the 6th Fleet deployed to protect independent nations in the Middle East, including the pro-Western government of King Hussein in Jordan. In July 1958 she carried troops from European bases to Lebanon to thwart an attempted Communist coup against the government of President Chamoun.

Between 1959 and 1965 Geiger continued operations out of New York, steaming to Bremerhaven, Germany and Southampton, England; Mediterranean ports in North Africa, Italy, Greece, and Turkey; and American bases in the Caribbean. Following the Cuban Missile Crisis, she made three runs between New York and Cuba to return military dependents to Guantanamo Bay Naval Base during December 1962 and January 1963. Between 6 October and 23 November 1964, she participated in the amphibious exercise, Operation "Steel Pike I", the largest peacetime amphibious exercise ever conducted in the Atlantic. She supported the movement of combat-ready troops from the United States to the southwest coast of Spain and took part in the largest American military landing operation since the Korean War.

After returning to Charleston, South Carolina, 23 November with 768 marines embarked, she resumed transport runs between New York and Bremerhaven. Arriving New York, 1 June 1965, she departed the next day for the Caribbean, where from 6 to 17 June she operated off Santo Domingo to support naval forces engaged in ending civil war in the Dominican Republic.

Following two more runs to Bremerhaven, Geiger departed New York 16 August for the Pacific. Steaming via Pearl Harbor, she arrived Qui Nhon, South Vietnam, 19 September to bolster the Navy's transportation capabilities during the struggle to halt Communist aggression in Southeast Asia. Between 23 September and 1 October she sailed via Yokohama, Japan, to Pusan, South Korea, where she embarked Republic of Korea troops bound for Vietnam. She returned to Qui Nhon 8 October; steamed to Cam Ranh Bay the 9th; then departed the next day for the United States, arriving San Francisco 27 October. Sailing for the Far East 5 November, she reached Qui Nhon the 23d and resumed duty as a troop transport. Between 30 November and 13 December she rotated ROK troops from Vung Tau, South Vietnam, to Inchon and back.

She departed Vietnam for the United States 13 December; and, steaming via Pearl Harbor and the Panama Canal, she arrived New York 13 January 1966. Geiger resumed transatlantic service to Bremerhaven 1 February, and during the next 6 months made six runs between the United States and Europe. Departing Bremerhaven 8 August, she steamed via the Panama Canal and San Francisco to resume troop-carrying duty in the Far East. During 1967 Geiger shuttled between San Francisco and Vietnam carrying U.S. troops to bolster Allied forces fighting in the Vietnam War.

== USTS Bay State IV ==
In 1979 she was reassigned to the Massachusetts Maritime Academy as the United States Training Ship (USTS) Bay State IV. In December 1981 she suffered an engine room fire. Declared a constructive loss, she was returned to the Maritime Administration for disposition.
