= Maine Maritime Academy =

Public college in Castine, Maine, United States

- Motto: Dirigo (Latin)
- Motto in English: I direct
- Type: Public university
- Established: March 21, 1941; 85 years ago
- Academic affiliations: Space-grant
- Endowment: $18.1 million
- President: RADM Craig Johnson, USMS
- Undergraduates: 979 students
- Location: Castine, Maine, United States; 44°23.3′N 68°48.2′W
- Campus: 35 acres (14 ha)
- Commandant: CAPT Justin Cooper, USN (ret), USMS
- Colors: Dark Blue; Gold; Light Blue
- Nickname: Mariners
- Sporting affiliations: NCAA Division III – NAC; NEWMAC; NEISA
- Website: mainemaritime.edu

Maine Maritime Academy (Maine Maritime or MMA) is a public college focused on maritime training and located in Castine, Maine. Established by the 90th Maine Legislature on March 21, 1941, the academy is one of six non-federal maritime training colleges in the United States and one of only two that fields a Naval Reserve Officers Training Corps (NROTC) unit. Unlike federal service academies, no congressional recommendation is required for admission to this state institution.

The academy serves approximately 979 undergraduate students who pursue degrees in maritime-related fields including engineering, business and logistics, marine sciences, and marine transportation. Graduates are not obligated to pursue sea-going or military careers after graduation, with many choosing shore-side employment in maritime-related industries or the power generation sector. The college is accredited by the New England Commission of Higher Education.

== History ==
=== Founding and early years (1941–1945) ===
An institution devoted to nautical training in Maine was first proposed in the 1930s by educational and civic leaders throughout the state, led by Senator Ralph Leavitt of Portland. Through efforts of Senator Ralph A. Leavitt and the Portland Propeller Club seeking to establish an institution of nautical science, the Maine Legislature made an appropriation of $15,000 in March 1941. The Maine Maritime Academy was formally established by an act of the 90th Maine Legislature on March 21, 1941.

The original class of 29 students, known as the "Solid 28," reported on October 9, 1941, to Rear Admiral Douglas Dismukes, USN, a veteran of World War I who came out of retirement to head the fledgling school. Classes initially met on the campus of the Eastern State Normal School, with students lodged at Castine's Pentagöet Inn, until the Legislature transferred the Normal School building to MMA property on January 23, 1942. The Mattie, a schooner out of Camden, Maine, served as the first training ship.

=== World War II service ===
The academy's founding coincided with America's entry into World War II, creating an urgent national need for trained maritime officers. World War II required a rapid build-up of the U.S. Merchant Marine, with a critical need for trained deck and engineering officers. The Academy met that challenge, graduating its first class in May 1943 after a truncated course of studies.

By war's end, Maine Maritime had graduated 384 men who served at sea during the war in every theater of operations. These graduates were commissioned as officers in the Merchant Marine and U.S. Naval Reserve, many immediately entering active duty or serving aboard merchant vessels in support of the ongoing war effort under wartime conditions where merchant mariners died at a rate of 1 in 26, which equated to the highest casualty rate of any military service. A World War II memorial at the academy reads "The seas washed over them and they were gone. 6,895 Merchant Mariners, 60 from the State of Maine, and 1,810 members of the U.S. Naval Armed Guard lost their lives in WW II. We shall not forget them."

=== Post-War expansion and development ===
In the post-war era, the program expanded from the original concept to a three-year course of study, and in 1960, to a four-year, Bachelor of Science degree program.

In the 1960s and 70s, Rear Admiral Edward Rodgers, USMS, led a multi-million dollar development program culminating in full membership in the New England Association of Schools and Colleges. Rodgers, a 1940 U.S. Naval Academy graduate and World War II naval aviator, served as superintendent from 1964 to 1984, transforming the academy through comprehensive modernization and academic expansion. During his tenure, Rodgers received both a BA and MA of Science in aviation engineering at MIT and helped test the Navy's Skyhook personnel rescue project before transitioning to his academic leadership role at MMA.

=== Breaking barriers and modern era ===
In 1976, Academy senior Deborah Doane Dempsey became the first woman to graduate from any maritime or service academy in the United States, graduating as valedictorian of her class. She later became the first American woman to achieve the rank of Master Mariner and command a cargo ship sailing internationally, and was the first woman to become a regular member of the Council of American Master Mariners. Dempsey served during the Persian Gulf War and received the U.S. Navy Meritorious Service Award for Public Service, and in 1994 received an honorary doctorate from Maine Maritime Academy.

The academy has continued to evolve in the modern era, expanding its academic offerings beyond traditional maritime programs to include engineering technology, international business and logistics, and marine sciences, while maintaining its core mission of preparing students for careers in the maritime industry and related fields. Today, Maine Maritime Academy stands as one of six state maritime academies in the United States, distinguished by its comprehensive maritime education programs and strong traditions rooted in its wartime origins.

== Academics ==
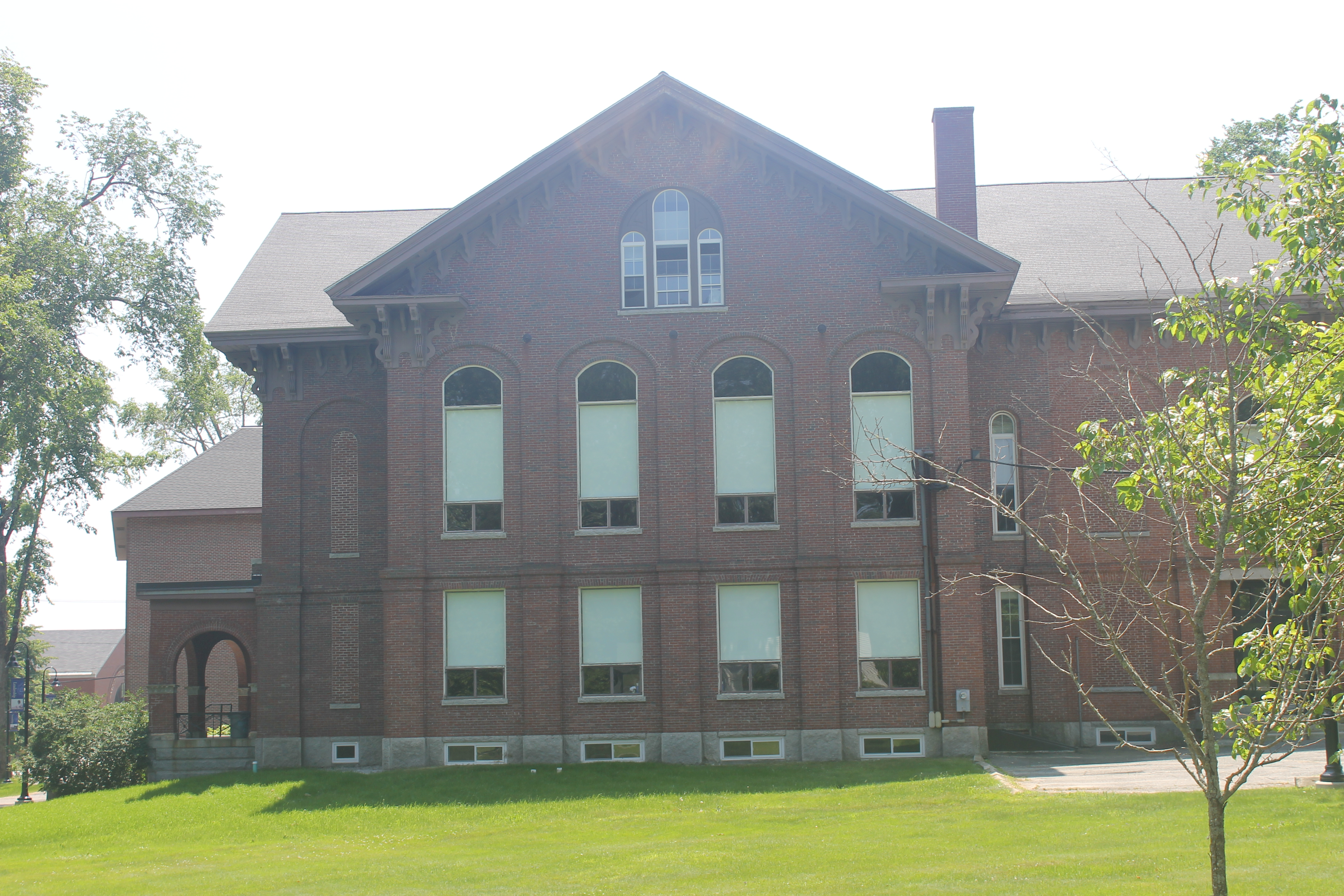
Dismukes Hall

Undergraduate demographics as of Fall 2023
Race and ethnicity	Total
White	83%
Hispanic	5%
Unknown	5%
Black	3%
Two or more races	2%
American Indian/Alaska Native	1%
Asian	1%
International student	1%
Economic diversity
Low-income (Note: The percentage of students who received an income-based federal Pell grant intended for low-income students.)	26%
Affluent (Note: The percentage of students who are a part of the American middle class at the bare minimum.)	74%

Maine Maritime Academy is a career-oriented college recognized for providing rigorous and practical maritime, engineering, engineering technology, marine science, and logistics education. The academy serves approximately 950 undergraduate students across its specialized programs and maintains a 90% job placement rate within 90 days of graduation.

The academy offers undergraduate bachelor's and master's degrees through five schools:

- The Harold Alfond School of Engineering
- The Thompson School of Marine Transportation
- The Loeb-Sullivan School of International Business & Logistics
- The Corning School of Ocean Studies
- Arts and Sciences

The academy is accredited by the New England Commission of Higher Education and maintains specialized accreditation from the Accreditation Board for Engineering and Technology for its engineering programs.

=== Degree programs ===
The academy offers both associate and bachelor's degree programs. The most popular undergraduate majors include Marine Science/Merchant Marine Officer, Power Plant Technology/Technician, Naval Architecture and Marine Engineering, International Business/Trade/Commerce, Marine Biology and Biological Oceanography, and Systems Engineering.

The academy also offers unique collaborative programs, including Associate of Science degrees in Small Craft Design and Small Craft Systems offered jointly with The Landing School of Boatbuilding and Design in Kennebunkport, Maine, and an Associate of Science degree program offered in conjunction with Bath Iron Works for shipyard apprentices.

Graduate-level programs are offered through the Loeb-Sullivan School of International Business and Logistics, providing Master of Science degrees in international logistics management and maritime management.

=== U.S. Coast Guard licensing programs ===
Maine Maritime Academy is one of six state maritime academies in the United States authorized to prepare students for unlimited U.S. Coast Guard merchant marine licenses. Students in Marine Transportation Operations, Marine Systems Engineering (License Track), Marine Engineering Technology, and Marine Engineering Operations are required to participate in the Regiment of Midshipmen to meet federal requirements for unlimited licensing.

=== Naval Reserve Officers Training Corps (NROTC) ===
Maine Maritime Academy is one of only two maritime academies in the United States that fields a Naval Reserve Officers Training Corps (NROTC) unit. The NROTC unit at Maine Maritime Academy was established in 1972 and is composed of two units: NROTC Maine Maritime Academy and NROTC University of Maine, Orono, together commissioning hundreds of Navy, Marine Corps, and Strategic Sealift officers.

=== Regiment of Midshipmen ===
Student at Maine Maritime Academy choose between participating in the Regiment of Midshipmen or pursuing a traditional college lifestyle. The Regiment of Midshipmen is a leadership program with a disciplined lifestyle designed to develop honor, integrity, discipline, and camaraderie.

Students pursuing unlimited U.S. Coast Guard licenses are required to participate in the Regiment, while participation is optional for all other majors. Approximately 10% of the Regiment consists of non-unlimited license majors, and all leadership opportunities are available to them. The Regiment operates under core values of honor, loyalty, and devotion to duty, with members wearing military-style uniforms and participating in a structured four-year progression from fourth-class through first-class midshipman rank.

Despite the military-style structure, Maine Maritime Academy is not a military academy and there is no military obligation after graduation. Traditional and regimental students live in the same residence halls, attend the same classes, and are eligible to participate in all campus clubs, activities, and athletics.

=== Cooperative education ===
Maine Maritime Academy maintains comprehensive cooperative education and internship programs that are integral to student education. Students from all engineering majors and the Marine Transportation Operations major are required to complete at least one cooperative work experience, with some majors requiring multiple placements.

=== Sea-going training ===
Students in the Regiment of Midshipmen participate in training cruises aboard the Training Ship State of Maine (TSSOM), while students in the Small Vessel Operations program have the opportunity to sail with the historic schooner Bowdoin during annual training voyages. During the summer after sophomore year, students pursuing unlimited Coast Guard licenses are assigned to merchant ships as cadets to deepen understanding of shipboard procedures through the cadet shipping program.

=== Rankings ===
The academy was ranked #7 in "Regional Colleges North" in the 2025 U.S. News Best Colleges rankings.

== Training ships ==
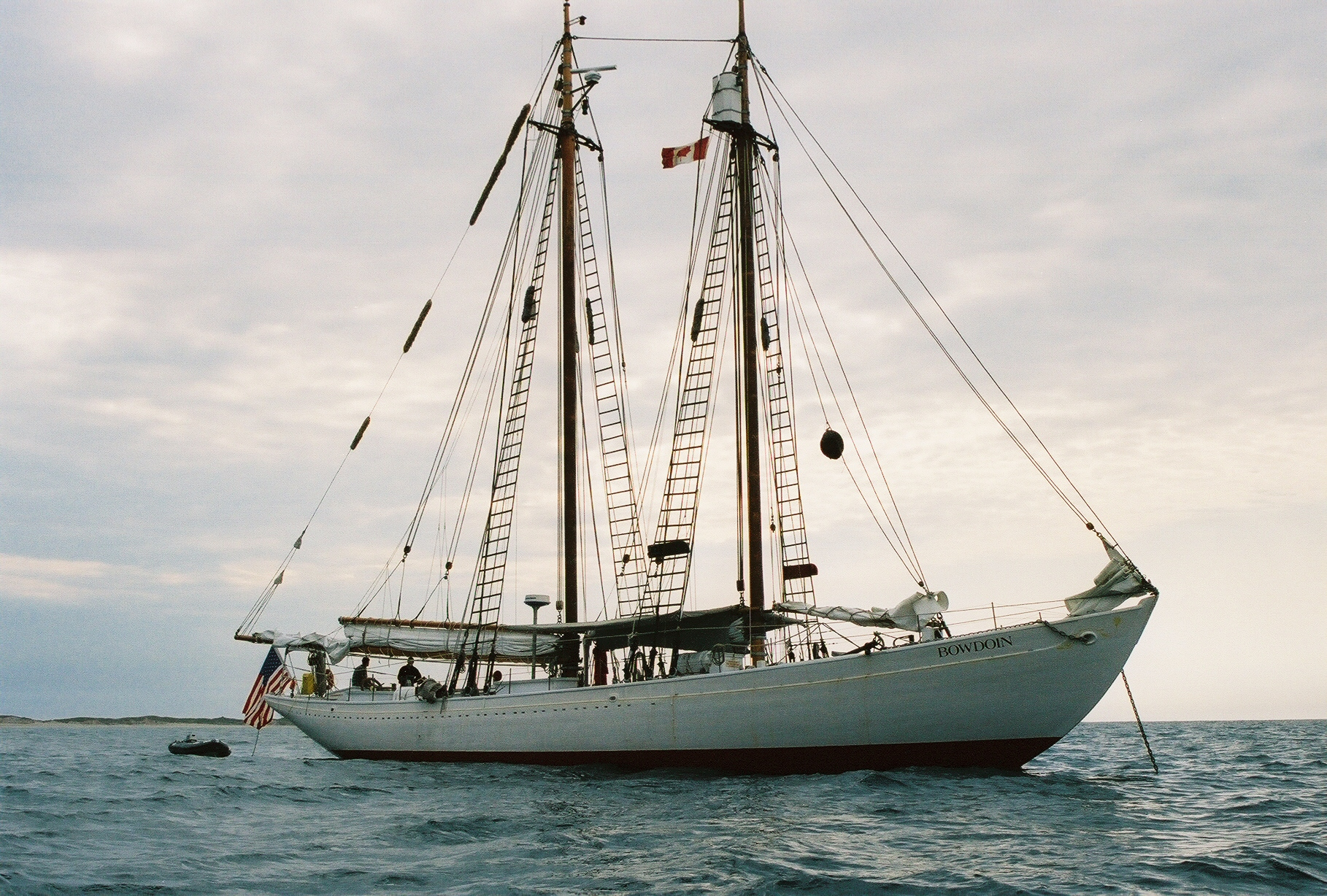
Schooner Bowdoin

Maine Maritime Academy has operated a series of training vessels throughout its history to provide hands-on maritime education and practical sea-going experience for students. Each training ship has carried the designation TS State of Maine during its service period, typically utilizing former U.S. Navy vessels converted for educational purposes.

Training ships at the academy have included:

- USS Comfort (AH-6) - 1953–1963
- USS Ancon (AGC-4) - 1963–1973
- USNS Upshur (T-AP-198) - 1973–1995
- USNS Tanner (T-AGS-40) - 6 June 1997 – 2024
- TS State of Maine

== Athletics ==
Maine Maritime athletic teams compete as the Mariners in the Division III level of the National Collegiate Athletic Association (NCAA). The academy primarily competes in the North Atlantic Conference (NAC) for most sports since the 1996–97 academic year, with football competing in the New England Women's and Men's Athletic Conference (NEWMAC) and sailing teams participating at the Division I level in the New England Intercollegiate Sailing Association (NEISA).

The academy sponsors 15 intercollegiate varsity sports programs. Men's athletics include basketball, cross country, football, golf, lacrosse, sailing, soccer, and swimming & diving, while women compete in basketball, cross country, lacrosse, sailing, soccer, swimming & diving, and volleyball. Additional club sports offerings include wrestling for both men and women, as well as marksmanship programs featuring precision air rifle and competitive trap shooting.

The football program faced suspension on August 14, 2020, due to COVID-19-related financial constraints. Following a successful fundraising campaign, the academy announced on January 9, 2023, that football would return as a varsity program beginning with the 2025 season, with the team joining the Commonwealth Coast Conference.

== Notable alumni ==
Notable alumni include Kenneth M. Curtis, Chris Caiazzo, Deborah Doane Dempsey, and Thomas K. Shannon.
