= Trout (disambiguation) =

Trout is the common name given to a number of species of freshwater fish.

Trout may also refer to:

== People ==
- Keeper Trout, a psychedelic alkaloid and plant researcher
- Mike Trout, a professional baseball player

== Places ==
- Trout Beck, a river in the Lake District, England
- Trout Creek (disambiguation)
- Trout Island, Graham Land, Antarctica
- Trout Lake (disambiguation)
- Trout River (disambiguation)
- Trout Run (disambiguation)

=== United States ===
- Trout, Kentucky, an unincorporated community
- Trout, Louisiana, an unincorporated community
- Trout Island, Charlevoix County, Michigan
- Trout, West Virginia, an unincorporated community
- Trout Pond, West Virginia

== Music ==
- Trout Records, the record label for Trout Fishing in America
- Trout Quintet, a piano quintet based on the song by Franz Schubert
- "Die Forelle" or "The Trout", a lied by Franz Schubert
- "Trout", a song by Neneh Cherry from the album Homebrew

== Films ==
- Las truchas (Trouts), a 1978 Spanish film
- The Trout (film), a 1982 French film

== Other uses ==
- Trout (surname), a list of people and fictional and mythological characters
- USS Trout, two US Navy submarines
- The Trout Inn (disambiguation)
