= Trout Brook =

Trout Brook may refer to:

- Massachusetts
  - Trout Brook (Massachusetts), a stream in Holden, Massachusetts
- Minnesota
  - Trout Brook (Ramsey County, Minnesota), a stream in Ramsey County, Minnesota
  - Trout Brook (Dakota County, Minnesota), a stream in Dakota County, Minnesota
  - Trout Brook (Washington County, Minnesota), a stream in Washington County, Minnesota
- New York
  - Trout Brook (East Branch Delaware River), a stream in Delaware County, New York
  - Trout Brook (Beaver Kill), a stream in Delaware County, New York
  - Trout Brook (Otsego Lake tributary), a stream in Otsego County, New York
  - Trout Brook (Schroon River tributary), a stream in Warren County, New York
- Nova Scotia
  - Trout Brook, Nova Scotia, a community in Nova Scotia
- Pennsylvania
  - Trout Brook (South Branch Tunkhannock Creek), in Lackawanna County and Wyoming County, Pennsylvania
  - Trout Brook (Toby Creek), in Luzerne County, Pennsylvania
- Vermont
  - Trout River (Vermont), a tributary of the Missisquoi River
- Wyoming
  - Trout Brook (South Branch Tunkhannock Creek), a stream in Lackawanna County, Wyoming

== See also ==
- Trout Creek (disambiguation)
- Trout Run (disambiguation)
