= John M. B. Clitz =

United States Navy admiral (1821–1897)

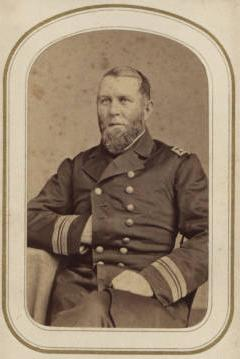
- John M. B. Clitz, photographed as a lieutenant commander ca. the 1860s.
- Born: 1 December 1821; Sackets Harbor, New York, US
- Died: 9 October 1897 (aged 75); Washington, D.C., US
- Burial place: Arlington National Cemetery
- Relatives: Henry B. Clitz (brother)
- Military career
- Allegiance: United States
- Branch: United States Navy
- Service years: 1837–1883
- Rank: Rear Admiral
- Commands: USS Penobscot; USS Juniata; USS Osceola; USS Pawnee; USS California; Naval Station Port Royal; Asiatic Squadron
- Conflicts: Mexican War; Siege of Veracruz; First Battle of Tuxpan; American Civil War; Union blockade; First Battle of Fort Fisher; Second Battle of Fort Fisher

Rear Admiral John Mellen Brady Clitz (1 December 1821 – 9 October 1897) was an officer in the United States Navy. During his long naval career, he fought in both the Mexican War and the American Civil War and rose to command of the Asiatic Squadron.

== Naval career ==
Clitz was born in Sackets Harbor, New York, on 1 December 1821. His father was a U.S. Army officer and veteran of the War of 1812 who was reassigned to Michigan and accompanied there by his family. Clitz was appointed as a midshipman on 12 April 1837, and soon was attached to the sloop-of-war USS Ontario in the West Indies Squadron, serving aboard her from 1838 to 1842. He then studied at the Philadelphia Naval School in Philadelphia, Pennsylvania, in 1843 and, having completed his training as a midshipman, was promoted to passed midshipman on 29 June 1843.

Clitz's next assignment was to the new sloop-of-war USS St. Mary's in the Mediterranean Squadron from 1844 to 1845, after which he served aboard the sloop-of-war USS Falmouth in the Home Squadron from 1845 to 1846.

After the outbreak of the Mexican War, Clitz transferred to the bomb brig USS Hecla in 1847, a ship purchased in 1846 and commissioned in 1847 for service in that conflict as part of the Home Squadron. Aboard Hecla, Clitz arrived in Mexican waters at Isla de Sacrificios off Veracruz on the morning of 29 March 1847 and participated in the final day of the siege of the city before it ended with the surrender of the Castle of San Juan de Ulúa to American forces that evening. Hecla then began patrols in the Gulf of Mexico, during which she took part in the American amphibious seizure of Tuxpan in April 1847. Later in 1847, Clitz transferred to the screw steamer USS Petrita – also in the Home Squadron but immobilized in Mexican waters due to mechanical problems – until 1848.

After the Mexican War, Clitz served aboard the sailing frigate USS Cumberland in the Mediterranean Squadron from 1849 to 1851, being promoted to master while aboard her on 16 August 1850. Promoted to lieutenant on 6 April 1851, he had duty with the United States Coast Survey from 1851 to 1852, then was aboard the steam paddle frigate USS Mississippi in the East India Squadron from 1852 to 1855. After special duty in Washington, D.C., in 1856, he was aboard the sloop-of-war USS Decatur in the Pacific Squadron from 1858 to 1859 and then aboard the steam sloop-of-war USS Iroquois in 1861.

The American Civil War broke out in April 1861, and Clitz served extensively in operations related to the Union blockade of the Confederate States of America. Promoted to commander on 16 July 1862, he was the commanding officer of the steam gunboat USS Penobscot in the North Atlantic Blockading Squadron in 1863 and later that year of the steam sloop-of-war USS Juniata in the East Gulf Blockading Squadron. He commanded the new sidewheel gunboat USS Osceola in the North Atlantic Blockading Squadron from 1864 to 1865 and led her in both the First Battle of Fort Fisher in December 1864 and the Second Battle of Fort Fisher in January 1865, both of them attacks against Fort Fisher, one of the fortifications guarding Wilmington, North Carolina. In a dispatch of 28 January 1865, Rear Admiral David Dixon Porter commended him for his actions at Fort Fisher and recommended him for promotion.

After the Civil War, Clitz reported for duty in 1866 at the Boston Navy Yard in Charlestown, Massachusetts, and was promoted to captain on 25 July 1866. He commanded the steam sloop-of-war USS Pawnee in the South Atlantic Squadron from 1868 to 1869 before performing ordnance duty at the New York Navy Yard in Brooklyn, New York, in 1870. He then commanded the steam frigate USS California in the Pacific Squadron from 1870 to 1872.

Promoted to commodore on 28 December 1872, Clitz commanded Naval Station Port Royal in Port Royal, South Carolina, from 1876 to 1877 and was a lighthouse inspector from 1878 to 1880.

Promoted to rear admiral on 13 March 1880, Clitz was commander-in-chief of the Asiatic Squadron from 11 September 1880 to 21 April 1883.

Scheduled to retire from the Navy upon reaching the mandatory retirement age of 62 on 1 December 1883, Clitz applied to retire earlier, and did so on 16 October 1883.

== Personal life ==
Clitz was the son of John Clitz and his wife Mary Gale Mellen. He had four sisters and three brothers. One of his brothers was U.S. Army officer Henry B. Clitz. His sisters all married U.S. Army officers. Sarah married Robert H. Anderson, who resigned his commission to become a brigadier general in the Confederate States Army. Frances married Gustavus A. De Russy.

Clitz married the former Mary L. Bohrer (1823–1894) on 21 November 1843. They had three children.

== Retirement and death ==
In retirement, Clitz resided in Brooklyn, New York. He died at St. Elizabeths Asylum in Washington, D.C., on 9 October 1897. Clitz was buried at Arlington National Cemetery, Arlington, Virginia.

== Notes ==
Military offices
Preceded by Thomas H. Patterson	Commander, Asiatic Squadron; 11 September 1880–21 April 1883	Succeeded by Peirce Crosby
