= Trout (surname) =

Trout is a surname. Notable people with the surname include:

== People ==
- Austin Trout (born 1985), American boxer, WBA super welterweight champion
- Bobbi Trout (1906–2003), American female pioneering aviator
- Charles H. Trout (1935–2006), American historian and college president
- Dink Trout (1898–1950), American actor and radio personality
- Dizzy Trout (1915–1972), American Major League Baseball pitcher
- G. Malcolm Trout (1896–1990), Food science professor, Michigan State University
- Grace Wilbur Trout (1864–1955), American suffragist
- Harry E. Trout (1876–1941), head college football coach for the West Virginia University Mountaineers
- Harry L. Trout, Mayor of Lancaster, Pennsylvania (1915–1920)
- J. D. Trout (born 1959), American philosopher and cognitive scientist
- Jack Trout (1935–2017), American advertising and marketing theorist, a founder and pioneer of positioning theory
- James M. Trout (1850–1910), United States Navy sailor and recipient of the Medal of Honor
- Jennie Kidd Trout (1841–1921), first female licensed physician in Canada
- Jessie Trout (1895–1990), Canadian missionary in Japan
- Michael Trout (Australian politician) (born 1963), member of the Legislative Assembly of Queensland
- Michael Carver Trout (1810–1873), U.S. Representative from Pennsylvania
- Mike Trout (born 1991), American Major League Baseball player
- Monroe Trout (born 1962), formerly American, hedge fund manager
- Nelson Wesley Trout (1921–1996), first African-American bishop in the Evangelical Lutheran Church in America
- Robert Trout (1909–2000), American journalist
- Ryan Trout (born 1978), American soccer player
- Steve Trout (born 1957), American Major League Baseball pitcher, son of Dizzy Trout
- Walter Trout (born 1951), American blues musician

== Fictional or mythological characters ==
- the title character of the 1968 novel Eva Trout by Elizabeth Bowen
- Ketil Trout (disambiguation), several figures in Norse folklore
- Kilgore Trout, created by writer Kurt Vonnegut
