= List of shipwrecks in March 1848 =

The list of shipwrecks in March 1848 includes ships sunk, foundered, wrecked, grounded, or otherwise lost during March 1848.

== 1 March ==
List of shipwrecks: 1 March 1848
Ship	State	Description
Chanticleer	United Kingdom	The schooner was wrecked at Port Frances, Cape Colony, at the mouth of the Kowie River. Her crew were rescued.
Christina Amalia	France	The ship was wrecked on the Jadder, in the North Sea. Her crew were rescued. She was on a voyage from Saint-Valery-sur-Somme, Somme, France to Bergen, Norway.
Rapid	United Kingdom	The ship was driven ashore and damaged at Marseille, Bouches-du-Rhône, France. She was on a voyage from Newport, Monmouthshire to Marseille. She was refloated and taken in to Marseille.

== 2 March ==
List of shipwrecks: 2 March 1848
Ship	State	Description
Broomielaw	United Kingdom	The schooner was driven ashore near Southport, Lancashire. She was on a voyage from Sligo to Liverpool, Lancashire.
Elizabeth and Mary	United Kingdom	The ship was driven ashore and damaged at Kingsgate, Kent. Her crew were rescued. She was on a voyage from Leith, Lothian to the Charente. She was refloated on 6 March and taken in to Margate, Kent.
Kingston	United Kingdom	The ship ran aground on the Burbo Bank, in Liverpool Bay. She was on a voyage from Liverpool to Dublin. She was refloated and resumed her voyage.
Lord Melbourne	United Kingdom	The sloop was driven ashore at the mouth of the River Eden. She was on a voyage from an Irish port to Dundee, Forfarshire. She was refloated on 4 March and taken in to Dundee.
Maria	Spain	The ship ran aground on the English Bank, off the coast of Uruguay. She was on a voyage from Cádiz to Montevideo, Uruguay. HMS Harpy (Royal Navy) was sent to her assistance.
Mary	United Kingdom	The barque was wrecked at the Tower of San Miguel, 4 leagues (12 nautical miles (22 km) east of Almería, Spain with the loss of one of her sixteen crew. She was on a voyage from Newcastle upon Tyne, Northumberland to Garrucha, Spain.
Orwell	(United Kingdom of Great Britain and Ireland) New South Wales	The barque was wrecked at the entrance to Manukau Harbour, New Zealand, when she broadsided a shoal. She was en route from Twofold Bay to Auckland, carrying livestock.
Sutors	United Kingdom	The ship ran aground on the Gunfleet Sand, in the North Sea off the coast of Essex. Her crew were rescued. She was on a voyage from Newcastle upon Tyne, Northumberland to Fécamp, Seine-Inférieure, France. She was later refloated.
Waterloo	United Kingdom	The ship was wrecked at Kinsale, County Cork. She was on a voyage from Cork to Bantry.

== 3 March ==
List of shipwrecks: 3 March 1848
Ship	State	Description
Boussole	French Navy	The Ariane-class corvette was wrecked on Klein Curaçao, Curaçao and Dependencies. Her crew were rescued. She was on a voyage from Porto Caballo, Venezuela to Port-au-Prince, Haiti.
Chieftain	United Kingdom	The ship was abandoned off the Tuskar Rock. Her crew were rescued. She was on a voyage from Liverpool, Lancashire to Africa. Subsequently sighted on fire 7 nautical miles (13 km) east by south of the Tuskar Rock.
Donegal	United Kingdom	The ship was wrecked near Calais, France. Her crew were rescued. She was on a voyage from Hartlepool, County Durham to Margate, Kent.
Emma	United Kingdom	The ship ran aground on the Margate Sand, off the coast of Kent. She was on a voyage from London to Sydney, New South Wales. She was refloated.
Laborieux	France	The ship was driven ashore and wrecked 70 nautical miles (130 km) north of Madras, India. Her crew were rescued.
Lady Bagot	United Kingdom	The ship was abandoned in the Atlantic Ocean. Her crew were rescued by Oregon (United States). Lady Bagot was on a voyage from Savannah, Georgia, United States to New Ross, County Wexford.
Mary	United Kingdom	The ship was driven ashore and wrecked on the Gata Cape, Spain with the loss of three of her twenty crew. She was on a voyage from Newcastle upon Tyne, Northumberland to Garrucha, Spain.
Prince of Orange	United Kingdom	The schooner ran aground on the Dutchman's Bank, in the Irish Sea and sank. Her crew were rescued. She was on a voyage from Bangor, Caernarfonshire to Maldon, Essex. She was refloated on 4 April and taken in to Bangor.
San Mitrofan	Russia	The brig sank in the Danube 4 nautical miles (7.4 km) downstream of Galaţi, Ottoman Empire. She was on a voyage from Galaţi to Constantinople.
San Spiridone	Ottoman Empire	The ship was driven ashore in the Danube 4 nautical miles (7.4 km) downstream of Galaţi. She was on a voyage from Galaţi to Marseille, Bouches-du-Rhône, France.
Tropeta	Kingdom of the Two Sicilies	The ship foundered off the coast of Finistère, France. Her crew were. She was on a voyage from Naples to Palermo and Hull, Yorkshire, United Kingdom. The wreck came ashore at Aberac'h, Finistère on 6 March.

== 4 March ==
List of shipwrecks: 4 March 1848
Ship	State	Description
Airey	United Kingdom	The ship was abandoned in the Atlantic Ocean. Her crew were rescued by Hesperus (United Kingdom). Airey was on a voyage from Callao Peru to Liverpool, Lancashire.
Five Sisters	United Kingdom	The ship was driven ashore and wrecked in La Perelle Bay, Guernsey, Channel Islands with the loss of all nine crew. She was on a voyage from Lisbon, Portugal to Wick, Caithness.
Ino	(United Kingdom of Great Britain and Ireland) British North America	The brig was driven ashore and wrecked at "Blanc-Sablons", Finistère, France with the loss of at least five of her crew. She was on a voyage from New York, United States to London.
Maitland	(United Kingdom of Great Britain and Ireland) New South Wales	The ship ran aground at Point Henry.

== 5 March ==
List of shipwrecks: 5 March 1848
Ship	State	Description
Diligente	France	The ship was wrecked near Camaret-sur-Mer, Finistère. She was on a voyage from Cette, Hérault to Havre de Grâce, Seine-Inférieure.
Francais Casimir	France	The ship was driven ashore at Tresco, Isles of Scilly, United Kingdom. She was refloated.
Sarah Hudson	United Kingdom	The ship was run ashore 12 leagues (26 nautical miles (48 km)) east of Gijón, Spain. Her crew were rescued. She was on a voyage from South Shields, County Durham to Cartagena, Spain.

== 6 March ==
List of shipwrecks: 6 March 1848
Ship	State	Description
Ann	United Kingdom	The ship ran aground and sank in the River Tyne.
Barbara	(United Kingdom of Great Britain and Ireland) British North America	The brig was driven ashore at Petty Harbour, Newfoundland with the loss of nearly 200 lives. There were 40 immediate survivors, but four or five of them subsequently died. Barbara was on a voyage from New York, United States to Cork. She was subsequently discovered in April 80 nautical miles (150 km) west of the Isles of Scilly by Franklin (United Kingdom).
Burghcastle	United Kingdom	The sloop ran aground and was damaged at North Shields, County Durham. She was on a voyage from Leith, Lothian to Newcastle upon Tyne, Northumberland. She was refloated with the assistance of two tugs and taken in to North Shields in a leaky condition.
Diana	United Kingdom	The sloop ran aground at South Shields, County Durham. She was refloated.
Earl Gowrie	United Kingdom	The brigantine was lost on the Mixon Shoal, in the Bristol Channel with the loss of all hands.
Elizabeth	United Kingdom	The ship struck the pier and sank at Aberdeen. Her crew were rescued. She was on a voyage from the Clyde to Aberdeen.
Fame	United Kingdom	The schooner was wrecked near Portreath, Cornwall with the loss of seven of the nine people on board. She was on a voyage from Swansea, Glamorgan to Portreath. Also reported as wrecked on the Mixon Sand, in the Bristol Channel.
Fifeshire	United Kingdom	The sloop was driven ashore in the River Tay with the loss of a crew member. She was refloated the next day.
Margaret Littlejohn	United Kingdom	The brig was driven ashore and severely damaged at Pulteneytown, Caithness. She was refloated and taken in to Pulteneytown.
Sydney	United Kingdom	The steam tug sprang a leak and sank at Falmouth, Cornwall.

== 7 March ==
List of shipwrecks: 7 March 1848
Ship	State	Description
Ariel	United Kingdom	The ship was driven ashore on Mauritius.
Caledonia	United Kingdom	The ship ran aground on the North Bank, in Liverpool Bay. She was on a voyage from Liverpool, Lancashire to Drogheda, County Louth. She was refloated.
Constance	France	The ship was driven ashore on Mauritius. She was later refloated.
Eliza and Esther	United Kingdom	The ship was driven ashore on Mauritius. She was later refloated.
Felk	Ottoman Empire	The brig was driven ashore on Mauritius.
Jamaica	United Kingdom	The ship was driven ashore on Mauritius. She was later refloated.
John Jones	United Kingdom	The ship ran aground and was damaged at St. Ives, Cornwall. She was on a voyage from Newhaven, Sussex to Runcorn, Cheshire. She was refloated and taken in to St. Ives.
Lady Mary	(United Kingdom of Great Britain and Ireland) British North America	The ship was damaged by ice and abandoned in the Atlantic Ocean 200 nautical miles (370 km) south of "La Poele". Her crew were rescued. She was on a voyage from Demerara, British Guiana to Saint John's, Newfoundland.
Manchester	United Kingdom	The ship was driven ashore on Mauritius.
Ora and Labora	United Kingdom	The ship ran aground at South Shields, County Durham. She was on a voyage from Christiansand, Norway to South Shields. She was refloated the next day and taken in to South Shields in a waterlogged condition. She was repaired.
Pilot Meiklewrath	United Kingdom	The ship ran aground in the River Tay. she was on a voyage from South Shields to Newburgh, Fife.
Speculation	United Kingdom	The ship ran aground on the Nailsee Rocks, Looe, Cornwall and sank. She was on a voyage from Southampton, Hampshire to Looe.
Taglioni	France	The ship was wrecked on the Carysfort Reef. She was on a voyage from Havre de Grâce, Seine-Inférieure to New Orleans, Louisiana, United States.

== 8 March ==
List of shipwrecks: 8 March 1848
Ship	State	Description
Ariel	United Kingdom	The ship was driven ashore in a hurricane at Port Louis, Mauritius.
Camilla	United Kingdom	The steamship ran aground on the Pampus, off the Dutch coast. She was on a voyage from Amsterdam, North Holland to London.
Constance	United Kingdom	The ship was driven ashore in a hurricane at Port Louis.
Eliza and Hester	United Kingdom	The ship was driven ashore in a hurricane at Port Louis.
East Anglian	United Kingdom	The ship was driven ashore in a hurricane at Port Louis.
Felk	Flag unknown	The ship was driven ashore in a hurricane at Port Louis.
Fomento	Spain	The ship ran aground on a reef 7 nautical miles (13 km) north of mouth of the New River, capsized and sank. Her crew were rescued. She was on a voyage from Havana, Cuba to "Vigero".
Harriet	United Kingdom	The ship was wrecked near Port Beaufort, Cape Colony. Her crew were rescueud.
Jamaica	United Kingdom	The ship was driven ashore in a hurricane at Port Louis.
Manchester	United Kingdom	The ship was driven ashore in a hurricane at Port Louis.
Triton	United Kingdom	The ship was driven ashore on Spiekeroog, Kingdom of Hanover. She was on a voyage from Neuharlingersiel, Kingdom of Hanover to London. She was refloated.
Wancy	France	The ship was driven ashore in a hurricane at Port Louis.

== 9 March ==
List of shipwrecks: 9 March 1848
Ship	State	Description
Alphonse	Belgium	The ship was driven ashore and wrecked near Boulogne, Pas-de-Calais, France.
Emerald Isle	United Kingdom	The ship ran aground on the Drumroof Bank, in the Irish Sea, and sank. Her crew were rescued. She was on a voyage from Dublin to Annan, Dumfriesshire.
Henry Mitchie	United Kingdom	The ship ran aground on North Sunderland Point, County Durham and sank. Her crew were rescued. She was on a voyage from Queen's Ferry to Warkworth, Northumberland.
Sidonie	France	The ship was driven ashore and capsized at Seaford, Sussex, United Kingdom.
Taporica	France	The barque foundered in the Atlantic Ocean. Her ten crew and three passengers took to the boats; they were rescued on 18 March at 28°10′N 57°40′W by Lady Pirie (United Kingdom). Taporica was on a voyage from Guadeloupe to Marseille, Bouches-du-Rhône, France.

== 10 March ==
List of shipwrecks: 10 March 1848
Ship	State	Description
Annabella	United Kingdom	The ship foundered in the Irish Sea off the coast of Anglesey with some loss of life.
Josephine	France	The ship ran aground in the Thanlwin River. She was on a voyage from Moulmein, Burma to Île Bourbon. She was refloated and put back to Moulmein.
Lark	United Kingdom	The ship ran aground and was wrecked off Redcar, Yorkshire. She was on a voyage from Hartlepool, County Durham to Littlehampton, Sussex.
Xaviera	Spain	The ship ran aground on the Bahama Banks. She was on a voyage from Bilbao to Havana, Cuba. She was refloated on 14 March and taken in to Nassau, Bahamas.

== 11 March ==
List of shipwrecks: 11 March 1848
Ship	State	Description
Albatross	(United Kingdom of Great Britain and Ireland) Antigua	The ship departed for Barbados. She was wrecked on Turtle Island, Guadeloupe before 28 March. Her crew were rescued.
Francis Barn	United States	The ship was driven ashore at Marshfield, Massachusetts. She was on a voyage from Palermo, Sicily to Boston, Massachusetts.
New Commercial	United Kingdom	The ship ran aground on the Gunfleet Sand, in the North Sea off the coast of Essex. She was on a voyage from Middlesbrough, Yorkshire to London. She was refloated with the aid of several smacks and assisted in to Harwich, Essex in a leaky condition.
Romulus	United Kingdom	The brig was driven ashore at Winterton Ness, Norfolk. She was refloated and resumed her voyage.
Scotia	United Kingdom	The schooner was driven ashore and damaged at Broad Haven, Caithness. She was on a voyage from Pulteneytown to Lybster.

== 12 March ==
List of shipwrecks: 12 March 1848
Ship	State	Description
Constitutionere	Denmark	The ship was wrecked near Gamle Hellesund, Norway.
Hazelwood	(United Kingdom of Great Britain and Ireland) Isle of Man	The schooner was driven ashore on Lindisfarne, Northumberland.
Velocity	(United Kingdom of Great Britain and Ireland) New South Wales	The schooner ran aground at Nobbys Head. She was on a voyage from Newcastle, New South Wales to Sydney.

== 13 March ==
List of shipwrecks: 13 March 1848
Ship	State	Description
Aimable Louise	France	The ship caught fire at Paris and was scuttled.
Branch	United Kingdom	The ship ran aground and was damaged on the Salthouse Bank, off the mouth of the River Ribble. She was on a voyage from Leith, Lothian to Liverpool, Lancashire.
Majestic	United Kingdom	The ship struck the North Burbo Bank, in Liverpool Bay and sank. Her crew were rescued. She was on a voyage from the Clyde to Runcorn, Cheshire.

== 14 March ==
List of shipwrecks: 14 March 1848
Ship	State	Description
Auguste Marie	France	The ship was wrecked on the Ooster bank, in the North Sea off the Dutch coast. Her crew were rescued. She was on a voyage from South Shields, County Durham, United Kingdom to Bordeaux, Gironde.
Canova	United Kingdom	The ship was driven ashore and damaged near Flamborough Head, Yorkshire. She was on a voyage from London to Sunderland, County Durham. She was refloated with assistance from the steamship Streanshalh (United Kingdom) and resumed her voyage.
Fulton	United States	The ship was driven ashore on Cape Sable Island, Nova Scotia, British North America. Her crew were rescued. She was on a voyage from Saint John's, Newfoundland, British North America to Boston, Massachusetts.
Happy Family	United Kingdom	The ship was in collision with Emily and sank in the Thames Estuary off Leigh-on-Sea, Essex. Her crew were rescued.
Nightingale	United Kingdom	The ship was wrecked at Veauville-lès-Quelles, Seine-Inférieure, France. Her crew were rescued. She was on a voyage from Truro, Cornwall to Rouen, Seine-Inférieure.
Sir Willoughby Cotton	United Kingdom	The ship departed from Saugor, India for London. No further trace, presumed foundered with the loss of all hands.

== 15 March ==
List of shipwrecks: 15 March 1848
Ship	State	Description
Harby	United Kingdom	The ship was wrecked at the mouth of the Douro. She was on a voyage from Cardiff, Glamorgan to Porto, Portugal.

== 16 March ==
List of shipwrecks: 16 March 1848
Ship	State	Description
Amaranth	United Kingdom	The schooner ran aground on the Herd Sand, in the North Sea off the coast of County Durham. Her crew were rescued by the South Shields Lifeboat. She was on a voyage from Liverpool, Lancashire to South Shields, County Durham. Amaranth was refloated on 20 March and taken in to South Shields.
Maria	Denmark	The yacht was wrecked near Fredrikshavn.
Neptune	(United Kingdom of Great Britain and Ireland) Jersey	The barque was severely damaged at Cardiff, Glamorgan by an explosion in her cargo of steam coal.
Union	United Kingdom	The schooner ran aground on the Herd Sand. Her crew were rescued by the South Shields Lifeboat. She was on a voyage from the Clyde to South Shields. Union was refloated on 19 March and take in to South Shields.

== 17 March ==
List of shipwrecks: 17 March 1848
Ship	State	Description
Charles	United Kingdom	The ship ran aground on a sandbank off Cunill, Spain. She was on a voyage from Newport, Monmouthshire to Barcelona, Spain.
Rainbow	United Kingdom	The ship ran aground on the Vogel Sand, in the North Sea. She was on a voyage from Hartlepool, County Durham to Hamburg. She was refloated and taken in to the Elbe.
Rainbow	United States	The clipper departed from New York for Valparaíso, Chile. No further trace, presumed foundered with the loss of all hands.
Thetis	United Kingdom	The ship was driven ashore at Europa Point, Gibraltar. She was on a voyage from Agrigento, Sicily to Newcastle upon Tyne. She was refloated the next day and taken in to Gibraltar.

== 18 March ==
List of shipwrecks: 18 March 1848
Ship	State	Description
Tanjore	United Kingdom	The ship ran aground in the Hooghly River. She was on a voyage from London to Calcutta, India. She was refloated.

== 20 March ==
List of shipwrecks: 20 March 1848
Ship	State	Description
Henry	United Kingdom	The ship was wrecked on The Manacles. Her crew were rescued. She was on a voyage from Charlestown, Cornwall to Cardiff, Glamorgan.
James and Mary	United Kingdom	The ship was driven ashore at Great Yarmouth, Norfolk. She was on a voyage from Sunderland, County Durham to Great Yarmouth. She was refloated and taken in.
Victoria	United Kingdom	The brig was wrecked on the Proudfeet Rocks, off the coast of Caithness. Her six crew survived. She was on a voyage from London to Wick, Caithness.

== 21 March ==
List of shipwrecks: 21 March 1848
Ship	State	Description
Alert	United Kingdom	The ship was driven ashore at Grainthorpe, Lincolnshire. She was on a voyage from Liverpool, Lancashire to Hull, Yorkshire.
Cleofrid	United Kingdom	The brig was wrecked on the Sizewell Bank, in the North Sea off the coast of Suffolk. Her nine crew were rescued by the Southwold Lifeboat. She was on a voyage from South Shields, County Durham to London.
Samaritan's Hope	United Kingdom	The ship foundered in the North Sea 50 nautical miles (93 km) off the coast of Denmark. Her crew were rescued by London (United Kingdom). Samaritan's Hope was on a voyage from Sunderland, County Durham to Swinemünde, Prussia.

== 22 March ==
List of shipwrecks: 22 March 1848
Ship	State	Description
Agenoria	United Kingdom	The brig ran aground on the Gunfleet Sand, in the North Sea off the coast of Essex. She was on a voyage from South Shields, County Durham to London. She was refloated and taken in to Harwich, Essex in a leaky condition.
Endymion	United Kingdom	The ship was driven ashore on the Budj Budj Sands, India. She was on a voyage from Liverpool, Lancashire to Calcutta, India.

== 23 March ==
List of shipwrecks: 23 March 1848
Ship	State	Description
Adrian	United Kingdom	The ship was damaged by fire at New Orleans, Louisiana, United States.
Albert	(United Kingdom of Great Britain and Ireland) Jamaica	The sloop was wrecked on a reef off Jamaica.
Garland	United Kingdom	The ship ran aground on the Newcombe Sand, in the North Sea off the coast of Suffolk. She was on a voyage from London to South Shields, County Durham. She was refloated and taken in to Lowestoft, Suffolk.
Harlington	United Kingdom	The ship was driven ashore at Deal, Kent. she was on a voyage from Sunderland, County Durham to Portsmouth, Hampshire. She was refloated and taken in to The Downs.

== 24 March ==
List of shipwrecks: 24 March 1848
Ship	State	Description
Fame	United States	The ship ran aground on the Tuckernuck Shoals. She was refloated but was driven ashore near the Cape Poge Lighthouse, Massachusetts and wrecked. She was on a voyage from Windsor, Connecticut, to Bridgeport, Connecticut.

== 25 March ==
List of shipwrecks: 25 March 1848
Ship	State	Description
Heroesmo da Terceira	Portugal	The schooner struck a sunken rock and was abandoned by her crew. She was on a voyage from Porto to New York, United States. She was subsequently towed in to Porto in a severely damaged condition.
Queen Pomare	United Kingdom	The ship was driven ashore and capsized on the Round Reef. She was on a voyage from Saint John's, Newfoundland, British North America to Liverpool, Lancashire. She was refloated in April and taken in to Heneaga.

== 26 March ==
List of shipwrecks: 26 March 1848
Ship	State	Description
Carysfort	United Kingdom	The schooner was driven ashore and wrecked at Comlyn Point, Anglesey. She was on a voyage from Liverpool, Lancashire to Wexford.

== 28 March ==
List of shipwrecks: 28 March 1848
Ship	State	Description
Dunnottar Castle	United Kingdom	The barque was driven ashore near Contre Point, Gironde, France. She had become a wreck by 15 April.
Eliza Watson	United Kingdom	The schooner was driven ashore at Scurdie Ness, Forfarshire.
Wigrams	United Kingdom	The full-rigged ship was driven ashore in Mechanics Bay, New Zealand. She was on a voyage from Sydney, New South Wales to Auckland, New Zealand. She was refloated.
Worcester	United Kingdom	The schooner was driven ashore in the River Severn at Lydney, Gloucestershire.

== 29 March ==
List of shipwrecks: 29 March 1848
Ship	State	Description
Philippe Auguste	France	The steamship was wrecked off Palma de Mallorca, Spain. She was on a voyage from Marseille, Bouches-du-Rhône to a port in Algeria.

== 30 March ==
List of shipwrecks: 30 March 1848
Ship	State	Description
Hedwick	Prussia	The ship ran aground at St. Ubes, Portugal and was consequently beached at Cape Espichel, where she was wrecked. Her crew were rescued. She was on a voyage from St. Ubes to a Baltic port.
Mary Ann	United Kingdom	The ship was driven ashore on the south coast of the Isle of Wight. She was on a voyage from Llanelly, Glamorgan to London.
Toreno	France	The barque was wrecked on the Morant Cays. She was on a voyage from Santa Marta, Republic of New Granada to Marseille, Bouches-du-Rhône.

== 31 March ==
List of shipwrecks: 31 March 1848
Ship	State	Description
Advocate	United Kingdom	The ship was driven ashore at Alicante, Spain. She was on a voyage from Alicante to Constantinople, Ottoman Empire. She was refloated.
Ann	United Kingdom	The schooner ran aground of the Shipwash Sand, in the North Sea off the coast of Essex. She was on a voyage from Middlesbrough, Yorkshire to Plymouth, Devon. She was refloated and taken in to Harwich, Essex .
Princess Royal	United Kingdom	The full-rigged ship was driven ashore and wrecked in Norta Bay. Her crew were rescued.
Toreno	France	The barque was wrecked on the Morant Keys. Her crew were rescued. She was on a voyage from Santa Marta, Republic of New Granada to Marseille, Bouches-du-Rhône.

== Unknown date ==
List of shipwrecks: Unknown date in March 1848
Ship	State	Description
Elizabeth	United Kingdom	The ship was wrecked on Erromango with loss of life.
Ganges	United Kingdom	The ship ran aground at Newcastle, New South Wales before 14 March. She was on a voyage from Newcastle to New Zealand. She was refloated on 16 March and resumed her voyage.
Gloria	United Kingdom	The schooner ran aground on the Gunfleet Sand, in the North Sea off the coast of Essex. She was refloated and resumed her voyage.
Hortense Marie	France	The ship foundered in the English Channel before 21 March.
John Bull	United Kingdom	The ship was abandoned off the Cape of Good Hope, Cape Colony before 15 March.
Libra	United Kingdom	The ship was abandoned in the Bay of Biscay before 12 March. Her crew were rescued by Mount Etna (United Kingdom). Libra was on a voyage from Porto, Portugal to London. She came ashore near "Saint Nicholas".
Lively	United Kingdom	The ship ran aground on the Gunfleet Sand. She was refloated and resumed her voyage.
Manche	France	The ship was in collision with another vessel and sank at Bordeaux, Gironde.
Olivia	United Kingdom	The ship foundered off the coast of Devon before 13 March.
Omega	United Kingdom	The ship was abandoned in the Atlantic Ocean before 10 March. she was on a voyage from Liverpool, Lancashire to New York, United States.
USS Petrita	United States Navy	The steamship was wrecked near Alvarado, Mexico before 6 March.
Richard	Flag unknown	The ship was driven ashore near Paimpol, Côtes-du-Nord, France before 7 March. She was on a voyage from Lisbon, Portugal to Stettin.
Ripson	United Kingdom	The ship ran aground on the Gunfleet Sand. She was on a voyage from Newcastle upon Tyne, Northumberland to London. She was refloated and taken in to the River Colne.
Sisters	United Kingdom	The smack was driven ashore in Bootle Bay before 15 March. She floated off and was towed in to Liverpool.
Skipton	United Kingdom	The ship foundered in the English Channel in early March with the loss of all hands. She was on a voyage from Odesa to London.
Thomas Wegulin	United Kingdom	The ship was abandoned in the Atlantic Ocean before 7 March with the loss of a crew member. She was on a voyage from Newcastle upon Tyne to Havana, Cuba.
