= Lake trout (disambiguation) =

Lake trout (Salvelinus namaycush) is a species of char.

Lake trout or Lake Trout may also refer to:

- Lacustrine (lake-dwelling) populations of other species, especially brown trout
- Lake trout (seafood), fried Atlantic whiting
- Lake Trout (band), an American rock band

== See also ==
- Salvelinus umbla, lake char
- Trout Lake (disambiguation)
