= Henry Boynton Clitz =

American Army officer (1824–1888)

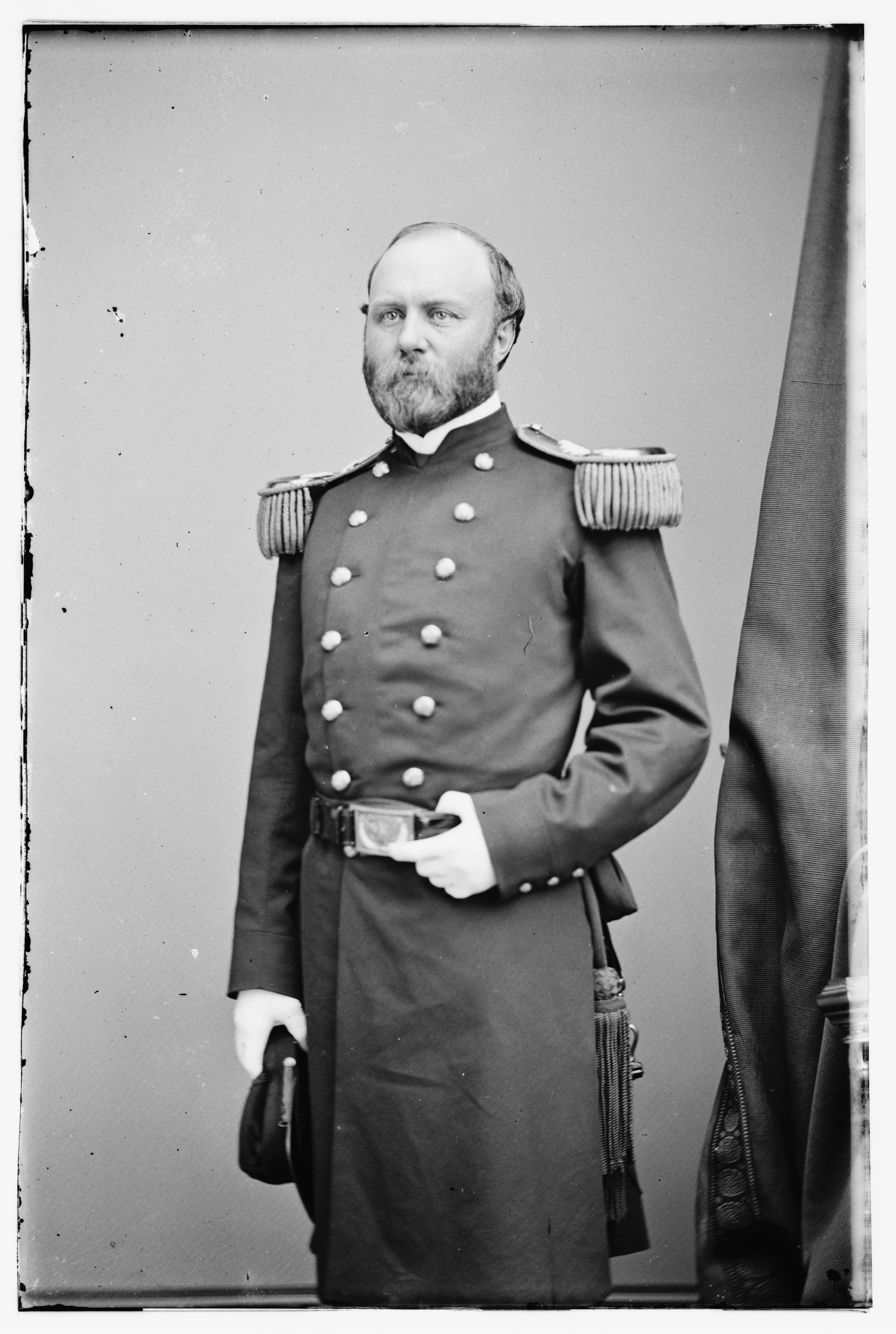
- Born: July 4, 1824; Sackets Harbor, New York, U.S.
- Died: October 30, 1888 (aged 64) (presumed); Niagara Falls, New York, U.S.
- Burial place: Detroit, Michigan, U.S. (cenotaph)
- Relatives: John M. B. Clitz (brother)
- Military career
- Allegiance: United States
- Branch: United States Army; Union Army
- Service years: 1845–1885
- Rank: Colonel; Brevet Brigadier General
- Commands: 1st Battalion, 12th U.S. Infantry Regiment; United States Military Academy; 10th U.S. Infantry Regiment; 6th U.S. Infantry Regiment
- Conflicts: Mexican–American War: Battle of Monterey; Battle of Cerro Gordo; Siege of Veracruz; Battle of Contreras; Battle of Churubusco; Battle of Chapultepec; Battle for Mexico City; American Civil War: Siege of Yorktown (1862); Battle of Gaines's Mill

Henry Boynton Clitz (July 4, 1824 – October 30, 1888) was a career United States Army officer who served with distinction during the Mexican–American and Civil wars, for which he received brevet appointments. After his release as a prisoner of war from the Confederate Libby Prison in Richmond, Virginia, on July 17, 1862, Clitz was Commandant of Cadets at the United States Military Academy at West Point, New York, from October 23, 1862, to July 4, 1864. He was nominated and confirmed for appointment as a brevet brigadier general in the Regular Army on March 2, 1867, to rank from March 13, 1865. He retired from the Regular Army as a colonel of the 10th Infantry Regiment on July 1, 1885. Clitz, whose deteriorating mental state had been noticed by relatives for several months, disappeared at Niagara Falls, New York, and was presumed drowned on October 30, 1888.

== Early life ==
Henry Boynton Clitz was born at Sackets Harbor, New York, on July 4, 1824. His parents were Lieutenant John Clitz and Mary Gale Mellen Clitz, who were married in Plattsburgh, New York, in 1819. John Clitz was a captain and commander of Fort Mackinac, Michigan, when he died in 1836. His widow was left with four sons and four daughters. His older brother John M. B. Clitz joined the U.S. Navy in 1837. Mary Clitz moved to Detroit, Michigan, where she lived for the rest of her life.

Clitz was appointed to the United States Military Academy at large and was a cadet from July 1, 1841, to July 1, 1845. He graduated July 1, 1845, ranked 36 in a class of 41. Upon graduation, Clitz was appointed a brevet second lieutenant in the 7th Infantry Regiment. He served in the military occupation of Texas in 1845–46.

== Mexican–American War ==
In 1846–1848, Clitz served in the Mexican–American War. He was engaged with his regiment in the defense of Fort Brown, Texas, May 3–9, 1846. Clitz was promoted to second lieutenant, 3rd Infantry Regiment, September 21, 1846. He was engaged with his new regiment at the Battle of Monterrey, September 21–23, 1846, the Siege of Veracruz, March 9–29, and the Battle of Cerro Gordo, April 17–18, 1847. Clitz received a brevet appointment as first lieutenant in the Regular Army on April 18, 1847, for gallant and meritorious conduct at the Battle of Cerro Gordo.

Clitz was further engaged with his regiment at the Skirmish of Ocalaca, August 16, 1847, the Battle of Contreras, August 19–20, 1847, the Battle of Churubusco, August 20, 1847, the Battle of Chapultepec, September 13, 1847, and Battle for Mexico City, including the assault and capture of the city on September 13–14, 1847.

Clitz was an original member of the Aztec Club of 1847, which was founded as a military society of officers who served with the United States Army in the Mexican–American War.

== Assignments: 1848–1861 ==
After the Mexican–American War, Clitz served at the US Military Academy, as Assistant Instructor of Infantry Tactics, from September 15, 1848, to September 27, 1855. He was promoted to first lieutenant in the 3rd U.S. Infantry Regiment (The Old Guard) on March 5, 1851.

Upon leaving West Point, Clitz was assigned to frontier duty at Santa Fe, New Mexico, in 1856. Then he served in turn at Fort Union, New Mexico, 1856; Santa Fe, New Mexico, 1856–1857; Cantonment Burgwin, New Mexico, 1857; Fort Defiance, New Mexico, later Arizona, 1857; and Albuquerque, New Mexico, 1857–1858.

Clitz was promoted to captain in the 3rd Infantry Regiment on December 6, 1858. He was on recruiting service, 1858–1859, followed by a leave of absence spent in Europe, 1859–1860. Upon his return he was on frontier duty with his regiment at Ringgold Barracks, Texas, 1860–1861, and Fort Brown, Texas, 1861.

== American Civil War: combat ==
Clitz served in the defense of Fort Pickens, Florida from Confederate States Army assault between April 19, 1861, and June 27, 1861. He was promoted to major, 12th Infantry Regiment (United States), a Regular Army formation, on May 14, 1861. He was on recruiting duty for the 12th Infantry, and stationed at Fort Hamilton, New York, between July 7, 1861, and March 10, 1862.

Clitz commanded the 1st Battalion of the 12th US Infantry Regiment, the only battalion ready for combat duty, in the Peninsula Campaign from March through June 1862. Clitz was engaged in the Siege of Yorktown, from April 5, 1862, to May 4, 1862. Clitz was wounded at Yorktown but continued in command.

At the Battle of Gaines's Mill on June 27, 1862, Clitz was severely wounded in both legs and captured by the Confederate forces. The Union Army had begun a retreat to the James River at Harrison's Landing. The 12th and 14th US Infantry Regiments were attacked by a much larger Confederate force as they tried to hold the line while Union Army wagons and other units withdrew. The 12th US Infantry Regiment lost 54 killed, 102 wounded and 56 missing out of 470 who went into action. Clitz was reported dead, although he actually was severely wounded and captured.

Clitz was taken to the McGehee House, a prominent battlefield landmark, where his Mexican–American War colleague, Confederate Major General D. H. Hill called for a surgeon to dress his old friend's wounds. Clitz was appointed brevet lieutenant colonel in the Regular Army to rank from June 27, 1862, for gallant and meritorious conduct at the Battle of Gaines's Mill, Virginia.

Clitz was held as a prisoner of war in Libby Prison, at Richmond, Virginia, from June 28, 1862, to July 17, 1862, when he was paroled for exchange.

== Commandant of Cadets at West Point and garrison duty ==
Clitz served at the US Military Academy, as Commandant of Cadets and Instructor of Artillery, Infantry, and Cavalry Tactics, from October 23, 1862, to July 4, 1864. During this time, he was promoted to lieutenant colonel of the 6th United States Infantry Regiment on November 4, 1863.

Following his service at West Point, Clitz served on garrison duty at Bedloe's Island, New York City, from July 1864 to May 1865. For his "gallant and meritorious services during the Rebellion" he received a brevet appointment as colonel in the Regular Army.

== Later life ==
Clitz served at Savannah, Georgia from May 22, 1865, to July 3, 1865, at Hilton Head, South Carolina from July 3, 1865, to December 9, 1865, and at Charleston, South Carolina from December 9, 1865, to June 21, 1866.

Clitz then served as a member of Tactics Board from June 25, 1866, to February 4, 1867. To cope with the increase in firepower of artillery, repeating rifles and Gatling guns, the Tactics Board recommended that the US Army adopt the more modern tactics described by Union Army Brigadier General (Brevet Major General) Emory Upton in his 1867 work, published in 1872: A New System of Infantry Tactics, Double and Single Rank, Adapted to American Topography and Improved Fire-Arms. Upton stressed light column formations instead of the close order formations that led to many casualties at battles such as the Battle of Cold Harbor in 1864. Commanding General William T. Sherman supported these recommendations but they failed to gain adherence from many older officers and the US Army bureaucracy.

On March 2, 1867, President Andrew Johnson nominated Clitz for appointment to the grade of brevet brigadier general in the Regular Army for "gallant and distinguished services in the field," to rank from March 13, 1865, and the United States Senate confirmed the appointment on the same day, March 2, 1867.

Clitz was in command of the 6th US Infantry Regiment from March 21, 1867, to June 16, 1867; in command of the post at Charleston, South Carolina, from March 21, 1867, to June 15, 1868; on leave of absence from June 15, 1868, to October 24, 1868; and again in command at Charleston, South Carolina from October 24, 1868, to April 6, 1869.

Clitz was promoted to colonel, 10th United States Infantry Regiment on February 22, 1869. He was in command of the regiment and of Fort Brown, Texas from April 24, 1869, to May 14, 1871; on leave of absence from May 14, 1871, to September 1872; on duty as a member of Board for Revising Army Regulations from September 1872 to May 26, 1873; awaiting orders from May 26, 1873, to July 1873; in command of his regiment and Fort McKavett, Texas, from July 14, 1873, to June 10, 1876; on leave of absence, June 10, 1876, to October 10, 1876; and again in command at Fort McKavett from October 23, 1876, to August 29, 1877. Clitz was on sick leave of absence from August 29, 1877, to December 31, 1877, and in command of his regiment at Fort McKavett, Texas, and of the District of North Texas from January 22, 1878, to May 11, 1879.

Clitz completed his service in command at Fort Wayne (Detroit) from May 1879 to September 19, 1879; on court martial duty to November 27, 1879; again in command of his regiment at Fort Wayne, Detroit, Michigan, from November 1879 to June 2, 1884; on leave of absence and on delay, from June 2, 1884, to July 1, 1884; and on sick leave of absence from July 1, 1884, to July 1, 1885.

Clitz retired from active service in the US Army, upon his own application, July 1, 1885. He then lived in Detroit, Michigan "where he was a universal favorite among his fellows, and the devoted son of an aged mother". He was also described in the biographical sketch in General Cullum's Biographical Register of the Officers and Graduates of the United States Military Academy as having "personal magnetism" and a "genial nature."

== Disappearance ==
A story in The New York Times on October 30, 1888, described Clitz's last days before his disappearance. The story noted that Clitz had never married. It stated that "members of his household, including his aged mother, a widowed mother, and a niece," had noticed "his mind was clouded" over the past two months. About three weeks before he left home, he was suffering from "acute nervous dyspepsia, and his mental aberrations became more marked." The story said that a dispatch from General G. A. DeRussey had arrived from London, Ontario saying that Clitz had arrived there on Friday and left on Saturday afternoon saying only he was going "for the East." The police in New York were making inquiries about Clitz upon the request of the Chief of Police of Washington, D.C.

Clitz was last seen at Niagara Falls, New York, on October 30, 1888. On this date he "disappeared and [was] supposed to have drowned."

A memorial cenotaph was erected in his honor at Elmwood Cemetery.

== See also ==
- List of American Civil War brevet generals (Union)
- List of Commandants of Cadets of the United States Military Academy
- List of people who disappeared
