= John Henry Upshur =

American admiral (1823–1917)

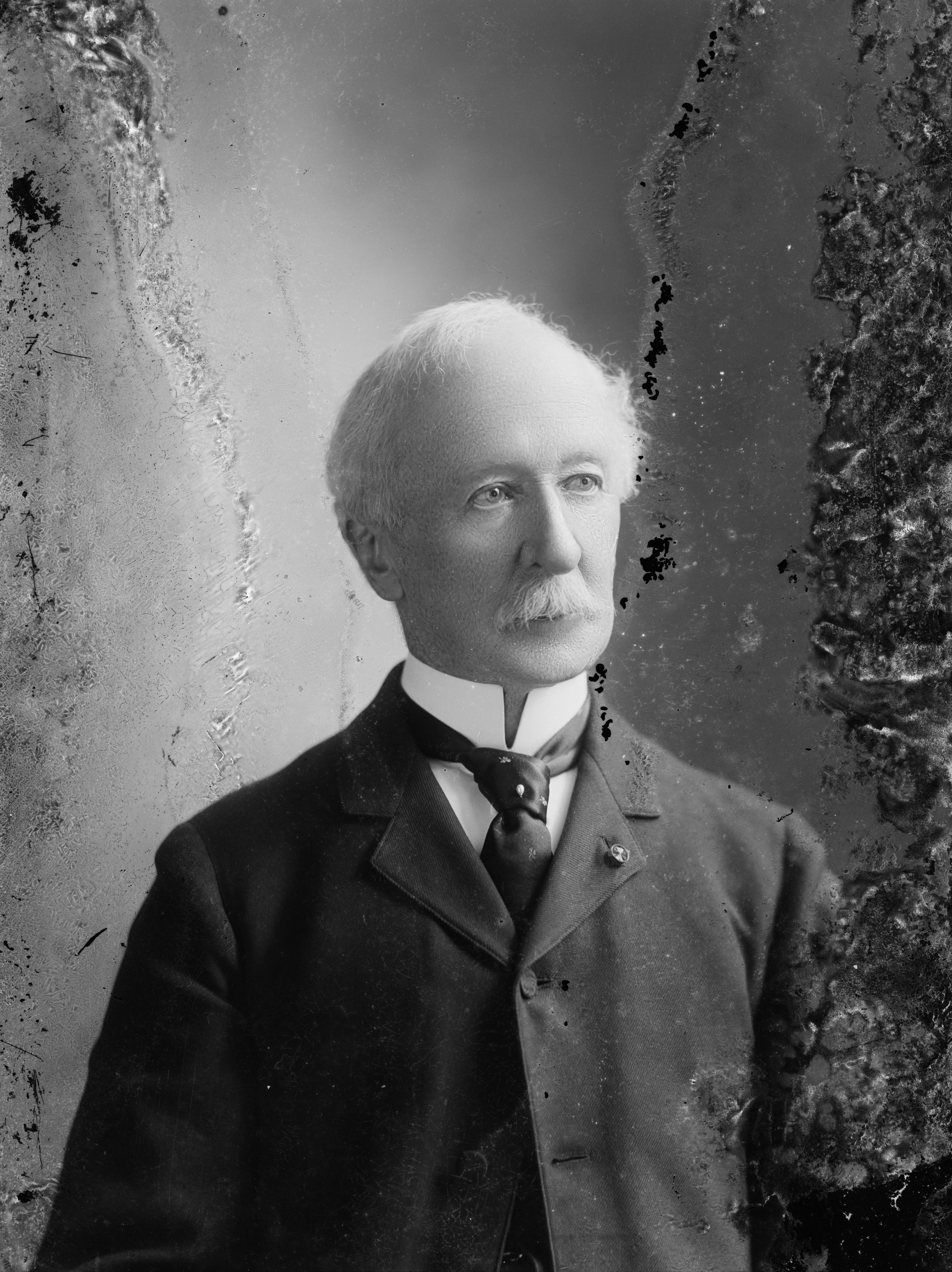
- Upshur, 1894–1901
- Born: December 5, 1823; Northampton County, Virginia
- Died: May 30, 1917 (aged 93); Washington, D.C.
- Military career
- Allegiance: United States of America
- Branch: U.S. Navy
- Service years: 1841–1885
- Rank: Rear Admiral
- Units: USS St. Mary's; Naval Academy; Washington Navy Yard; USS Supply; USS Wabash
- Commands: Pacific Squadron; New York Navy Yard; USS Brooklyn; USS Pensacola; USS Saratoga; USS Frolic; USS A. D. Vance; USS Minnesota; USS Flambeau
- Conflicts: Vera Cruz; Mexican–American War; American Civil War

John Henry Upshur (5 December 1823 – 30 May 1917) was an admiral in the United States Navy who served during the Mexican–American War and the American Civil War.

== Early life ==
Upshur—born John Henry Nottingham in Northampton County, Virginia, on December 5, 1823—changed his name at the request of his mother to her maiden name "Upshur", gratifying her wish, as the Upshur family was conspicuous in naval annals. He was appointed a midshipman on 4 November 1841 and initially served at sea with the Mediterranean Squadron. During the war with Mexico, Upshur was assigned to St. Mary's as that brig participated in operations against Tampico. He also served ashore with the naval battery during the attacks against Vera Cruz in March 1847. Having completed his training both at sea and in the classroom, Upshur was graduated from the United States Naval Academy on 10 August 1848 as a passed midshipman.

In the years preceding the Civil War, Upshur carried out assignments in the Mediterranean, the West Indian, and the African Squadrons. He also performed brief tours of duty at the Naval Academy and at the Washington Navy Yard as an ordnance officer. From 1853 to 1856, Upshur served in Supply during Commodore Matthew Calbraith Perry's expeditions to Japan which opened that nation to the west. He was promoted to lieutenant on 14 September 1855.

== Civil War ==
Unlike cousin Robert E. Lee, Upshur stayed with the Union military during the American Civil War, resisting much family pressure to choose the Confederacy. He was assigned to the North Atlantic Blockading Squadron, and participated in the capture of the Southern forts at Hatteras Inlet 1861 which opened the North Carolina sounds to Union forces. Upshur was executive officer of Wabash during the expedition which wrested Port Royal, South Carolina, from Confederate hands. He also commanded four boats in Commander C. R. P Rodgers's expedition in the inland coast waters in the vicinity of Port Royal and Beaufort, South Carolina. Promoted to lieutenant commander, 16 July 1862, Upshur served in the South Atlantic Blockading Squadron in charge of the steamer USS Flambeau from 1862 to 1863 during operations against Charleston. He returned to the North Atlantic Blockading Squadron in time for the abortive joint expedition against Fort Fisher late in December 1864. Upshur was in the expedition which finally carried the Southern works guarding Wilmington in mid-January 1865. He commanded the squadron flagship USS Minnesota from 1863 to 1864 and the steamer USS A. D. Vance from 1864 to 1865.

== Post Civil War ==
After the Civil War, Upshur served in a succession of sea and shore billets, promoted to commander, 25 July 1866, and given the USS Frolic, on the Mediterranean station, in 1865–1867. He also commanded USS Saratoga from 1868 to 1870. Promoted to captain, 31 January 1872, Upshur commanded USS Pensacola from 1872 to 1873 and USS Brooklyn, on the South Atlantic station, from 1875 to 1876. He served as a member of the board of inspectors in 1877–1880. He had a leave of absence, during which he visited Europe, in 1880, and upon his return was a member of the board of examiners. Promoted to commodore in July 1880, Upshur served as commandant of the New York Navy Yard from 1882 to 1884. Promoted to rear admiral in October 1884, he ended his service as commander of the Pacific Squadron from 1884 to 1885. Rear Admiral Upshur retired on 1 June 1885 and died from heart disease at his home in Washington, D.C. on 30 May 1917. He was interred at Arlington National Cemetery three days later.

He commissioned the building in 1884, with design by architect Frederick C. Withers, a Queen Anne home, later known as United States Daughters of 1812, National Headquarters.

== Namesake ==
USS Upshur (DD-144) was named for him. The second USS Upshur (T-AP-198) was named for Major General William Peterkin Upshur, USMC.
