= Trout Creek =

Trout Creek may refer to

- Trout Creek, Alaska, a hospitality stop of the Yukon Quest sled dog race
- Trout Creek (Cannonsville Reservoir tributary), in New York
- Trout Creek (Deschutes River), in Oregon
- Trout Creek (Lake Tahoe), California, a tributary of Lake Tahoe
- Trout Creek (Los Gatos Creek tributary), California, a tributary of Los Gatos Creek
- Trout Creek (Truckee River tributary), California, a tributary of the Truckee River
- Trout Creek, Michigan, a community in Interior Township, Ontonagon County, Michigan, USA
- Trout Creek (Michigan), a tributary of the Ontonagon River
- Trout Creek, Montana, a census-designated place in the U.S. state of Montana
- Trout Creek (Monument Creek), a tributary of Monument Creek
- Trout Creek Pass, a mountain pass in the Rocky Mountains of the U.S. state of Colorado
- Trout Creek, Ontario, a community in the Canadian province of Ontario
- Trout Creek Mountains, Oregon/Nevada
- Trout Creek (Lake Erie), a watershed administered by the Long Point Region Conservation Authority, that drains into Lake Erie

== See also ==
- Trout Brook (disambiguation)
- Trout Run (disambiguation)
