= Social Betterment Properties International =

Scientology real estate management company

Social Betterment Properties International (SBPI) is a California-based corporation associated with the Church of Scientology, for which it operates as a real estate arm. The organisation states that its purpose is to "develop and maintain buildings and other real estate utilized by social betterment organizations carrying out programs that utilize technology and methods developed by L. Ron Hubbard and that are associated with and supported by the Scientology". It has been involved in the purchase of a number of properties in the United States and Canada in order to advance Scientology's "social betterment" programs, notably the controversial Narconon drug rehabilitation program.

== Status ==
SBPI states in its articles of incorporation that it is "an integrated auxiliary of the Church of Scientology International", organised "to support Church of Scientology International by owning and managing real property used in Church of Scientology International's charitable public benefit program." Established in 2003, it is registered as a 501(c) organization (i.e. a tax-exempt nonprofit organization) and is not required to file an annual return with the IRS as it is designated as a religious organization. SBPI is co-located with the Church of Scientology International at 6331 Hollywood Boulevard, Los Angeles. In 2008, an IRS Form 990 filed by SBPI stated that it had $39,647,311 of assets.

== Activities ==
According to SPBI's IRS Form 990, it owed three properties as of 2008:

- Headquarters of Applied Scholastics International at Spanish Lake, Missouri;
- Narconon Arrowhead property at Canadian, Oklahoma;
- Headquarters of Citizens Commission on Human Rights International in Los Angeles, California.

The organisation's property portfolio has expanded since then. In April 2013, it was disclosed that SBPI had paid $5 million to purchase the estate of actor Larry Hagman at Ojai, California. The purpose of this purchase was not disclosed but Mike Rinder, the former head of the church's Office of Special Affairs, has suggested that it may be intended for use as a "celebrity Narconon".

Also in 2013, SBPI purchased the former Trout Run retreat near Thurmont, Maryland with the intention of converting it into a Narconon facility. The property was purchased for $4.85 million by a Delaware corporation, West Coast Property Investments Inc., which then turned Trout Run over to SBPI. Although zoning restrictions meant that establishing such a facility at Trout Run would ordinarily be impossible, using it as a group home would be permitted under local ordinances if the property was listed on the county's historic register. Narconon sought to obtain such a designation but was rejected by the local county council. As of August 1, 2015, the decision is currently being appealed.

In 2014, SBPI acquired a parcel of land in an isolated part of the Canadian town Milton, Ontario and applied for permission to establish a Narconon center there. It was turned down in October 2014 by a local municipal committee, a decision that was upheld on appeal in June 2015 by the Ontario Municipal Board.

== See also ==
- List of Scientology organizations
- Scientology front groups
