= USS Advance (1862) =

Gunboat of the United States Navy

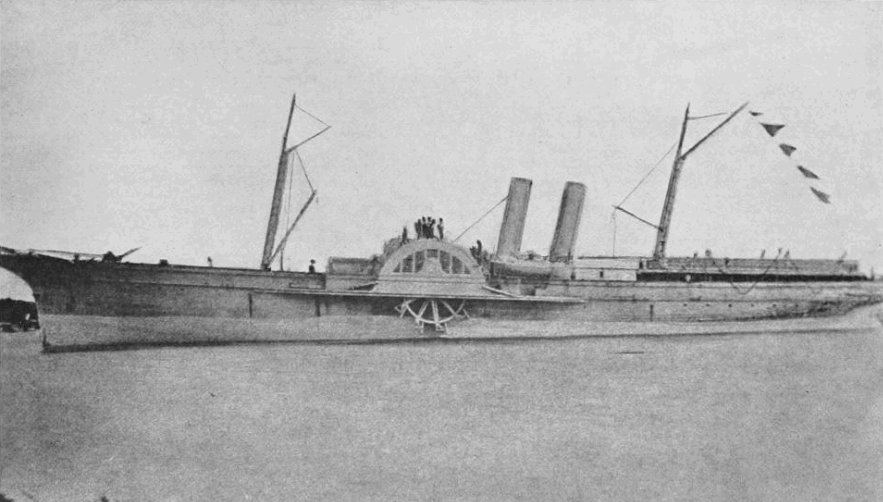
- Advance (later USS Frolic) shortly after her capture by USS Santiago de Cuba in 1864

History

United States
- Name: USS Advance
- Builder: Caird & Co. (Greenock, Scotland)
- Launched: 3 July 1862
- Christened: Lord Clyde
- Acquired: (USN): 10 September 1864
- Commissioned: 28 October 1864
- Decommissioned: 31 October 1877
- Renamed: Advance (A. D. Vance) (1862); USS Advance (1864); USS Frolic (1865)
- Stricken: October 1883 (est.)
- Home port: Norfolk, Virginia; New York City
- Captured: by Union Navy forces; 10 September 1864
- Fate: Sold, 1 October 1883

General characteristics
- Displacement: 880 tons
- Length: 230 ft (70 m)
- Beam: 26 ft (7.9 m)
- Draught: 11 ft 8 in (3.56 m)
- Propulsion: steam engine; side-wheel propelled
- Speed: 12 knots
- Complement: 107 (from 1864)
- Armament: (from 1864) one 20-pounder rifle four 24-pounder howitzers

USS Advance, the second United States Navy ship to be so named, was later known as USS Frolic, and was originally the blockade runner Advance captured by the Union Navy during the latter part of the American Civil War. She was purchased by the Union Navy and outfitted as a gunboat and assigned to the blockade of the waterways of the Confederate States of America. She also served as dispatch ship and supply vessel when military action eventually slowed.

== Construction and Irish service ==
Lord Clyde, named for Scottish military officer Colin Campbell, 1st Baron Clyde, was built for the packet service between Ireland and Scotland operated by the Dublin & Glasgow Sailing and Steam Packet Company. She was launched at Greenock, Scotland, by Caird & Co. as Yard No.97 on 3 July 1862. Lord Clyde was an iron-hulled vessel with a length of 237.5 ft (72.4 m), a beam of 26.1 ft (8.0 m), a depth of 14.8 ft (4.5 m) and a draft of 11.0 ft (3.4 m). She measured 778 GRT and 457 NRT and was powered by a 2-cylinder oscillating side-lever steam engine of 350 nhp, also made by Caird, driving two side paddle wheels. On completion she conducted sea trials on 18 September 1862 and sailed from Greenock five days later for Kingstown, Dublin to commence her regular service with Glasgow.

== Service with the Confederacy ==
During the American Civil War, a growing shortage of supplies for the manufacture of uniforms for North Carolina troops in 1862 prompted incoming governor Zebulon B. Vance to propose that the state purchase its own blockade runner. With the assistance of British businessman Alexander Collie, Lord Clyde was purchased by the state of North Carolina and on 28 June 1863 she successfully ran the Union blockade into Wilmington. At Wilmington the ship was changed to local registry and renamed Advance (some sources state A. D. Vance in honor of the Governor). (Note: In all official correspondence and port records the name used is Advance.)

Three months later, a half share in Advance was sold to the firm of Power, Low & Co. in order to raise funds towards purchasing additional ships. She successfully passed through the blockade between the Cape Fear River and Nassau or Bermuda some seventeen times between June 1863 and September 1864, under the command of Lt. John J. Guthrie, CSN.

== Capture by the Union Navy ==
Advance was commanded by Capt. Tom Crossan when captured by USS Santiago de Cuba on 10 September 1864 when she attempted to put to sea from Wilmington, North Carolina. Gov. Vance attributed her capture to use of low grade North Carolina bituminous coal and denounced Confederate Secretary of the Navy Stephen Mallory for giving the stockpile of smokeless anthracite to CSS Tallahassee (a raiding cruiser) so that none was left for Advance to run out of Wilmington safely. Writing on 3 January 1865, Vance complained:

Why a State struggling for the common good, to clothe and provide for its troops in the public service, should meet with no more favor than a blockade gambler passes my comprehension.

Advance was condemned by the New York prize court, and she was purchased by the Navy that same month; then commissioned at the New York Navy Yard on 28 October 1864, Lt. Comdr. John H. Upshur in command.

== Civil War service ==
=== Bombardment of Fort Fisher ===
Advance departed New York City on 30 October; arrived off Wilmington, North Carolina, on 14 November; and joined the North Atlantic Blockading Squadron. In addition to her reversed role—catching blockade runners as opposed to being one—she participated in the two expeditions against Fort Fisher, located on Confederate (Federal) Point at the mouth of the Cape Fear River.

The first – abortive—attempt was carried out between 24 and 26 December 1864 after a bizarre attempt to flatten some of the defenses by running what amounted to a fire-ship stocked with some 30 tons of gunpowder aground at a point some 250 to 300 yards north of the fort. Needless to say, that unique shore bombardment proved to be a huge flash in the pan causing little or no damage. When the fleet moved in on 24 December, Advance was in the 1st Reserve Division which appears to have constituted a second line of bombarding ships behind the ironclads. She fired only her large 20-pounder rifle and stopped that when she had to go to the assistance of the stricken USS Osceola and tow her to a safe anchorage.

The following day, Christmas 1864, she and five or six other warships moved off to draw fire from Half Moon Battery as preparation for the Army's landings. Though an 8-inch gun in the Confederate battery drove off other vessels in the division as well as some Union Army transports, Advance claimed credit for silencing that gun with her heavy rifle. The Army landed late Christmas Day. Firing continued through the day and intermittently that night—fire that degenerated into covering fire to protect the bogged-down Federals instead of a bombardment preparatory to the by-then cancelled assault. Advance retired from Cape Fear on the 26th and the remnants of General Butler's Army force embarked on the 27th.

After a visit to Norfolk, Virginia, for supplies between 31 December 1864 and 11 January 1865, Advance returned to her blockade station off the Cape Fear River mouth on 13 January – Friday the 13th, to be exact, an ominous day for the Southerners defending Fort Fisher. Before dawn that day, the Federal fleet unleashed a terrific bombardment on the fort. Not long thereafter, around 0800, about 8,000 Union troops began landing on the peninsula north of the fortifications.

The following day, the fleet resumed its bombardment while the Union Army began landing its own supporting artillery. Advance, in one of the reserve divisions, helped support the landing of the Army guns and supplies while the bulk of the fleet continued to batter the Fort Fisher defenses. The main attack commenced on 15 January 1865. The Army, aided by sailors and marines from the fleet, stormed the Southern positions. Heavily outnumbered and outgunned, the Confederates fought with the tenacity and ferocity of desperation—more often than not at close quarters with bayonets and rifle butts. They fought the entire day and into the evening but to no avail. The last fortifications, Battery Buchanan and the Mound, gave up at about 2200 hours (10 p.m.) that evening. The Navy had closed the eastern portion of the Confederacy's last avenue of contact with the outside world.

=== North Atlantic blockade operations ===
Advance resumed duty on the blockade. With the last deep-draft Confederate port closed, few runners tried to make the run. Those that did were of very shallow draft and of even more limited cargo capacity than that characteristic of their deep-draft predecessors. That fact made blockade running a highly unprofitable venture considering the danger involved. As a consequence, Advance participated in no captures.

Instead, she served as a dispatch and supply ship for the remainder of her tour of duty with the North Atlantic Blockading Squadron.

=== End-of-war activity ===
On 11 February, she put into Norfolk for a month of repairs before embarking passengers and sailing for New York City on 13 March. She reached that port the following day and entered the New York Navy Yard. On 16 March 1865, Advance was detached from the North Atlantic Blockading Squadron and was placed out of commission at New York City. She remained inactive for about three months during which time hostilities were coming to an end. On 22 April, almost a fortnight after General Robert E. Lee surrendered the Army of Northern Virginia, Advance was renamed USS Frolic, the second U.S. Navy ship of that name. On 12 June 1865, she was recommissioned under her new name, Lt. Comdr. John H. Upshur again in command.

== Post-war operations as USS Frolic ==
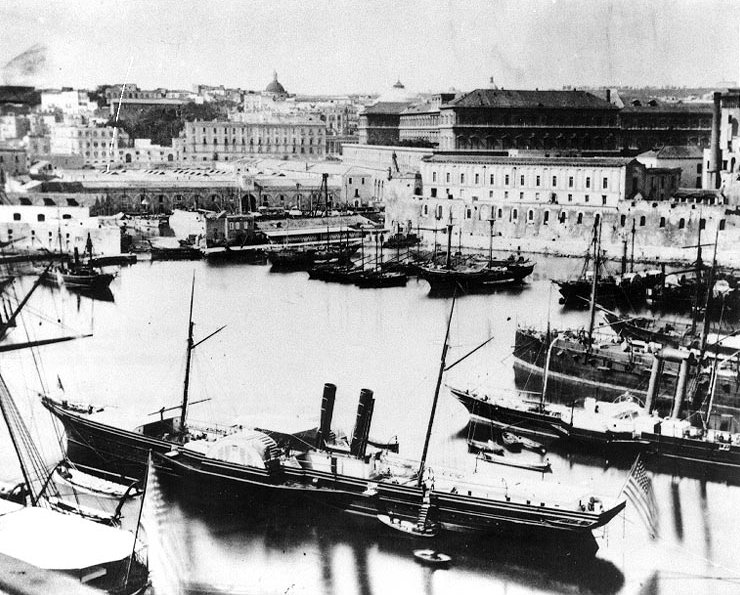
USS Frolic (formerly USS Advance) at Naples, Italy, ca. 1865–69

On 24 June 1865, Frolic departed the east coast to join the newly formed European Squadron and arrived at Flushing in the Netherlands on 17 July. Over the next four years, she made ceremonial visits to ports in Europe including many on the Mediterranean littoral. Those events reached a particularly high frequency during 1867 and 1868 when David Glasgow Farragut commanded the squadron. On 22 March 1869, the ship departed Lisbon, Portugal, to return to the United States. She arrived in New York City on 30 April and was placed out of commission there on 8 May 1869.

== 1869 recommissioning ==
Recommissioned on 24 September 1869, Frolic patrolled the fishing grounds off Nova Scotia between April and October 1870. She arrived at Washington, D.C., on 26 October 1870 and was decommissioned there on 11 November for repairs. On 18 January 1872, she was recommissioned at Washington, Lt. Comdr. G. C. Remey in command. On 19 February, Frolic departed Washington, D.C., to relieve USS Tallapoosa on patrol off the New England coast. She concluded that assignment in May and returned to Washington on the 24th.

Between 12 and 16 June 1872, she made the passage between Washington, D.C. and New York City. At the latter port, she became station ship and, on the 29th, broke the flag of Vice Admiral Stephen C. Rowan. She served alternately as station ship at New York and on patrols at sea until 30 April 1874 at which time she was decommissioned at Philadelphia for repairs. Recommissioned on 18 August 1875, Frolic departed Philadelphia for duty on the South Atlantic Station a week later. She cruised the coasts of Argentina, Uruguay and Brazil for a little over two years. While at Montevideo on 20 April 1877, Second Class Fireman James M. Trout attempted to rescue a shipmate from drowning, for which he was awarded the Medal of Honor.

== Final decommissioning ==
She returned to Washington, D.C., on 20 October 1877 and was decommissioned there for the last time on 31 October 1877. Frolic remained at Washington, in ordinary, until sold to Mr. J. P. Agnew, of Alexandria, Virginia, on 1 October 1883.

== See also ==
- Blockade runners of the American Civil War
- Ships captured in the American Civil War
- Union Navy
- Confederate Navy
- Bibliography of American Civil War naval history
