= USS Osceola (1863) =

Gunboat of the United States Navy

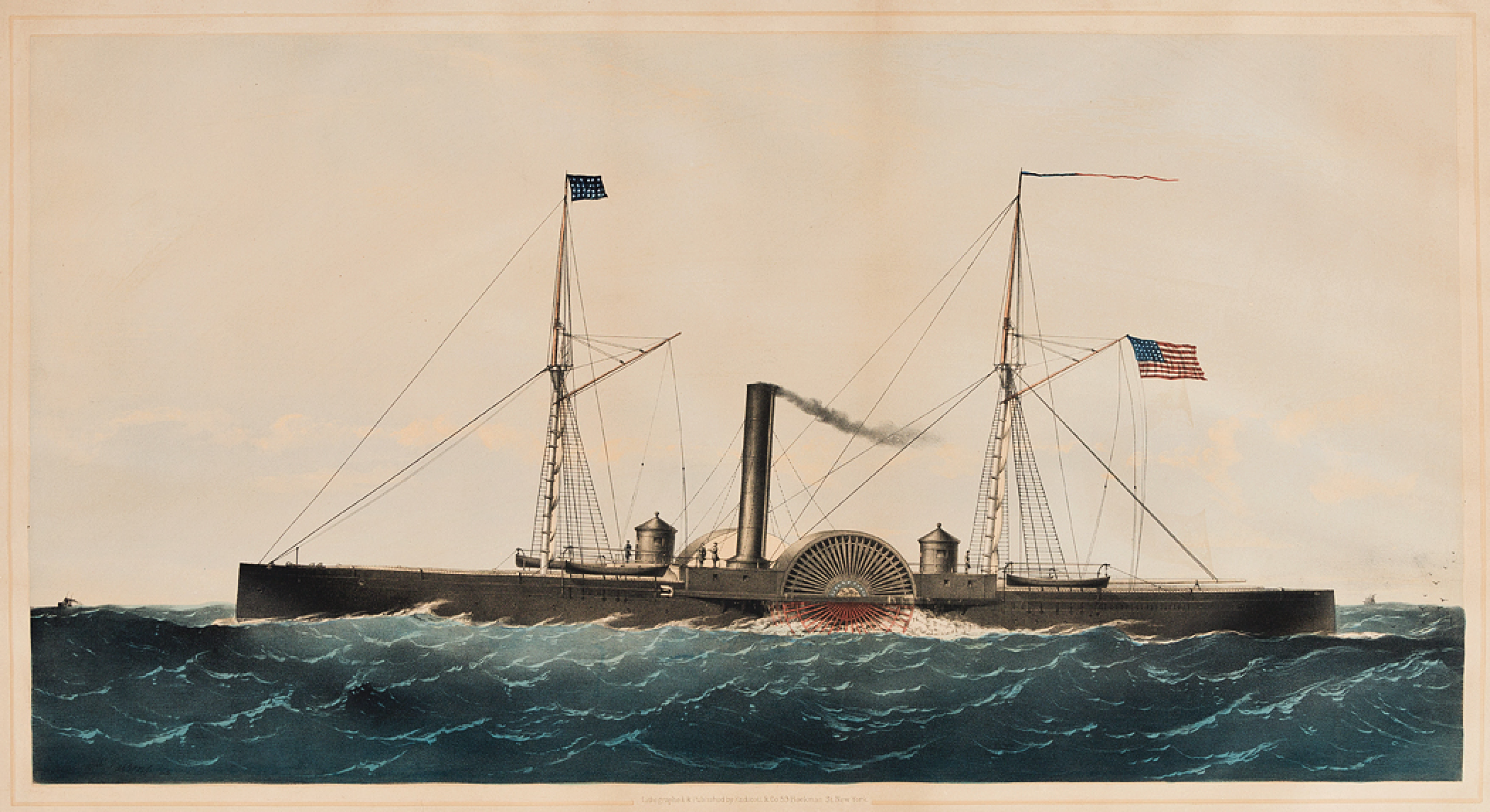
- Sassacus-class gunboat

History

United States
- Name: USS Osceola
- Namesake: Osceola (1804-1838), a noted Seminole chief
- Builder: Curtis and Tilden, Boston, Massachusetts
- Launched: 29 May 1863
- Commissioned: 10 February 1864
- Recommissioned: 16 January 1867
- Decommissioned: 13 May 1865
- Fate: Sold 1 October 1867

Uruguay
- Name: Eliza
- Owner: Flint & Hall
- Cost: $22,000
- Fate: Abandoned adrift in the Atlantic 1868

General characteristics as originally built
- Class & type: Sassacus-class gunboat
- Tonnage: 974
- Length: 205 ft 0 in (62.48 m)
- Beam: 35 ft 0 in (10.67 m)
- Draft: 8 ft 8.5 in (2.654 m)
- Depth: 11 ft 6 in (3.51 m)
- Propulsion: Steam
- Speed: 15 knots (28 km/h)
- Armament: 2 × 100-pounder Parrott rifles; 4 × 9-inch (229 mm) Dahlgren smoothbore guns; 1 × heavy 12-pounder smoothbore gun; 1 × 12-pounder gun; 1 × 24-pounder gun

USS Osceola was a wooden, sidewheel Sassacus-class gunboat which saw combat with the Union Navy in the American Civil War. She was designed with shallow draft and double-ends specifically to allow her to operate in the narrow rivers and inlets along the Confederate coast. She was well suited to this role and took part in major battles on the James and Cape Fear Rivers.

After her military service she was converted to a four-masted schooner to carry lumber between St. John, New Brunswick, and Montevideo, Uruguay. She was unsuited to this role and was disabled and abandoned on her first sailing.

== Construction and commissioning ==
One of the Union Navy's principal duties during the Civil War was to blockade the Confederacy's ports, hurting its economy and denying it manufactured goods, particularly arms, from overseas. A challenge with this assignment was that the coast of the Confederacy had a myriad of small, shallow, rivers and bays, many of which might harbor a blockade runner. To address this challenge, the Navy built a series of fast, shallow-draft classes of gunboats. Several of these were double ended, with a bow at each end, since it was anticipated that some rivers would be too narrow to allow the ship to turn around. Osceola was one of the 28 ships of her class, all built to approximately the same design.

Osceola was the third vessel built under contract for the Navy at the shipyard of John J. Curtis and Edward F. Tilden in East Boston. The contract was awarded on 15 October 1862. She was a sister ship to USS Massasoit, built earlier at the same facility. Osceola was launched on 23 May 1863. She was christened by Miss Minnie Moore, daughter of Captain Thomas Moore, who was killed when USS Congress was sunk in 1862.

The ship was 205 feet (62 m) long, with a beam of 35 feet (11 m), and a fully loaded draft of 8 feet 8.5 inches (2.654 m). Her depth of hold was 11 feet 6 inches (3.51 m). She displaced 974 tons. She was initially armed with nine guns, two 110-pounder Parrott rifles, four nine-inch Dahlgren smoothbore, one 12-pounder smoothbore, one 12-pounder rifled gun, and one 24-pounder. Her armament was changed several times during her career.

In October 1862 the Navy entered into contracts with the Atlantic Works of Boston for Osceola's engines, boilers, and related machinery. The original contract price for this work was $82,000. This equipment required significantly more material than originally estimated by the Navy, and Congress subsequently awarded an additional $20,513.73 to the Atlantic Works. The ship had two coal-fired boilers which powered a single steam engine. The engine had a single cylinder with a diameter of 58 inches (150 cm) and a stroke of 8 feet 9 inches (2.67 m). Oceola's maximum speed with this power plant was 15 knots.

The ship's crew consisted of 145 men, including 19 officers and 126 enlisted.

The ship's namesake was Osceola (1804–1838), a noted Seminole chief and leader during the Second Seminole War (1835–1842).

Various changes in Navy priorities delayed the final completion of the ship until November 1863. In mid-December 1863 she successfully completed a three-day trial of her steam plant. She was delivered to the U.S. Navy at the Boston Navy Yard on 9 January 1864 and commissioned there on 10 February 1864 with Commander John M. B. Clitz in command. She completed a sea trial on 24 March 1864.

== U.S. Navy service (1864–1867) ==
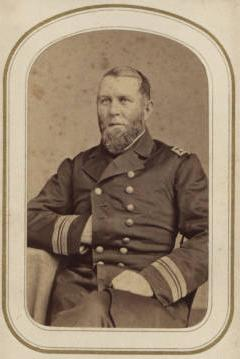
John M. B. Clitz as a lieutenant commander, prior to taking command of Osceola, c. 1860

Osceola departed Boston on 22 April 1864, towing the monitor USS Canonicus, and reached New York on 25 April 1864. The ship arrived at Hampton Roads, Virginia, on 3 May 1864. She was assigned to the North Atlantic Blockading Squadron. On the night of 4 May 1864, a Union fleet including Osceola sailed up Virginia's James River in support of General Ulysses S. Grant's Overland Campaign. She spent most of the next four months in and around the James River.

In July 1864 Osceola was at City Point guarding a flotilla of Union transports including four small ordinance vessels, a small provisions vessel, and the Navy's colliers.

On 4 August 1864 Osceola and USS Miami shelled a Confederate battery which was firing on Union transports near Harrison's Landing, Virginia. She expended 83 shells in this engagement. During the shelling, the elevating screws on two of her guns broke. The ship was ordered to Norfolk Navy Yard for repairs on 6 August 1864 and was reported there on 1 October 1864. While in the shipyard she was refit for blockade duty on the open ocean.

Osceola left the shipyard in early October and transported Rear Admiral David Porter, his wife, Captain Fraley, his wife, and Captain James Alden from Hampton Roads to City Point. Captain Clitz organized target practice, and the admiral fired off the 100-pounder Parrott rifle. His party went ashore at City Point, with Captain Clitz, to meet with Generals Grant and Meade. Afterwards, Osceola sailed to Fortress Monroe.

The ship sailed from Fortress Monroe to Beaufort, North Carolina. Osceola began blockade duty off Wilmington, North Carolina on 30 October 1864. She was not notably successful in this role and several blockade runners slipped past her.

In December 1864 the ship was assigned to support Admiral Porter's assault on Fort Fisher, which guarded the Cape Fear River approach to Wilmington. The naval bombardment of the fort, in which Osceola participated, began on 24 December 1864. The ship was hit below the waterline by an 11-inch solid shot which pierced her starboard boiler. Within ten minutes there was 4 feet (1.2 m) of water in the hold and the ship was in danger of foundering. While Captain Clitz was able to stop the leak, the ship was disabled and had to be towed out of range of the battle by USS Advance. Six of her crew were scalded by escaping steam. During this first assault, naval gunfire silenced Fort Fisher's artillery, but the landing force was unable to take the bastion and was withdrawn on 25 December 1864. Porter's fleet sailed back to Fortress Monroe to resupply.

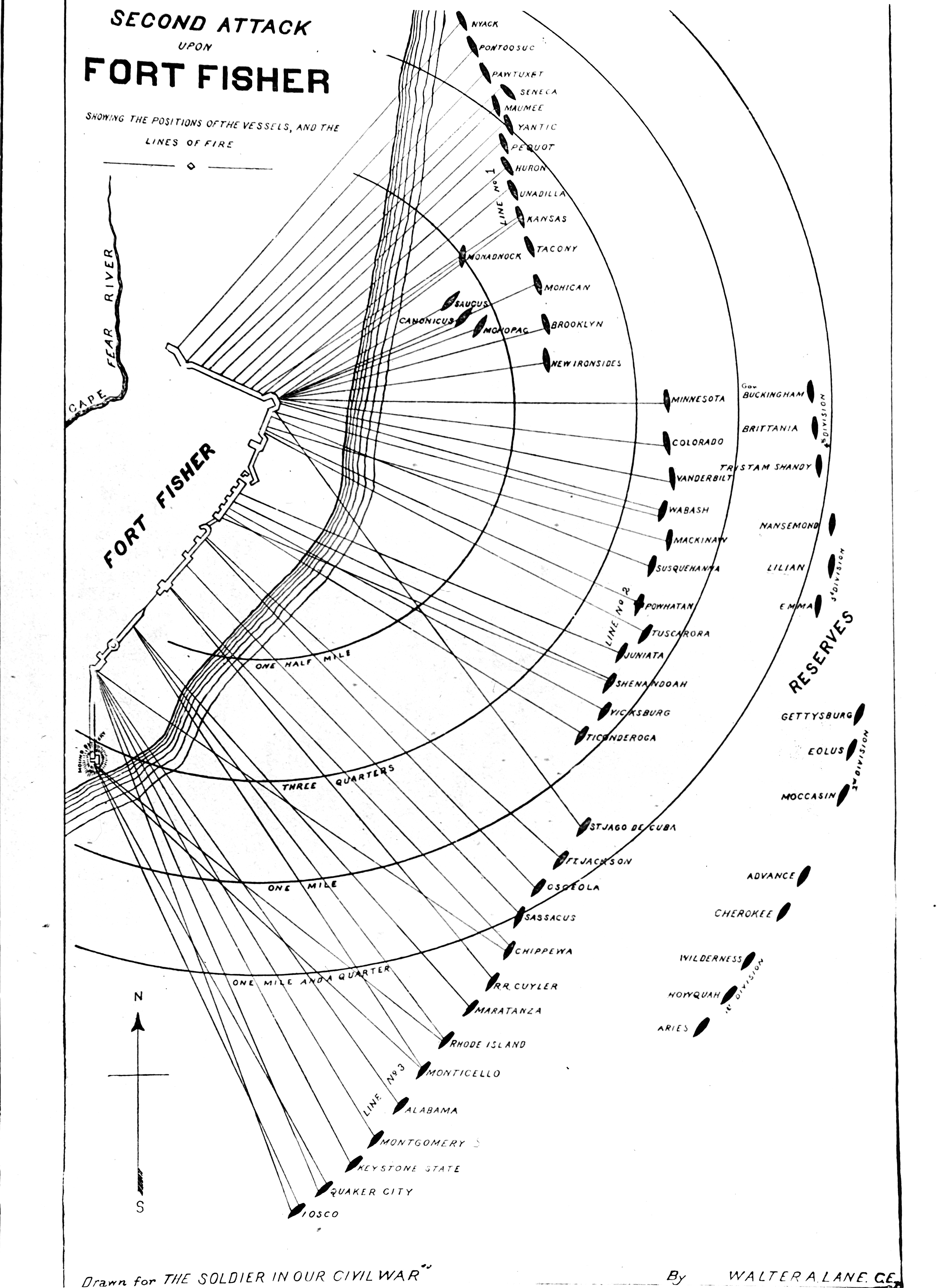
The bombardment of Fort Fisher, showing the location of Osceola on 14 January 1865

Porter immediately began work on a new invasion plan, this time with a different army general. Porter's fleet got underway from Fortress Monroe on January 12, 1865. By 11 pm on 13 January 1865, the fleet was once again anchored off Fort Fisher. The bombardment of shore facilities, in which Osceola participated, began at dawn on the 14th. She was the third ship in "line of battle No. 3", which shelled the southeast face of Fort Fisher. On 15 January 1865, the army landed troops to the north of the fort, and Osceola's division provided a creeping bombardment in front of them as they advanced to the south. Fort Fisher was taken but the victory was hard-fought; Osceola suffered three men wounded badly enough to be admitted to hospital.

Osceola remained in the Cape Fear River after the fall of Fort Fisher. Three of her sailors were captured by the Confederates while ashore cutting timber for new docks on 5 February 1865. Osceola supported the capture of Fort Anderson, further upstream From Fort Fisher, by bombarding it on 18 February 1865. Immediately after that fight, Porter's gunboats, including Osceola, pushed further up the river and bombarded Fort Strong. On 20 February 1865 Confederate troops sent 200 floating mines down the Cape Fear River. Most were detonated by musket fire from picket boats, but one hit Osceola's paddle-wheel and exploded. The paddle-wheel itself was demolished and there was some damage to bulkheads, but her hull was undamaged.

The ship returned to the Boston Navy Yard from Hampton Roads on 8 May 1865. There, she went into drydock for repairs. Having commissioned, fought, and returned his gunboat to the shipyard, Commander Clitz was detached from Osceola on 12 May 1865 and the ship was decommissioned the next day. With the end of the Civil War, Osceola remained largely idle. In October 1865 she sailed from the Boston Navy Yard to Portland in order to tow the monitor USS Wassuc back to Boston. In 1866 she made two roundtrips from Boston to New York.

On 16 January 1867 Osceola was recommissioned at the Boston Navy Yard, Commander James P. Foster in command. In early February she sailed to Aspinwall, Panama, arriving on 16 April 1867, and relieved USS Saco. Here she acted as a guardship for the many American vessels calling at the port. She left suddenly on 4 May 1867 and sailed to Cartagena, Colombia where she obtained the release of ten American sailors who had been seized by Colombian naval authorities. On her return to Aspinwall, she stopped at Curaçao for coal. Heavy seas damaged her paddle-wheels, and she remained at Curaçao until 1 August 1867. At that point she was ordered back to the United States. The ship had not performed well on this cruise. She experienced multiple mechanical breakdowns and with her light draft and flat bottom, designed for narrow river channels, she rolled excessively in ocean swells. On her return to the Brooklyn Navy Yard, she was decommissioned. On 1 October 1867 Osceola was sold at auction for $16,000 to Nehemiah Gibson of Boston.

== Commercial service (1867–1868) ==
Gibson contracted with Boston merchants Flint & Hall on 4 March 1868 to convert Osceola into a four-masted schooner to haul timber between St. John, New Brunswick and Montevideo, Uruguay. Flint & Hall bought the converted ship from Gibson for $22,000. Her new owners registered her as an Uruguayan vessel and renamed her Eliza.

Eliza left St John for Montevideo on 28 July 1868 with a load of lumber. In early August 1868 she encountered a gale. Eliza lost her foremast and rudder in the storm. She was completely disabled and on 10 August 1868 her mate and three men left the ship in a boat to seek help at Halifax. After a week in the open boat, the men were rescued by a passing vessel. Meanwhile, Eliza continued to drift out of control in the Atlantic. On 6 September 1868, after almost a month adrift, Eliza's captain and remaining crew were rescued by a passing ship. Eliza, now waterlogged and still out of control, was abandoned. The shipwrecked mariners were returned to Boston on 30 September 1868.
