= USS Upshur (DD-144) =

Wickes-class destroyer of the US Navy

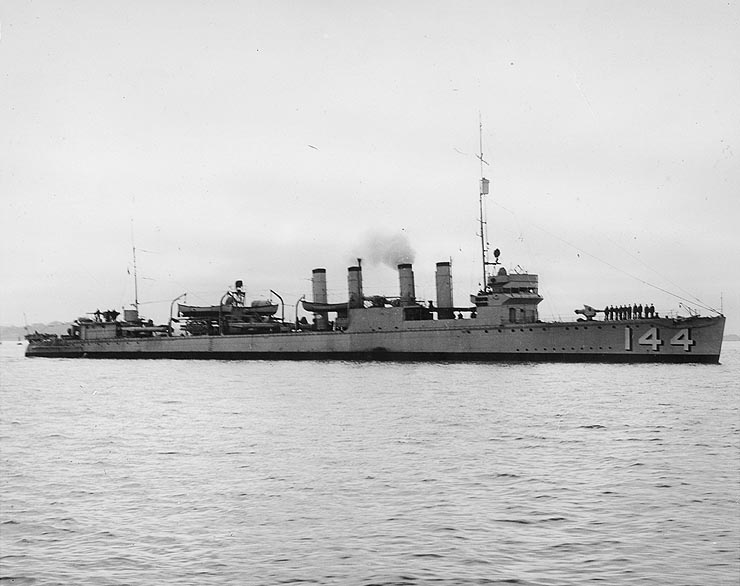
- USS Upshur circa 1940-1941

History

United States
- Name: Upshur
- Namesake: John Henry Upshur
- Builder: William Cramp & Sons, Philadelphia
- Yard number: 459
- Laid down: 19 February 1918
- Launched: 4 July 1918
- Commissioned: 23 December 1918
- Decommissioned: 15 May 1922
- Identification: DD-144
- Recommissioned: 2 June 1930
- Decommissioned: 22 December 1936
- Recommissioned: 4 October 1939
- Decommissioned: 2 November 1945
- Reclassified: AG-103, on 3 June 1945
- Stricken: 11 November 1945
- Fate: Sold on 26 September 1947; scrapped by April 1948

General characteristics
- Class & type: Wickes-class destroyer
- Displacement: 1,247 tons
- Length: 314 ft 4 1/2 in (95.8 m)
- Beam: 30 ft 11 1/4 in (9.4 m)
- Draft: 9 ft 1/2 in (2.8 m)
- Speed: 35 knots (65 km/h)
- Complement: 113 officers and enlisted
- Armament: 4 × 4 in (102 mm) guns; 2 × .30 cal. machine guns; 12 × 21 in (533 mm) torpedo tubes

USS Upshur (DD–144) was a Wickes-class destroyer in the United States Navy before and during World War II. She was the first ship named for Rear Admiral John Henry Upshur.

Upshur was laid down on 19 February 1918 at Philadelphia by William Cramp & Sons' shipyards. The ship is launched on 4 July 1918, sponsored by Mrs. Alexander Gustavus Brown, the granddaughter of Rear Admiral Upshur. The destroyer commissioned at the Philadelphia Navy Yard on 23 December 1918.

== Service history ==
=== 1919–1922 ===
Following shakedown and fitting out, Upshur departed Newport, Rhode Island, on 20 May 1919, bound via the Azores for north European waters. She arrived at Devonport, England, on 16 June and shifted to Harwich two days later before subsequently calling at Heligoland, Germany; Copenhagen, Denmark; and the free city of Danzig. She eventually returned, via Harwich and Ponta Delgada, to the United States, arriving at New York City on 22 July.

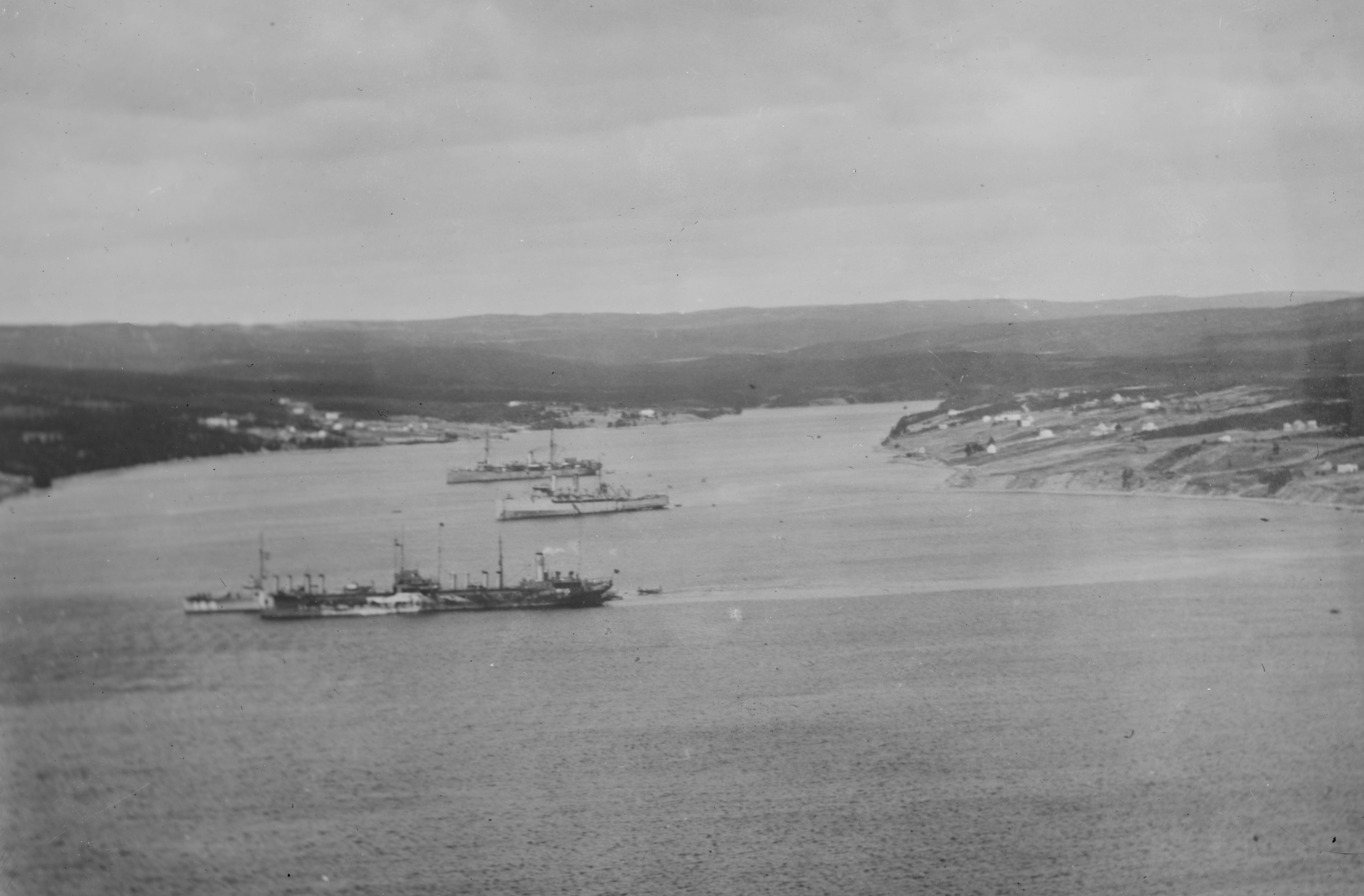
USS Upshur at Trepassey Bay in 1919

Assigned to the Pacific Fleet soon thereafter, Upshur transited the Panama Canal, bound for San Diego, her base of operations until the spring of the following year. During her time at San Diego, the ship conducted gunnery and torpedo training and local coastal operations. In April 1920, Upshur got underway and proceeded via Honolulu, Pearl Harbor, Midway, and Guam to the Far East, arriving at Cavite, in the Philippines, on 20 May. She soon sailed for duty on the lower Yangtze River as part of the Yangtze River Patrol.

At Yueyang on 16 June, troops of warlord Zhang Jingyao executed American missionary, William A. Reimert. At Hankou when the incident occurred, Upshur, acting under urgent orders, got underway for the trouble spot on 22 June—departing with such great haste that four of her complement (one officer and three enlisted men) were left behind. Arriving at Yueyang on 23 June, Upshur sent ashore a landing party of one officer and 40 men at 1805 on 25 June to protect the American mission. Two days later—when local tensions had eased—they were reembarked.

The Standard Oil Company's steamer Mei Foo arrived at Yueyang on 28 June and delivered 100 bags of rice for refugees in the vicinity. Over the ensuing days, Upshur delivered that food staple to the American mission. In the meantime, the Commander in Chief, Asiatic Fleet, Admiral Albert Cleaves, arrived at Yueyang in Elliot to observe the local situation. Eventually, the offending Chinese official in charge, Zhang Jingyao, was removed, and the Chinese foreign office, while investigating the incident, expressed its profound regrets.

Upshur remained on the Yangtze until 9 July, when she resumed routine operations—target practices and torpedo drills. For her tour on the river, the destroyer received commendation in the Secretary of the Navy's annual report, noted as being "especially serviceable in establishing radio communication along the river."

Upshur conducted exercises in the Philippine Islands in the winter and in Chinese waters, off Yantai, in the summer, with more training and "showing the flag" cruises in between. During her tour in the Asiatic Fleet, Upshur was reclassified DD-144 on 17 July 1920. After completing her assignment in the Far East early in 1922, the destroyer arrived back on the west coast in the spring and was decommissioned at San Diego on 15 May 1922 and placed in reserve.

=== 1923–1941 ===
Recommissioned on 2 June 1930, Upshur operated with the Battle Fleet and Scouting Force, first on the west coast and later on the east, until decommissioned on 22 December 1936 at Philadelphia. She was berthed in the Philadelphia Navy Yard until the autumn of 1939.

Soon after the outbreak of World War II in Poland in September 1939, President Roosevelt declared the neutrality of the United States and ordered the establishment of a Neutrality Patrol off the eastern seaboard and gulf coast on 5 September. To augment the ships first assigned to this duty, the Navy began reactivation of 77 light minelayers and destroyers. Accordingly, Upshur went back into commission at Philadelphia on 4 October, a little over a month after Germany invaded Poland. Attached to the Atlantic Squadron of the United States Fleet, Upshur interspersed her routine training evolutions—battle practices, torpedo exercises, and tactical maneuvers—with patrols safeguarding America's neutral shores along the Atlantic and gulf coasts.

Upshur's routine was broken briefly in December 1939. On 13 December, the North German Norddeutscher Lloyd steamship Columbus slipped out of Veracruz, Mexico, in an attempt to reach Germany and slip through the British blockade. She had not reckoned with the Neutrality Patrol, however, that persistently shadowed the liner from the moment she stood out of the Mexican port. Upshur participated in the tracking and reporting of the steamer, the 13th largest merchant steamship in the world. Columbus ultimately met her doom on 19 December; she was scuttled when confronted by British destroyer Hyperion. The cruiser Tuscaloosa, standing nearby, rescued the Columbus crew.

The rapid fall of France in early 1940 caused alarm in the western hemisphere that French possessions in the West Indies might fall into German hands. American planners drew up contingency plans to take these isles by force if necessary. In the event of such an invasion, Upshur and her sisters in Destroyer Squadron 30 were slated to screen the counter-battery and gunfire support group built around Texas, Vincennes, and Chester. The crisis abated by late 1940.

In between the routine neutrality patrol assignments and training, Upshur was called upon to perform a special escort mission. On 23 December 1940, the heavy cruiser Tuscaloosa departed Norfolk with William D. Leahy, Ambassador to Vichy France, and his wife, embarked, bound for Lisbon, Portugal. Upshur and Madison escorted the heavy cruiser, until they were detached on Christmas Day to return to Norfolk while the cruiser proceeded on, unescorted, on her diplomatic mission.

In March 1941, the Support Force was established for the United States Fleet, under the command of Rear Admiral Arthur L. Bristol. Based at Narragansett Bay, this group prepared for assignment to "distant seas" and was formed around Denebola, Albemarle, Belknap, and George E. Badger. Four patrol plane squadrons and three destroyer squadrons—the last including Upshur—rounded out the Support Force.

Over the ensuing months, Upshur operated alternately out of Naval Station Argentia, Newfoundland; Newport, Rhode Island; Philadelphia; Narragansett Bay; Boston; and Reykjavík, Iceland, after its occupation by the United States that summer. On 11 September, the destroyer departed Argentia, bound for a rendezvous with an outward-bound convoy headed for the British Isles.

Five days later HX 150, a convoy of 50 merchantmen of British and Allied nationalities put to sea from Halifax, Nova Scotia, escorted locally by Canadian units. On 17 September, about 150 miles (240 km) out of Argentia, the American escort group under Captain Morton L. Deyo, which included Upshur, met up with the British convoy. The ensuing days witnessed the five American destroyers shepherding the convoy towards the "Mid-Ocean Meeting Point" (MOMP). Upshur steamed on the port side of the convoy, 500 to 2,000 yards (460 to 1,830 m) out, searching with her sound equipment on a 30-degree sector during the day, and patrolling 500 to 1,000 yards (460 to 910 m) out at night. The Americans brought the convoy safely to the MOMP, where British ships— two destroyers and four corvettes—picked up the England-bound ships. The five American destroyers then convoyed the Iceland-bound section of the convoy to Reykjavík. This convoy was the first one assisted by the United States Navy in the Battle of the Atlantic.

This mission proved to be only the beginning of American escort operations prior to the formal entry of the United States into World War II, as ships of the Support Force escorted 14 convoys between 16 September and 30 October. As the months wore on, clashes of American warships with German submarines grew in frequency and intensity. Kearny was damaged by a German torpedo on 17 October, and Salinas suffered a similar fate on the 30th. The next day, Reuben James was sunk by the German submarine U-552. Over the ensuing period from 1 November to 7 December 1941, Support Force destroyers conducted seven round-trip convoy missions in shepherding 14 convoys consisting of some 550 ships across the North Atlantic.

=== World War II ===
In the period following full-scale American entry into the war with the Japanese attack on Pearl Harbor on 7 December 1941 and until the middle of February 1942, Support Force destroyers escorted a dozen convoys in each direction across the Atlantic—750 ships—in comparative safety.

On the night of 4 February 1942, Upshur departed Londonderry Port, Northern Ireland, in company with Gleaves, Dallas, Roper, and the United States Coast Guard Treasury-class cutter USCGC Ingham. Throughout the day on 5 February, the ships hunted a U-boat whose intentions seemed to be to follow the Americans to their outbound convoy assignment. Seven times the destroyers and the Coast Guard cutter attacked the submarine, dropping 30 depth charges, but could not "kill" the elusive submersible.

After rendezvousing with Convoy ON 63 on the morning of 7 February, the escorts shaped a course southwest with the 30 merchant vessels, shepherding them along in the wintry seas. Upshur's lookouts spotted a U-boat running on the surface two miles (3 km) away and gave chase, but the German lookouts were alert, and the submarine submerged before Upshur could attack.

For two hours, Upshur and Ingham scoured the area, dropping 15 depth charges before they returned to their stations. Upshur had no sooner returned to station when she again spotted the U-boat 8,000 yards (7,300 m) away. Accelerating to flank speed, the flush-decker headed towards the enemy, only to have the U-boat submerge out of sight once more. Upshur fired two rounds from her forward 3-inch (76 mm) gun—both shells splashing around the enemy's disappearing conning tower. Gleaves soon arrived on the scene and assisted Upshur in searching for the U-boat. Neither ship was able to make contact with the enemy that day nor the next, but they succeeded in preventing the German submersible from making contact with the convoy and managed to bring all of their charges safely into port.

Over the ensuing two years, Upshur operated on convoy escort missions with the Atlantic Fleet. Her duties took her from the eastern seaboard of the United States to the mouth of the Mediterranean Sea, from the inhospitable climes of the North Atlantic to the tropical Caribbean.

=== Convoys escorted ===
Convoy	Escort Group	Dates	Notes
	task force 19	1–7 July 1941	occupation of Iceland prior to US declaration of war
HX 150		17-25 Sept 1941	from Newfoundland to Iceland prior to US declaration of war
ON 22		7-15 Oct 1941	from Iceland to Newfoundland prior to US declaration of war
HX 157		30 Oct-8 Nov 1941	from Newfoundland to Iceland prior to US declaration of war
ON 35		15-27 Nov 1941	from Iceland to Newfoundland prior to US declaration of war
HX 164		10-19 Dec 1941	from Newfoundland to Iceland
ON 49		27 Dec 1941-5 Jan 1942	from Iceland to Newfoundland
HX 171		22-30 Jan 1942	from Newfoundland to Iceland
ON 63		7-13 Feb 1942	from Iceland to Newfoundland
		July-Oct 1942	Trinidad-Guantanamo-Key West convoys
SC 122		12–16 March 1943	battle reinforcement from Iceland
UC 2		9–23 April 1943	from Liverpool to Curacao

== Auxiliary service ==
As the Allies slowly gained the upper hand in the Battle of the Atlantic, newer and more modern destroyers replaced the aging flush-deckers as front line convoy escorts. Throughout 1944, Upshur operated between Norfolk, Virginia, and Quonset Point, Rhode Island, serving as plane guard and target vessel during qualification trials for aircraft carriers. During this period, she worked successively with Kasaan Bay, Ranger, Mission Bay, Tulagi, Tripoli, Wake Island, Prince William, and Solomons. Reclassified as a miscellaneous auxiliary, AG-103 on 3 June 1945, Upshur was plane-guarding for Lake Champlain when Japan capitulated on 15 August, ending the war in the Pacific. Decommissioned at Norfolk, Virginia, on 2 November 1945, Upshur was struck from the Navy list on 11 November; was sold to the Northern Metals Company of Philadelphia on 26 September 1947; and was scrapped by April 1948.
