= Trout River =

Trout River may refer to:

Rivers in Canada:

- Trout River (British Columbia), a tributary of the Liard River
- Trout River (Northwest Territories), a tributary of the Mackenzie River
- Trout River (Quebec), a river in Quebec

Rivers in the United States:

- Trout River (Florida), a tributary of the St. Johns River
- Trout River (Iowa), a tributary of the Upper Iowa River
- Trout River (Michigan), flows into Lake Huron
- Trout River (Vermont), a tributary of the Missisquoi River

Places:

- Trout River, Newfoundland and Labrador, a village in Canada
- Trout River, New York, a hamlet in the United States

== See also ==
- Salmon Trout River
- Trout River Brewing
- Trout River Bridge
- Trout Run (disambiguation)
