= Trout Brook (Ramsey County, Minnesota) =

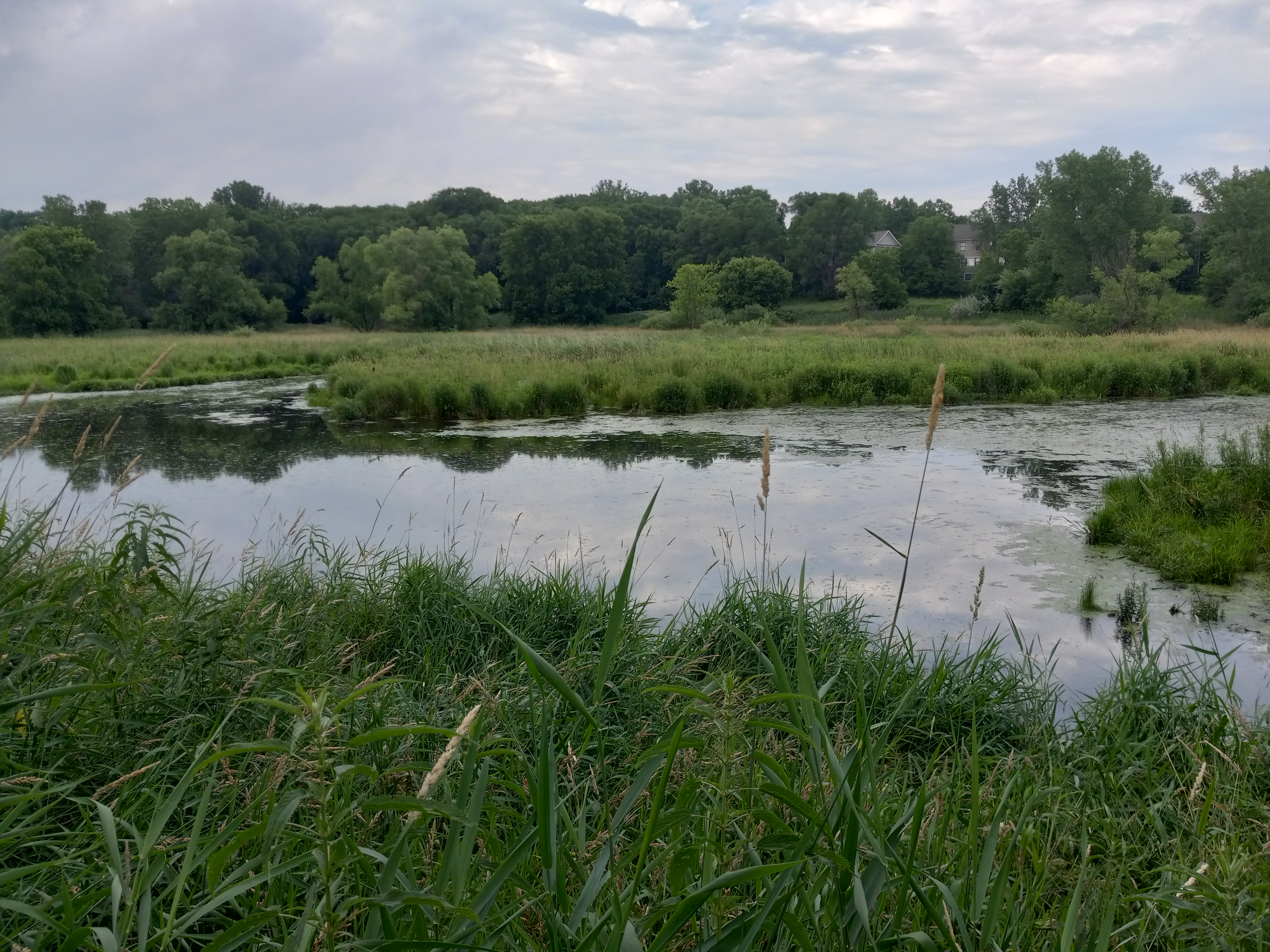

- Mouth of the Trout Brook

Location
- Country: United States
- State: Minnesota
- County: Ramsey County

Physical characteristics
- Source
  - coordinates: 44.9961111°N 93.1030556°W
- Mouth
  - coordinates: 44.9849656°N 93.0974416°W

Trout Brook is a stream in Ramsey County, in the U.S. state of Minnesota. It source is at McCarrons Lake.

== Nature Sanctuary ==
The Trout Brook Nature Sanctuary is part of the Trout Brook Greenway and is located on a 42-acre site west of I-35E between Norpac Rd. and Cayuga Ave.

Trout Brook was buried during development in St. Paul and later unearthed and routed as a stream.

Trout Brook in St. Paul, Ramsey County, Minnesota

There are also Trout Brooks in Pine, Dakota, Wabasha, and Washington Counties, Minnesota.

== See also ==
- List of rivers of Minnesota
