= Miesville Ravine Park Reserve =

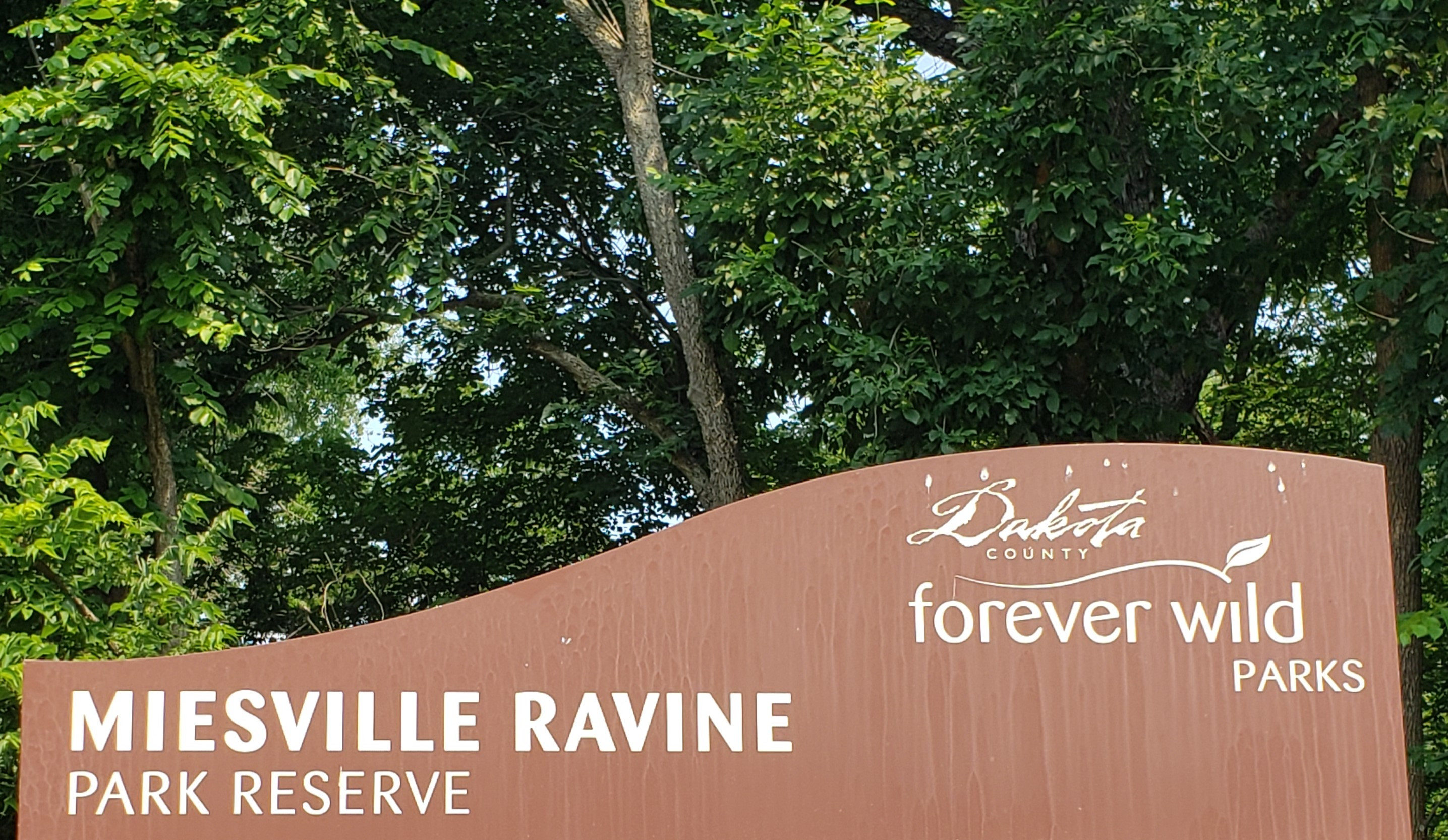
Sign at Miesville Park Reserve, Dakota County, Minnesota

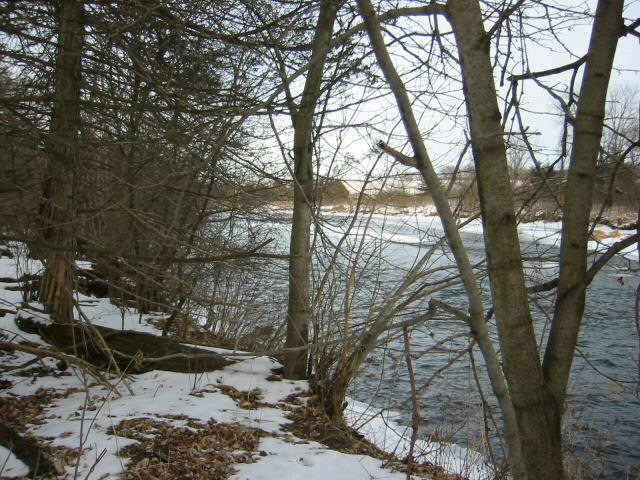
The Cannon River as seen from a snowshoe trail on a winter day

Miesville Ravine Park Reserve is a Dakota County park near the town of Miesville, Minnesota, United States. It preserves over 1,600 acres (6 km^{2}) of biologically diverse land in the Cannon River valley. Most of the park is wooded with mature oak, maple, cottonwood, willow, red cedar, and white pine. A trout stream, Trout Brook, is located in the reserve.

== Hiking trails ==
Year-round hiking trails within the reserve consist of more than two miles (3 km) total. There are 2.3 miles (3.7 km) of ungroomed trails for snowshoeing that offer scenic views of the valley floor and surrounding bluffs. There are two picnic shelters available on a first-come, first-served basis or are available for rent.

== Trout Brook ==
Trout Brook
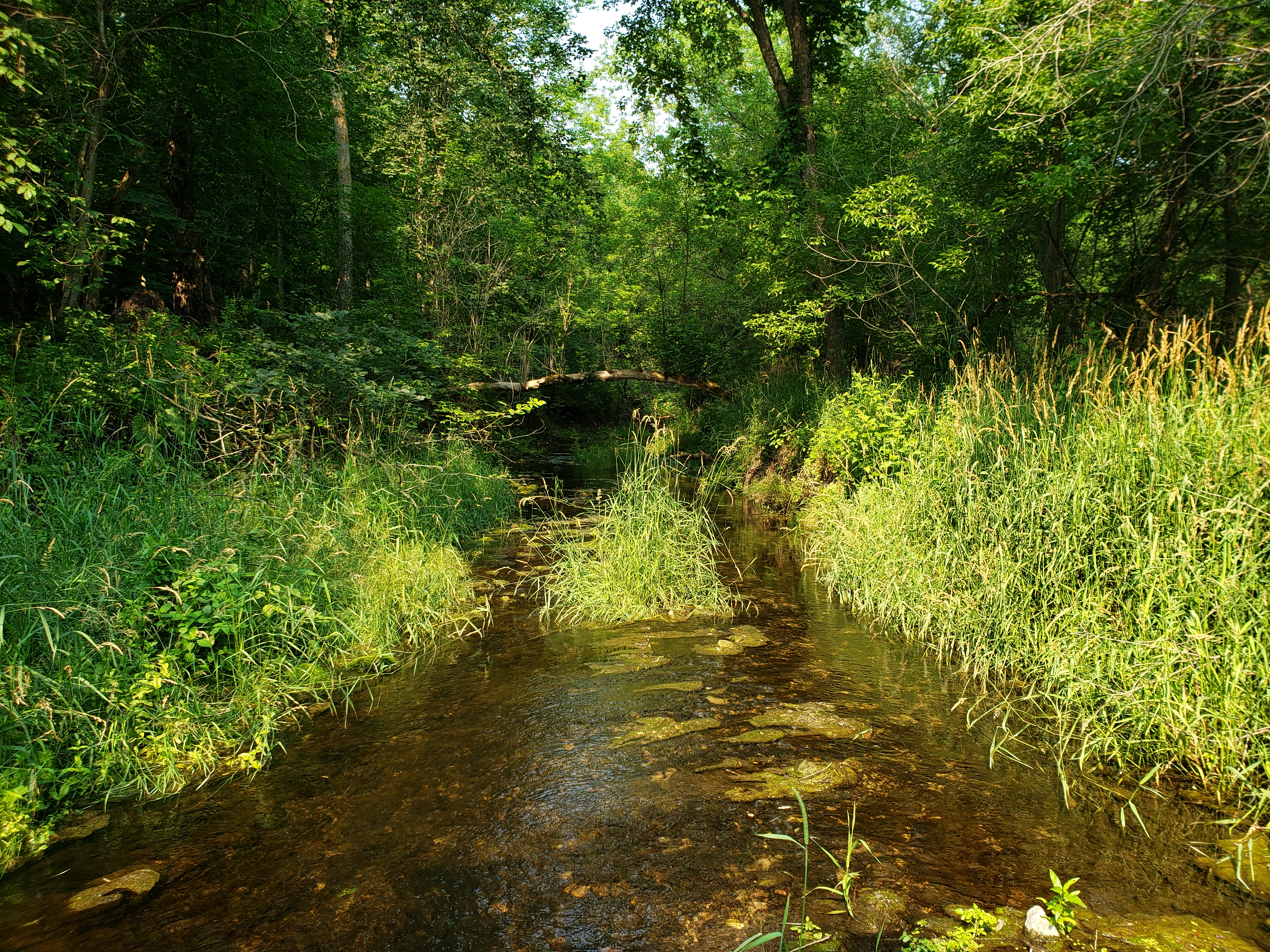

- Mouth of Trout Brook

Location
- Country: United States
- State: Minnesota
- County: Dakota

Physical characteristics
- Source
  - location: South of Miesville, Minnesota
  - coordinates: 44.56441098080472°N 92.84572423632376°W
- Mouth: Root River
  - location: Cannon River, upstream of Welch, in Miesville Ravine Park Reserve
  - coordinates: 44.54331002305036°N 92.8005518129206°W
- Length: 4.58 mi (7.37 km)

Basin features
- Progression: Trout Brook→ Cannon River→ Mississippi River→ Gulf of Mexico
- River system: Cannon River

Trout Brook is a 4.58 mi-long (7.37 km), small stream totally within this reserve in Dakota County. Trout Brook is in a karst landscape. Tributaries of Trout Brook include Weber Run and an East Branch and West Branch of Trout Run. Several springs have been identified that feed cold water to the stream. These springs have been monitored for several decades to monitor pollution. Trout Brook is a tributary of the Cannon River, which flows into the Mississippi River at Red Wing. The entire length of Trout Brook has been designated a trout stream by the Minnesota Department of Natural Resources. The stream contains Brook trout and brown trout.

Miesville Ravine Park Reserve in Dakota County, Minnesota
Trout Brook within Miesville Ravine Park Reserve in light green

There are also Trout Brooks in Pine, Ramsey, Wabasha, and Washington Counties, Minnesota.

== See also ==
- List of rivers of Minnesota
