= USS Hecla (1846) =

United States warship (1846–1848)

History

United States
- Name: USS Hecla
- Acquired: 1846
- Commissioned: 9 March 1847
- Decommissioned: 9 September 1848
- Fate: Sold shortly after decommissioning

General characteristics
- Type: Bomb brig
- Tonnage: 194 tons

The first USS Hecla was a bomb brig that served in the United States Navy from 1846 to 1848, seeing service in the Mexican War.

== Service history ==
Hecla was purchased at New York, New York, in 1846, and was commissioned there on 9 March 1847 with Lieutenant Archibald B. Fairfax in command.

On 10 March 1847, Hecla sailed for the Gulf of Mexico to support American actions during the Mexican War. She arrived off Isla de Sacrificios, near Veracruz, Mexico, on the morning of 29 March 1847, just in time to see Veracruz fall to American forces that evening.

From Veracruz, Hecla was dispatched with other ships of the American squadron to patrol the Gulf of Mexico along the Mexican coast, stopping and searching all ships encountered. On 18 April 1847, during this first patrol, she contributed 25 men and four officers to a successful amphibious expedition against the Mexican city of Tuxpan in the First Battle of Tuxpan. Her first patrol in the Gulf of Mexico ended on 24 April 1847 as she came to anchor off the Bar of Santander.

Hecla made three more similar patrols in the summer of 1847, frequently stopping at various Mexican ports and sending men ashore for water and provisions.

On 15 August 1847 Hecla shifted upriver to anchor in the harbor of Alvarado, where she served as a harbor patrol vessel until the end of the Mexican War. She was especially vigilant for small canoes attempting to smuggle illegal supplies and ammunition up the river, seizing several.

With the end of the war, Hecla sailed for the United States on 20 July 1848, arriving in Norfolk, Virginia, on 15 August 1848 and continuing to New York on 4 September 1848. She decommissioned there on 9 September 1848 and was sold shortly thereafter.
