= Ketil Trout =

Ketil Trout, known in Old Norse as Ketill hængr (Modern Icelandic Ketil Hæng), is the name of several figures from Norse folklore. Two are especially prominent:

- Ketil Trout of Hranista, or Ketil Trout of Halogaland, the hero of the legendary Hrafnistumannasögur sagas
- Ketil Trout (Iceland), or Ketil Trout of Namdalen, grandson of the above and a chieftain in early 10th century Iceland
