= Trout Run (retreat) =

Private and presidential retreat in Maryland

Coordinates: 39.586705°N 77.456658°W

Trout Run is a property in the Catoctin Mountains near Thurmont, Maryland, that was visited on several occasions by Presidents Herbert Hoover, Franklin Delano Roosevelt and Dwight Eisenhower. Originally called Catoctin Lodge, it is located about 4 mi (6.4 km) away from the presidential retreat at Camp David and was established by one of Hoover's senior aides. It subsequently became the property of the family of a senior State Department official, who owned it for nearly 70 years, before it was acquired in 2013 by an arm of the Church of Scientology. It became the focus of controversy in 2015 when the controversial Narconon drug rehabilitation program, an offshoot of Scientology, sought to turn it into a facility for treating drug addicts despite considerable local opposition.

== History ==
The site was originally owned by Lancelot Jacques, who invited President Herbert Hoover to fish in Little Hunting Creek in the 1920s. Jacques sold around 1,500 acres (610 ha) of the property in 1929 to Lawrence Richey, one of the two Secretaries to the President under Herbert Hoover (1929–1933). He constructed a main lodge, which he named Richey Lodge, and several cabins, one of which was later named after Hoover. The president visited several times to enjoy the trout fishing, which was said to be some of the best in the state. Franklin Delano Roosevelt and Dwight Eisenhower also visited, although none of the three presidents stayed there.

Of the original property, 453 acres (183 ha) were purchased in 1945 by Washington, D.C., Cadillac dealer Floyd Akers, who had previously leased it from Richey. Under Akers' ownership, several more stone cabins were built along with a stone pathway and ramps. He hosted a variety of celebrities, including Clark Gable, Claudette Colbert, Bette Davis and James Cagney.

It subsequently passed to his daughter Tomajean and her husband, the former high-ranking official Howard Haugerud. They owned the property for around 60 years; Howard Haugerud used it for nine years as the headquarters of the U.S. military newspaper Stars and Stripes, which he owned. However, plans to develop it fell through because the rocky terrain of the property made it impossible to install the extra septic systems needed.

Haugerud sought to sell the property for $20 million in 2003, putting it up for auction after failing to sell it through conventional channels. According to the property's caretaker for 30 years, Louise Barry, Haugerud exaggerated the property's historic importance in order to boost its sale value. A wooden bridge across the creek that bears a sign saying "FDR Bridge" was in fact built in the 1980s, while the ramps were built not for Roosevelt's wheelchair but for golf carts, years after the president's death. Haugerud decided to withdraw it from sale half an hour after the bidding was due to start and his realtors announced that he was considering whether to contest the 2004 United States Presidential Election as an independent: "If elected, he has promised to supply his own Camp David in the form of Trout Run at no expense to the government, thus insuring the savings of millions of dollars for the stressed out tax payers."

In 2004, Trout Run was used by the NBC television series The West Wing as a stand-in for Camp David. The latter is only about 4 mi (6.4 km) away, but has inferior trout fishing.

== Purchase by Church of Scientology ==
In 2013, the property – now reduced to 40 acres (16 ha) – was purchased for $4.85 million by a Delaware corporation, West Coast Property Investments Inc., which then turned Trout Run over to Social Betterment Properties International, a real estate arm of the Church of Scientology. SBPI submitted plans to convert Trout Run into a rehabilitation centre for drug addicts undergoing the controversial Narconon program devised by Scientology founder L. Ron Hubbard. Because of zoning restrictions, establishing such a facility at Trout Run would ordinarily be impossible, but using it as a group home would be permitted under local ordinances if the property was listed on the county's historic register. Narconon undertook an effort to get the property listed and hired a consultant to write a history of the site.

The takeover of Trout Run by Narconon prompted opposition from a variety of sources, including many people working in drug counselling who consider Narconon to be dangerous and ineffective. The local council was due to vote on the historic designation in April 2015 but postponed the decision in the face of mounting opposition. Opponents questioned whether the property qualified as an historic site (though the county's Historic Preservation Commission ruled that it was eligible) and highlighted the fact that Narconon was facing or had settled numerous lawsuits brought on behalf of addicts and their families, and had its licence in Georgia revoked. They also argued that adding extra septic tanks would pollute the creek and that the designation as an historic property would be incompatible with closing the site to public access.

The controversy was characterized by The Washington Post as a "culture war" over Scientology, with opponents reporting that they had been followed by suspected private investigators who they believed were working for Narconon. A "No Narconon at Trout Run" group was formed on Facebook and attracted 300 members, who coordinated objections to Narconon's plans and researched the property's history in a bid to thwart the proposed historic designation.

On June 1, 2015, the Frederick County Council voted by a 6–1 majority against designating the property, with several members saying that they were not convinced that it deserved the status. The decision left Narconon with the option of either appealing or waiting a year before filing a new application. The organization's attorney said that it remained convinced that it met the criteria for designation. It subsequently asked a court to review the council's decision. In response, the council's attorney said that it was well within their discretion to turn down the application for historic status, pointing out that the onus was on the applicant to convince the council of their case.
