= Trout Lake =

Trout Lake may refer to:

== Canada ==
- Trout Lake, Alberta, an unincorporated community

- Trout Lake Aerodrome, an aerodrome near Trout Lake, Alberta

- Trout Lake (British Columbia), a lake in the West Kootenay region
  - Trout Lake, British Columbia, a rural community and ghost town
- Sambaa K'e (lake), formerly Trout Lake, a lake in the Northwest Territories
  - Sambaa K'e, formerly Trout Lake, the community on this lake
  - Trout Lake Water Aerodrome, an aerodrome near Trout Lake / Sambaa K'e in Northwest Territories
- Trout Lake (Vancouver), British Columbia
- Trout Lake (Annapolis County, Nova Scotia)
- Trout Lake (Halifax Regional Municipality, Nova Scotia)
- Trout Lake (Ontario), bordering North Bay
- Trout Lake (Saskatchewan), a lake in Saskatchewan along the course of the Churchill River
- Big Trout Lake, Ontario

== United States ==
- Trout Lake (Colorado) near Telluride
- Trout Lake (Florida) on the border of Polk and Highlands Counties
- Trout Lake (Flathead County, Montana)
- Trout Lake in Ravalli County, Montana
- Trout Lake in Sweet Grass County, Montana
- Trout Lake (Arietta, Hamilton County, New York)
- Trout Lake (Morehouse, Hamilton County, New York), a lake of New York
- Trout Lake (Warren County, New York)
- Trout Lake (Pennsylvania)
- Trout Lake (CDP), Washington

- Trout Lake Airport, an airport near Trout Lake, Washington

- Trout Lake (King County, Washington)
- Trout Lake (Wisconsin)
- Trout Lake (Wyoming), in Yellowstone National Park
- Trout Lake Township, Michigan
  - Trout Lake, Michigan, an unincorporated community
- Trout Lake Township, Itasca County, Minnesota
