= James M. Trout =

United States Navy sailor

- Born: April 9, 1850; Philadelphia, Pennsylvania
- Died: July 27, 1910 (aged 60); Philadelphia, Pennsylvania
- Burial place: Fernwood Cemetery, Fernwood, Pennsylvania
- Military career
- Allegiance: United States
- Branch: United States Navy
- Rank: Second Class Fireman
- Unit: USS Frolic
- Awards: Medal of Honor

James M. Trout (April 9, 1850 – July 27, 1910) was a United States Navy sailor and a recipient of the United States military's highest decoration, the Medal of Honor.

Born on April 9, 1850, in Philadelphia, Pennsylvania, Trout joined the Navy from that state. By April 20, 1877, he was serving as a second class fireman on the USS Frolic. On that day, while Frolic was at Montevideo, Uruguay, he attempted to rescue a shipmate landsman named Peter Teubner from drowning. For this action, he was awarded the Medal of Honor. He died at age 60 on July 27, 1910, and was buried at Fernwood Cemetery in Fernwood, Delaware County, Pennsylvania.

Trout's official Medal of Honor citation reads:

Serving on board the U.S.S. Frolic, Trout displayed gallant conduct in endeavoring to save the life of one of the crew of that vessel who had fallen overboard at Montevideo, 20 April 1877.

== See also ==
- List of Medal of Honor recipients during peacetime
