= USS Trout =

Two submarines of the United States Navy have been named USS Trout for the trout fish:

- USS Trout (SS-202), a Tambor-class submarine, was lost during World War II and is most famous for one mission which successfully transported 20 tons of gold and various other securities of the Philippine currency reserve to Pearl Harbor
- USS Trout (SS-566), a Tang-class submarine, that was scrapped in 2009
