= Trout Lake (Florida) =

- Location within Florida Location within the United States
- Location: Polk County, Florida and Highlands County, Florida
- Coordinates: 27°38′49″N 81°30′27″W
- Type: lake
- Surface area: 148 acres (0.60 km^{2})
- Average depth: 30 feet (9.1 m)
- Surface elevation: 95 feet (29 m)

Trout Lake is on the border of Polk County, Florida and Highlands County, Florida. It is mostly in Polk County. This lake has a surface area of 148 acres (0.60 km^{2}), has a spring feeding it and has a depth of 30 feet (9.1 m). Trout Lake is a natural lake, as are most of the lakes in Florida. The lake is found at an elevation of 95 feet (29 m).

Lake Trout Drive runs along the entire south side of the Lake. Houses line the lake along Lake Trout Drive. On the north side of the lake, in Polk County, a rock road provides public access to the lake. Sand trails lead to the lake edge and allow access for boats. These trails and the road can only be used in dry weather. In wet weather the trails are completely unusable and the road itself can be treacherous. The entire east side of Trout Lake is inaccessible to the public.

Camp Wingmann straddles the county line and is partly in both counties. Camp Wingmann borders the lake on the west and northwest. Camp Wingmann was established in 1939. There have always been permanent buildings there, although the camp's ownership changed several times. It is currently owned and run by the Episcopal Diocese of Central Florida. While Camp Wingmann is considered a summer camp, it is used throughout the year.

Camp Wingmann occupies forty-two acres. It has a variety of buildings. The largest, Louttit Lodge, is the most northerly building. The camp also has a very good swimming area on the west shore of Trout Lake.
