= USS Petrita =

History

United States
- Name: USS Petrita
- Namesake: Mexican name (a Spanish, feminine proper name) retained
- Acquired: 23 October 1846
- Fate: Lost before 6 March 1848

General characteristics
- Type: Screw steamer
- Displacement: 200 tons
- Armament: 1 gun

USS Petrita was a steamer that served in the United States Navy from 1846 to 1848. She saw service in the Mexican War.

Petrita was a small, swift, screw steamer built in the United States and in Mexican service when the Mexican War broke out in 1846. She was one of two steamers and various other vessels in the Grijalva River at the town of Frontera when a U.S. Navy squadron commanded by Commodore Matthew C. Perry surprised Mexican forces there and captured her along with the other Mexican vessels. She was added to the American squadron.

Early the next morning, Perry sailed farther up the Grijalva River to attack the town of San Juan Bautista. At 9:00 a.m. the squadron passed the abandoned Fort Acacchappa, where it stopped long enough to spike the guns. It was noon when Perry's squadron arrived at San Juan Bautista, where it captured five more Mexican vessels and bombarded the town. Unable to garrison the town because of a lack of men, Perry withdrew to Antón Lizardo, an island just south of Veracruz, Mexico.

Petrita was inactive for the remainder of 1846 and the first part of 1847 due to a coal shortage and violent storms called “northers” which occur during the winter months.

On 7 March 1847, Commodore David Conner and General Winfield Scott made a reconnaissance of Veracruz in Petrita. She ran close to the Castle of San Juan de Ulúa and was straddled by gunfire, but sustained no damage. The Siege of Veracruz began two days later.

Petrita later participated in the amphibious assault on Veracruz. Commodore Conner's plan was to have his large warships tow landing craft from Anton Lizardo to Isla de Sacrificios, a distance of a few miles (kilometers). Small steamers would then pick up the tow and run the landing craft in to shore. The sloop-of-war USS St. Mary's transferred her tow to Petrita, and Petrita towed them in safely. By 10:00 p.m., more than 10,000 American troops had landed, and the operation was a complete success.

Suffering from engine defects, Petrita was inactive for the remainder of the Mexican War. She was lost off Alvarado, Mexico before 6 March 1848. All hands were saved.
