= Trout Run =

Trout Run may refer to:

- Trout Run (Cacapon River), in the Potomac River watershed
- Trout Run (East Branch Fishing Creek), a stream in Sullivan County, Pennsylvania
- Trout Run, Pennsylvania, a village north of Williamsport, Lycoming County, Pennsylvania at the base of Round Top Mountain
- Trout Run (retreat), a private and presidential retreat near Thurmont, Maryland
- Trout Run (Shamokin Creek), in Northumberland County, Pennsylvania
