= Maritime history of Colonial America =

The history of ships in North America and the maritime history of Colonial America has a strong foundation.

== Description ==
The beginnings go back to at least as far as the first European contact with the Americas, when Leif Erikson established a short-lived settlement called Vinland in present-day Newfoundland. The existence of an actual shipping industry gradually came into being. Christopher Columbus was the first European to set foot on what would one day become U.S. territory when he came to Puerto Rico in 1493. In the 15th century, Europeans brought horses, cattle and hogs to the Americas.

Spanish explorers also reached the present-day United States. The first confirmed landing in the continental US was by a Spaniard, Juan Ponce de León, who landed in 1513 at a lush shore he christened La Florida. The Spanish sent some settlers, creating the first permanent European settlement in the continental United States at St. Augustine, Florida, in 1565 and later Santa Fe, New Mexico, San Antonio, Tucson, San Diego, Los Angeles and San Francisco. Most Spanish settlements were along the California coast or the Santa Fe River in New Mexico.

The first successful English colony was established in 1607, on the James River at Jamestown. It languished for decades until a new wave of settlers arrived in the late 17th century and set up commercial agriculture based on tobacco.

The connection between the American colonies and Europe, with shipping as its cornerstone, would continue to grow unhindered for almost two hundred years.

== See also ==
- Awards and decorations of the United States Merchant Marine
- History of navigation
- Honourable Company of Master Mariners London
- Jones Act
- Liberty ship
- United States Merchant Marine
- Navy Reserve Merchant Marine Badge
- United States Maritime Service
- United States Merchant Marine Academy
- Slave ship and History of slavery in the United States
