= Thomas A. King =

American merchant mariner (1921–2012)

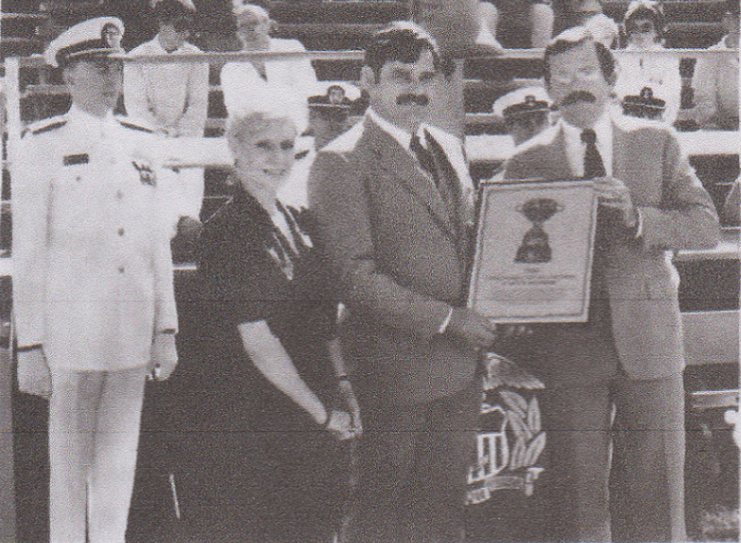
At viewer's far left, Rear Admiral Thomas A. King, 6th Superintendent of the United States Merchant Marine Academy, at awards ceremony

Thomas A. King (1921 – April 5, 2012), Rear Admiral (United States), was the first graduate of the United States Merchant Marine Academy (USMMA) at Kings Point, New York (1942) to become its Superintendent He was the 6th Superintendent of the USMMA, serving in that capacity from 1980-1987.

== Career ==
As a young merchant marine officer, the 6’2” King had served on supply ships in the Pacific Theater of World War II, including in New Guinea, the Solomon Islands, at Guadalcanal, Luzon, Manila and Corregidor. Of these combat theater World War II merchant mariners and War veterans, General Douglas MacArthur said “They have brought us our lifeblood and they had paid for it with some of their own. I saw them bombed off the Philippines and in New Guinea ports. When it was humanly possible, when their ships were not blown out from under them by bombs or torpedoes, they have delivered their cargoes to us who needed them so badly. In war it is performance that counts.” Later as a maritime specialist, King was requested to assist the Office of the Commander of the First Amphibious Force in planning the United Nations Forces invasion of Inchon at outbreak of the Korean War. In 1951, he joined the United States Maritime Administration (MARAD), which maintains the viability of waterborne transportation and the merchant marine in the United States and also maintains the National Defense Reserve Fleet. King served in numerous capacities of increasing responsibility with MARAD until commissioned a United States Maritime Service Rear Admiral and named Superintendent of the Academy in 1980. He died at the age of 91 on April 5, 2012.

Preceded by Rear Admiral Arthur B. Engel, USCG	Superintendent US Merchant Marine Academy; 1980-1987	Succeeded by Rear Admiral Paul L. Krinsky, USMS
