= James A. Helis =

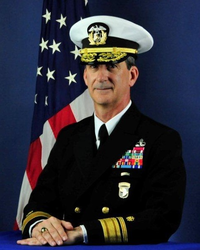
Rear Admiral James A. Helis, 12th Superintendent of the United States Merchant Marine Academy

Dr. James Andrew Helis (born June 25, 1957) is a retired United States Army colonel, a rear admiral in the United States Maritime Service and was the twelfth Superintendent of the United States Merchant Marine Academy, being replaced by Rear Admiral Buono in 2018.

Helis was born in Texas and raised in Louisiana. A 1979 graduate of the United States Military Academy at West Point, New York, and a decorated Afghanistan War veteran, he served thirty years in the United States Army, retiring at the rank of colonel. In 2012, Helis was commissioned a United States Maritime Service rear admiral and appointed Superintendent of the United States Merchant Marine Academy by US Secretary of Transportation Ray LaHood. Helis served his last eight years with the Army as an academic, culminating as Chair of the Department of National Security and Strategy at the United States Army War College, Carlisle, Pennsylvania. Helis earned a Master of Arts in political science from the University of Pennsylvania in 1990, a Master of Military Affairs from the United States Army Command and General Staff College, School of Advanced Military Studies at Fort Leavenworth, Kansas in 1991, and a Doctor of Philosophy in international relations from the Fletcher School of Law and Diplomacy at Tufts University in 2006. His doctoral thesis was entitled Getting there from here: Translating political goals into military objectives in conflicts short of war and his advisor was Robert L. Pfaltzgraff Jr. An airborne United States Army Ranger, Helis was awarded the Army Master Parachutist Badge. Helis and his wife Jan have two sons, Dr. Corbin Helis, a physician and West Point graduate, and Ian Helis.

| Preceded by Rear Admiral Philip H. Greene Jr., USN | Superintendent, US Merchant Marine Academy; 2012–2018 | Succeeded by Vice Admiral Jack Buono, USMS |
