= Allen B. Worley =

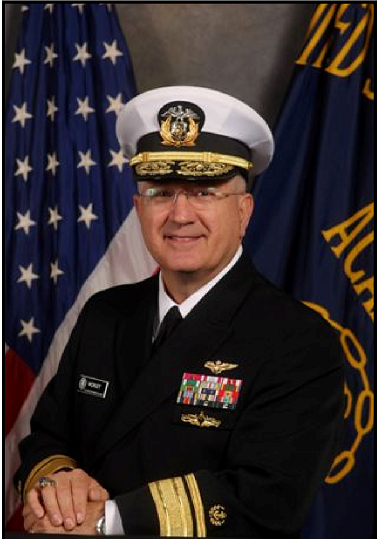
US Rear Admiral Allen B. Worley, 10th Superintendent of the United States Merchant Marine Academy

Allen Blaine Worley of Roanoke, Virginia, Captain (USN), Rear Admiral (USMS), was the tenth Superintendent of the United States Merchant Marine Academy (USMMA) at Kings Point, New York. Retired career U.S. Navy and a 1974 graduate of the United States Naval Academy at Annapolis, Maryland, Worley was Superintendent of the Texas Maritime Academy, one of the United States' six state maritime academies prior to his being appointed Superintendent of the United States Merchant Marine Academy in 2008. In addition to his Naval Academy BS degree in physics, Webster University awarded him a MA degree in business administration and personnel management, and the United States Naval War College awarded him a MA degree in national security and strategic studies. Admiral Worley resigned from his position as Superintendent of the USMMA in 2009, effective January 4, 2010, serving as the Academy’s Superintendent for just over a year.

Preceded by Vice Admiral Joseph D. Stewart, USMS	Superintendent US Merchant Marine Academy; 2009-2010	Succeeded by Rear Admiral Philip H. Greene, Jr., USN
