= Joseph D. Stewart =

United States Marine Corps general (1942–2019)

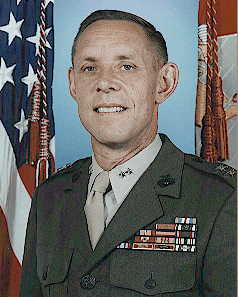
- then Major General Stewart, USMC
- Born: July 9, 1942; Baltimore, Maryland, U.S.
- Died: April 30, 2019 (aged 76); Ocean View, Delaware, U.S.
- Military career
- Allegiance: United States of America
- Branch: United States Marine Corps; United States Maritime Service
- Service years: 1964-1998 (USMC); 1998-2008 (USMS)
- Rank: Major general (USMC); Vice admiral (USMS)
- Commands: Deputy Chief of Staff for Installations and Logistics; United States Merchant Marine Academy (1998-2008)
- Conflicts: Vietnam War
- Awards: Navy Distinguished Service Medal; Defense Superior Service Medal; Legion of Merit

Joseph D. Stewart, also known as "Joey D," (July 9, 1942 – April 30, 2019) was a United States Marine Corps major general, who after his retirement from the Marine Corps, was appointed as superintendent of the United States Merchant Marine Academy (USMMA) on August 1, 1998. He retired from the U.S. Maritime Service with the rank of vice admiral on September 30, 2008.

== Education ==
Born in Baltimore, Maryland, Stewart graduated from the Severn School in 1960 and the United States Naval Academy in 1964. Vice Admiral Stewart earned a master's degree in Operational Research from the U.S. Naval Postgraduate School, and a master's degree in Management from Salve Regina College and the Naval War College, Newport, Rhode Island.

Stewart played lacrosse while at the Naval Academy, playing on three straight national championship teams.

== Marine Corps career ==
Upon his graduation from the Naval Academy, Stewart entered the Marine Corps as a second lieutenant. During his thirty-four-year Marine Corps career, he served in a variety of command and staff positions. He commanded a tank company, a supply battalion, and a defense distribution depot. He has also served as an instructor and athletic coach at the Naval Academy. As a major general, he served as commander, Marine Corps Logistics Base Albany in Georgia. Stewart served as deputy chief of staff for installations and logistics at the U.S. Marine Corps Headquarters in Washington, D.C.

He retired from the Marine Corps at the rank of major general in 1998 and soon after assumed the duties as the academy superintendent.

== Superintendent of the US Merchant Marine Academy ==
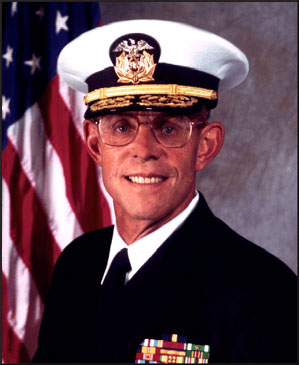
VADM Stewart, U.S. Merchant Marine Academy

The ninth person to hold this post since the institution's dedication in 1943, Vice Admiral Stewart headed a federal academy with a student body of some 920 midshipmen and a waterfront campus covering more than 80 acres (320,000 m^{2}). The academy, operated by the United States Department of Transportation's Maritime Administration, is located at Kings Point, New York. It is one of the nation's prime sources of licensed merchant marine officers and is renowned for its maritime education and training programs. Vice Admiral Stewart retired from the United States Merchant Marine Academy on September 30, 2008. He died from melanoma in 2019 at the age of 76.

== Military awards ==
Vice Admiral Stewart's personal decorations include:

| | Navy Distinguished Service Medal | | |
| Defense Superior Service Medal | Guardian Medal | Legion of Merit | Navy and Marine Corps Commendation Medal w/ 1 award star |
| Combat Action Ribbon | Navy Presidential Unit Citation | Navy Unit Commendation | Navy Meritorious Unit Commendation |
| National Defense Service Medal w/ 1 service star | Vietnam Service Medal w/ 3 service stars | Southwest Asia Service Medal | Humanitarian Service Medal |
| Navy Sea Service Deployment Ribbon | Vietnam Gallantry Cross unit citation | Vietnam Civil Actions unit citation | Vietnam Campaign Medal |

== Dates of rank ==
=== Marine Corps ===
- Second Lieutenant: June 1964
- First Lieutenant: December 1965
- Captain: March 1967
- Major: January 1974
- Lieutenant Colonel: October 1980
- Colonel: January 1986
- Brigadier General: June 1991 &‐ July 11, 1996
- Major General: August 1993

=== Maritime Service ===
- Rear Admiral: August 1, 1998
- Vice Admiral: 2003

| Preceded by Rear Admiral Thomas T. Matteson | Superintendent, US Merchant Marine Academy; 1998-2008 | Succeeded by Rear Admiral Allen B. Worley |
