= Richard R. McNulty =

American admiral (1899–1980)

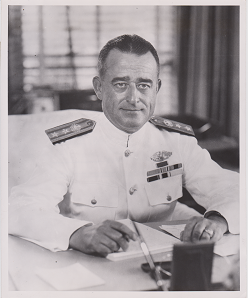
Rear Admiral (United States) Richard Robert McNulty

Richard Robert McNulty was a former United States Navy rear admiral and a former United States Maritime Service vice admiral, was born in Gloucester, Massachusetts, on April 20, 1899, and died in Boston, Massachusetts, on November 1, 1980. The United States Merchant Marine Academy community considers Vice Admiral McNulty, a World War II veteran, who had long advocated for the academy's creation, its "Father". The academy's McNulty Campus is named for the vice admiral. He served as the academy's 3rd superintendent. Vice Admiral McNulty was, too, a professor emeritus at Georgetown University.

== Career ==
McNulty served as a Merchant marine officer from 1917 to 1920. Beginning as a nautical specialist, he served with the U.S. Dept. of Navy from 1920 to 1937. McNulty was supervisor of the U.S. Merchant Marine Cadet Corps of the United States Maritime Commission from 1938 to 1948. He was on active duty in the U.S. Navy during World War II from 1942 until 1946, attaining the rank of commodore. In 1946, McNulty was appointed the 3rd superintendent of the U.S. Merchant Marine Academy at Kings Point, New York, the latest of the five United States Service academies and an institution for which McNulty had advocated since the late 1920s. He served as the academy's superintendent until his retirement from the military in 1948. McNulty was a member of the Society of Naval Architects and Engineers.

== Education ==
Richard Robert McNulty graduated from the Massachusetts Nautical School (1919). He received a B.S. from the School of Foreign Service at Georgetown University (1922).

== Major military decorations ==
- Order of Naval Merit (Cuba) (1939)
- Legion of Merit (1946)

== Other honors ==
- Georgetown University's McNulty Foreign Service Scholarship (established 1945) is named for Vice Admiral McNulty.
- The Vice Admiral Richard R. McNulty Award is among the awards bestowed annually upon members of the USMMA graduating class.

Preceded by Rear Admiral Giles C. Stedman, USNR	Superintendent of the US Merchant Marine Academy; 1946–1948	Succeeded by Rear Admiral Gordon McLintock, USMS
