= Nat Krinsky =

American basketball player

Nathan Krinsky, also known as Nat Krinsky, (8 January 1899 – 8 May 1984) was born to Russian immigrants and was a professional basketball player. Krinsky is included in several pictures of the Basketball Hall of Fame, and is in the Basketball Old Timers Hall of Fame. Krinskym, who was Jewish, is mentioned in Bob Wechsler's Day by Day in Jewish Sports History.

After graduating from Boys High School in 1917, Krinsky attended the City College of New York.

Krinsky was the father of Paul L. Krinsky, former superintendent of the United States Merchant Marine Academy, and Edward M. Krinsky, former Director of Operations for the United States Basketball League.
