= Joanna Nunan =

U.S. Coast Guard admiral and Superintendent of the US Merchant Marine Academy

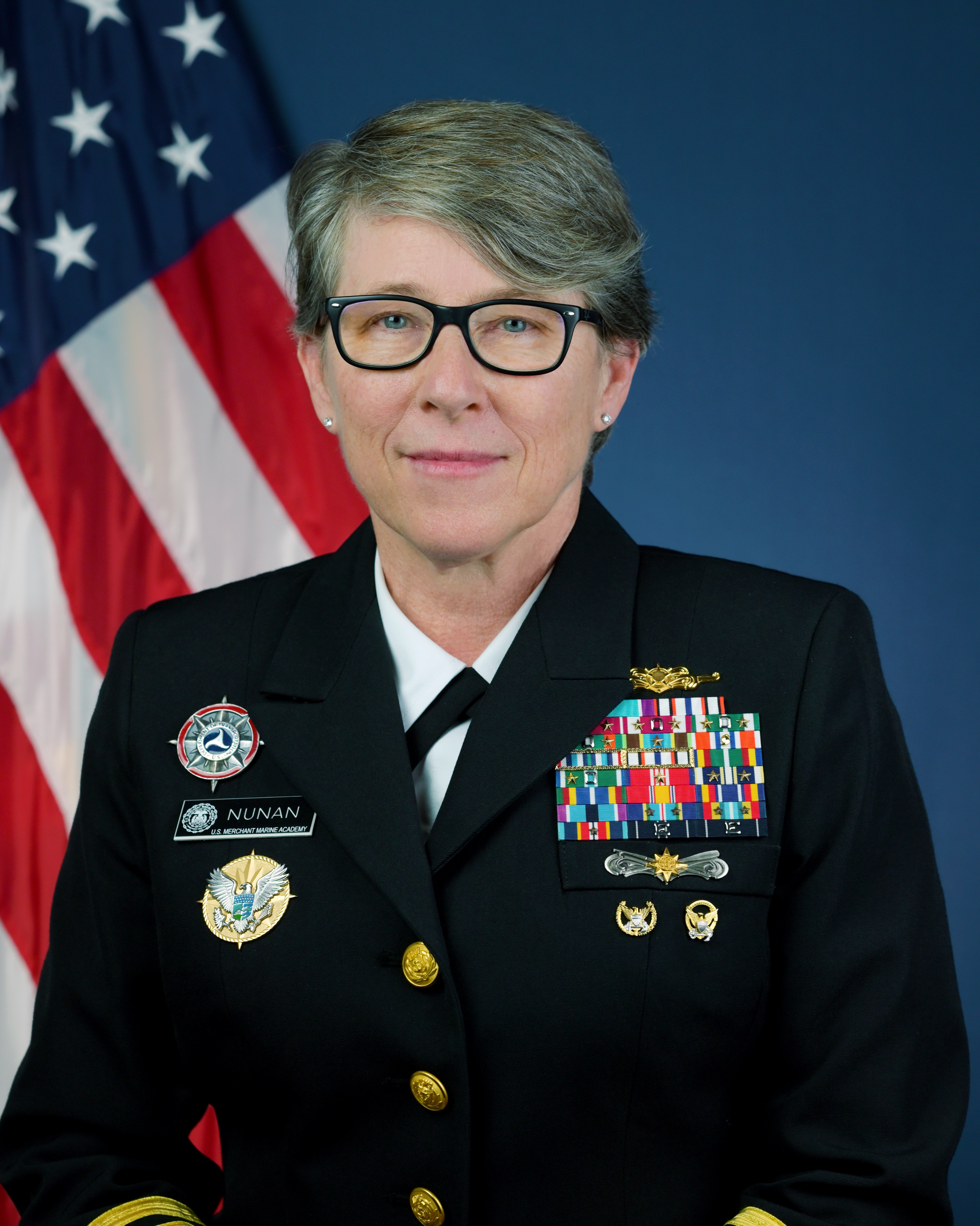
- Official portrait, 2023

14th Superintendent of the United States Merchant Marine Academy
- In office 8 December 2022 – 24 June 2025
- President: Joe Biden; Donald Trump
- Administrator: Ann C. Phillips; Sang Yi (acting)
- Preceded by: Joachim J. Buono; Susan Dunlap (acting)
- Succeeded by: Anthony J. Ceraolo

Personal details
- Born: Joanna M. Collins; 3 October 1965 (age 60) Washington, D. C., U.S.
- Education: United States Coast Guard Academy (BS); Rensselaer Polytechnic Institute (MBA)
- Uniformed service
- Allegiance: United States
- Branch: United States Coast Guard; United States Maritime Service (Note: The Maritime Service is no longer organized as a formal armed service, but still actively commission officers.)
- Service years: 1987–2022 (Coast Guard); 2022–2025 (Maritime Service)
- Rank: Rear Admiral (Coast Guard); Vice Admiral (Maritime Service)
- Awards: Coast Guard Distinguished Service Medal; Legion of Merit (2)

Joanna M. Nunan (born 3 October 1965) is a former United States Maritime Service vice admiral, and a retired United States Coast Guard rear admiral, who served as the 14th superintendent of the United States Merchant Marine Academy from 8 December 2022 to 24 June 2025. The first woman to become superintendent of the academy, her appointment was lauded by Secretary of Transportation Pete Buttigieg and administrator of the United States Maritime Administration Ann C. Phillips.

A native of Bridgeport, Connecticut, Nunan served in the Coast Guard from 1987 to 2022, eventually retiring in 2022 as the deputy for personnel readiness to the deputy commandant for mission support. She also served as assistant commandant for human resources from July 2019 to July 2021, commander of the Ninth Coast Guard District from August 2017 to June 2019, and commander of Coast Guard Sector Honolulu from August 2010 to May 2013.

A graduate of the United States Coast Guard Academy and Rensselaer Polytechnic Institute, Nunan also has multiple Merchant Marine licenses.

== Awards and decorations ==
Vice Admiral Joanna Nunan earned the following throughout her ongoing military career:

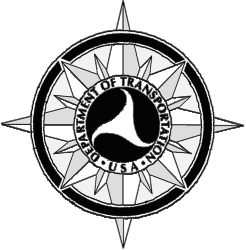
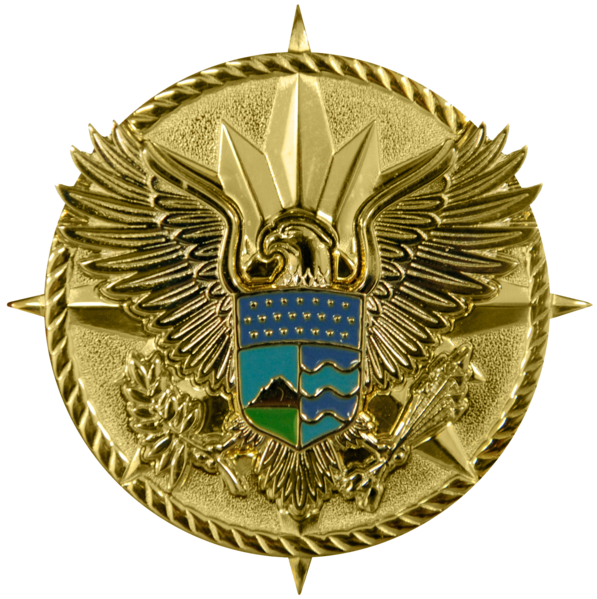

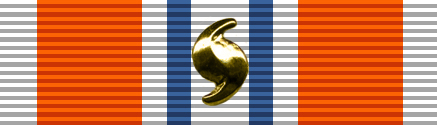

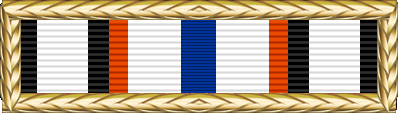

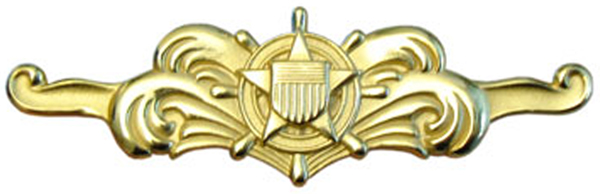
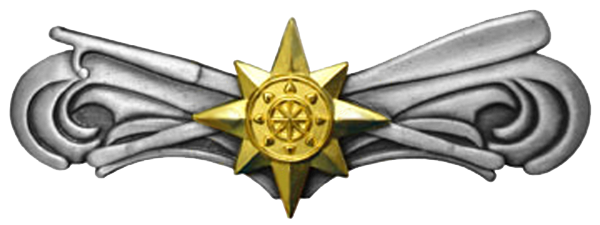

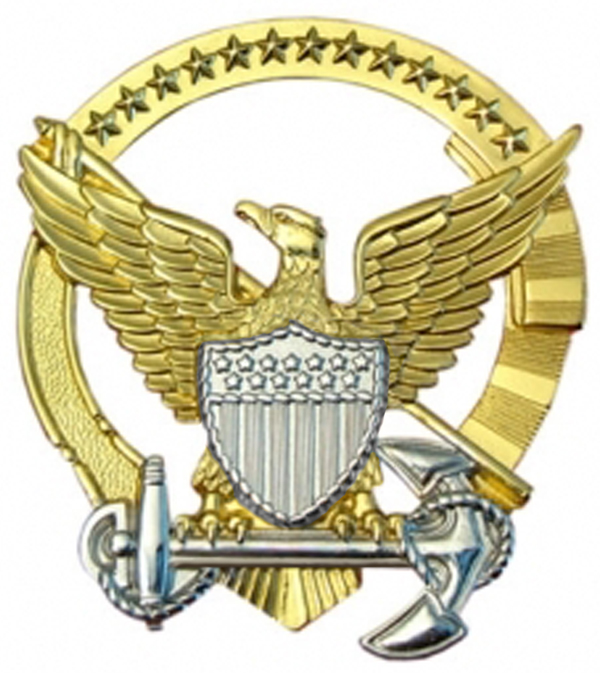
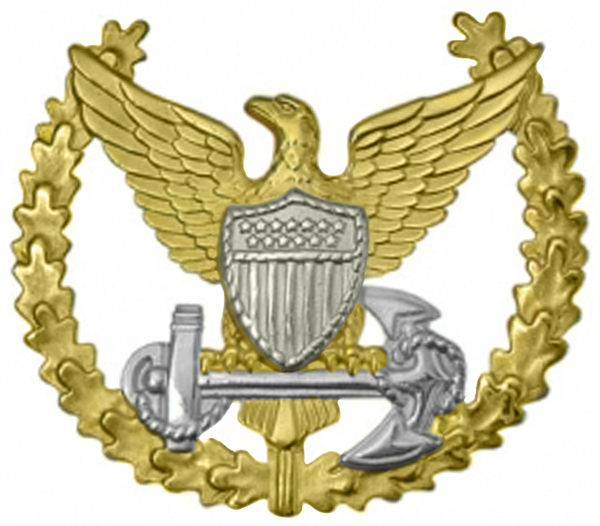

Badges	Office of the Secretary of Transportation Identification Badge		Office of the Secretary of Homeland Security Identification Badge
1st row	Coast Guard Distinguished Service Medal		Secretary of Transportation Outstanding Achievement Medal
2nd row	Legion of Merit with 3 Gold Stars	Meritorious Service Medal with 2 Gold Stars and "O" device	Coast Guard Commendation Medal with 2 Gold Stars and "O" device
3rd row	Coast Guard Achievement Medal with 2 Gold Star and "O" device	Commandant's Letter of Commendation Ribbon	U.S Coast Guard Presidential Unit Citation
4th row	DHS Outstanding Unit Award	Secretary of Transportation Outstanding Unit Award	Coast Guard Unit Commendation
5th row	Meritorious Unit Commendation with 1 Gold Star and "O" device	Meritorious Team Commendation with 1 Gold Star	Coast Guard E Ribbon with 2 Gold Stars
6th row	Coast Guard Bicentennial Unit Commendation	National Defense Service Medal with 1 Bronze Service Star	Global War on Terrorism Service Medal
7th row	Humanitarian Service Medal	Special Operations Service Ribbon with 2 Bronze Service Stars	Coast Guard Sea Service Ribbon
8th row	Coast Guard Overseas Service Ribbon with 1 Bronze Service star	Marksmanship Medal (Rifle)	Marksmanship Medal (Pistol)
Qualification Insignia	Cutterman Insignia - Officer		Advanced Boat Force Operations Insignia
Command Identification Badge	Command Afloat Pin		Command Ashore Pin

== Notes ==
Military offices
Preceded by Joachim J. Buono; Susan Dunlap (interim)	14th Superintendent of the United States Merchant Marine Academy; 2022–2025	Succeeded by Anthony J. Ceraolo
