= Joachim J. Buono =

US Merchant Marine officer (born c. 1956)

Vice Admiral Joachim J. Buono
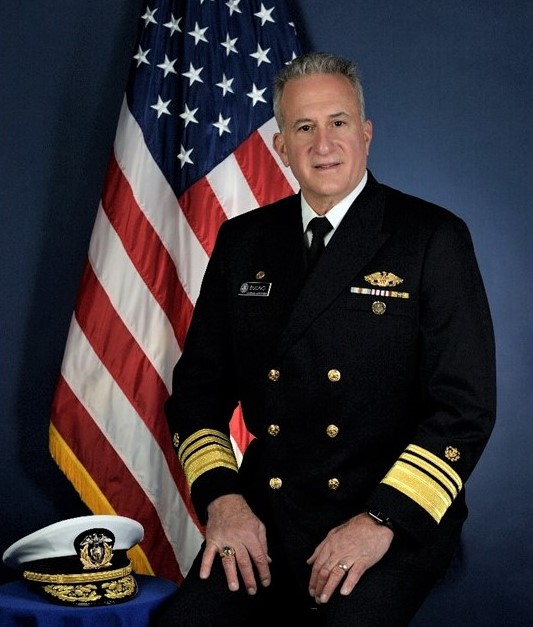
- Vice Admiral Joachim J. Buono in 2021

13th Superintendent of the United States Merchant Marine Academy
- In office November 9, 2018 – June 18th, 2022
- President: Donald Trump; Joe Biden
- Administrator: Mark H. Buzby; Ann C. Phillips
- Preceded by: James A. Helis
- Succeeded by: Joanna Nunan; Susan Dunlap (interim)

Personal details
- Born: Joachim Buono c. 1956 (age 69–70) Brooklyn, New York
- Nickname: Jack
- Uniformed service
- Education: United States Merchant Marine Academy (BS)
- Allegiance: United States of America
- Branch: United States Maritime Service
- Service years: 1978–2022
- Rank: Vice Admiral
- Commands: U.S. Merchant Marine Academy; EXXON Lexington; EXXON Jamestown; EXXON Houston; EXXON Philadelphia; EXXON Charleston

Joachim J. "Jack" Buono (born c. 1955) retired as vice admiral in the United States Maritime Service who last served as the thirteenth superintendent of the United States Merchant Marine Academy (USMMA). He took command of the Academy on November 9, 2018.

== Early life and education ==
Buono is a 1978 graduate of the United States Merchant Marine Academy. While at USMMA, Buono received the Admiral Emory S. Land Medal and Award for outstanding achievement in Naval Architecture. At graduation, he received a bachelor’s degree in Marine Transportation, a U.S. Coast Guard license as a Third Mate (Deck), and a commission in the U.S. Navy Reserve, which he maintained for 11 years.

== Career ==
Immediately following graduation, he joined the Marine Department of Exxon Company USA, a predecessor organization of SeaRiver Maritime, Inc. Between 1978 and 1986 he served as a deck officer aboard various sized crude and chemical tankers before being promoted to Master Mariner. In 1991, Buono transferred ashore where he progressed through the management ranks before retiring as President and CEO of SeaRiver Maritime in 2016.

He previously served on the Board of Trustees at the Coast Guard Foundation, and the Webb Institute, as Vice Chairman of the Oil Companies International Marine Forum, on the Board of Advisors with the International Tanker Owners Pollution Federation, as Chairman of the North America Regional Committee of the American Bureau of Shipping, and on the Board of Advisors for the Global Maritime and Transportation School at USMMA.

In addition to having earned a U.S. Coast Guard License as Master, Steam and Motor Vessels of Any Gross Tons Upon Oceans, Buono has served as Captain of Exxon Lexington, Exxon Jamestown, Exxon Houston, Exxon Philadelphia, and Exxon Charleston.

He has received numerous awards and citations, most recently the Secretary of Transportation’s Gold Award for meritorious achievement in response to the COVID-19 global health emergency. He also won the U.S. Merchant Marine Academy Meritorious Service and Outstanding Professional Achievement Awards, the Seafarers International House 2017 Honoree Award, the Seamen’s Church Institute 2016 Safety Leader Award, the North America Marine Environmental Protection Association 2016 Environmental Leader Award, and a commendation from the Prince William Sound Regional Citizens Advisory Council. Vice Admiral Jack Buono was recognized among the Top 100 Most Influential People in Shipping from 2012 to 2015 by Lloyd’s List. A dedicated supporter of the U.S. Merchant Marine Academy (USMMA) and the Alumni Association and Foundation (AAF), he exemplifies leadership and commitment to maritime excellence. In 2022, VADM Buono received the prestigious Kings Pointer of the Year Award, honoring his outstanding contributions to the Academy and the maritime industry.

Additionally, he was honored in 2024 with the "Skip" Prosser Achievement Award, established in 2007 to commemorate the life and legacy of George Edward "Skip" Prosser (Class of 1972), recognizes alumni who embody qualities such as integrity, dedication, and service to others. As a distinguished member of the Flying Bridge and the Howard Payne Conway Society, VADM Buono’s efforts continue to inspire the maritime community and uphold the values of the USMMA.

In January 2022, Vice Admiral Buono submitted his retirement to the Department of Transportation after 45 years in the maritime industry. Vice Admiral Buono retired after overseeing the graduation of the 2022 class.

Military offices
Preceded by James A. Helis	13th Superintendent of the United States Merchant Marine Academy; 2018–2022	Succeeded by Susan Dunlap (interim); Joanna Nunan
