= Gordon McLintock =

United States Maritime Service Vice Admiral (1903–1990)

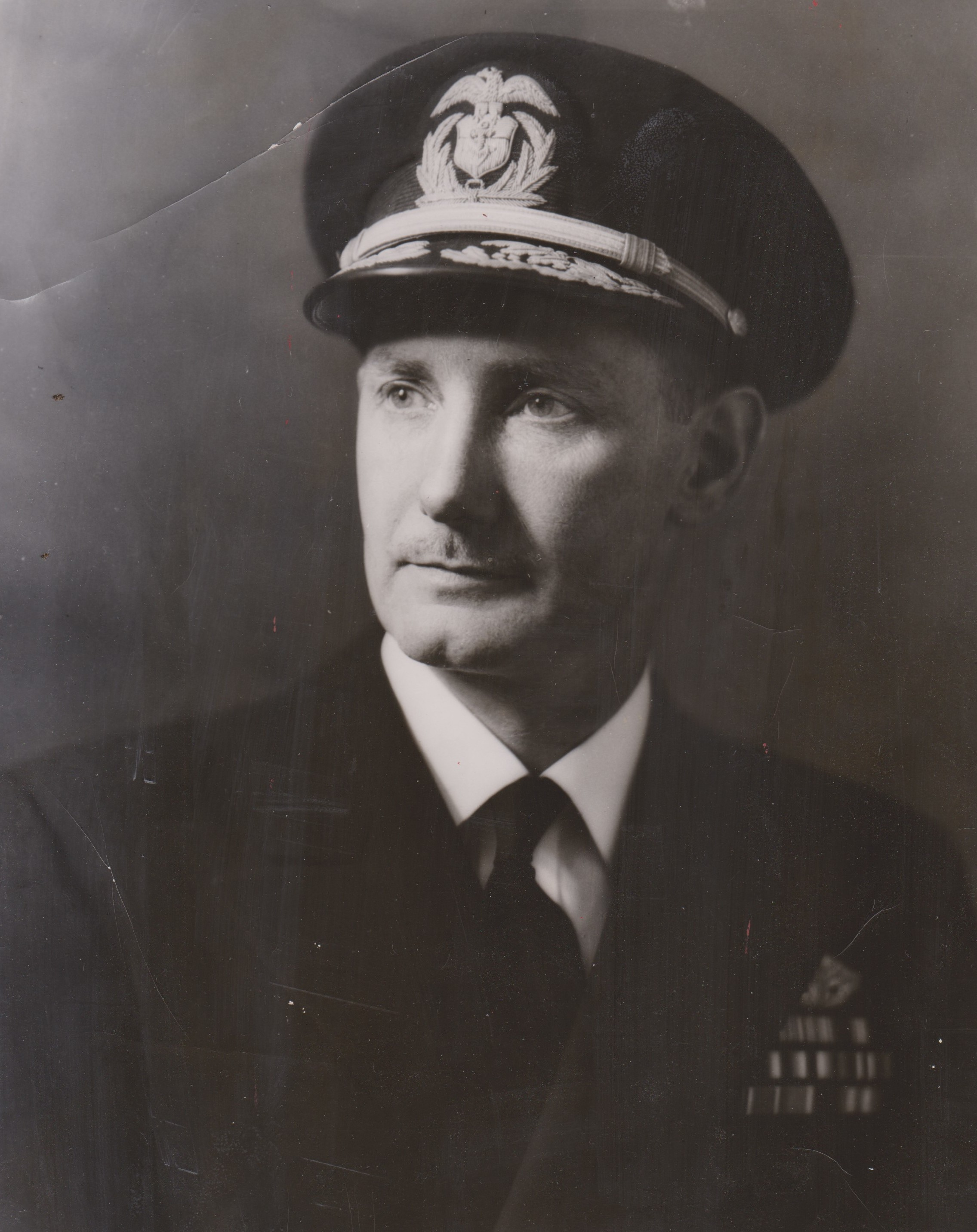
- Born: February 10, 1903; Sunderland, England
- Died: April 23, 1990 (aged 87); Bethesda, Maryland, U.S.
- Military career
- Allegiance: United States
- Branch: United States Naval Reserve; United States Maritime Service
- Service years: 1920s–1970
- Rank: Vice admiral (USMS)
- Commands: Superintendent of the United States Merchant Marine Academy

George Gordon McLintock, Vice Admiral (USMS), (February 10, 1903 – April 23, 1990) was the longest serving Superintendent of the United States Merchant Marine Academy, one of the 5 United States service academies, serving from 1948 to 1970.

== Biography ==
Born in Sunderland, England of a long tradition of British merchant marine seaman, McLintock first went to sea on a passenger liner with his merchant marine officer father, William McLintock, at the age of 3 years. After receiving a commission as a cadet in the British merchant navy in 1918, McLintock had a 30-year career as a merchant marine officer before being named the 4th Superintendent of the United States Merchant Marine Academy in 1948. McLintock, who became a naturalized United States citizen in 1921, was chief inspection officer of that country's War Shipping Administration during the Second World War. He was also president of the American Institute of Navigation from 1947 to 1949. The Vice Admiral was a graduate of the United Kingdom’s Sevenoaks School (founded 1432 AD). He died of bone cancer in Chevy Chase, Maryland.

== Honors and awards ==
- Naval Reserve Medal with star (20 years)
- American Campaign Medal
- World War II Victory Medal
- World War II Victory Medal, U.S. Merchant Marine
- Order of Saint Dennis of Zante (Greece), Knight Commander
- British War Medal (United Kingdom)
- Victory Medal (United Kingdom)
- Officer, Philippine Legion of Honor (8 point Star)
- Officer, Order of Maritime Merit (France)
- Officer, Order of Polonia Restitute (Poland)
- Silver Cross of Merit with Swords (Poland)
- American Legion Distinguished Service Medal
- Greek American War Veterans Medal

Preceded by Rear Admiral Richard R. McNulty, USNR	Superintendent, US Merchant Marine Academy; 1948–1970	Succeeded by Rear Admiral Arthur B. Engel, USCG
