= Benjamin F. Engel =

- Born: May 1, 1914; Grand Rapids, Michigan, U.S.
- Died: August 15, 1983 (aged 69); Kona, Hawaii
- Education: United States Coast Guard Academy; Naval War College
- Military career
- Allegiance: United States
- Branch: United States Coast Guard
- Rank: Vice Admiral
- Conflicts: Second World War

Benjamin F. Engel (May 1, 1914 – August 15, 1983) was a vice admiral in the United States Coast Guard.

== Biography ==
Engel was born on May 1, 1914, in Grand Rapids, Michigan. He graduated from Ottawa Hills High School in 1932. Engel's twin brother, Arthur, would become a rear admiral in the Coast Guard.

== Career ==
Engel graduated from the United States Coast Guard Academy in 1938. Afterwards, he was assigned to the USCGC Sebago.

During World War II, he served aboard the USCGC Mendota (WHEC-69) and the USCGC Bibb (WPG-31). He then underwent aviation training at Naval Air Station Pensacola. Afterwards, he was stationed at Coast Guard Air Station Port Angeles before furthering his training at Coast Guard Air Station Brooklyn. Engel was later assigned to Coast Guard Air Station San Diego before undergoing more training at Coast Guard Air Station St. Petersburg.

From 1951 to 1953, Engel was Executive Officer of Coast Guard Air Station Miami. In 1957, he entered the Naval War College as a student, where he would also later become an instructor. Afterwards, he assumed command of Coast Guard Air Station Brooklyn.

Engel retired in 1974. Awards he received during his career include the Legion of Merit, the American Defense Service Medal and the World War II Victory Medal.
