= Arthur B. Engel =

- Born: May 1, 1914; Grand Rapids, Michigan, U.S.
- Died: November 9, 1992 (aged 78); Florida, United States
- Relatives: Benjamin F. Engel
- Military career
- Allegiance: United States
- Branch: United States Coast Guard
- Service years: 1938–1980
- Rank: Rear admiral
- Commands: Superintendent of the United States Coast Guard Academy; Superintendent of the United States Merchant Marine Academy

Arthur B. Engel (May 1, 1914 – November 9, 1992) was a rear admiral in the United States Coast Guard. At different points in his maritime career, he served as Superintendent of the United States Coast Guard Academy at New London, Connecticut and as Superintendent of the United States Merchant Marine Academy at Kings Point, New York.

== Biography ==
Engel was born in Grand Rapids, Michigan in 1914. He graduated from the Massachusetts Institute of Technology. Engel's twin brother, Benjamin, would later become a vice admiral in the Coast Guard.

== Career ==
Engel graduated from the United States Coast Guard Academy in 1938. During World War II, he served aboard the USCGC Duane (WPG-33).

Later, he served aboard the USCGC Pontchartrain (WHEC-70) from 1945 to 1947, as executive officer of the USCGC Mackinaw (WAGB-83) from 1951 to 1953 and as commanding officer of the USCGC Klamath (WHEC-66). Additionally, he was stationed at the Coast Guard Yard.

From 1961 to 1965, Engel was head of the Department of Applied Science and Engineering of the Coast Guard Academy. Afterwards, he returned to the Coast Guard Yard as commanding officer. During this time, he was awarded the Coast Guard Commendation Medal.

Engel was appointed Superintendent of the Coast Guard Academy in 1967. He remained in the position until his retirement from the Coast Guard in 1970. Afterwards, he served as Superintendent of the United States Merchant Marine Academy until 1980.

Preceded by Vice Admiral Gordon McLintock, USMS	Superintendent US Merchant Marine Academy; 1970-1980	Succeeded by Rear Admiral Thomas A. King, USMS
