= Albert J. Herberger =

United States vice admiral (1931–2022)

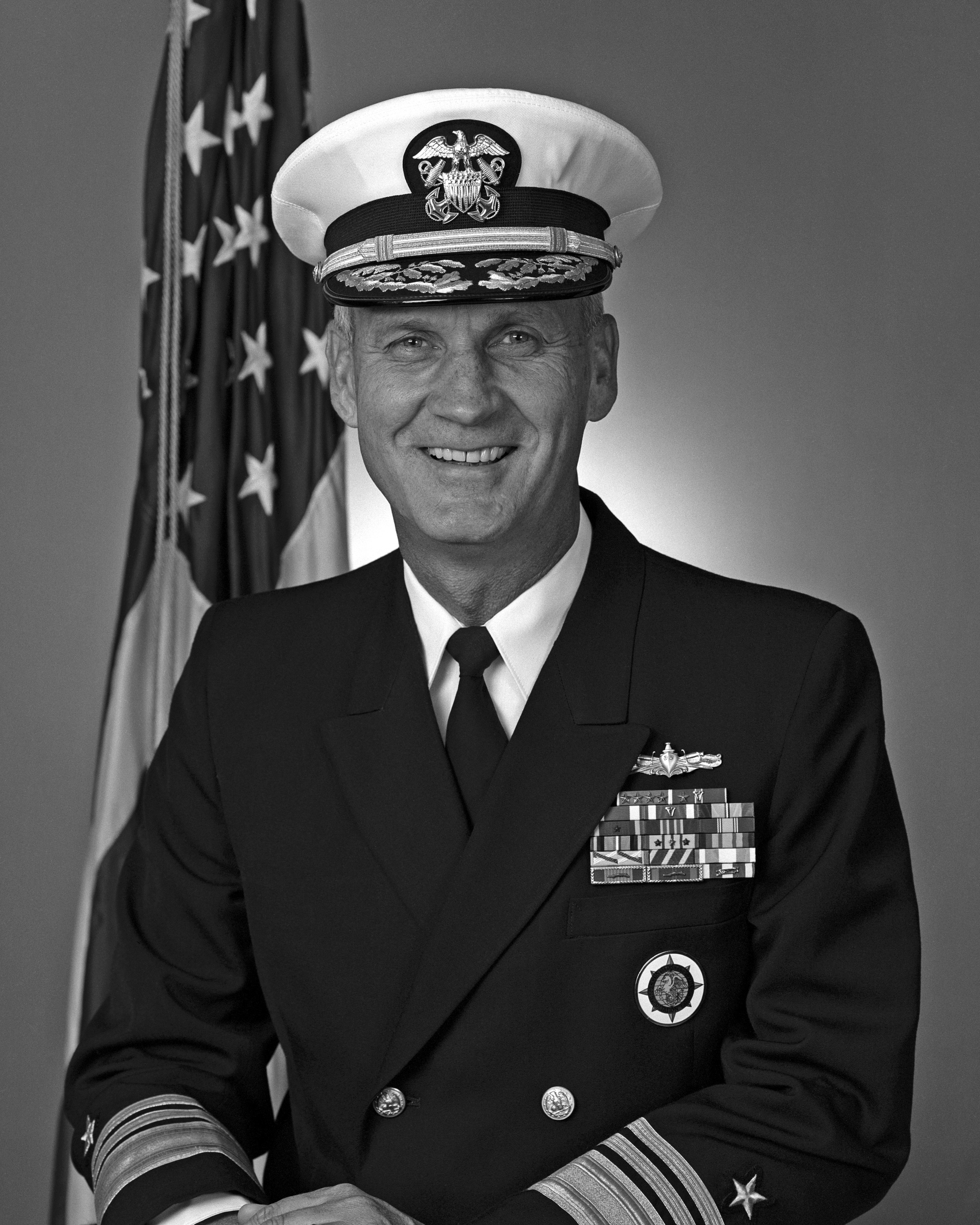

United States Maritime Administrator
- In office September 14, 1993 – June 30, 1997
- President: Bill Clinton
- Preceded by: Warren G. Leback
- Succeeded by: Clyde J. Hart Jr

Personal details
- Born: April 28, 1931 Albany, New York
- Died: August 26, 2022 (aged 91)
- Resting place: Arlington National Cemetery
- Education: United States Merchant Marine Academy (1955)
- Awards: Navy Distinguished Service Medal; Bronze Star; Legion of Merit

Military service
- Allegiance: United States of America
- Branch/service: United States Navy
- Rank: Vice Admiral
- Commands: USS Courtney; USS Waddell; Destroyer Squadron 25; Cruiser-Destroyer Group 2
- Battles/wars: Vietnam War

Albert Joseph Herberger (April 28, 1931 – August 26, 2022) was a Vice Admiral of the United States Navy, and the first United States Merchant Marine Academy graduate to attain the rank.

== Early life ==
Albert J. Herberger was born in Albany, New York. He graduated in 1949 from the Vincentian Institute, a Roman Catholic high school in Albany, where he was one of the two senior class presidents. Herberger then sailed in the Merchant Marine with both Grace Line and United States Lines. He was commissioned an ensign in the U.S. Navy upon graduation from the U.S. Merchant Marine Academy, Kings Point, New York, in February 1955.

On February 26, 1955, Ensign Herberger married Rosemary C. Blair of Albany, New York. The Herbergers have four children: Jeffrey, Mary-Terese, Bethann, and Jon.

== United States Navy ==
His early duty was aboard the patrol boat Rockville, and the cable repair ship Neptune. Herberger then graduated with Class One from the Navy's Destroyer School and began his service in destroyers as Operations Officer aboard Dewey. He completed the engineering science curriculum at the Naval Postgraduate School, Monterey, California, in June 1965 and next served with the Naval Advisory Group, Military Assistance Command, Republic of Vietnam, as advisor to the Vietnamese Navy River Force and later as senior advisor to the Vietnamese Navy.

After duty as Executive Officer of Glennon he assumed command of Courtney in April 1968. Herberger was Director of Training at the Navy Officer Candidate School, Newport, Rhode Island, during 1969-71, before commanding Waddell. After an assignment as Surface Commander Detailer with the Bureau of Naval Personnel, he became Executive Assistant to the Chief of Naval Personnel for Officer Deployment and Distribution in 1974. Herberger served as Commander, Destroyer Squadron 25 from September 1975 to April 1978, and in July 1978 became Deputy Director of the Total Force Management Control and Analysis Division in the Office of the Deputy Chief of Naval Operations (Manpower, Personnel and Training). From December 1979 to March 1981, Herberger served as the Executive Assistant and Naval Aide to the Assistant Secretary of the Navy (Manpower, Reserve Affairs and Logistics).

He assumed flag rank and duty as the Assistant Commander for Distribution, Naval Military Personnel Command in April 1981. From June 1982 until May 1985, he was Director, Military Personnel Policy Division in the Office of the Chief of Naval Operations. Herberger served as Commander, Cruiser-Destroyer Group 2 from June 1985 until July 1986. This group, based at Charleston, South Carolina, consisted of 42 surface ships ranging from cruisers and destroyers to ammunition ships, minesweepers and fleet support activities. From August 1986, he was assigned as the Director for Logistics on the staff of the Commander in Chief, U.S. Atlantic Fleet, and in May 1987 assumed additional duties as Deputy Commander in Chief and Chief of Staff, Atlantic Fleet. From September 1987 to February 1990 he served as Deputy Commander in Chief, Transportation Command, Scott Air Force Base, Illinois.

In April 1989, Admiral Herberger received the "Old Salt" award trophy from the Surface Navy Association which recognized that he was then the longest-serving Surface Warfare Officer qualified Officer of the Deck on active duty. For his military and civilian service he has received numerous awards including: The Defense Distinguished Service Medal; the Legion of Merit with four gold stars: the Department of Defense Medal for Distinguished Public Service: the 1996 Navy League of the United States Vincent T Hirsh Maritime Award; the 1996 Admiral of the Ocean Seas Award and the National Defense Transportation Association Distinguished Government Service Award. In 1993 he was named Kings Pointer of the Year by USMMA Alumni Association.

== Maritime Administration ==
After retirement Herberger served as Administrator of the Maritime Administration (MARAD) of the Department of Transportation from 1993 until 1997.

For his service, as the Maritime Administrator, he has received numerous awards including:

- Department of Defense Medal for Distinguished Public Service
- 1996 Navy League of the United States Vincent T. Hirsch Maritime Award
- 1996 Admiral of the Ocean Seas Award
- National Defense Transportation Association Distinguished Government Service Award.

== Death ==
Herberger died on August 26, 2022, aged 91.

== Military awards ==
- Defense Distinguished Service Medal
- Legion of Merit with four gold stars
- Bronze Star with gold star and combat V

== Dates of rank ==
- Ensign: February 1955
- Rear Admiral: April 1981
- Vice Admiral:

Military offices
New office	Deputy Commander-in-Chief of the United States Transportation Command; 1987–1990	Succeeded by Paul D. Butcher
