= Paul L. Krinsky =

American merchant mariner and sailor (1928–2023)

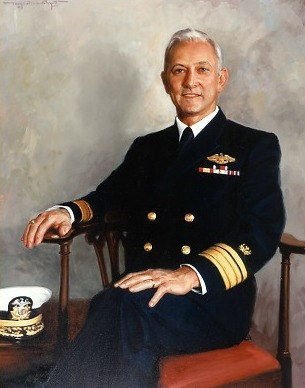
- Official Merchant Marine Academy portrait by Margaret Holland Sargent
- Born: November 9, 1928; Brooklyn, New York, U.S.
- Died: June 17, 2023 (aged 94) Auburn, Maine, U.S.
- Allegiance: United States
- Branch: United States Maritime Service; United States Navy; United States Navy Reserve
- Service years: 43 years
- Rank: Rear Admiral
- Commands: Superintendent, United States Merchant Marine Academy; Deputy Superintendent, United States Merchant Marine Academy; Dean, United States Merchant Marine Academy
- Awards: Superior Accomplishment Award (United States Maritime Administration); Silver Medal Award for Meritorious Service (United States Department of Commerce)

Paul L. Krinsky (November 9, 1928 – June 17, 2023) was an American merchant mariner and sailor. He served as the superintendent of the United States Merchant Marine Academy from 1987 to 1993 and attained the rank of rear admiral.

== Early life and career ==
Paul L. Krinsky was born to Hilda and Nat Krinsky on November 9, 1928.

Krinsky entered the United States Merchant Marine Academy in 1946. He graduated with honors in 1950 and became an ensign. He sailed in the United States Merchant Marines as a deck officer for United States Lines aboard the passenger ships SS America and SS United States. In 1955, Krinsky went on active duty with the United States Navy, serving as navigator aboard the USS Everglades (AD-24). Leaving active duty in 1958, he remained in the United States Naval Reserve and retired as a captain. Krinsky also served as a naval science instructor at the New York State Maritime College.

== Merchant Marine Academy ==
In 1958, Krinsky joined the faculty of the Merchant Marine Academy, teaching a wide range of navigation and seamanship courses in the Department of Nautical Sciences. Over the years, Krinsky held many important posts at the academy, including Director of Admissions, Academic Dean, and Deputy Superintendent. In 1987, Krinsky was appointed superintendent of the Merchant Marine Academy and was made a rear admiral.

== Personal life and death ==
Krinsky was married to Audrey and had two children, Ross and David. He died in Auburn, Maine on June 17, 2023, at the age of 94.

== Awards and decorations ==
- Superior Accomplishment Award (United States Maritime Administration) - NS Savannah Nuclear Project
- Silver Medal Award for Meritorious Service (United States Department of Commerce)
- Naval Reserve Medal
- Armed Forces Reserve Medal
- Navy Occupation Service Medal
- National Defense Service Medal

== Sources ==
- Original text from Library of Congress
- Original text from Library of Congress
- United States Merchant Marine Academy Official Website USMMA Parents Page

Preceded by Thomas A. King	Superintendent of the United States Merchant Marine Academy; 1987-1993	Succeeded by Thomas T. Matteson
