= Philip H. Greene Jr. =

Retired U.S. Navy admiral

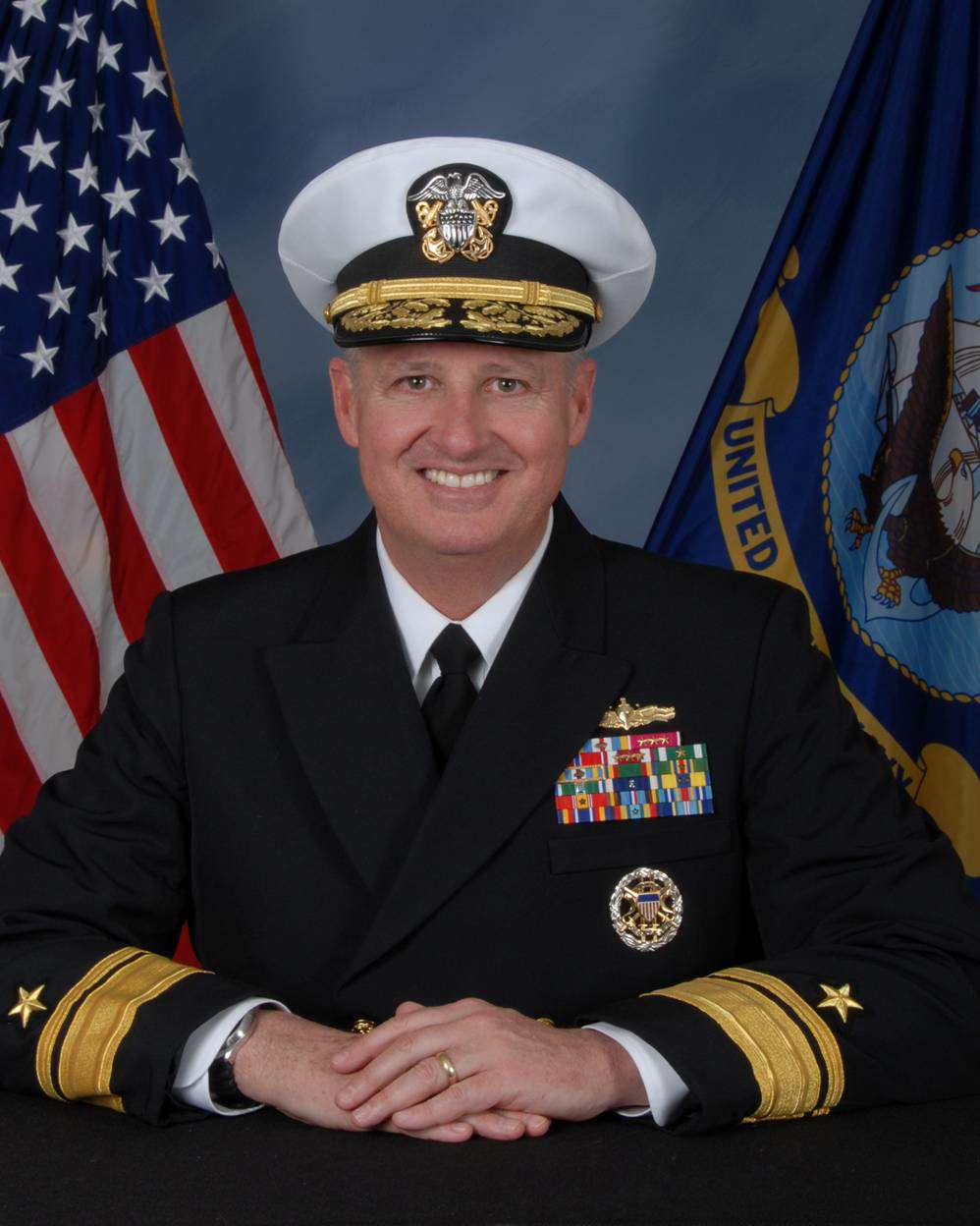
- Military career
- Allegiance: United States
- Branch: United States Navy
- Service years: 1978-2010
- Rank: Rear Admiral
- Commands: Commander Combined Joint Task Force-Horn of Africa (2008-2009); Commanded Destroyer Squadron 31 (2002-2004); Commanded USS Fletcher (DD-992) (1996-1997); Commanded USS Taurus (PHM-3) (1989-1991)
- Conflicts: Iraqi War
- Awards: Defense Superior Service Medal; Legion of Merit (4); Bronze Star Medal; Meritorious Service Medal (4); Navy and Marine Corps Commendation Medal
- Other work: Superintendent USMMA (2010-2011); Department Chair, National Defense University (2011-2012) vice president TOTE, Inc. (2012-2013) president TOTE, Inc. (2013-2019)

Philip H. Greene Jr. is a retired United States Navy rear admiral. He graduated from the United States Merchant Marine Academy in 1978. After retirement, Greene served as the 11th superintendent of the academy from 2010 to 2011. His advanced degrees include an MS in national security strategy from the Naval War College (1994) and an MS in information systems from the Naval Post Graduate School (1985).

Preceded by Rear Admiral Allen B. Worley, USMS	Superintendent US Merchant Marine Academy; 2010-2011	Succeeded by Rear Admiral James A. Helis, USMS
