= Thomas T. Matteson =

- Born: June 15, 1935 (age 90); Upper Sandusky, Ohio
- Allegiance: United States of America
- Branch: USCG
- Service years: 1957–1993
- Rank: Rear admiral
- Commands: Superintendent, US Merchant Marine Academy; Superintendent, US Coast Guard Academy; Chief, Office of Personnel and Training, USCG
- Conflicts: Cuban Missile Crisis (blockade)
- Awards: Legion of Merit; Meritorious Service Medal; United States Naval Aviator badge Armed Forces Expeditionary Medal; Navy Expeditionary Medal; National Defense Service Medal

Rear Admiral Thomas T. Matteson (born June 15, 1935) was appointed Superintendent of the United States Merchant Marine Academy in the summer of 1993 and served in that position until his retirement in August 1998. Matteson had served as superintendent of the United States Coast Guard Academy from June 1989, prior to taking over as superintendent of the Merchant Marine Academy.

== Childhood home and education ==
Matteson is a native of Upper Sandusky, Ohio, and graduated from the Coast Guard Academy in 1957. Matteson subsequently received a master's degree in management science from the Naval Postgraduate School and later in 1977 graduated from the Air War College.

== Other billets ==
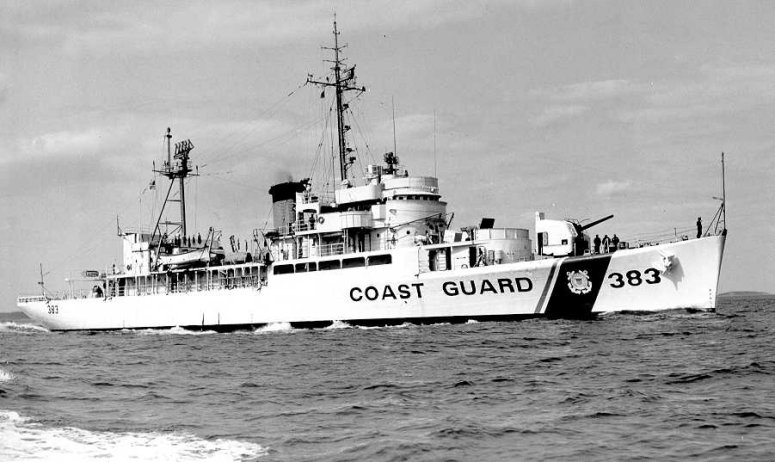

Thomas T. Matteson's first Coast Guard assignment was on the USCGC Castle Rock (WAVP-383), then, the cutter WHEC-383 (pictured at left), which was serving in the Atlantic Ocean. Later a USCG aviator and helicopter pilot, Matteson then entered flight training in 1961 at the Naval Air Station, Pensacola, Florida. His subsequent assignments included postings at Coast Guard air stations in Miami, Port Angeles, Washington, and Puerto Rico, before being named chief of staff for the Eighth Coast Guard District, New Orleans in 1984.

== Decorations and awards ==
Thomas T. Matteson's decorations, awards and other honors include the Legion of Merit, the Meritorious Service Medal, and the NAACP's Roy Wilkins Renown Service Award.

Preceded by Rear Admiral Paul L. Krinsky, USMS	Superintendent, US Merchant Marine Academy; 1993-1998	Succeeded by Vice Admiral Joseph D. Stewart, USMS
