= Strategic Sealift Officer Program =

Membership

The Navy Reserve Flag, flown by ships which have been designated as naval auxiliary vessel by the Secretary of the Navy, and the commanding officer as well as half the licensed officers are members of the Merchant Marine Reserve

The Strategic Sealift Officer Force, previously known as the Merchant Marine Reserve and founded in 1913 as the Naval Auxiliary Reserve, consists of members of the United States Merchant Marine who are also members of the United States Navy. Officers in the Merchant Marine Reserve are entitled to wear the Strategic Sealift Officer Warfare Insignia.

The program was called Merchant Marine Naval Reserve from 1925 to 1938 and Merchant Marine Reserve from 1938 to 2010.
