= United States Merchant Marine Academy =

U.S. service academy

- Motto: Acta Non Verba (Latin)
- Motto in English: Deeds not Words
- Type: U.S. Service Academy
- Established: 1943; 83 years ago
- Superintendent: Rear Admiral Anthony J. "Tony" Ceraolo, USMS
- Dean: Captain James Zatwarnicki Jr, USMS (Acting)
- Commandant of Midshipmen: Captain Mikel E. Stroud, USMS
- Faculty: 85
- Students: 1,011
- Location: Kings Point, New York, United States; 40°48′44″N 73°45′49″W
- Campus: Suburban – 82 acres (330,000 m^{2})
- Colors: Blue and Gray
- Nickname: Mariners
- Sporting affiliations: NCAA Division III – Skyline Conference; MCHC; MAISA; NEWMAC; CC; MetNy
- Mascot: Salty the Sea Eagle
- Website: usmma.edu

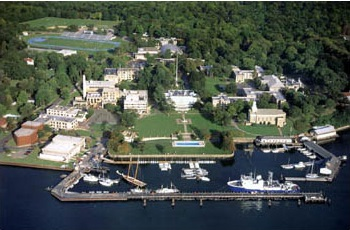
Aerial view of United States Merchant Marine Academy

The United States Merchant Marine Academy (USMMA or Kings Point) is a United States service academy in Kings Point, New York. It trains its midshipmen to serve as officers in the United States Merchant Marine. Graduates are eligible for officer commissions in the uniformed services, including the United States Armed Forces, the NOAA Corps, and the Public Health Service Corps. Midshipmen are trained in marine engineering, science, technology, engineering, and mathematics, navigation, logistics, maritime law, administration, personnel management, international law, customs, and other subjects of the maritime industry.

== History ==
Between 1874 and 1936, diverse federal legislation supported maritime training through school ships, internships at sea, and other methods. A disastrous fire in 1934 aboard the passenger ship SS Morro Castle, in which 134 people died, convinced the U.S. Congress that direct federal involvement in efficient and standardized training was needed.

Originally – and in cooperation with the State of New York, which donated the land – the U.S. government planned to establish a large-scale Merchant Marine Academy at Fort Schuyler, New York; nothing came of these plans. Fort Schuyler would later be used as the grounds for SUNY (State University of New York) Maritime.

Congress passed the landmark Merchant Marine Act in 1936, and two years later, the U.S. Merchant Marine Cadet Corps was established. In that year, the USTS Nantucket (ex-USS Ranger) was transferred from Massachusetts Maritime Academy to Kings Point and renamed the USTS Emory Rice. The first training was given at temporary facilities until the academy's permanent site in Kings Point, New York, was acquired in early 1942. The Kings Point campus was originally Henri Bendel's, later Walter Chrysler's, twelve-acre waterfront estate constructed c. 1916. It was formally titled "Forker House" (now known as the USMMA's Wiley Hall). Also included on the property were numerous other former estates: Sidney H. March's "Claralea," the Thomas Meighan residence, the Joseph Bryan residence, the Bernard D. Cohen residence, and the Walter J. Freeland residence. Much of these houses were part of the 20th century Grenwolde development. Construction of the academy began immediately, and 15 months later the task was virtually completed. The academy was dedicated on 30 September 1943, by President Franklin D. Roosevelt, who noted "the Academy serves the Merchant Marine as West Point serves the Army and Annapolis the Navy."

World War II required the academy to forgo its normal operation and to devote all of its resources toward meeting the emergency need for Merchant Marine officers. Its enrollment rose to 2,700 men, and the planned course of instruction was reduced in length from four years to 18 months. To meet the wartime needs for qualified merchant marine officers two additional merchant marine cadet training school sites were established, one located in Pass Christian, Mississippi, and the other in San Mateo, California. (The San Mateo location was closed in September 1947, and the students transferred to Kings Point. The location in Pass Christian was similarly closed in 1950.) In spite of the war, shipboard training continued to be an integral part of the academy curriculum, and midshipmen served at sea in combat zones the world over. One hundred and forty-two midshipmen gave their lives in service to their country, and many others survived torpedo and aerial attacks. From 1942 to 1945, the academy graduated 6,895 officers. As the war drew to a close, plans were made to convert the academy's wartime curriculum to a four-year, college-level program to meet the peacetime requirements of the merchant marine. In 1948, such a course was instituted.

Authorization for awarding the degree of Bachelor of Science to graduates was granted by Congress in 1949. The academy became fully accredited as a degree-granting institution in the same year. It was made a permanent institution by an Act of Congress in 1956. The academy accelerated graduating classes during the Korean War and the Vietnam War. It was involved in such programs as training U.S. officers for the nuclear-powered merchant ship, the NS Savannah.

Admission requirements were amended in 1974, and the academy became the first federal service academy to enroll female students, two years before the Military, Naval, Air Force, and Coast Guard academies.

Prior to and during the Persian Gulf War in early 1991, academy graduates and midshipmen played important roles in the large sealift of military supplies to the Middle East. Midshipmen training at sea also participated in the humanitarian sealift to Somalia during Operation Restore Hope.

In 1992, the academy acquired its largest campus-based training vessel, the T/V Kings Pointer. After 20 years at the academy, MARAD transferred the ship to the Texas Maritime Academy in Galveston to serve as its new primary training vessel. This was followed by an announcement on 21 August 2012, that the National Aeronautics and Space Administration (NASA) agreed to transfer the MV Liberty Star to the U.S. Department of Transportation for use as the new training vessel at the academy. Before being redesigned to serve as a training vessel for students, the former MV Liberty Star served as a solid rocket booster recovery vessel for NASA retrieving solid rocket boosters following space shuttle launches. In June 2014, the vessel was rechristened the T/V Kings Pointer, the fifth vessel of the academy to carry that name. The rechristening followed the earlier dedication of the academy's newly replaced Mallory Pier.

In the 1990s, the academy's future came into question when it was included in the National Performance Review, chaired by Vice President Al Gore. The report recommended halving the federal subsidy and requiring students to pay half of tuition to reduce costs. Congress soundly rejected the recommendation and voted to continue the prohibitions on charging tuition to students.

During the September 11 attacks, the Merchant Marine Academy assisted in the evacuation of civilians from Lower Manhattan as well as the transportation of first responders and supplies to and from Ground Zero. Midshipman, faculty, and staff from the academy, within hours of the attack, were using boats from the waterfront and sending them to the city. Members of the Merchant Marine Academy participated in the relief efforts for nine days. These efforts were recognized by President George W Bush with the award of the Secretary of Transportation Outstanding Unit Award, the equivalent of the Defense Department’s Presidential Unit Citation.

Merchant Marine Academy midshipmen and graduates have been involved in many facets of the war in Iraq. Many graduates were involved in the transportation of supplies during the buildup to the war in 2003. Many graduates in the U.S. Navy Reserve have been called to active duty to serve supporting naval roles in ports in Iraq and Kuwait. Graduates who have entered other branches of the service have had more direct roles in Iraq. Aaron Seesan, a 2003 graduate and U.S. Army first lieutenant, was the first Academy graduate since the Vietnam War to be killed by enemy action. Since that time, two additional graduates, LTJG Francis L. Toner, IV, USN (class of 2006) and 1st Lt. William N. Donnelly, IV, USMC (class of 2008) died while serving their country in Afghanistan.

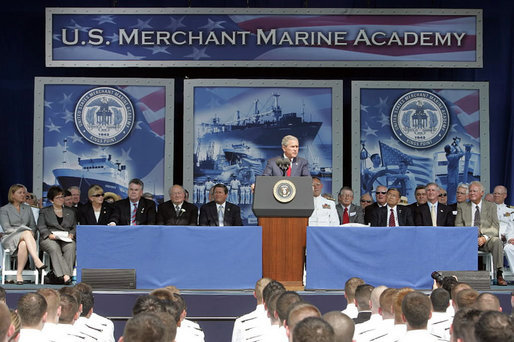
George W. Bush delivering the commencement address at the academy.

Between 2009 and 2014, the Obama Administration invested more than $450 million at the academy, including almost $100 million for capital improvements – the most funding ever secured for physical improvements at the academy.

Because of the service of midshipmen in every major conflict the country has been involved in since World War II, the regiment is privileged to carry a regimental battle standard. The Merchant Marine Academy is the only federal service academy granted the right to do so, and the standard is carried with the colors at all times. Campaign ribbons from all the conflicts in which midshipmen have taken part help to dress the battle standard. The academy’s battle standard is emblazoned with the number "142" representing the number of USMMA midshipmen that have been killed in action since the academy’s inception.

On 19 June 2006, President George W. Bush gave the commencement address at the academy, the first sitting president to visit the academy.

Since 2016, the academy has come under public scrutiny and sharp criticism from lawmakers for alleged sexual assault and harassment within its "Sea Year" program. The program, which places students on commercial vessels, was temporarily suspended in 2016 and again in 2021 for multiple allegations of sexual assault in the program. Following both suspensions, the Department of Transportation and the Maritime Administration implemented new safety standards and reforms.

In 2022, President Joe Biden awarded the Secretary of Transportation Outstanding Unit Award, for a second time, to Academy midshipmen who were in attendance between March 13, 2020 and June 18, 2022 based on the Regiment of Midshipmen’s leadership and relentless efforts to excel on campus, but more importantly for manning the ships during the logistical crisis caused by the COVID-19 pandemic.

== Admissions ==
In addition to requiring strong GPA and SAT/ACT scores, to be eligible to enter the academy a candidate must:

- Be of good moral character.
- Be at least 17 years of age and must not have passed his or her 25th birthday before 1 July in the year of entrance.
- Be a citizen of the United States either by birth or naturalization, except for a limited number of international midshipmen specially authorized by Congress.
- Meet the physical, security and character requirements necessary for appointment as midshipman in the U.S. Navy.
- Obtain a Congressional nomination to the academy from a member of Congress.
- Submit a completed application; and
- Qualify academically.

Medical/Physical Clearance – Candidates are required to pass a DoDMERB (Department of Defense Medical Examination Review Board) physical, and take the Candidate Fitness Assessment (CFA) to assess physical fitness.

Security Clearance – In order to receive a commission at graduation as an officer in the U.S. armed forces, candidates are required to obtain a United States security clearance upon enrollment at the academy. Candidates must first submit a completed Standard Form 86 (Questionnaire for National Security Positions). Candidates must then pass the resulting background investigation.

== Organization ==
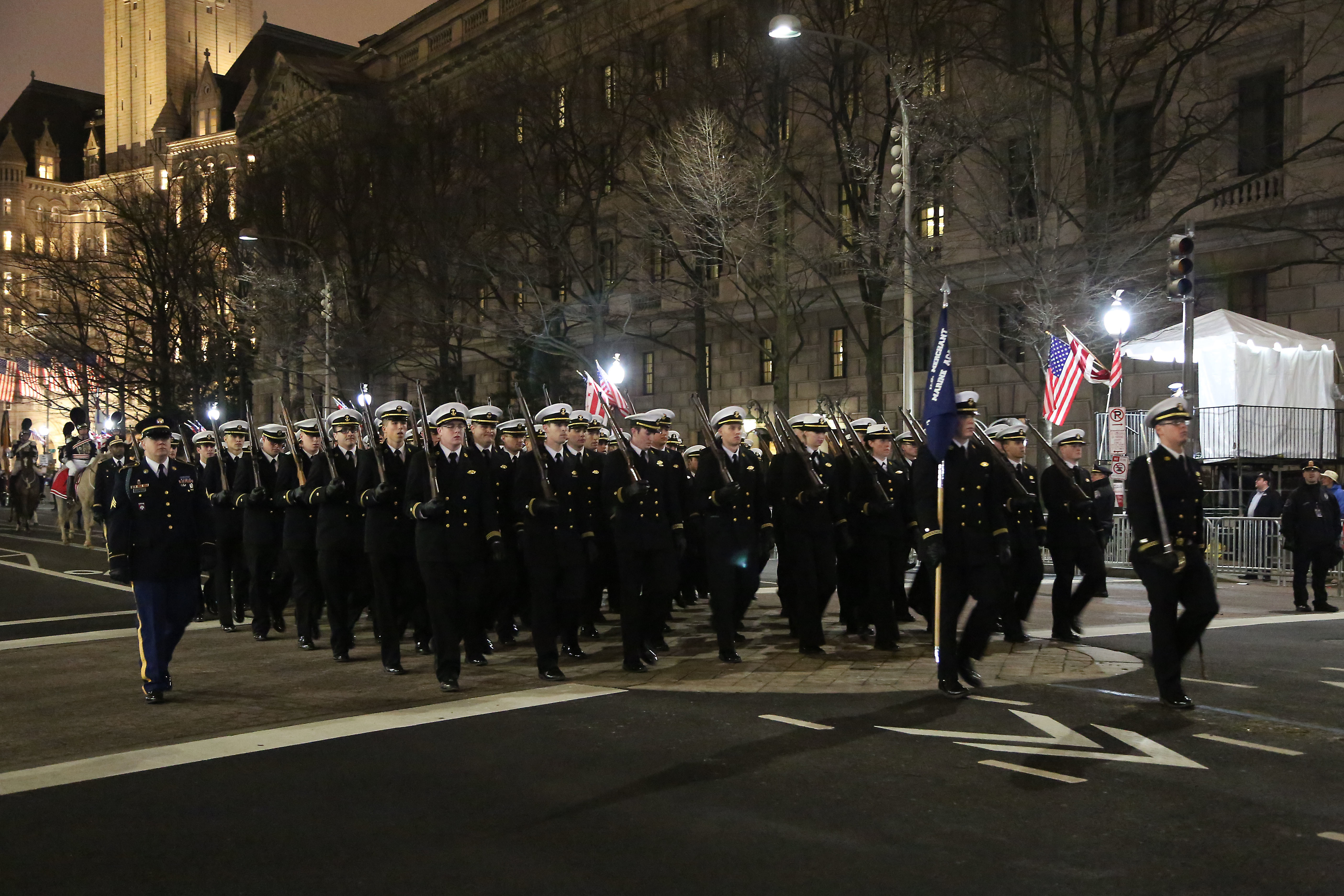
Members of the U.S. Merchant Marine Academy march, during the 58th Presidential Inauguration, Washington, D.C., 20 Jan. 2017.

The academy is administered by the United States Maritime Administration, and has a budget of $82.3 million (FY20) from the United States Department of Transportation.

The entire student body is referred to as the Regiment of Midshipmen and is subdivided into two battalions and six companies (as of 2024). The 1st, 2nd, and 3rd Companies form the 1st Battalion; the Band company, 4th company, and 5th company make up 2nd Battalion. Company assignment is random, although candidates with experience playing a musical instrument are highly considered for joining the Band Company.

=== Regimental Band ===
The United States Merchant Marine Academy Regimental Band serves a dual purpose as both the academy's marching band as well as the official band of the United States Merchant Marine, often playing in official events alongside the other bands of the Armed Forces as well as representing the U.S. Merchant Marine at official events around the country and overseas. The United States Merchant Marine Academy Regimental Band regularly represents the United States Merchant Marine Academy and veterans of the United States Merchant Marine at presidential inauguration parades and other events of national significance.

=== Department of Public Safety ===
The USMMA Department of Public Safety is a full-service law enforcement agency responsible for campus safety and security. The academy has mutual-aid agreements with multiple agencies in both Great Neck and Nassau County, including the Kings Point Police Department, Great Neck Alert Fire Department (fire and rescue coverage), Great Neck Vigilant Fire Department (EMS coverage), and the Nassau County Police Department, as well as investigative support from the Federal Bureau of Investigation. The Department Head is assisted by two federal police officers and two federal guards, with contract security guards utilized to meet minimum manning requirements. Federal police officers, federal guards, and contract guards wear distinct uniforms and perform access control, foot and motor patrols, respond to transmitted fire and security alarms, address safety and security matters, direct traffic, and enforce parking and traffic regulations. The police officers have full arrest authority under federal law (Title 40 United States Code Section 1315), and may also issue federal and New York state summonses, protect persons and property, prevent breaches of the peace, and enforce rules and regulations for the protection of property at the academy. The guards have no arrest authority other than that of an ordinary citizen.

EMS coverage of the academy is also provided by the Regimental Emergency Service Squad. This is a certified New York State EMS department under the Chief Medical Officer at the academy. The squad contains about 100 midshipman at a time who volunteer to take the EMT-B class and staff the department. The squad has one ambulance housed at Patten Medical Clinic on campus.

== Curriculum ==
Admitted appointees enter as "candidates" in early July, and begin a two-and-a-half-week indoctrination period, or "indoc", run by upperclass instructors and supervised by United States Maritime Service officers of the Commandant of Midshipman's staff. It is a high-stress, intensive introduction to regimental life at the academy including physical training, history, customs and courtesies, and drill and ceremony. After indoc, the candidates earn the title of "plebe candidates". The academic year begins in late July, and on Acceptance Day in September, plebe candidates are sworn into the U.S. Navy Reserve and join the regiment as plebes. As plebes they are subject to stringent rules that govern daily life until the following spring, when they are recognized as midshipmen, fourth class, with eased restrictions and additional privileges.

The following academic programs (Bachelor of Science 4-year degree programs) are offered at USMMA:

- Marine Transportation
- Maritime Logistics and Security
- Marine Engineering
- Marine Engineering Systems
- Marine Engineering and Shipyard Management

These five majors can be grouped as follows:

- The two "Deck Majors" are Marine Transportation and Maritime Logistics and Security. Marine transportation students learn about ship navigation, cargo handling, navigation rules and maritime law. These majors grant midshipman a Third Mate license for work on steam or motor vessels of unlimited tonnage.
- The three "Engine Majors" are Marine Engineering, Marine Engineering Systems, and Marine Engineering and Shipyard Management. Marine engineering students learn about the function of the ship's engines and its supporting systems. These majors lead to the issuance of Third Assistant Engineer (3 A/E – Engineering Officer) licenses for steam and motor vessel of any horsepower. Marine Engineering Systems, and Marine Engineering and Shipyard Management, graduates are also qualified to sit for the Engineer in Training (EIT) examination administered by the National Council of Examiners for Engineering and Surveying (NCEES).

For portions of their sophomore (third-class) and junior (second-class) years, midshipmen serve as cadets on U.S. merchant ships. Midshipmen are typically assigned as pairs to a ship, an engineering cadet and a deck cadet, and operate as part of the crew, gaining hands-on experience as well as the opportunity to travel abroad to foreign ports; the average midshipman travels to eighteen countries during the three-hundred-day training period. This practical training results in an extended academic year that runs from late July to mid-June.

Toward the end of 1st class (senior) year, midshipmen prepare for U.S. Coast Guard exams for a mandatory license as Third Assistant Engineer (steam and motor unlimited HP) or Third Mate (any gross tons, oceans).

== Athletics ==
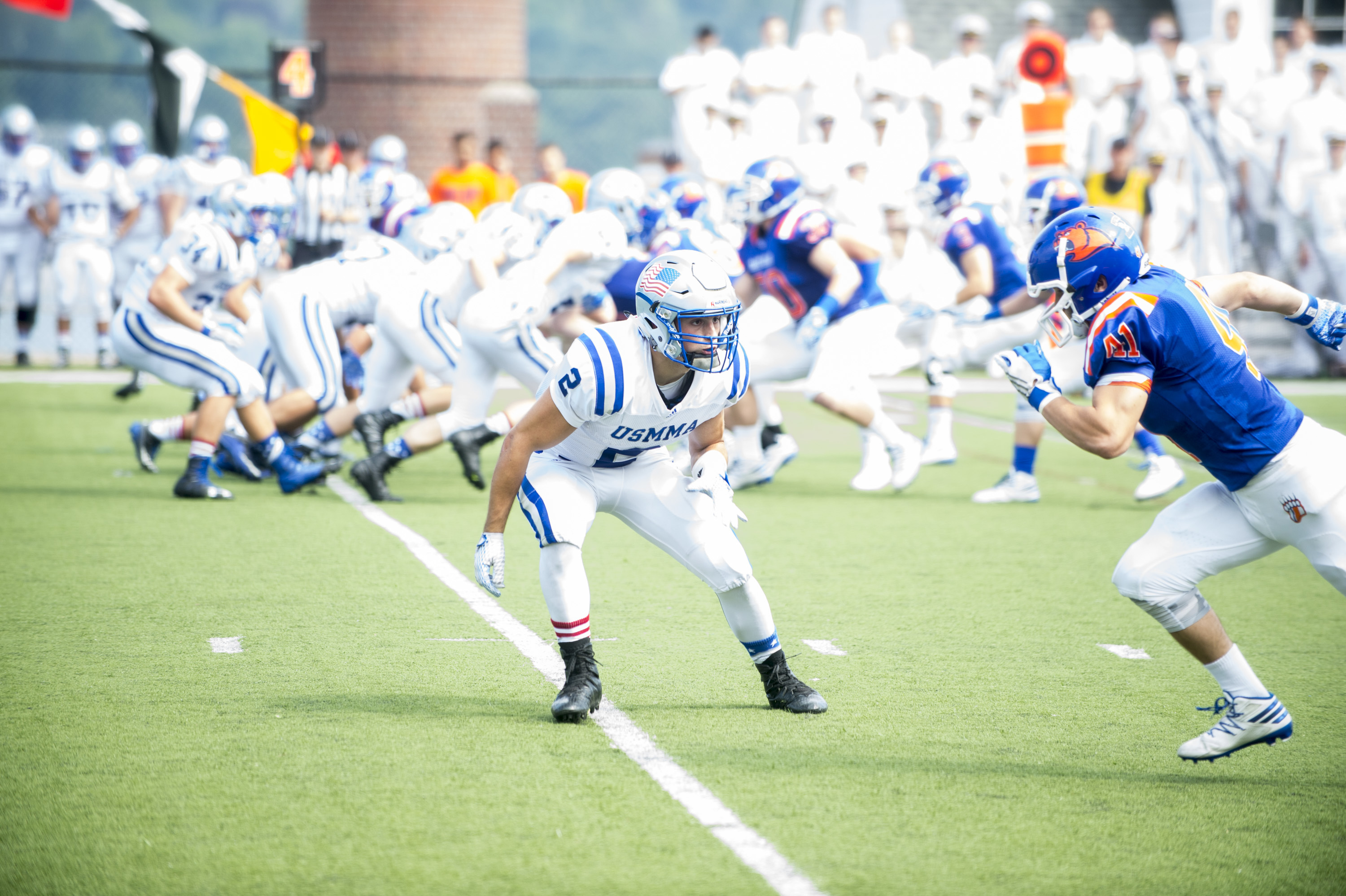
Secretaries Cup Rivalry football game between the Merchant Marine Academy and Coast Guard Academy

The USMMA Mariners compete in Division III of the NCAA, as a member of the Skyline Conference in all sports (men's sports include baseball, basketball, cross country, lacrosse, soccer, swimming & diving, tennis, and track & field; women's sports include basketball, cross country, lacrosse, swimming & diving, track & field, and volleyball) except in football, where they are an associate member of the New England Women's and Men's Athletic Conference, and collegiate wrestling, where they are a member of the Centennial Conference. The USMMA was a member of the Skyline Conference until the 2006–07 season; the USMMA returned to the Skyline Conference for the 2016–17 academic year. The academy was also a charter member in the Landmark Conference from 2007 until 2016.

== Distinguished midshipmen ==
The Merchant Marine Distinguished Service Medal is the highest award which can be bestowed upon members of the United States Merchant Marine and is the service's equivalent of the Medal of Honor. Since mariners serving in the U.S. Merchant Marine are not directly employed by the Department of Defense, they are not eligible for the Medal of Honor.

Since USMMA opened in 1943, eight midshipmen have been awarded the Merchant Marine Distinguished Service Medal.

- Midshipman Francis A. Dales,
- Midshipman Elmer C. Donnelly,
- Midshipman Carl M. Medved – Awarded posthumously,
- Midshipman Edwin Joseph O'Hara – Awarded posthumously,
- Midshipman Walter G. Sittmann,
- Midshipman William M. Thomas, Jr.,
- Midshipman Phil Cox Vannais, and
- Midshipman Frederick R. Zito.

== Post-graduation service obligations ==
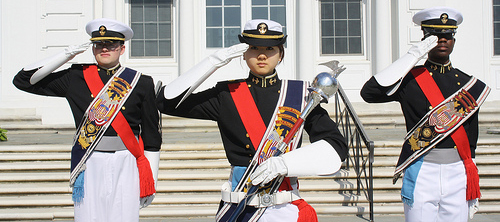
Field officers of the United States Merchant Marine Academy Regimental Band

Midshipmen at Kings Point have a wide variety of options upon graduation. Unlike the nation's other federal service academies, graduates of USMMA are required to fulfill their service obligation on their own by providing annual proof of employment in a wide variety of occupations as approved by MARAD for a specified period of time.

Graduates may elect to fulfill their service obligation by working as licensed officers on U.S.-flagged merchant vessels, as civilians in the maritime industry, or as active duty officers in any branch of the military or the uniformed services of the United States, including the Public Health Service and the National Oceanic Atmospheric Administration. Regardless, graduates are required to maintain their U.S. Coast Guard-issued merchant marine officer's license for a period of at least 6 years.

Those graduates electing to enter the civilian work force in the maritime industry, and those sailing in the Merchant Marine, are also required to maintain their Navy Reserve commission (or another reserve component commission in the Army National Guard or Reserve, Marine Corps Reserve, Air Force National Guard or Reserve, or Coast Guard Reserve) for a period of at least 8 years after their commissioning as officers, and are required to serve in the maritime industry for at least 5 years following graduation.

- On average about 1/3 of each graduating class goes to sea working in the Merchant Marine serving with the Military Sealift Command (part of the U.S. Navy) and the National Defense Reserve Fleet or on various U.S.-flagged ships in international trade, inland & near-coastal transportation, research vessels, and other types of vessels.
- Another 1/3 generally go to work in the U.S. maritime industry ashore working in commercial shipping, ship broking, ship repair, intermodal logistics, marine engineering, maritime law, maritime insurance, or defense contracting.
- About 1/3 enter the military as active duty commissioned officers in the Uniformed Services. Of those going on active duty, most enter the Navy as naval aviators, naval flight officers, surface warfare officers, submarine officers, or occasionally even as SEALs. Many midshipmen enter the Coast Guard, while others enter the Marine Corps, Army, Air Force, United States Space Force, and their Reserve or National Guard components. Midshipmen may also apply for National Oceanic and Atmospheric Administration (NOAA) with the NOAA Commissioned Corps.
- Those graduates who sail in the U.S. Merchant Marine or work ashore in the U.S. Maritime Industry will receive a Navy reserve commission as Strategic Sealift Officers.

A graduate from USMMA receives upon graduation:

- A Bachelor of Science degree,
- An Unlimited USCG License as a Merchant Marine Officer, either 3rd Mate or 3rd Assistant Engineer, and
- A Commission as an ensign in the U.S. Navy Reserve Strategic Sealift Officer Program (see: Navy Reserve Merchant Marine Insignia), or if accepted on Active Duty, as an ensign in the U.S. Navy, U.S. Coast Guard, or National Oceanic and Atmospheric Administration, or as a 2nd lieutenant in the U.S. Marine Corps, U.S. Army, U.S. Air Force, or U.S. Space Force. Graduates who choose military service must serve at least five years in the active duty force of their respective service.

== American Merchant Marine Museum ==
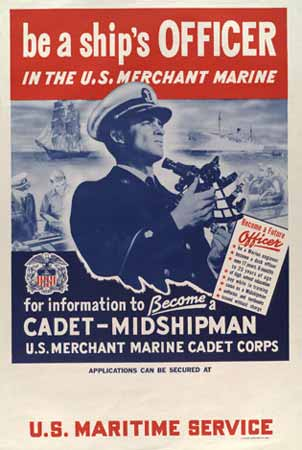
Maritime Service recruiting poster from WWII.

The USMMA in Kings Point, New York is the home of the American Merchant Marine Museum. The museum houses:

- A learning center which is open to the regiment and the public
- The academy's collection of maritime art and artifacts
- Exhibits, including:
  - The only known back-acting engine still in existence, that of the former gunboat USS Ranger
  - The National Maritime Hall of Fame (the only permanent exhibit of its kind in the nation), which honors people and ships important to American oceanic, coastal, inland waterways, and Great Lakes shipping. Inductees into the Hall of Fame must be deceased, or sunk or scrapped, for at least five years. Only one person and one ship are inducted into the Hall of Fame each year. The Hall inducted its first set of members in or about 1982.

Among the museum's many items are the world's largest collection of navigation and nautical instruments, and the only extensive selection of ship's china, on display anywhere in the world. In addition, one of the five surrender swords presented by the Japanese to General of the Army Douglas MacArthur at the conclusion of World War II is housed there.

== Superintendents ==
No.	Portrait	Superintendent	Rank	Term start	Term end	Ref.
1		James Harvey Tomb	Captain USN	1942	1943	
2		Giles C. Stedman	Rear Admiral USNR	1943	1946	
3		Richard R. McNulty	Vice Admiral USMS	1946	1948	
4		Gordon McLintock	Vice Admiral USMS	1948	1970	
5		Arthur B. Engel	Rear Admiral USCG	1970	1980	
6		Thomas A. King	Rear Admiral USMS	1980	1987	
7		Paul L. Krinsky	Rear Admiral USMS	1987	1993	
8		Thomas T. Matteson	Rear Admiral USMS	1993	1998	
9		Joseph D. Stewart	Vice Admiral USMS	1998	2008	
10		Allen B. Worley	Rear Admiral USMS	2009	2010	
Acting		Shashi N. Kumar		2010	2010	
11		Philip H. Greene, Jr.	Rear Admiral USMS	30 August 2010	2011	
Acting		Shashi N. Kumar		2011	2012	
12		James A. Helis	Rear Admiral USMS	30 July 2012	2018	
13		Jack Buono	Vice Admiral USMS	9 November 2018	18 June 2022	
Acting		Susan Dunlap (Note: Deputy Superintendent performing the duties of the Superintendent.)	Rear Admiral USMS	June 2022	December 2022	
14		Joanna M. Nunan	Vice Admiral USMS	8 December 2022	23 June 2025	
Acting		Anthony J. Ceraolo	Captain USMS	24 June 2025	11 January 2026	
15		Anthony J. Ceraolo	Rear Admiral USMS	12 January 2026	Present	

Table notes:

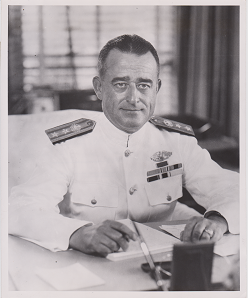
3rd Supt. Then-Rear Admiral Richard McNulty

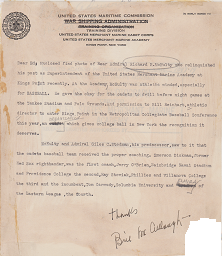

Above right is the academy photograph of Rear Admiral Richard Robert McNulty. As commodore of the U.S. Merchant Marine Cadet Corps of the U.S. Maritime Commission from 1938 to 1948 and for decades prior, he advocated for creation of the academy. The USMMA community considers McNulty to be the academy's "father". He was the academy's third superintendent. The letter appearing right is from the academy's early history and accompanied the photograph. The letter from the United States Merchant Marine Academy explains how, as the academy's third superintendent, Rear Admiral McNulty, strongly supported cadet sports, especially, baseball. The Academic Dean, Shashi Kumar, Master Mariner served as acting superintendent between Admirals Worley and Greene and again between Greene and Helis. Rear Admiral Susan Dunlap, the deputy superintendent, serving as acting superintendent between Buono and Nunan.

== Congressional Board of Visitors ==
In accordance with 46 USC § 51312, The Board of Visitors to the United States Merchant Marine Academy provides independent advice and recommendations on matters relating to the United States Merchant Marine Academy to the President of the United States and the United States Congress. The 19-member board is composed of members of Congress, academy alumni, and stakeholders from the federal government and the maritime industry. Specifically:

- 2 Senators appointed by the chair of the Senate Committee on Commerce, Science, and Transportation;
- 1 Senator appointed by the Vice President of the United States from the Senate Appropriations Committee;
- 3 members of the House of Representatives appointed by the chair of the United States House Committee on Armed Services;
- 2 members of the House of Representatives appointed by the Speaker of the House of Representatives, at least 1 of whom shall be a member of the House Appropriations Committee;
- 5 individuals appointed by the President, at least 2 of which shall be graduates of the academy, at least 1 shall be a senior corporate officer from a United States maritime shipping company, and 1 or more may be a Senate-confirmed presidential appointee, a member of the Senior Executive Service, or any officer of flag-rank who from the U.S. Coast Guard, the National Oceanic and Atmospheric Administration (NOAA), or any of the military services that commission graduates of the academy; and
- 6 ex officio members:
  - the commander of the U.S. Navy Military Sealift Command;
  - the Deputy Commandant for Operations of the U.S. Coast Guard;
  - the chair of the Senate Committee on Commerce, Science, and Transportation;
  - the chair of the United States House Committee on Armed Services;
  - the chair of the USMMA Academic Advisory Board; and—the member of the House of Representatives for the congressional district in which the academy is located, as a nonvoting member—Chairmanship is rotated on a biannual basis between a member of the House of Representatives and a member of the Senate.

=== Meetings of the board ===
The board is required to meet at least quarterly, in accordance with their charter, including at least 1 meeting held at the academy on a date selected by the board in consultation with the Secretary of Transportation and the Superintendent of the academy. However, board members, in cooperation with the Superintendent, may make other visits to the academy in connection with the duties of the board. While visiting the academy under this subsection, members of the board shall have reasonable access to the grounds, facilities, midshipmen, faculty, staff, and other personnel of the academy for the purpose of carrying out the duties of the board.

=== Responsibility of the board ===
The board shall inquire into the state of morale and discipline, the curriculum, instruction, physical equipment, fiscal affairs, and academic methods of the academy, and other matters relating to the academy that the board decides to consider.

Not later than 60 days after each annual visit to the academy, the board shall submit to the President of the United States, a written report of its actions, views, and recommendations pertaining to the academy. If the members of the board make other visits to the academy, the board may prepare a report on such visit; and if approved by a majority of the members of the board, submit such report to the President not later than 60 days after the date of the approval. Any report submitted to the President will be concurrently submitted to the Secretary of Transportation, the Committee on Commerce, Science, and Transportation of the Senate, and the Committee on Armed Services of the House of Representatives.

(Pub. L. 109–304, §8(b), 6 Oct. 2006, 120 Stat. 1575; Pub. L. 113–291, div. C, title XXXV, §3504(a), 19 Dec. 2014, 128 Stat. 3905.)

== Notable alumni ==
Notable United States Merchant Marine Academy alumni include:

Albert J. Herberger
Vice admiral and former Maritime Administrator

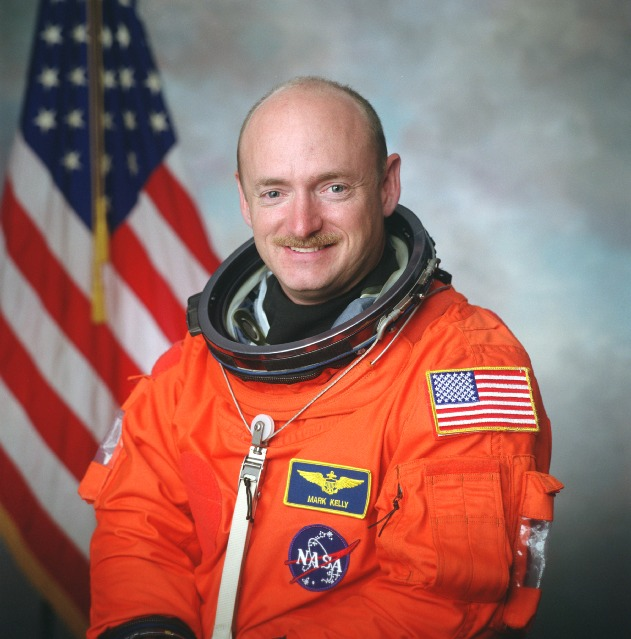
Mark Kelly
U.S. Senator and former NASA astronaut

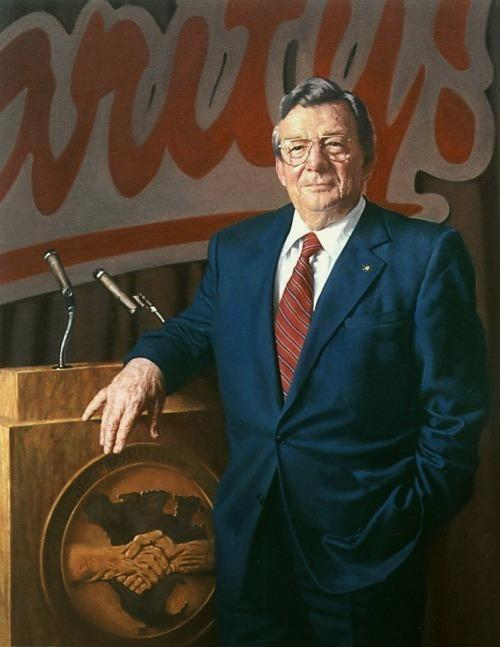
Lane Kirkland
President of the AFL-CIO

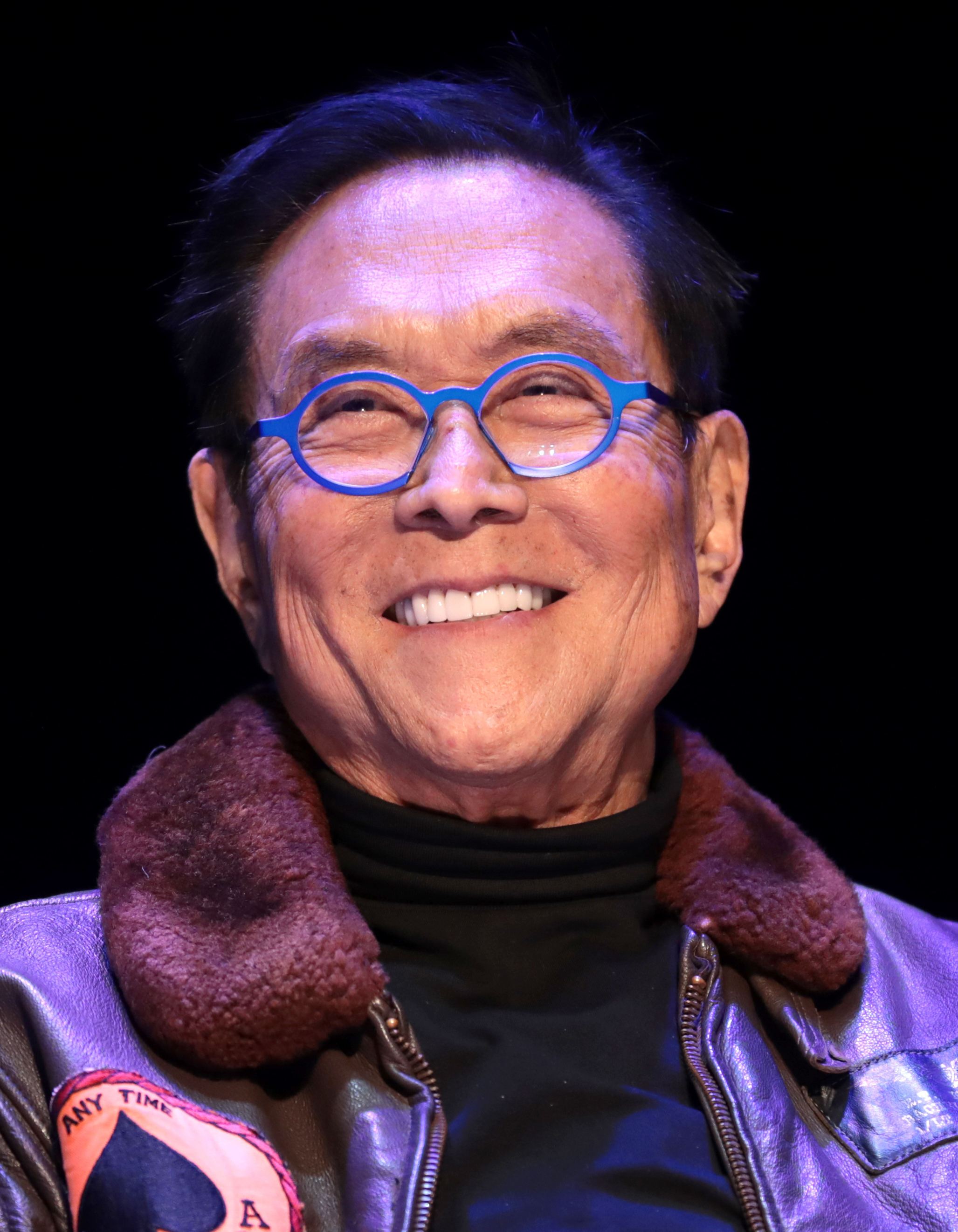
Robert Kiyosaki
Entrepreneur, author of Rich Dad Poor Dad

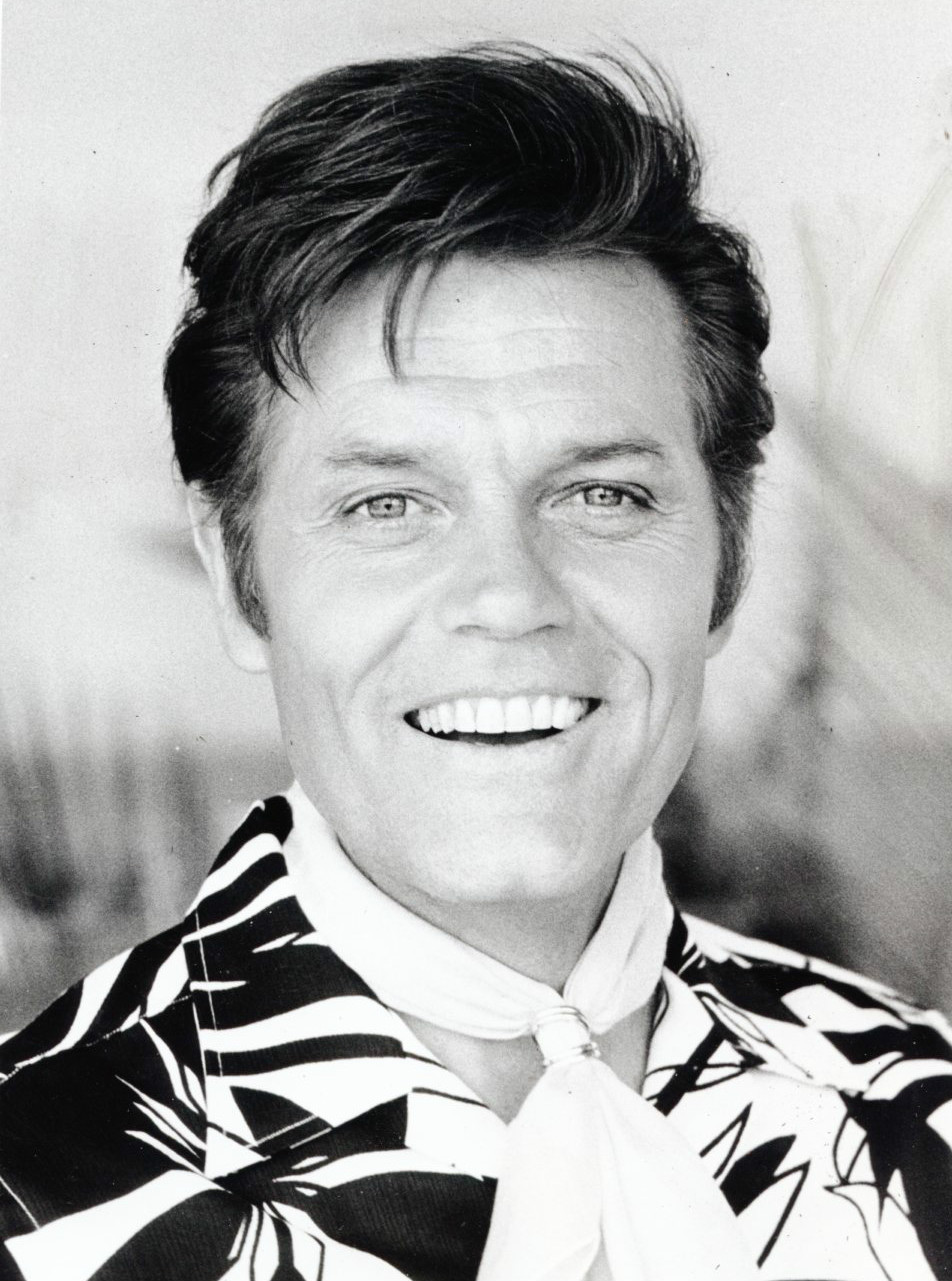
Jack Lord
Actor, star of Hawaii Five-O

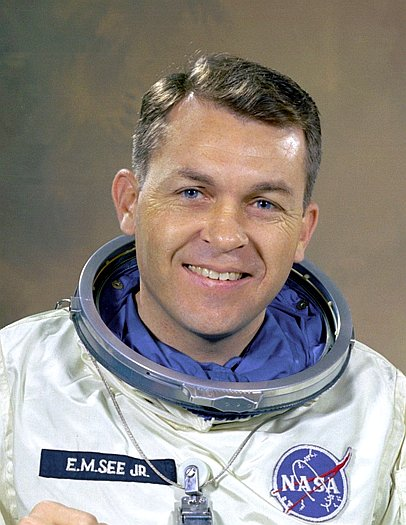
Elliot See
NASA astronaut
- Lane Kirkland (1942) – U.S. labor union leader who served as President of the AFL-CIO for over 16 years.
- Robert H. Scarborough (1944) – first graduate to become a vice admiral in the United States Coast Guard; Vice Commandant of the United States Coast Guard; inducted into USMMA Hall of Distinguished Graduates in 1997.
- Theodore "Ted" Taylor (1944) – author of over 50 fiction and non-fiction books; best known for his 1969 novel The Cay.
- Dean White (1945) – Chairman and CEO of Whiteco Industries, Inc, Hotel/display sign magnate, Member of Fortune 500; philanthropist; the Dean and Barbara White Admissions Center at USMMA is named in his honor; inducted into USMMA Hall of Distinguished Graduates in 2006.
- Jack Lord (1945) – American television, film and Broadway actor, director and producer. He starred as Steve McGarrett in the CBS television program Hawaii Five-O, which ran from 1968 to 1980.
- John Diebold (1946) – author of the book Automation (1954); established DieBold Group in 1961 designed and installed the first electronic banking network. Inducted into USMMA Hall of Distinguished Graduates in 2003.
- Thomas William McNamara (1948) – United States Navy rear admiral
- Elliot See (1949) – Project Gemini astronaut; killed in training; inducted into USMMA Hall of Distinguished Graduates in 1999.
- William B. Morgan (1950) – distinguished naval architect and marine engineer who revolutionized propeller design; 50-year career with the U.S. Navy David Taylor Model Basin; inducted into USMMA Hall of Distinguished Graduates in 2008.
- Romulo Espaldon (1950) – first rear admiral of the Philippine Navy; First commander of the Philippine Southern Command; First governor of Tawi-Tawi province; First congressman of Tawi-Tawi; First regional commissioner of Western Mindanao; First minister of Muslim Affairs; Ambassador to Egypt and Saudi Arabia; Inducted into USMMA Hall of Distinguished Graduates in 1995.
- Albert J. Herberger (1955) – first graduate to become a vice admiral in the United States Navy; Administrator, U.S. Maritime Administration under President Bill Clinton; inducted into USMMA Hall of Distinguished Graduates in 2000.
- George Oster (1961) – professor of mathematical biology, University of California; MacArthur Fellow; member National Academy of Science.
- Robert Kiyosaki (1969) – author of the Rich Dad, Poor Dad books; Marine Corps helicopter gunship pilot during the Vietnam War.
- Skip Prosser (1972) – men's basketball coach at Loyola (Md.), Xavier University and Wake Forest University.
- Joe Rizzo (1973) – "Orange Crush" Denver Broncos linebacker; starting Broncos linebacker in Super Bowl XII.
- Mark H. Buzby (1979) – rear admiral, U.S. Navy; Administrator, U.S. Maritime Administration (2017–2021); Commander, Military Sealift Command; former Deputy Director Expeditionary Warfare; Commander, Joint Task Force, Guantanamo; Commanding Officer, USS Carney (DDG-64) and DESRON-31.
- Sean Connaughton (1983) – administrator, U.S. Maritime Administration (2006–2009), Virginia Secretary of Transportation (2010–2013).
- Morgan Reeser (1984) – silver medalist, 1992 Olympics – Sailing, 470 Class; National Champion Multiple Times; Two-time College Sailor of the Year (1983, 1984).
- Mark E. Kelly (1986) – U.S. senator; Captain, U.S. Navy; pilot, STS-108 Space Shuttle Endeavour, STS-121 Space Shuttle Discovery, STS-124 Space Shuttle Discovery.
- Ken Schwaber, co-creator of the Scrum software development methodology and co-founder of Scrum.org
- Jennifer Boykin (1986) – president of Newport News Shipbuilding, Vice President of Huntington Ingalls Industries.
- Sean Marshall (1987) – former child actor, star of Disney's Pete's Dragon.
- Johnny Wolfe (1988) – vice admiral, U.S. Navy, Director for Strategic Systems Programs
- David "Dubs" Wright (2004) – laser sailor, 2002 National Champion. All American 2003. Represented Canada in 2012 London Olympic Games.

=== Non-graduate alumni ===
- Andrew Card – former White House Chief-of Staff
- Henry Way Kendall – Nobel Laureate in Physics (1990)
- Gray H. Miller – Senior United States District Judge of the United States District Court for the Southern District of Texas
- Carroll O'Connor – actor who portrayed Archie Bunker on All in the Family
- Martin Lewis Perl – Nobel Laureate in Physics (1995)
- Jordan Weisman – American game designer

== Notable faculty ==
- Kenneth R. Force – musician; director of the USMMA regimental band (1971–2016)
- Clark G. Reynolds – historian; professor of history and head of the USMMA Department of Humanities (1976–1978)

== See also ==
- List of maritime colleges
- List of maritime museums in the United States
- Navy Reserve Merchant Marine Insignia
- The Olmsted Scholar Program
- U.S. Department of Transportation
- U.S. Department of Defense
- United States Maritime Service
  - U.S. Maritime Administration
  - United States Merchant Marine
  - United States Merchant Marine Academy Regimental Band
- United States service academies
  - United States Air Force Academy (USAFA)
  - United States Coast Guard Academy (USCGA)
  - United States Merchant Marine Academy (USMMA)
  - United States Military Academy (USMA; Army)
  - United States Naval Academy (USNA)
- Vice Admiral Emory S. Land, USN. Instrumental in overseeing founding of Academy

== Notes ==
While "cadet" and "midshipman" are frequently used interchangeably to refer to students at USMMA, to do so is incorrect. The terms serve two different purposes—the term "midshipman" refers to a military rank, whereas the term "cadet" refers to a job description, much the same way the term "captain" is used for any officer in command of a ship regardless of actual rank. Examples: Midshipman Smith is the deck cadet on the SS Kauai, Midshipman Jones is the engine cadet. Traditionally USMMA students are called "midshipmen" on land and "cadets" during Sea Year.
