= Navy Reserve Merchant Marine Insignia =

US Navy Reserve insignia, 1913–2011

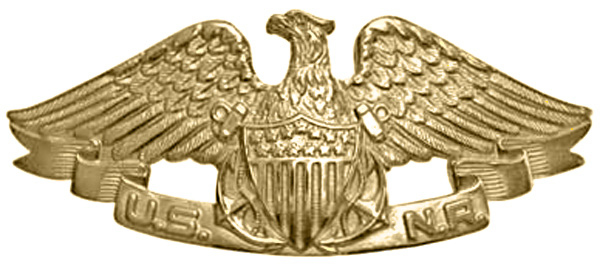
Naval Reserve Merchant Marine Insignia

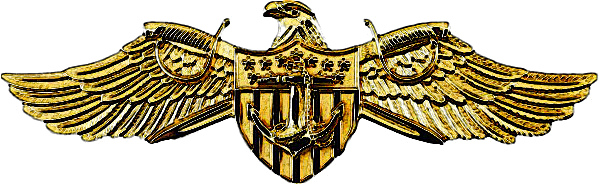
Strategic Sealift Officer Warfare Insignia

Naval Reserve Merchant Marine Insignia was a breast insignia of officers in the United States Merchant Marine who also served in the United States Navy or United States Navy Reserve. The insignia was replaced by the Strategic Sealift Officer Warfare Insignia (SSOWI) in June 2011, per OPNAVINST 1534.1D.

The Merchant Marine Reserve had its beginnings in 1913 when it was called the Naval Auxiliary Reserve. The original merchant marine insignia was prescribed in "Changes in Uniform Regulations, United States Navy, 1913 No. 10." Uniforms for the entire Naval Reserve were authorized by Congress on 31 March 1915 as the possibility of U.S. involvement in World War I increased.

The Naval Auxiliary Reserve, comprising officers and unlicensed seamen, was the beginning of the present Merchant Marine Reserve Program. Merchant marine officers at that time wore their steamship line or company uniform with the Naval Auxiliary Reserve device on the collar of the military coat, or on the lapels of the box coat. The Naval Auxiliary Reserve device was a miniature of the commissioned officers cap device.

== History ==
In 1925, the Naval Auxiliary Reserve was renamed the Merchant Marine Naval Reserve. The name was changed to the Merchant Marine Reserve in 1938 and later the Strategic Sealift Officer Program. The breast insignia of the present Merchant Marine Reserve, U. S. Naval Reserve (Eagle and Scroll) was approved for wear on merchant marine uniforms on 7 April 1938, by Secretary of the Navy, Claude A. Swanson. It replaced the miniature cap device. The authorization for the insignia was the Merchant Marine Act of 1936, which states:

"Licensed officers who are members of the United States Naval Reserve shall wear on their uniforms such special distinguishing insignia as may be approved by the Secretary of the Navy."

In April 1938, at a conference chaired by Captain Chester W. Nimitz, U.S. Navy, Assistant Chief of the Bureau of Navigation, the new insignia was presented to the four heads of the state maritime school ships. The insignia was accepted at this meeting along with the inclusion of naval subjects in the regular course of instruction at the schools. This was the beginning of the Naval Science Departments at the maritime academies.

Regulations require the insignia to be a "gold embroidered or bronze gold plated metal pin consisting of a spread eagle surcharged with crossed anchors and shield." It is underset with a scroll bearing the letters "U.S." on one side of the shield and "N.R." on the other side. Originally, this insignia was to be worn on the merchant marine uniform.

The eagle design is based on the original eagle carved into the stern of the USS Constitution, which reflected the country's determination to remain free. The scroll pattern was often found on the sterns of ships and contained the ships' names. The shield has 13 stars and stripes with crossed anchors and was taken from the U.S. Navy officer's cap device which was first authorized in 1869. Following the design of the cap device, the original merchant marine insignia had the eagle looking to its own left. In 1941, Secretary of the Navy, Frank Knox decreed that all Navy insignia bearing eagles were to have the heads facing to their own right.

Beginning in 1942, Merchant Marine Academy midshipman were authorized wear of the Navy Reserve Merchant Marine Insignia and could automatically display this badge on U.S. Navy uniforms upon acceptance of a commission as a reserve naval officer. By the 1990s, especially in light of the somewhat rigorous training requirements for the Surface Warfare Badge, the badge had drawn a negative connotation and was often referred to as the "Sea Chicken". The Surface Warfare Officers School (SWOS) prohibited display of the badge by its students in 1998 and in 2011 the Navy discontinued the badge all together.

Afterwards, the new Strategic Sealift Officer Warfare Insignia was issued for merchant marine naval reserve officers, with this badge having qualification standards more identical with the standard surface warfare training pipeline.

== Current usage ==
Beginning in 1942 the Secretary of the Navy authorized all US naval reserve midshipmen who were enrolled at the United States Merchant Marine Academy (USMMA) to wear the USNR/MMR warfare pin. However, this rule was rescinded in 2011 when the final qualification for designation as a Navy Strategic Sealift Officer was changed. Presently, all US Navy Reserve Midshipmen at the United States Merchant Marine Academy wear the modified device of the former USNR/MMR insignia that no longer has the "USNR" letters on it. The new SSOP rules do not allow Strategic Sealift midshipmen to wear the SSOP insignia until after final qualification following graduation.

According to U.S. Navy Instructions, in order to qualify for the new SSOWI, candidates shall:

- Obtain a commission as an officer in the U.S. Navy or Navy Reserve at a minimum rank of ensign through one of the following sources:
  - Graduation from the USMMA at Kings Point, NY or one of the state maritime academies in Maine, Massachusetts, New York, Texas, California, or at the Great Lakes Maritime Academy.
  - Successfully complete the Naval Science curriculum while serving under a training and service agreement.
- Direct appointment of officers, under standards established by the Commander, Navy Recruiting Command, who possess an active U.S. Coast Guard (USCG) unlimited officer credential at the minimum level of a chief mate or first assistant engineer with current standards of training, certificate and watchkeeping (STCW) endorsement and are employed in a position deemed mission useful by the Strategic Sealift Officer Program Manager (SSOPM).
- Via a change of designator by Navy Reserve officers originally commissioned through other programs, or inter-service transfer of officers from other reserve components who possess at a minimum that of an active USCG second mate or second assistant engineer unlimited tonnage and horsepower officer credential with current STCW endorsement, and are employed in a position deemed mission useful by the SSOPM.
- Obtain and maintain an unlimited tonnage and/or horsepower USCG Merchant Mariner credential.
- Complete formal Navy training as required by Commander, Military Sealift Command and the Strategic Sealift Officer Program sponsor, as prescribed by the SSOPM.
  - An example of this training is completing the Naval Science curriculum at the USMMA.

== See also ==
- Badges of the United States Navy
- Obsolete badges of the United States military
