= United States Maritime Service =

American government agency

- Seal

Agency overview
- Formed: April 7, 1939
- Dissolved: 1954 (but still active)
- Headquarters: Washington, D.C.
- Agency executives: l Stephen M. Carmel, Administrator; Rear Admiral Anthony J. "Tony" Ceraolo, USMS, Superintendent
- Parent agency: Department of Transportation
- Website: www.marad.dot.gov

Footnotes
- Since its dissolution in 1954, the service still actively commissions uniformed officers to serve at the U.S Merchant Marine Academy.

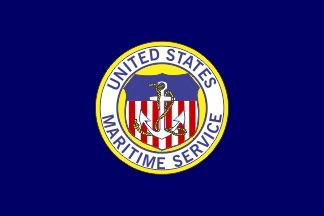
Flag of the United States Maritime Service.

The United States Maritime Service (USMS) was established in 1938 under the provisions of the Merchant Marine Act of 1936 as voluntary training organization to train individuals to become officers and crew members on merchant ships that form the United States Merchant Marine per 46 U.S.C. § 51701. Heavily utilized during World War II, the USMS was largely dissolved in 1954, and its resources were absorbed into other federal departments. However, while the service is no longer structurally organized, remnants of the service still exist today and the service still actively commissions officers to fill the ranks of the U.S. Navy Strategic Sealift Officer corps and to function as administrators and instructors at the United States Merchant Marine Academy and the state maritime academies.

== Current role ==
The U.S. Maritime Service falls under the authority of the Maritime Administration of the U.S. Department of Transportation. The Commandant of the United States Maritime Service is the Maritime Administrator, who also serves as the director of the National Shipping Authority and the chairperson of the Maritime Subsidy Board. The Secretary of Transportation may determine the number of individuals in the service, set the rates of pay, prescribe the service's uniform, and create and issue awards for the service (46 U.S. Code § 51701). By law, the U.S. Maritime Service's rank structure must be the same as that of the U.S. Coast Guard, but uniforms worn are those of the U.S. Navy with distinctive USMS insignia and devices. The U.S. Maritime Service is not part of the structurally organized uniformed services of the United States. The officers in the service cannot claim veteran status or military benefits including retirement (unless earned separately by previous, concurrent, or subsequent military service). Uniformed officers serving in the U.S. Maritime Service cannot be deployed or assigned to another military service, and thus are not subjected to the Uniform Code of Military Justice.

Graduates of the state maritime academies Student Incentive Payment Program and graduates of the U.S. Merchant Marine Academy are required to report annually to the Maritime Administration to comply with their service obligations.

Superintendents or presidents of the seven maritime academies in the U.S. are frequently commissioned in the U.S. Maritime Service, such as the superintendent of the United States Merchant Marine Academy. Additionally, some administrators and instructors at the maritime academies may be assigned rank in the Maritime Service. Those with U.S. Maritime Service rank indicate that by listing their rank and name, followed by "USMS".

== History ==
The merchant marine in the United States was in a state of decline in the mid-1930s. At that time, few ships were being built, existing ships were old and inefficient, maritime unions were at war with one another, ship owners were at odds with the unions, and the crews' efficiency and morale were at an ebb. Congress took action to fix the problems in 1936. The Merchant Marine Act, approved on 29 June 1936, created the U.S. Maritime Commission "to further the development and maintenance of an adequate and well balanced American merchant marine, to promote the commerce of the United States, and to aid in the national defense."

The commission realized that a trained merchant marine work force was vital to the national interest. At the request of Congress, the chairman of the Maritime Commission, VADM Emory S. Land worked with ADM Russell R. Waesche, Commandant of the Coast Guard, to formulate a training program for merchant-marine personnel. Called the U.S. Maritime Service, the new training program was inaugurated in 1938. It used a combination of civilian Maritime Commission and uniformed Coast Guard instructors to advance the professional training of merchant mariners.

As with the other military services, the entry of the United States into World War II necessitated the immediate growth of the merchant marine and the Coast Guard. The Maritime Commission spawned the War Shipping Administration in early February 1942. This new agency received a number of functions considered vital to the war effort, including maritime training. Several weeks after the creation of the new agency, however, the Maritime Service was transferred again to the Coast Guard (on 28 February of that year, under Executive Order 9083; the marine safety aspects of the Bureau of Marine Inspection and Navigation (BuMIN) were also transferred to the Coast Guard at this time). The transfer allowed the War Shipping Administration to concentrate on organizing American merchant shipping, building new ships, and carrying cargoes where they were needed most.

The Maritime Service was later transferred to another agency, while marine inspection and licensing continued to be Coast Guard missions. The need for administering the merchant marine during wartime was demonstrated during World War I. Commerce warfare, carried on by submarines and merchant raiders, had a disastrous effect on the Allied merchant fleet. With the resumption of unrestricted submarine warfare in 1917, U-boats sank ships faster than replacements could be built. The United States intended to meet this crisis with large numbers of mass-produced freighters and transports. When World War II loomed, the Maritime Commission began a crash shipbuilding program utilizing every available resource. The experienced shipyards built complicated vessels, such as warships. New shipyards, which opened almost overnight around the country, generally built less sophisticated ships such as the emergency construction Liberty ships. By 1945 the shipyards had completed more than 2,700 "Liberty" ships and hundreds of Victory ships, tankers and transports.

The official song of the Maritime Service and Merchant Marine is "Heave Ho! My Lads, Heave Ho!". It was written by Lieutenant Jack Lawrence (a co-writer of "All or Nothing at All" and English language lyricist of "Beyond the Sea" who ultimately served as the president of ASCAP) while he was assigned as the bandleader of the Sheepshead Bay Maritime Service Training Station in Brooklyn, New York. During his stint in the Maritime Service, Lawrence met his longtime companion, psychologist Walter David Myden.

=== Former training centers and schools ===
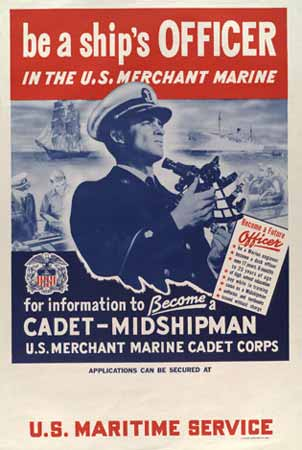
Maritime Service recruiting poster from WWII.

All of these new ships needed trained officers and crews to operate them. The Coast Guard provided much of the advanced training for merchant marine personnel to augment the training of state merchant marine academies. The Maritime Commission requested that the Coast Guard provide training in 1938 when the Maritime Service was created. The Maritime Service established several training centers throughout the United States:

- Port Hueneme, California (1941–1942)
- Avalon, California (1942–1945)
- Sheepshead Bay, Brooklyn, New York (1942–1954)
- Hoffman Island, New York (1938–1945)
- Government Island, California (1938–1943)
- Gallups Island, Massachusetts (1940–1945)
- Huntington, New York

They also established two officers' candidate schools:

- Fort Trumbull, Connecticut (1939–1946)
- Alameda, California (1943–1954)

Training ships crewed by the Coast Guard included the maritime-commissioned American Mariner. Licensed and unlicensed merchant marine personnel enrolled in the service. The ranks, grades, and ratings for the Maritime Service were based on those of the Coast Guard. Training for experienced personnel lasted three months; while inexperienced personnel trained for six months. Pay was based on the person's highest certified position in merchant service, and new students received cadet wages. American citizens at least 19 years old, with one year of service on American merchant vessels of more than 500 gross tons, were eligible for enrollment. Coast Guard training of merchant mariners was vital to winning the war. Thousands of the sailors who crewed the new American merchant fleet trained under the watchful eyes of the Coast Guard.

The Coast Guard only continued the administration of the Maritime Service for ten months after the United States entered the war. Merchant marine training and most aspects of merchant marine activity transferred to the newly created War Shipping Administration on 1 September 1942. The transfer allowed the Coast Guard to take a more active role in the war and concentrated government administration of the merchant marine in one agency. However, just as the transfer removed the merchant marine training role from the Coast Guard, the service assumed the role of licensing seamen and inspecting merchant vessels.

== Uniforms ==
The United States Maritime Service wears uniforms that resemble the uniforms of officers in the United States Navy, but with different insignia. In place of the star worn on naval line officers' shoulder boards, USMS line officers have a gold anchor and wreath, while other symbols indicated specialized occupations, as in the Navy. The symbols and occupations are as follows:

- Anchor – line officer
- Caduceus – medical field
- Three-bladed propeller – engineering department
- Single leaf – ship's supply department
- Four lightning bolts – radio operations
- Crescent moon – steward department, dealing with cooking and cleaning in the galley.
- Cross – Christian chaplain
- Two slabs with the Star of David overhead – Jewish chaplain

Another difference is seen in the cap devices worn on the combination cover. For the Navy, the device depicts an eagle perched on top of a shield of stars and stripes with two crossed anchors behind it. For the Maritime Service, the device shows an eagle perched on a silver shield of different design bearing a gold anchor. The shield was also circled by a wreath of gold leaves.

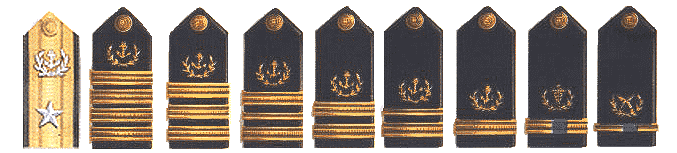
USMS WWII Shoulder Boards. Left to right: Commodore, Captain, Commander, Lieutenant Commander, Lieutenant, Lieutenant (Junior Grade), Ensign, Chief Warrant Officer, Warrant Officer.

The USMS also wears a khaki uniform similar to the U.S. Navy's service khakis. The collar devices which denote rank are identical to the U.S. Navy ranks, however the U.S. Maritime Service wears their rank devices on the right collar and wears their collar device for their occupation on the left collar, similar to staff corps officers in the U.S. Navy. Another unique device that is seen worn with the uniform is a breast insignia worn over the front left pocket. This was formerly known as the Navy Reserve Merchant Marine Insignia, and earned by those officers who were also commissioned officers in the United States Naval Reserve. This insignia depicts an eagle behind a shield of stars and stripes with two crossed anchors behind it. At the bottom of the insignia, there is a scroll that reads "U.S.N.R". In 2011, this insignia was changed to the Strategic Sealift Officer Warfare Insignia. It is similar to the previous insignia with the eagle. This insignia has an eagle that is behind two crossed swords, a shield of stars and stripes and an anchor in the front.

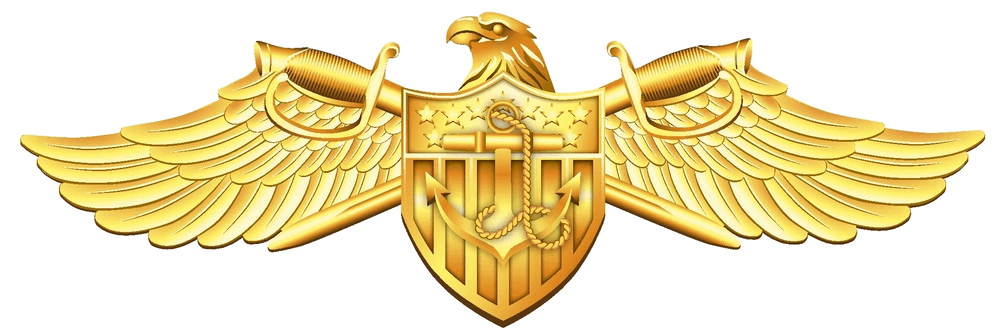
Strategic Sealift Officer Warfare Insignia (SSOWI)

U.S. Merchant Marine Officers who are U.S. Navy Reserve officers while wearing U.S. Navy, U.S. Merchant Marine or U.S. Maritime Service uniforms are authorized to wear the Strategic Sealift Officer Warfare Insignia (SSOWI).

== Ranks ==
From 1936 until 1941 the Maritime Service was run under the U.S. Maritime Commission and it inherited its rank insignia from the U.S. Shipping Board.

U.S. Maritime Service Enlisted Sailor Rates 1938-1941
Chief Petty Officer	Petty Officer 1st Class	Petty Officer 2nd Class	Petty Officer 3rd Class	Ordinary Sailor

U.S. Maritime Service Enlisted Sailor Rates 1942-1954
Chief Petty Officer	Petty Officer 1st Class	Petty Officer 2nd Class	Petty Officer 3rd Class	Ordinary Sailor

Officer's shoulder boards would carry the U.S. Maritime Commission shield in gold, but this would be dropped for the modern wreath and anchor in 1943.

United States Maritime Service Officer Ranks 1938-1943
Captain	Commander	Lieutenant Commander	Lieutenant	Lieutenant (Junior Grade)	Ensign

The ranks of the USMS now match the ranks of the United States Coast Guard but with unique USMS devices.

=== Commissioned officer ranks ===
The rank insignia of commissioned officers.

United States Maritime Service Officer Ranks
Uniformed services pay grade	O-9	O-8	O-7	O-6	O-5	O-4	O-3	O-2	O-1
	Vice Admiral	Rear Admiral	Rear Admiral (Lower Half)	Captain	Commander	Lieutenant Commander	Lieutenant	Lieutenant (Junior Grade)	Ensign

United States Maritime Service Flag Officer Flags
Flag of the Superintendent of the Merchant Marine Academy (Vice Admiral)	Flag of the Superintendent of the Merchant Marine Academy (Rear Admiral)

*Superintendents at both Texas A&M Maritime Academy and SUNY Maritime College also use the flags.

=== Warrant officer ranks ===
Uniformed services pay grade	W-5	W-4	W-3	W-2	W-1
United States Maritime Service
United States Maritime Service		Chief warrant officer 4	Chief warrant officer 3	Chief warrant officer 2

=== Other ranks ===
The rank insignia of non-commissioned officers and enlisted personnel.

Uniformed services pay grade	Special	E-9	E-8	E-7	E-6	E-5	E-4	E-3	E-2	E-1
United States Maritime Service
United States Maritime Service		Master chief petty officer	Senior chief petty officer	Chief petty officer	Petty officer first class	Petty officer second class	Petty officer third class

== See also ==
- United States Merchant Marine
- United States Merchant Marine Academy

=== State Maritime Academies ===
- Maine Maritime Academy
- California Maritime Academy
- Texas Maritime Academy
- SUNY Maritime Academy
- Massachusetts Maritime Academy
- Great Lakes Maritime Academy
