= USS Harry Lee =

American Navy attack transport vessel

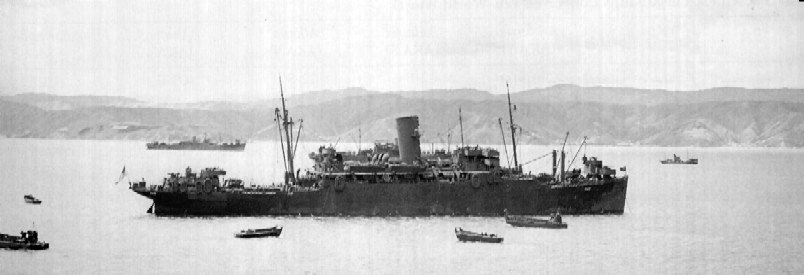

History

United States
- Name: USS Harry Lee (APA-10)
- Namesake: General Harry Lee, USMC
- Builder: New York Shipbuilding
- Launched: 18 October 1930
- Christened: Exochorda
- Acquired: 30 October 1940
- Commissioned: 27 December 1940
- Decommissioned: 9 May 1946
- Renamed: USS Harry Lee, Tarsus
- Reclassified: AP-17 to APA-10, 1 February 1943
- Honors and awards: Seven battle stars for World War II service
- Fate: Sold to Turkey April 1948, destroyed by fire 14 December 1960

General characteristics
- Class & type: Harry Lee-class attack transport
- Displacement: 9,989 tons (l)
- Length: 475 ft 4 in (144.88 m)
- Beam: 61 ft 6 in (18.75 m)
- Draft: 25 ft 4 in (7.72 m)
- Speed: 16 knots
- Complement: 453
- Armament: 2 x 6" guns, 4 x 40 mm guns.

USS Harry Lee (APA-10) was a Harry Lee-class attack transport that saw service with the US Navy during World War II. She served in the Pacific War, as well as in North Atlantic Ocean operations, and safely returned home post-war with seven battle stars to her credit. She was the only ship in her class.

Harry Lee was built as the passenger ship SS Exochorda by New York Shipbuilding Co., Camden, New Jersey, in 1931. One of American Export LinesAmerican Export Lines "4 Aces" sister ships — SS Excalibur, SS Exeter, SS Excambion and SS Exochorda — she operated in the Mediterranean area for American Export Lines.

Acquired by the Navy 30 October 1940, she was converted at Tietjen and Lang Dry Dock Co., Hoboken, New Jersey, and commissioned Harry Lee (AP-17) 27 December 1940. Harry Lee was redesignated APA-10, 1 February 1943.

== Pre-World War II North Atlantic operations ==
Harry Lee spent the first few months of her commissioned service transporting U.S. Marine combat units to the Caribbean for training exercises, helping to build the amphibious teams which were to find such great success in the later stages of World War II. After a stay at Norfolk, Virginia, the transport was assigned in July to the Iceland route, carrying troops and supplies to that country from Norfolk and New York.

== World War II operations ==
After making two such passages, she returned to Boston, Massachusetts, 22 December 1941 to take part in additional training exercises. With America then in the war, Harry Lee spent the next 18 months in amphibious maneuvers in the Caribbean area. During this time the ship carried out many valuable experiments with landing craft and boat control procedures, all of which bore fruit in the dangerous months to come.

=== Supporting the North Africa invasion ===
Returning to Boston 6 April 1943, Harry Lee was designated for use in the upcoming offensive in the Mediterranean, and sailed 8 June for Algeria. She anchored at Oran 22 June to prepare for the landing and found herself off the southwest coast of Sicily 10 July with Vice Admiral Hewitt's Western Naval Task Force. During this giant invasion Harry Lee debarked her troops through the heavy surf at Scoglitti and withstood several Axis air attacks before retiring 2 days later.

=== Transferred to the Pacific Fleet ===
After the success of the Sicilian operation, the transport returned German prisoners of war to the United States, arriving Norfolk 3 August. It was then decided that her amphibious prowess was needed in the Pacific, and she sailed 24 August for Wellington, New Zealand, via the Panama Canal and San Francisco, California, arriving 12 October 1943. At Wellington Harry Lee loaded Marines in preparation for the big push of the invasion of the Gilbert Islands.

=== The invasion of Tarawa ===
She proceeded to Efate, New Hebrides, 1 – 7 November, and for the next few weeks held amphibious practice landings in preparation for the landings on Tarawa. The transport departed for Tarawa 13 November, and arrived offshore 20 November. There she launched her Marines onto the bloody beaches, under threat of submarine attack and air attack and sailed the next day for Pearl Harbor.

=== Invasion of the Marshall Islands ===
Harry Lee participated in rehearsal landings in Hawaiian waters after her arrival at Pearl Harbor 7 December 1943, and sailed 23 January 1944 for the invasion of the Marshall Islands, next step on the island road to Japan. She arrived off Kwajalein 31 January. She effectively carried out her role in this complicated operation by landing troops on two small islands in the atoll; they met little opposition. Harry Lee remained off Kwajalein until departing for Funafuti 5 February. From there she sailed to Noumea 24 February and by 14 March was anchored off Guadalcanal to load troops and continue her amphibious preparations.

=== New Guinea operations ===
After carrying troops to Bougainville and New Guinea in April, Harry Lee sailed to Aitape, New Guinea, under Rear Admiral Barbey for the Hollandia operation. She arrived 23 April after the initial assault, unloaded her troops, and proceeded to bring reinforcements from other points in New Guinea to the landing area. This accomplished, the transport arrived Espiritu Santo 11 May.

=== Landing troops on Guam ===
Harry Lee was next to take part in the invasion of the Marianas. After landing operations conducted around Guadalcanal the ship sailed to Kwajalein and got underway in convoy for Guam 12 June. During this gigantic operation, in which troops were projected over 1,000 miles of ocean from the nearest advance base, Harry Lee was held in reserve for the Guam landings. She arrived off Agat, Guam, 21 July 1944 and debarked her troops. The transport then remained offshore loading and relanding troops for tactical purposes until 25 July, when she steamed with her fellow transports to Eniwetok. They arrived 29 July, and 2 days later sailed for Pearl Harbor.

=== Overhaul, and then to the Philippines ===
Arriving Pearl Harbor 7 August 1944, Harry Lee set course for California and a much-needed overhaul. She arrived San Pedro, Los Angeles, 18 August and remained in California until departing 21 October with troops for Seeadler Harbor, Manus. Until 31 December the ship conducted practice landings in New Guinea and the Solomons for the upcoming invasion of Luzon, and departed the last day of 1944 for Lingayen Gulf.

En route, Japanese planes attacked the task force savagely with suicide planes and bombers, but Harry Lee by effective gunfire and luck escaped damage. She entered Lingayen Gulf 9 January 1945 and began landing troops under constant air alert. That night the transports retired off the beaches under smoke screens, returning next day to resume the dangerous job of landing supplies. Harry Lee sailed 10 January for Leyte Gulf, anchoring 14 January.

=== Iwo Jima, her last amphibious operation ===
With troops ashore at Lingayen, Harry Lee departed 19 January for Ulithi and arrived 2 days later. She soon was back in action, however, sailing 17 February for Iwo Jima and her last amphibious operation of the war. The transport arrived via Guam 22 February, 3 days after the initial landings, and after sending a reconnaissance unit ashore 24 February disembarked her troops. The ship remained off Iwo Jima until 6 March acting as a hospital evacuation vessel. She then sailed with casualties to Saipan 6 – 9 March.

Harry Lee spent the rest of her time in the Pacific transporting troops and supplies, as the American thrust at Japan neared its final phase. She touched at Tulagi, Noumea, New Guinea, Manus, and the Philippines, bringing reinforcements and vitally needed supplies. The ship was at Leyte Gulf 20 July when ordered back to the United States, and she arrived for a brief stay 8 August. It was during this time that news of Japan's surrender reached the veteran transport.

=== End-of-war activity ===
The ship reached Manila 16 September at aid in the occupation of Japan, and after loading troops at various points in the Philippines arrived Tokyo Bay 13 October 1945. Assigned to Operation Magic Carpet, and the huge job of bringing American veterans home from the Pacific, Harry Lee arrived San Francisco 4 November, and made another round trip to the Philippines and back, arriving 20 January 1946. From San Francisco she sailed 23 January for New York, via Norfolk.

== Post-war decommissioning ==
The ship arrived 9 February 1946 and decommissioned at Brooklyn Navy Yard 9 May 1946. After a period in Reserve Fleet, she was sold to Turkey in April 1948. The ship was renamed Tarsus and became very popular under the control of her first Captain, Sait Özege. The Tarsus later fell victim to a rare three-ship collision in the Bosporus after being struck by the burning Yugoslav-flagged tanker ship Peter Zoranic on 14 December 1960. As a result, the vessel was sold to Italy for scrap on 6 November 1961.

== Military awards and honors ==
Harry Lee received seven battle stars for World War II service.

== See also ==
- Dwight Agnew, ship's commander during the Battle of Iwo Jima

== Notes ==
a: Two ships of the same name, SS Exochorda, existed – one pre-war and another post-war. The pre-war SS Exochorda, which later became USS Harry Lee, was a member of a quartet of ships referred to as the (original) "4 Aces" of American Export Lines. During the war, three ships in the original quartet were lost. The fourth ship, Harry Lee, was later sold and renamed Tarsus. Planning to continue the "Aces" line in the post-war period, American Export Lines replaced the original quartet of ships with a fleet known as the "New 4 Aces." The new "Aces" carried the same names as the ships in the original quartet. One of the new "Aces" ships, SS Exochorda had been refurbished from USS Dauphin (APA-97) and later became the floating dormitory SS Stevens.
