= Four Aces (passenger liners) =

Quartet of passenger-cargo ships

The 4 Aces were the quartet of passenger-cargo liners Excalibur, Exochorda, Exeter, and Excambion, originally built for American Export Lines by New York Shipbuilding of Camden, New Jersey between 1929 and 1931. AEL placed the "4 Aces" in line service between the US and the Mediterranean, also offering cruises of up to 40 days.

During World War II, all four vessels were taken over by the U.S. Navy, renamed, and designated as AP- and APA-class troop transports. Excambion became USS John Penn (APA-23), Excalibur became USS Joseph Hewes (AP-50), Exeter became USS Edward Rutledge (AP-52), and Exochorda became USS Harry Lee.

Excambion, Excalibur, and Exeter were lost to enemy action; after the war Exochorda was sold to Turkish Maritime Lines and renamed Tarsus.

During World War II the company's subsidiary American Export Airlines borrowed three of the names (excepting Exochorda) for its Sikorsky VS-44 flying boats, which it used in transatlantic service. Excambion is preserved on display at the New England Air Museum in Windsor Locks, Connecticut.

== The New “4 Aces” ==
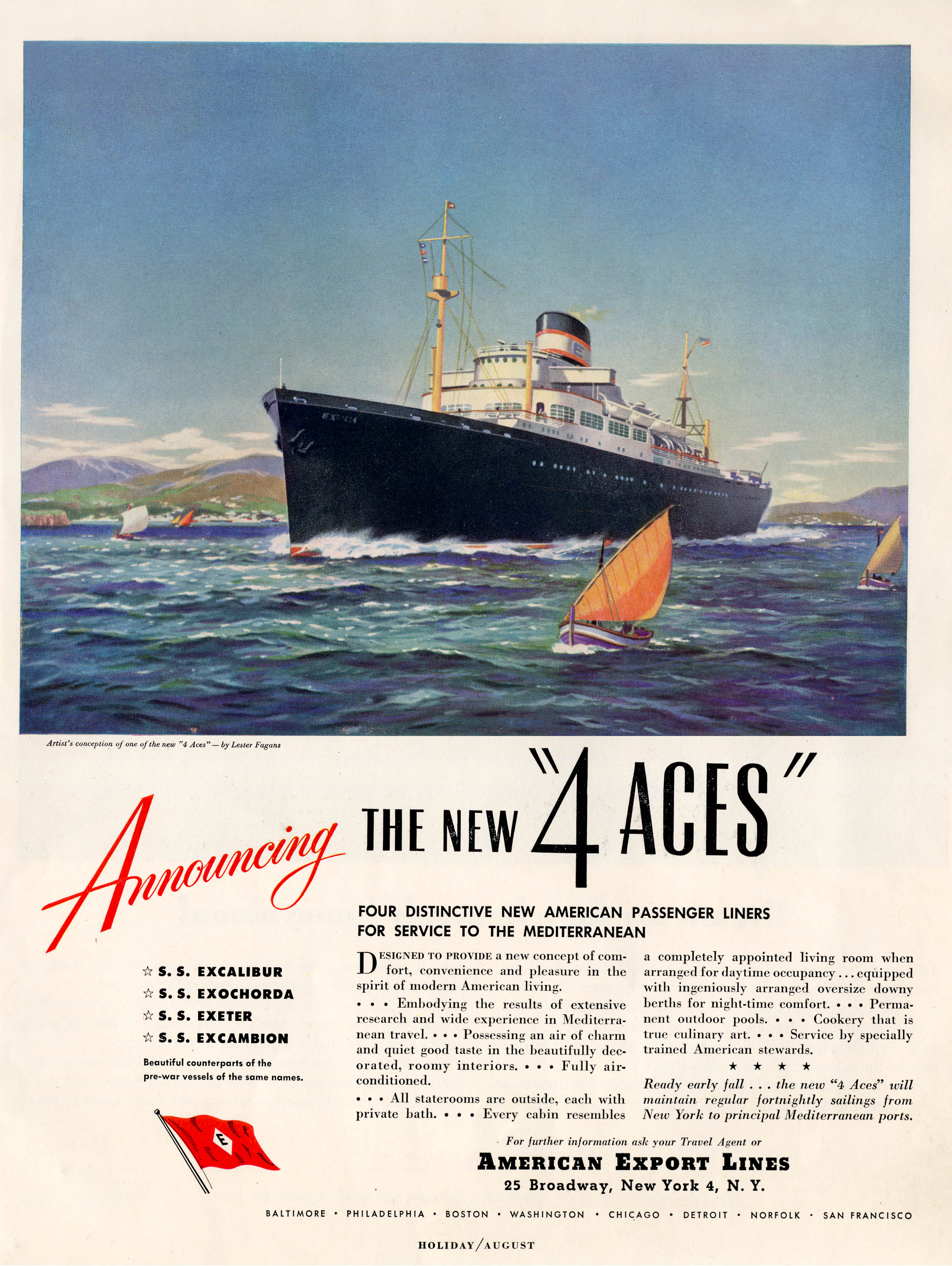
American Export Lines magazine print ad (ca. 1948) announcing the new (post-war) 4 Aces

After World War II, American Export Lines purchased four C3-class Windsor-class attack transports built by Bethlehem Shipbuilding Corp. at Sparrow's Point, Maryland, had them refitted as passenger-cargo liners, and placed them in service as the new "4 Aces." USS Dauphin became Exochorda, USS Dutchess became Excalibur, USS Queens became Excambion and USS Shelby (APA-105) became Exeter. The quartet sailed under the AEL flag until the 1960s.

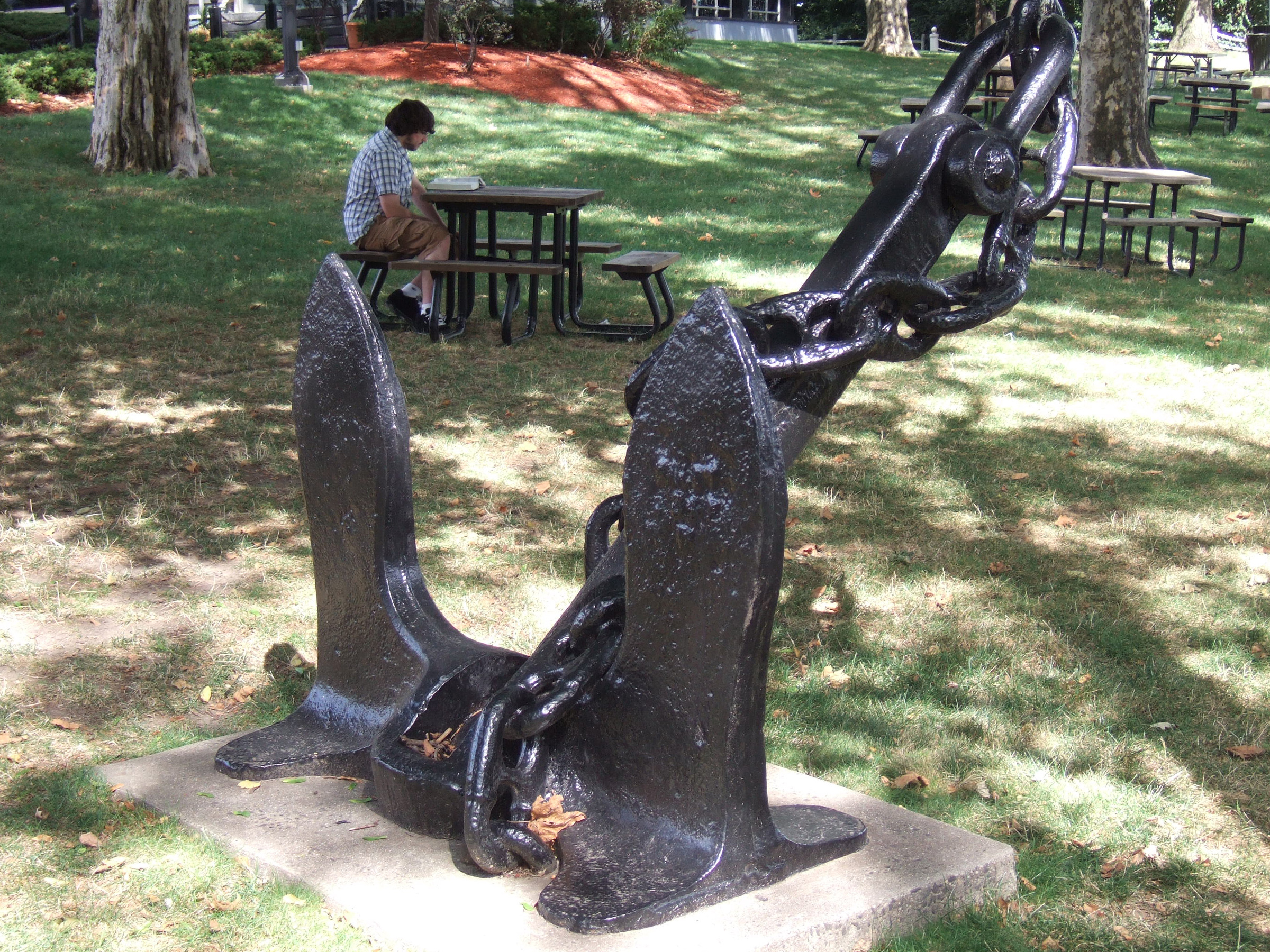
One of the SS Stevens' anchors on permanent display at the Stevens Institute

In 1968, the post-war SS Exochorda was purchased by Stevens Institute of Technology in Hoboken, New Jersey to alleviate a shortage of on-campus student housing. It was refurbished at Bethlehem Steel Shipyard in Hoboken, renamed SS Stevens and anchored on the Hudson River adjacent to the campus, where it served a dormitory. It remained in service until 1975, when skyrocketing utility costs made its continued operation prohibitive. Before it was towed away and sold for scrap, one of Stevens' anchors was removed and permanently displayed on campus as a memento.

In 1965, the post-war Excambion became USTS Texas Clipper for service with the Texas Maritime Academy until being sunk as an artificial reef on November 17, 2007.

== Notes ==
a: Brochures and print ads published by American Export Lines identified their quartet of ships as "4 Aces", as opposed to "Four Aces".
b: In 1964, American Export Lines merged with Isbrandtsen Co., becoming American Export-Isbrandtsen Lines.
