= S. S. Stevens =

S. S. Stevens may refer to:

- Stanley Smith Stevens, American psychologist
- SS Stevens, a ship used as a floating dormitory
