= Dormitory ship =

Boat with living quarters

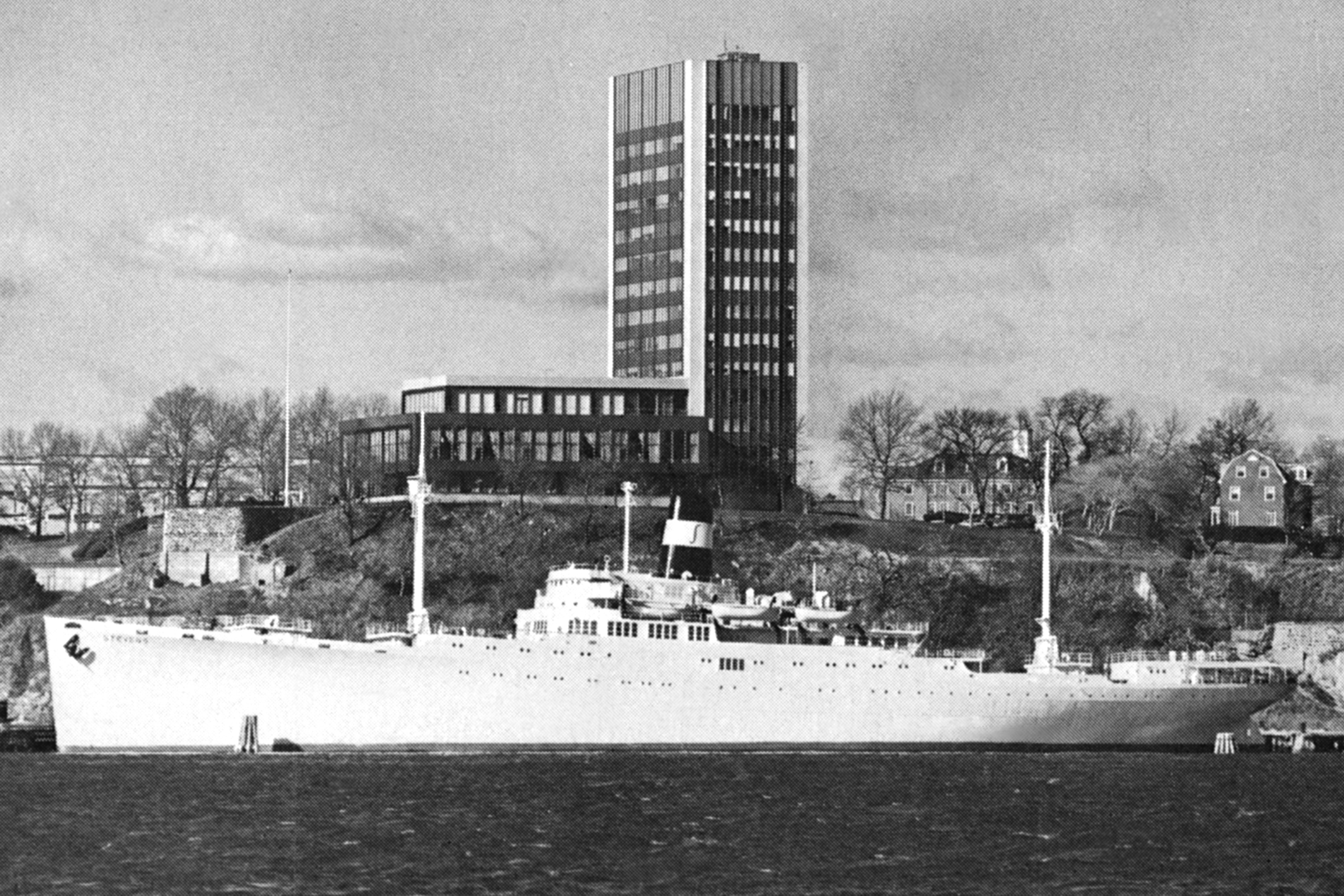
SS Stevens, formerly a U.S. Navy Windsor-class attack transport, serving as a dormitory ship at Stevens Institute of Technology, Eighth Street Pier, Hoboken, New Jersey, c. 1970

A dormitory ship is a vessel whose primary function is to serve as floating living quarters. Such craft serve as conventional land-based dormitories in all respects except that the living quarters are aboard a floating vessel, most often moored in place near its host facility. It may be seaworthy or not.

Dormitory ships, regardless of their original design or function, may serve as temporary or permanent housing for refugees, accommodation for academic institutions, and off-shore oil drilling operations.

When a vessel is used by the military for dedicated housing, as at shipyards, naval bases, and afloat abroad, it is known as a barracks ship.

An analogue to both is the prison ship, which provides a floating space for incarceration, possibly referred to as a brig in the military.

A vessel that contains living quarters as ancillary support to its primary function — such as providing hands-on maritime training at sea — is more appropriately categorized as a training ship.

In 2016 what had once been the world's largest cruiseferry, Ocean Gala, was chosen by the Swedish migration bureau to become temporary housing for some 1,800 of that nation's estimated 160,000 refugees which had arrived in Sweden in just the prior year seeking asylum there. This proposal did not come to fruition.

== Image gallery ==
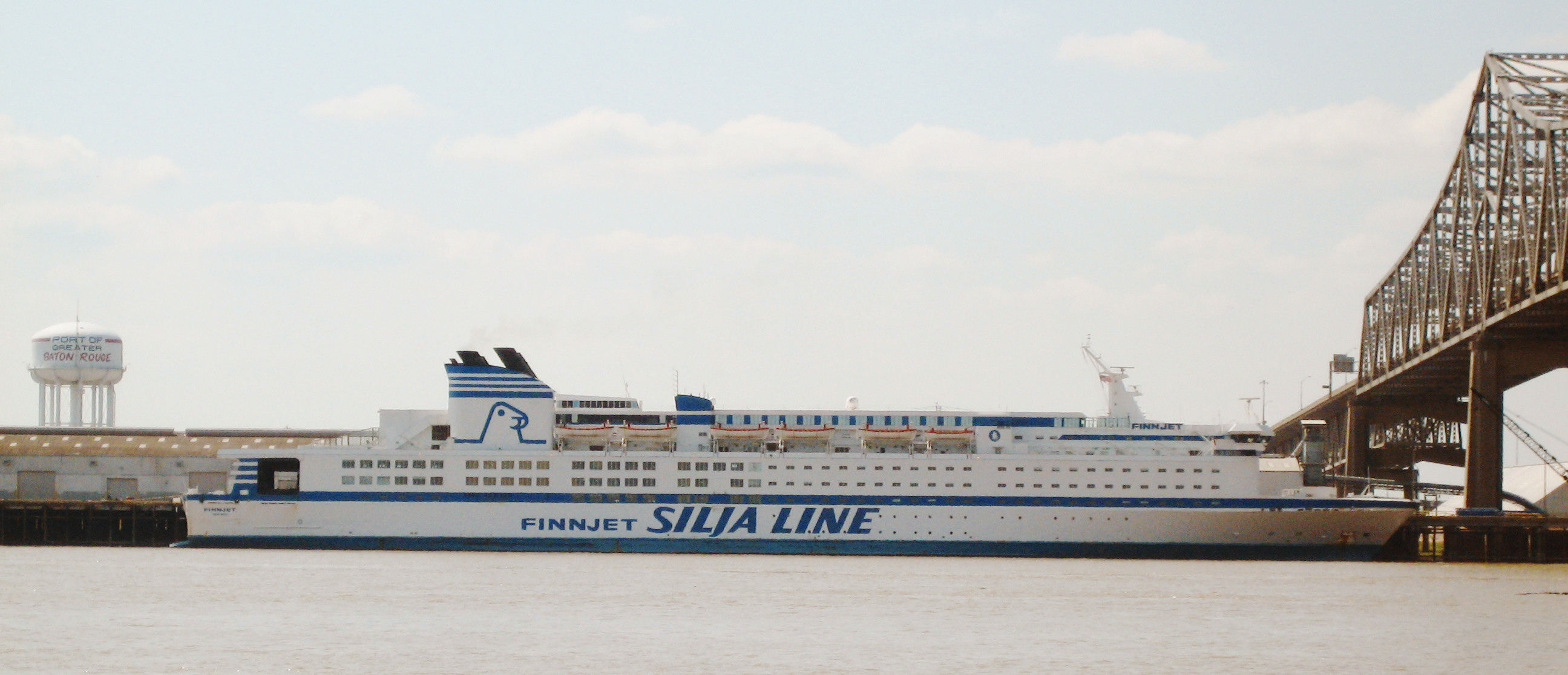
GTS Finnjet served as housing for the students, faculty, and staff of the Louisiana State University Health Sciences Center, during relief efforts following Hurricane Katrina in August 2005.

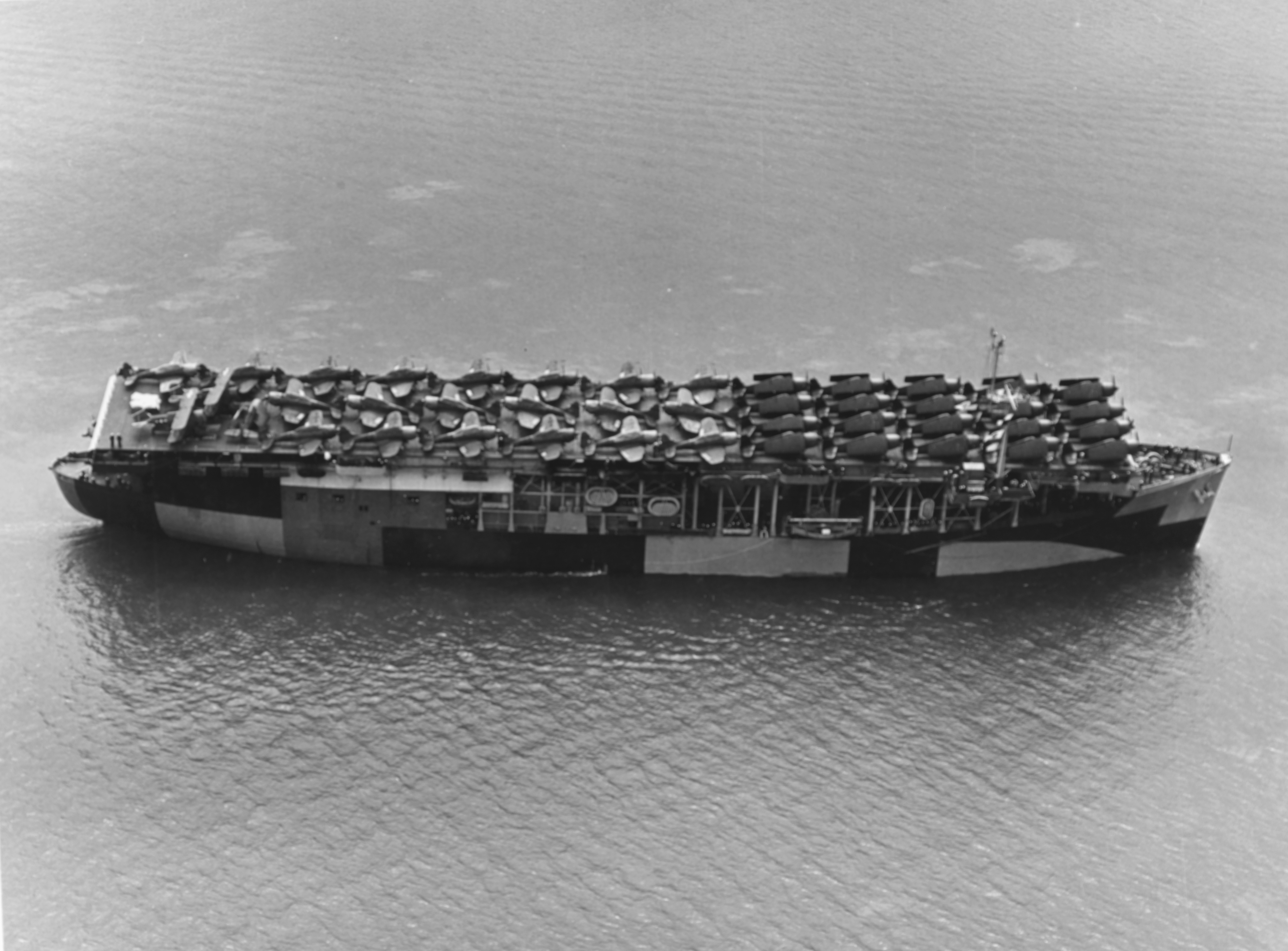
USS Long Island (CVE-1) was the U.S. Navy's first escort carrier, and served as both an immigration center in the 1940s and student hostel in the 1970s.

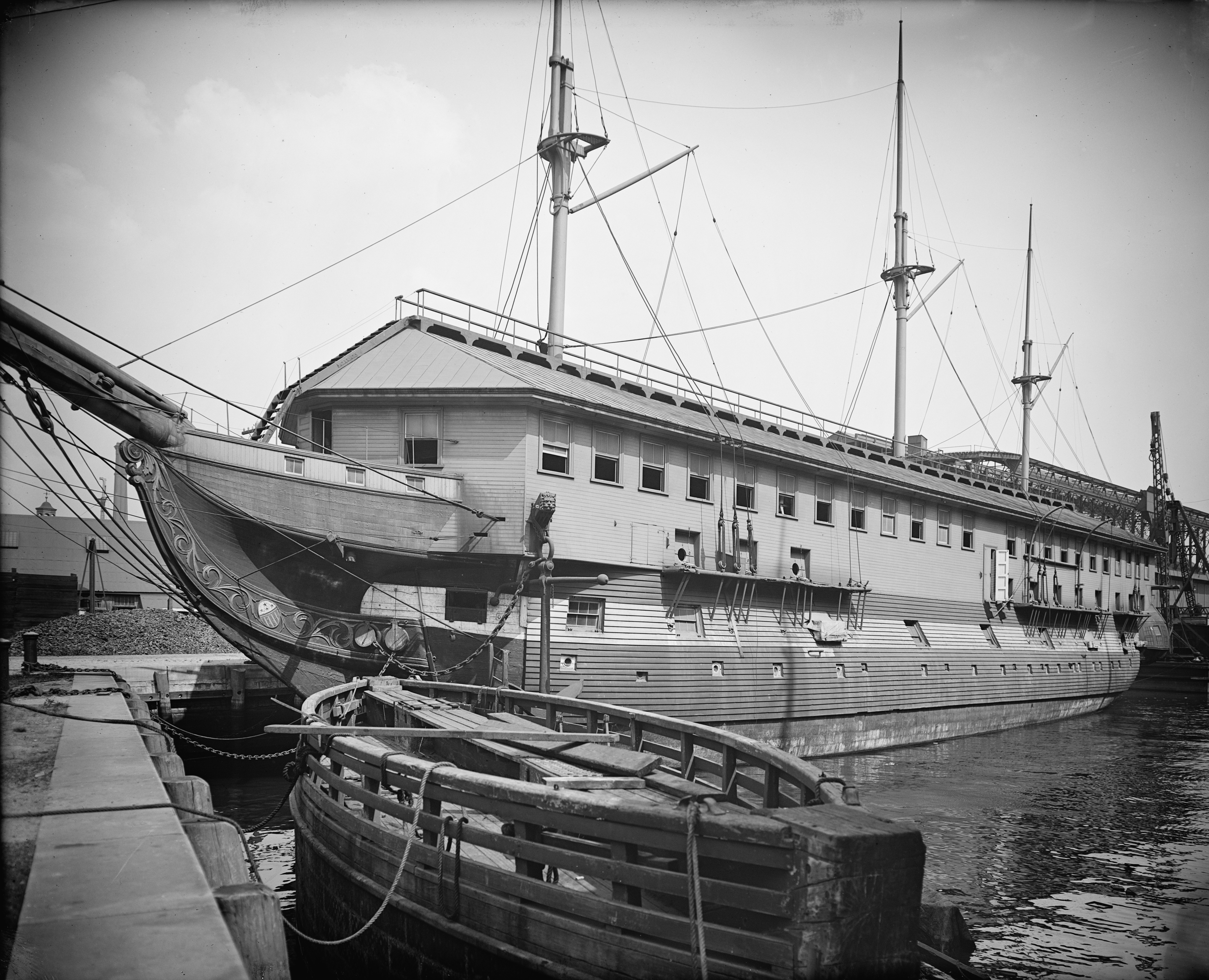
USS Constitution, today revered as "Old Ironsides", languished dismasted and boarded over as a barracks ship at the Charleston navy yard in Boston c. 1905.

== See also ==
- Barracks ship
- Hospital ship
- Hotelship
- Hulk
- Prison ship
