= SS Stevens =

Floating dormitory for Stevens Institute of Technology

Coordinates: 40°44′40″N 74°1′22″W

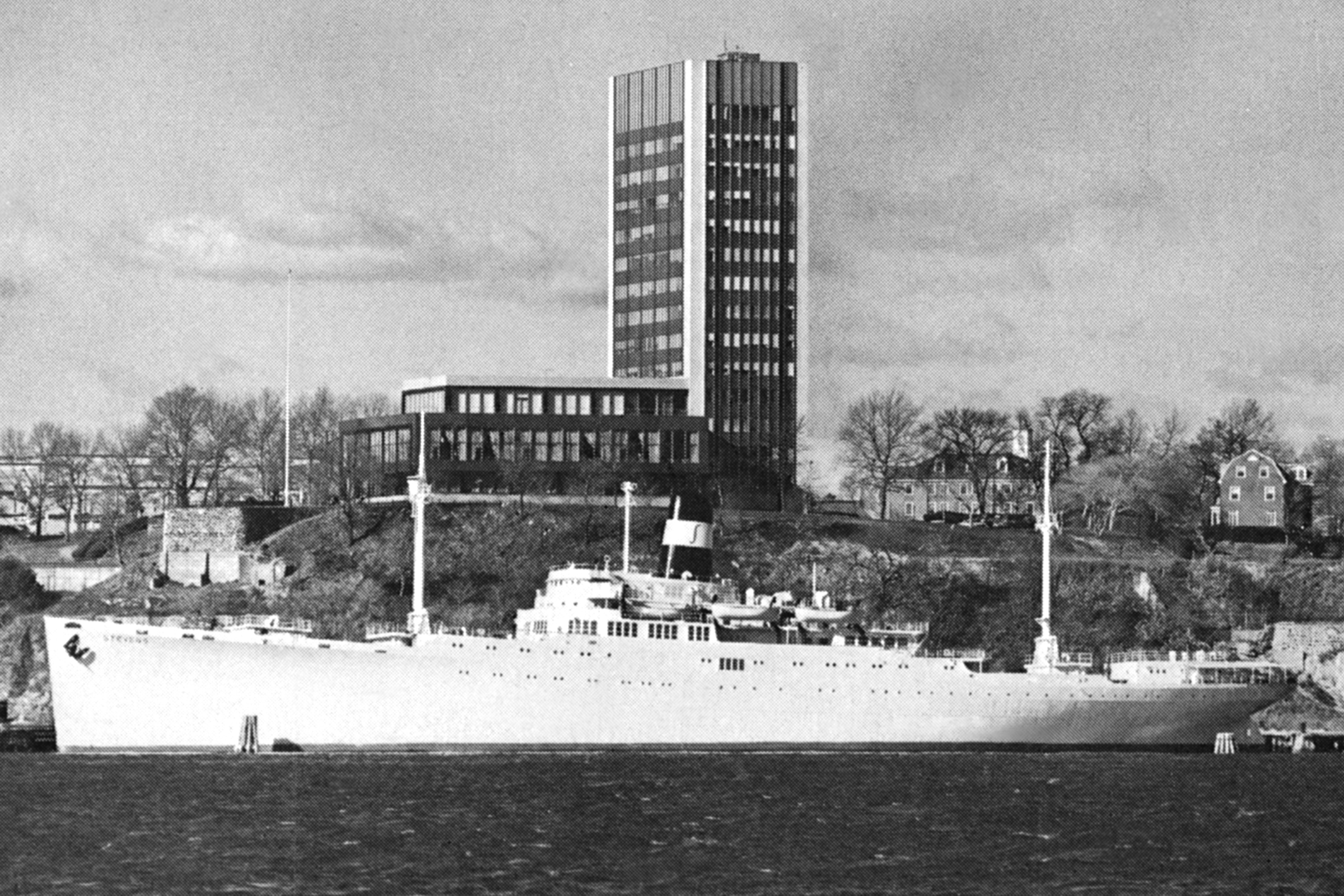
- SS Stevens at Stevens Institute of Technology, Eighth Street Pier, Hoboken, NJ c. 1970

History
- Builder: Bethlehem Steel, Sparrow Point Shipyard, Sparrow Point, MD
- Laid down: 22 December 1943 (as cargo ship)
- Launched: 10 June 1944 (as USS Dauphin (APA-97))
- Sponsored by: Mary B. Cooke (as USS Dauphin (APA-97))
- Christened: USS Dauphin (APA-97)
- Renamed: SS Exochorda (1948), SS Stevens (1967)
- Honors and awards: One Battle star, Navy Occupation Service Medal (as USS Dauphin)
- Name: SS Stevens
- Namesake: Stevens Institute of Technology
- Owner: Stevens Institute of Technology
- Cost: $130,301 (as SS Stevens)
- Acquired: October 1967 (as SS Stevens)
- In service: January 1968 (as SS Stevens)
- Out of service: May 1975 (as SS Stevens)
- Nickname(s): "the Ship" (as SS Stevens)
- Fate: Sold for scrap 1975. Scrapped in Chester, PA, Kearny, NJ, Raritan Bay port, 1979
- Badge: ∫ (Integral symbol)

General characteristics
- Type: Hull type C3-S-A3
- Displacement: 14,893 tons
- Length: 473 ft, 1 in
- Beam: 66 ft, 2 in
- Draft: 25 ft
- Propulsion: Disabled (geared turbine engines, single screw, 8,000 hp)
- Boats & landing craft carried: 6 lifeboats including 1 motorized
- Capacity: 150 student residents
- Notes: Maritime Commission hull no. 4419 while under construction, later MC hull no. 1675

SS Stevens, a 473-foot (144 m), 14,893-ton ship, served as a floating dormitory from 1968 to 1975 for about 150 students of Stevens Institute of Technology, a technological university, in Hoboken, New Jersey. Permanently moored on the scenic Hudson River at the foot of the campus across from New York City, this first collegiate floating dormitory became one of the best-known college landmarks in the country.

Twenty-four years prior to her duty as a floating dormitory, the ship served with distinction in World War II as USS Dauphin (APA-97), a Windsor-class attack transport vessel. Originally launched in 1944, Dauphin was awarded one battle star and was present in Tokyo Bay for the Surrender Ceremony of World War II on September 2, 1945.

Following the war, the vessel underwent significant modifications and emerged as the cruise liner SS Exochorda — a member of the "4 Aces", a post-war quartet of ships operated by American Export Lines. During her eleven years of cruise liner service, from 1948 to 1959, Exochorda — along with her nearly identical sister ships in the "4 Aces" — regularly sailed with passengers and cargo on a 12,000-mile (19,000 km) route from New York Harbor to various Mediterranean ports. Exochorda was retired to the US Navy reserve ("mothball") fleet in 1959 where she remained for eight years.

Exochorda's conversion to a dormitory ship, following her purchase by Stevens Institute of Technology in 1967, required only minor modifications such as the connection of land-based water, sewer and electric utilities. Accommodations for the many student residents aboard Stevens included private baths and in-room control of heating and air-conditioning. Featuring portholes, roll-up berths and nautically themed artwork, Stevens became quite popular among her residents.

Purchased by the institute to fill a shortfall in student housing, the ship's operating costs during the initial years of service were comparable to conventional land-based dormitory housing. In later years, however, the ship's burgeoning operating and repair costs, combined with a more favorable housing outlook, forced the institute to sell Stevens in 1975. In tribute, one of her 6-ton anchors was prominently placed on the campus grounds by the graduating Class of 1975. In August 1975, the ship was towed to a shipyard in Chester, Pennsylvania, and she was subsequently scrapped in 1979.

== Location and design ==
=== Setting ===
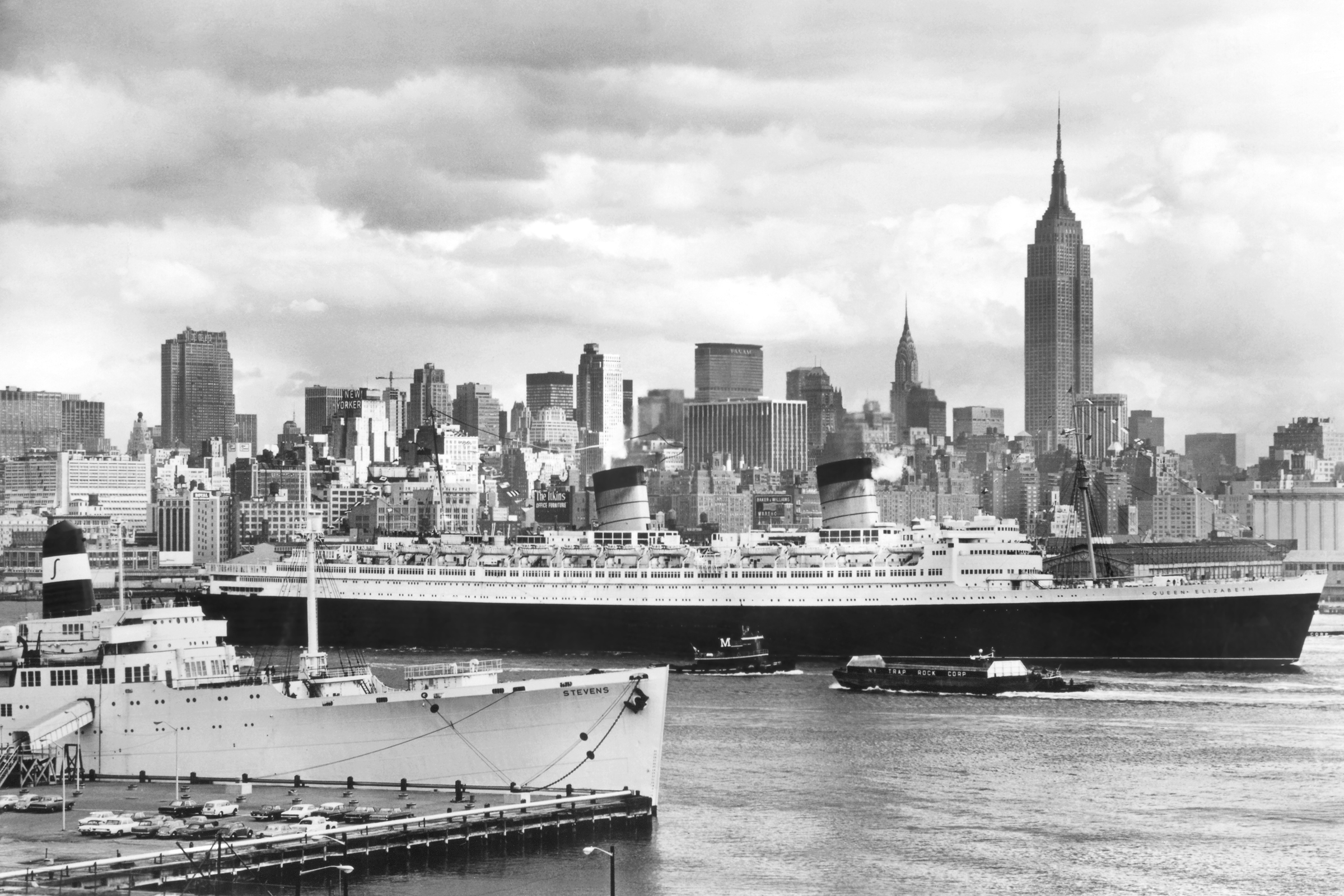
SS Stevens (lower left) docked on the Hudson River, across from New York City, being passed by RMS Queen Elizabeth in 1968. See Gallery for more photos.

From the west bank of the Hudson River, opposite mid-town Manhattan, Stevens offered her residents a panoramic view of the New York skyline extending from the George Washington Bridge in the north, to the Verrazzano–Narrows Bridge in the south. Located at the foot of the Stevens Institute of Technology campus in Hoboken, her venue afforded viewing of the large variety of watercraft that frequented the river. Silently gliding past portholes, river vessels imparted the sensation of motion to residents aboard their stationary home.

Notable among the ships witnessed by Stevens' residents was the great transatlantic ocean liner, RMS Queen Elizabeth, sailing from New York on her final voyage on October 30, 1968. For Stevens' residents, all vessels traveling the river were bestowed New York City's picturesque backdrop.

=== Moored in place ===
Stevens was moored at the foot of a bluff, above which much of the campus is situated. With her starboard side adjacent to the Eighth Street pier at River Road, she was secured at her bow and stern by a total of seven mooring lines. With concurrence by the Coast Guard, four sets of pilings were driven into the river bed, wedging the ship in place and preventing her from drifting downriver in the event the lines were cut. Although she carried four anchors, two on chains at her bow, and two more fastened in place on deck, none were used to anchor the ship.

The robustness of her mooring system was often demonstrated during major storms that swept through the New York area. Despite high winds and accompanying storm surge, the pilings and mooring lines held the ship in place, usually without incident, except for minor damage in some rooms caused by the toppling of unsecured personal items.

In a separate incident unrelated to storm activity, a departing cruise ship — while maneuvering to avoid a collision with two other departing cruise ships — passed unusually close to Stevens. The resulting wake from the passing ship tossed Stevens and caused the mooring bollard securing the bow lines to break away from its footing on the pier. The pilings and remaining lines held the ship in place without further incident.

=== Access to pier and campus ===
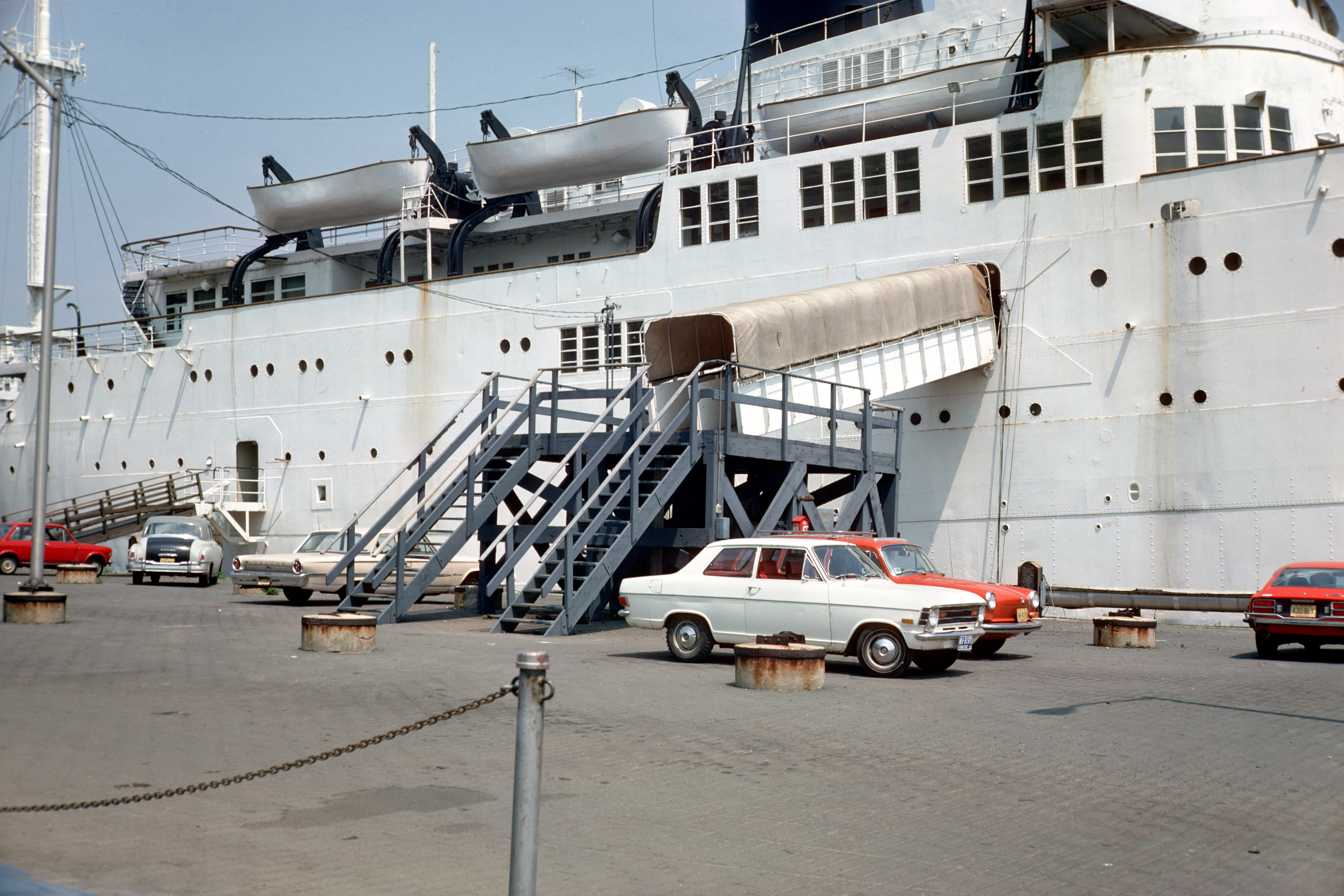
Permanently moored in place, Stevens was accessible via the main gangplank (center), or lower gangplank (far left).

Access to Stevens from the campus-owned Eighth Street Pier was facilitated by two gangplanks. A double-ramped covered gangplank provided access from the main "A" deck foyer to a fixed, elevated platform on the pier. Two stairways connected the elevated platform to the pier surface. A second gangplank, an uncovered single ramp, provided access to the lower "B" deck directly from the pier surface. Rollers attached to the end of each gangplank accommodated the ship's motion on the water.

Normal walking distance between "the Ship", as she was known by students, and upper campus facilities such as the Student Center was approximately 0.5 miles (0.80 km) and included a lengthy flight of stairs south of the Gatehouse. An alternative route was improvised by students seeking to substantially reduce walking time and distance. This route, dubbed "Ho Chi Minh trail", or simply, "the trail", required scaling the treacherous 105-foot (32 m) bluff directly below the Student Center building on the upper campus and was frequented by the ship's more intrepid residents.

=== Cabin plan, decks and cargo ===
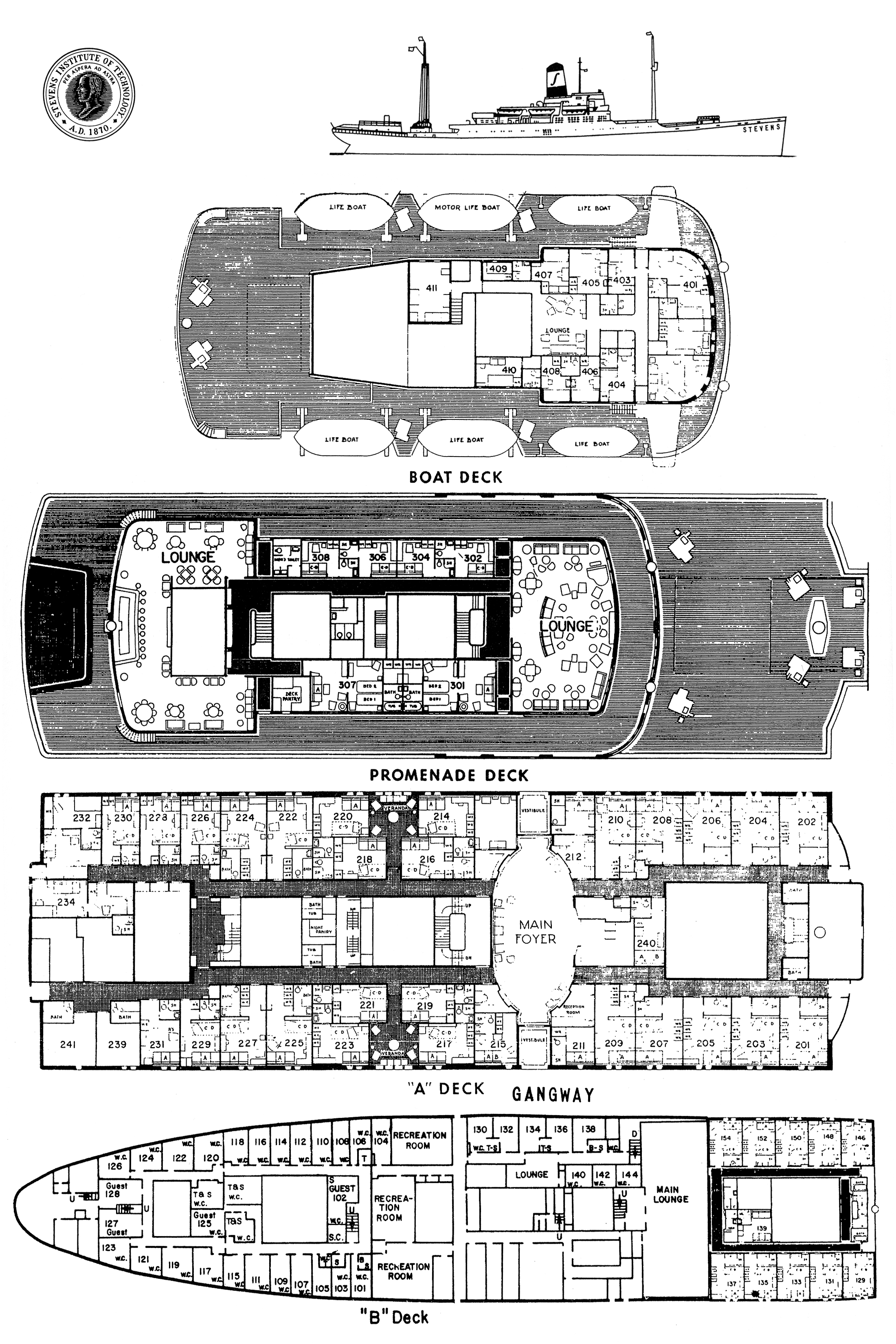
Deck Plan — click for larger image

Stevens comprised a lower "B" deck, main "A" deck, Promenade, Boat and Sun decks. Students' quarters and public spaces were distributed throughout all decks except for Sun deck which was closed.

The main "A" deck, the highest deck to extend the entire length of the ship, included a center section with students' rooms and the ship's main foyer with a gangway.

The lower "B" deck contained the largest number of students' rooms, recreational areas and the ship's laundry room, equipped with automatic washers and dryers.

Promenade deck, immediately above the main deck, contained students' rooms and the ship's more frequently used lounges. The aft lounge, the largest on the ship featured expansive casement windows, oak furniture and rift-cut American oak paneling. French doors provided access to the promenade for open-air strolling and sightseeing. Promenade's forward lounge, paneled in Kelobra wood, was often used for smaller social gatherings.

Boat deck carried the ship's six lifeboats, three on each side, including one motorized boat, the center boat on the port side. The ship was fitted with gravity roller track davits for the larger aft and center boats. The curved davit arms extended over the open portion of Promenade deck. Radial single pivot davits were implemented for the smaller forward boats.

Sun deck contained the ship's wheelhouse flanked by docking bridges. Outside viewing by wheel house personnel was facilitated by three large forward-looking portholes, flanked by smaller portholes.

Areas below "B" deck, not authorized for passenger access and closed for students, comprised "C" deck, engine room, shaft alley, fuel tanks and water ballast areas.

The cabin plan shows the following number of students' rooms on the ship:

| Boat deck | Promenade | "A" deck | "B" deck | Total |
|---|---|---|---|---|
| 10 rooms | 6 rooms | 35 rooms | 46 rooms | 97 rooms |

The ship contained six cargo holds numbered 1 through 6, starting at the bow. Hatch locations for cargo holds were:

| Cargo hatch | Location |
|---|---|
| #1 and #2 | Forward portion of "A" deck, on the bow |
| #3 | Forward portion of Promenade deck |
| #4 | Aft portion of Boat deck |
| #5 and #6 | Aft portion of "A" deck |

== Heritage of Stevens ==
=== Adventuresome past ===
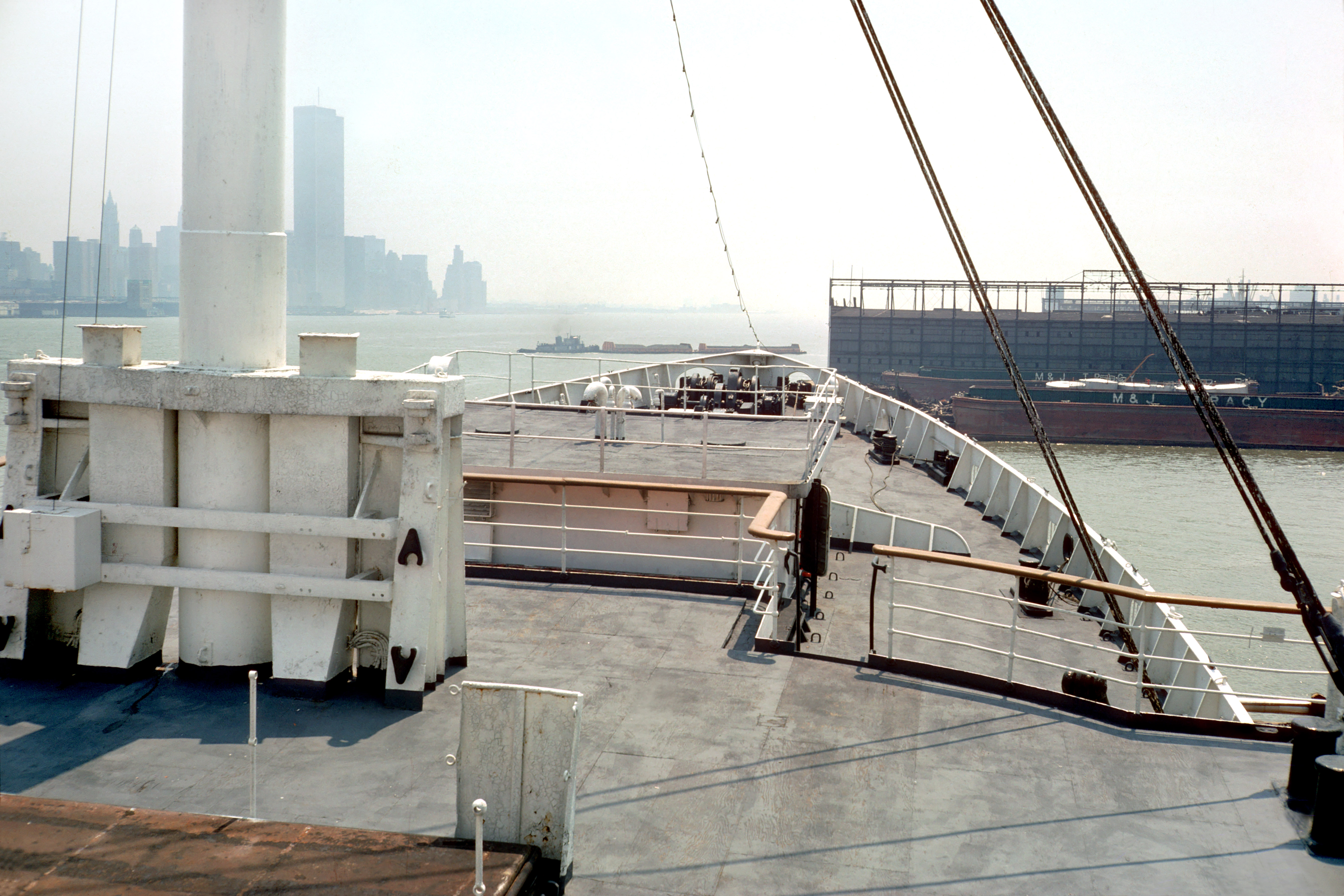
SS Stevens view of bow, from boat deck, looking south toward lower Manhattan

Contrary to her sedentary life as a floating dormitory, the ship's past was filled with travels to numerous ports in Europe and the Far East including Okinawa, Tokyo and Pearl Harbor in the Pacific. As Windsor-class attack transport Dauphin for the US Navy, from 1944 to 1948, she was awarded one battle star in the assault on and occupation of Okinawa and earned the Navy Occupation Service Medal for landing cargo and troops in Japan. She was present in Tokyo Bay for the Surrender Ceremony of World War II on September 2, 1945.

Following the war, and after significant refurbishment, the vessel became the cruise liner Exochorda, a member of the quartet of ships known collectively as "4 Aces" — replacements for the pre-war quartet of ships with the same names — operated by American Export Lines. From 1948 to 1959, Exochorda regularly sailed a 12,000-mile (19,000 km), 45-day circuit from New York to Mediterranean ports such as Casablanca, Marseille, Beirut, Alexandria, Barcelona and Livorno. Among her passengers were potentates of the East, routinely accompanied by cooks and bodyguards. An Arab ruler once brought his entire entourage on board, complete with swords and machine guns. Notable among her passengers was actress Rita Hayworth, a popular film star and dancer. In 1956, Exochorda was called upon to assist in the rapid evacuation of 350 Americans from Alexandria, Egypt during a military conflict that became known as the Suez Crisis.

At the end of her active service in 1959, Exochorda was placed in reserve until plans to sell her were announced in June 1967.

=== Need for student housing ===
As early as 1965, the idea of buying a ship arose as an interim solution to the potential housing gap following the institute's forecast of an increase in student enrollment. By the next year, 1966, the need for additional student housing on the 55-acre (220,000 m^{2}), Hoboken campus had become more evident. With the student body having grown to 1350 students, an increase of about 150 students over the prior year, a strain was created on the institute's existing land-based dormitory housing. Owning suitable waterfront property on the Hudson River, the institute assessed the feasibility of purchasing a ship for temporary use as a dormitory until additional land-based dormitories became available. The institute expected to recoup its original investment in the ship through its continued operation and eventual sale for scrap.

=== Purchase of Exochorda ===
In June 1967, the U.S. Maritime Administration announced plans to sell the former cruise liner, Exochorda, for either non-transportation use or scrap. Assisted by shipbuilding experts, the institute prepared and submitted a bid for the ship. The bid was announced on September 28, 1967. Within one week of the institute's bid, the U.S. Maritime Administration awarded Exochorda to Stevens Institute of Technology for $130,301 — the highest bid and $6,700 more than offered by a scrap metal dealer. The cost of purchasing and refurbishing the ship brought its total cost to approximately $500,000. The total expenditure was not considered excessive when compared to an estimated several million dollars the institute would have had to spend on conventional dormitory housing. "We didn't think a permanent building was a wise investment", said Wilson T. Crisman, the institute's director of auxiliary operations. The institute planned to continue the vessel's operation as a dormitory for several years but intended to take her offline if the student population were to decrease.

=== Refurbishment as floating dormitory ===
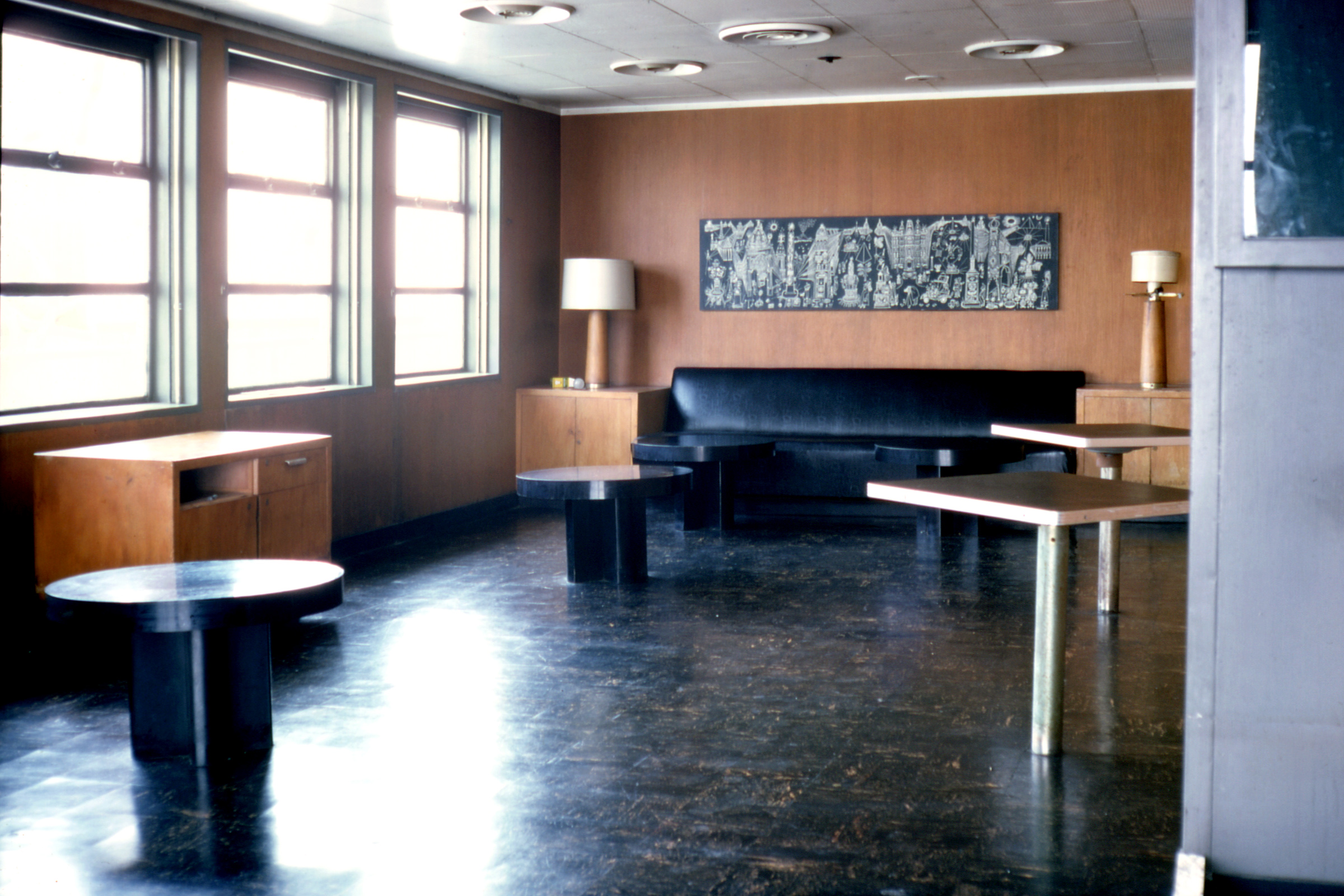
The port side section of Promenade's aft lounge showing one of the Steinberg murals (far wall)

On October 4, 1967, within a week of being purchased by the institute, Exochorda was towed by tugboats from the Hudson River Reserve Fleet in Jones Point, New York, to the Hoboken Yard of Bethlehem Steel Corporation in Hoboken, New Jersey, where refurbishing work prepared the ship to become a floating dormitory. The ship's engines were deactivated and the engine room and cargo hatches were sealed. External utility service ports were installed to permit connecting the ship's electrical, heating, water and sewage systems to land-based utility services. Deck equipment, including the many kingposts and booms used to load and unload the cargo holds, were removed, except for two masts. The hull was painted pristine white. Final preparation for students included adding rugs, mattresses and draperies. Additionally, the air-conditioning system was overhauled.

Wilson T. Crisman, the institute's director of auxiliary operations and boating enthusiast long before the school acquired the vessel, oversaw the ship's purchase and conversion. According to Crisman, the ship was 99 percent in condition for use by the institute, which kept refurbishment costs down.

=== Comparison with Exochorda's cabin plan ===
Formerly occupied by passengers aboard Exochorda, the staterooms located on Promenade deck, "A" deck, and the section of "B" deck forward of the lounge, remained unchanged except for the limited removal of furniture as required to accommodate desks for students. Most staterooms had been designed for three passengers and included upper and lower berths plus a convertible sofa berth. For these rooms, the sofa berth was removed to accommodate a desk. Other changes included the replacement of carpeting, draperies and mattresses. Where possible, rooms not occupied by the traveling public, such as the crew and officers' quarters, were made available as rooms for students. Other rooms on Exochorda that were not suitable for use as either living quarters or public spaces were permanently closed.

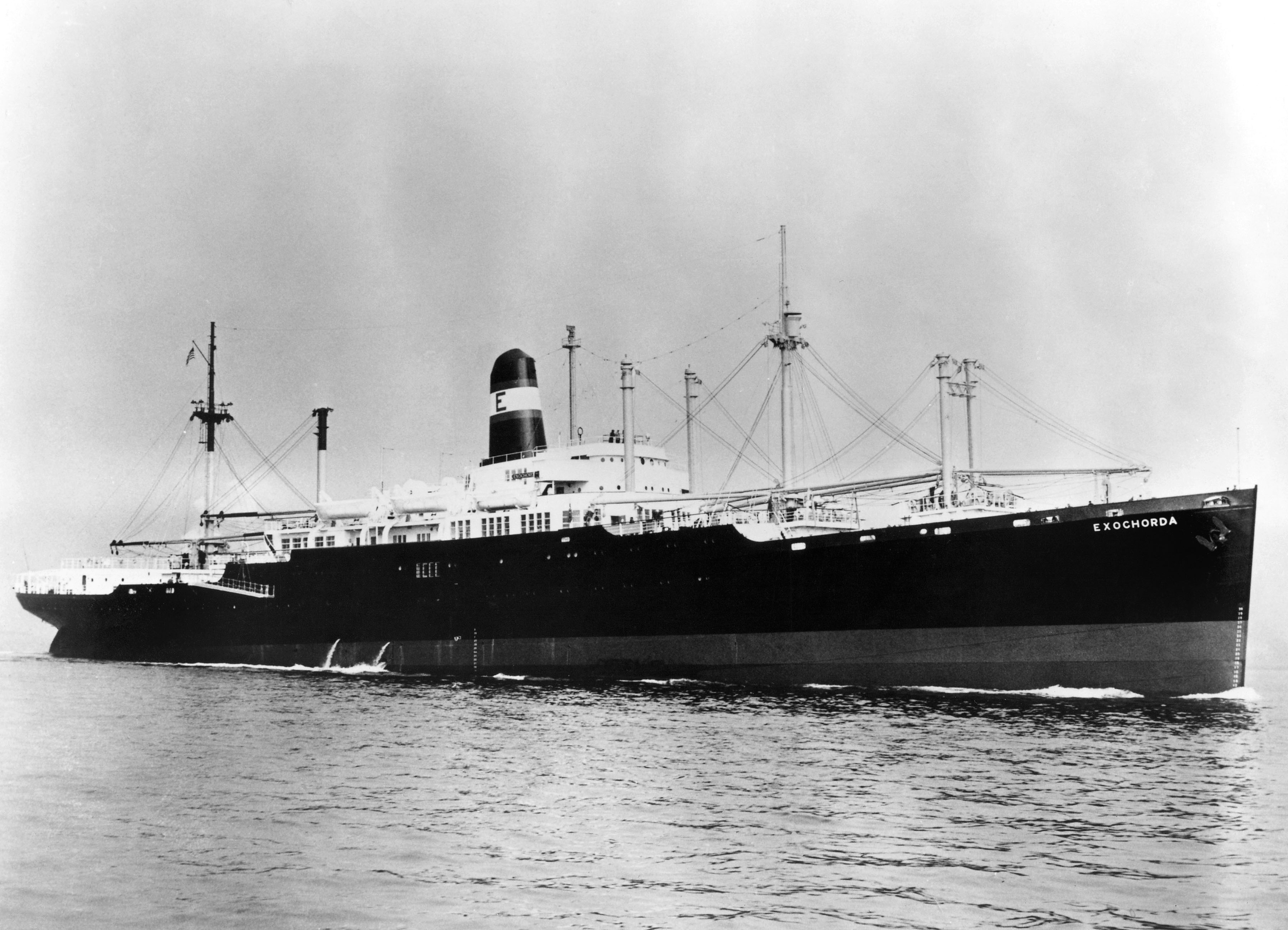
American Export Lines cruise ship SS Exochorda, pictured here circa 1950, prior to her service as SS Stevens

Exochorda's dining hall — on "B" deck, paneled with light, figured walnut and displaying artwork by artist Loren MacIver — became the main lounge on Stevens. The room remained unchanged except for the removal of the artwork and free-standing tables and chairs. Once the location of a table-for-eight on the port side became the site for Stevens' ping-pong table . Despite sloping floors, at times accentuated by weather-induced listing of the ship, the ping-pong table was usually active.

Exochorda contained two suites, both on Promenade deck, that became room numbers 301 and 307 on Stevens.

A popular group of rooms, prominently featured in print ads for Exochorda and known as the Veranda rooms, were groups of four rooms adjoining a common public area that contained four large exterior windows. Two groups of Veranda rooms were on the ship, one on each side of "A" deck. Veranda rooms, unchanged for Stevens, became room numbers: 214, 216, 218 and 220 on the port side, and 217, 219, 221 and 223 on the starboard.

Promenade's forward lounge, the former setting for captain's cocktail parties, and the aft lounge, known on Exochorda as the "bar and smoking lounge" which included Saul Steinberg's Life at Sea murals, remained unchanged except for the removal of free-standing tables and chairs. The center section of carpeting in the forward lounge was also removed, exposing a dance floor.

Exochorda's outdoor swimming pool was located on a small open area of Promenade deck immediately aft of Promenade's smoking bar and lounge. The tiled pool, which measured approximately 12 ft (3.7 m) by 6 ft (1.8 m), was illuminated from above as well as underwater. For Stevens, the pool was deemed too small to be of practical use and was sealed.

Not occupied by passengers on Exochorda, crew quarters were used by students on Stevens. Located aft of the main dining lounge on "B" deck, these rooms were smaller and some lacked amenities such as portholes which were included in the passenger staterooms. The crew cabins, originally designed to sleep six crewmen, were converted into dormitory rooms for two students. Former crew quarters, also on the aft portion of "B" deck, were used to create recreational rooms.

Sun deck which included the wheelhouse, chart room (immediately behind wheelhouse), tiled kennel and dog run (port side) were all closed on Stevens.

Passenger cabin numbers on Exochorda used a letter prefix to signify the deck location. Cabin number sequencing began on Promenade deck and increased to the next hundreds block for each succeeding lower deck, such as, "P1", "A122" and "B201" for cabins on Promenade, "A" and "B" decks, respectively. Room numbers on Stevens omitted the letter prefix and were re-designated to begin in the 100s on the lowest ("B") deck and increased to the next hundreds block for each succeeding higher deck, such as "112", "201" and "314" for rooms on "B", "A" and Promenade decks, respectively. Aside from the difference in level designator, plus a few exceptions for new rooms, the correlation of room numbers on Stevens and Exochorda was maintained. For example, Exochorda's room "A122" became "222" on Stevens.

Captain's and officers' quarters (Boat deck)

| Exochorda | Stevens |
|---|---|
| Chief officer's cabin | Rm 401 |
| Captain's stateroom & office | Presumptively Rm 402, not shown on the cabin plan |
| Jr 3 Officer's cabin | Rm 403 |
| Officers' cabin | Rm 404 |
| Deck Cadet & Engrg Cadet | Rm 405 |
| Officers' lounge | Student lounge - no change |
| Other officer's cabins | Rm 406 through 410 |
| Radio room | Rm 411 |

"A" deck

| Exochorda | Stevens |
|---|---|
| Main Foyer | Unchanged, including Miné Okubo's Mediterranean mural |
| Reception, bell boy room, chief steward, purser, barber shop, gift shop | All adjacent main foyer, were closed |

"B" deck

| Exochorda | Stevens |
|---|---|
| Ship's physician's cabin | Rm 231 |
| Medical office | closed |
| Operating room | closed |
| Men's ward | Rm 241 |
| Women's ward | Rm 239 |
| Chief Engr's cabin and office | Rm 232 |
| 1st Asst Engr's cabin and office | Rm 234 |
| Galley | Partially converted to a laundry room |

== SS Stevens (1967–1975) ==
=== First voyage and early life ===
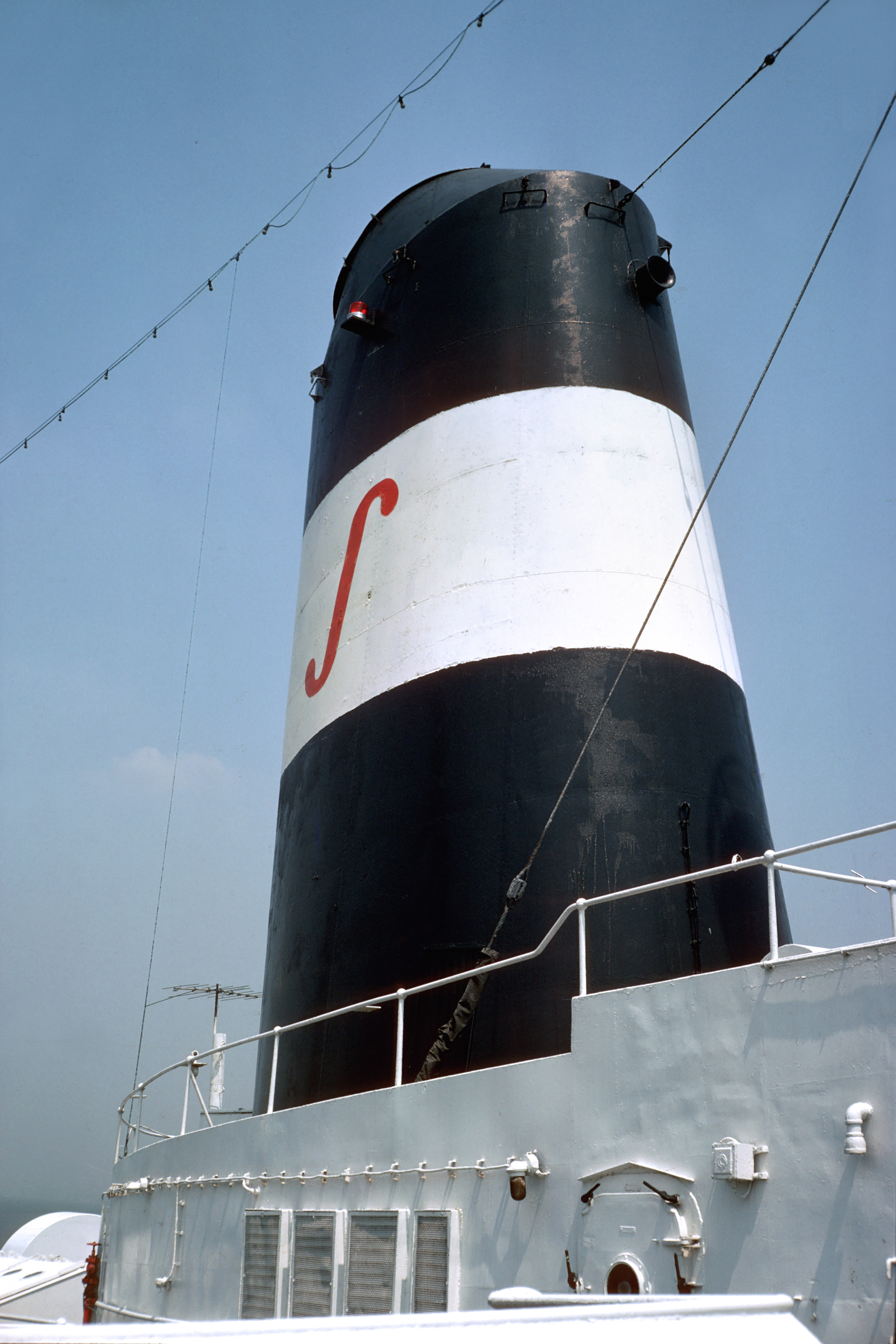
Stevens single cigar-shaped funnel painted with the ship's badge, the integral symbol

On November 10, 1967, with ceremonies similar to those afforded ships on their first voyage, the former Exochorda and the newly refurbished floating dormitory was moved by McAllister Brothers' tugboats from the shipyard to her new berth at the college-owned 8th Street Pier. Two of the shipyard's workmen suffered a minor mishap when the gangplank slipped a few feet while being positioned on the pier.

The ship was rechristened Stevens by Mrs. Jess H. Davis, wife of the institute's president, Dr. Jess H. Davis. The ship was originally named Castle Queen via a contest run by the student body in 1967. The name submitted by Joe Giacone, class of '69, was changed to SS Stevens, which was preferred by Mrs. Davis Dr. Davis and William L. Bingham, dean of student affairs, formally took possession of the ship as the institute's flag was hoisted from the bridge.

Reflecting the technological nature of her namesake, Stevens Institute of Technology, the ship's single cigar-shaped funnel had been painted with an elongated red letter "S", the integral symbol — well known by her student residents through their study and application of the calculus. The ship's name, "Stevens", had also been painted in black letters on her bow.

Connection of water, sewer and electric services with the Hoboken land utilities was facilitated by flexible piping (hoses) and cabling of sufficient length to accommodate the motion of the ship resulting from changing tides or severe weather.

Although she was a complete ship, containing an engine room, wheelhouse, bridge and decks, she was licensed by the State of New Jersey as a residence hall. Designed to the highest Coast Guard standards (1948), fire safety doors and smoke ventilation systems were functional and met local regulations.

The first student residents of Stevens, a total of 150, moved aboard in January 1968.

On May 22, 1968, an open house was held aboard Stevens in honor of National Maritime Day, commemorating the beginning of trans-Atlantic steam navigation.

When the first ocean-going training vessel for the Texas State Maritime Program, USTS Texas Clipper was in need of spare parts, Stevens, with the blessing of the U.S. Maritime Administration, answered her call. As a benefit of their common heritage — Stevens, the former Exochorda, and Texas Clipper, the former Excambion, sisters ships in the post-war "4 Aces" — many parts were interchangeable between the two vessels. The parts were made available to Texas Clipper during her visit to New York in June 1968, the first such visit since her conversion from Excambion.

=== Accommodations ===
In 1968, the per-student cost of a room for one semester ranged from $200 to $265, depending on available amenities such as portholes and private showers. By 1975, the cost of a room with two students had risen to approximately $650 per student, per semester.

Rooms were equipped with desks and lamps, many of which were fixed in place, a common feature among seafaring vessels. Heating and air-conditioning were controlled by a thermostat in each room, a significant feature also enjoyed by ocean-going passengers aboard Exochorda, one of the first fully air-conditioned ships.

Most rooms were fitted with "ingeniously arranged oversize downy berths" — 79" by 34" roll-up beds operated by "an ingenious new device which by the simple turn of a wheel recesses the berths flush into the wall". Prominent in Exochorda's advertising literature, the roll-up berths facilitated the conversion of rooms from sleeping quarters at night to spacious sitting rooms by day. The two large suites on the Promenade deck, featured twin beds.

The teak and dark blue leather chairs, depicted in many print ads and brochures for the "4 Aces", remained in the rooms.

While a typical room harbored the usual complement of personal items such as a television, stereo and refrigerator, students aboard the ship were afforded more latitude regarding individual décor as compared to their land-based counterparts. Among the decorative touches found in rooms were oil paintings, hanging plants and a Persian print bedspread billowing from a sitting room ceiling.

For convenience, public telephones were available at multiple locations on the ship and were also available in rooms for an additional fee.

Art Deco trim and accents, evoking visions of a bygone era, graced her stairways and passageways. On cabin doors, life jacket and lifeboat informational placards, having lost their vital significance to time and circumstance, remained dutifully posted.

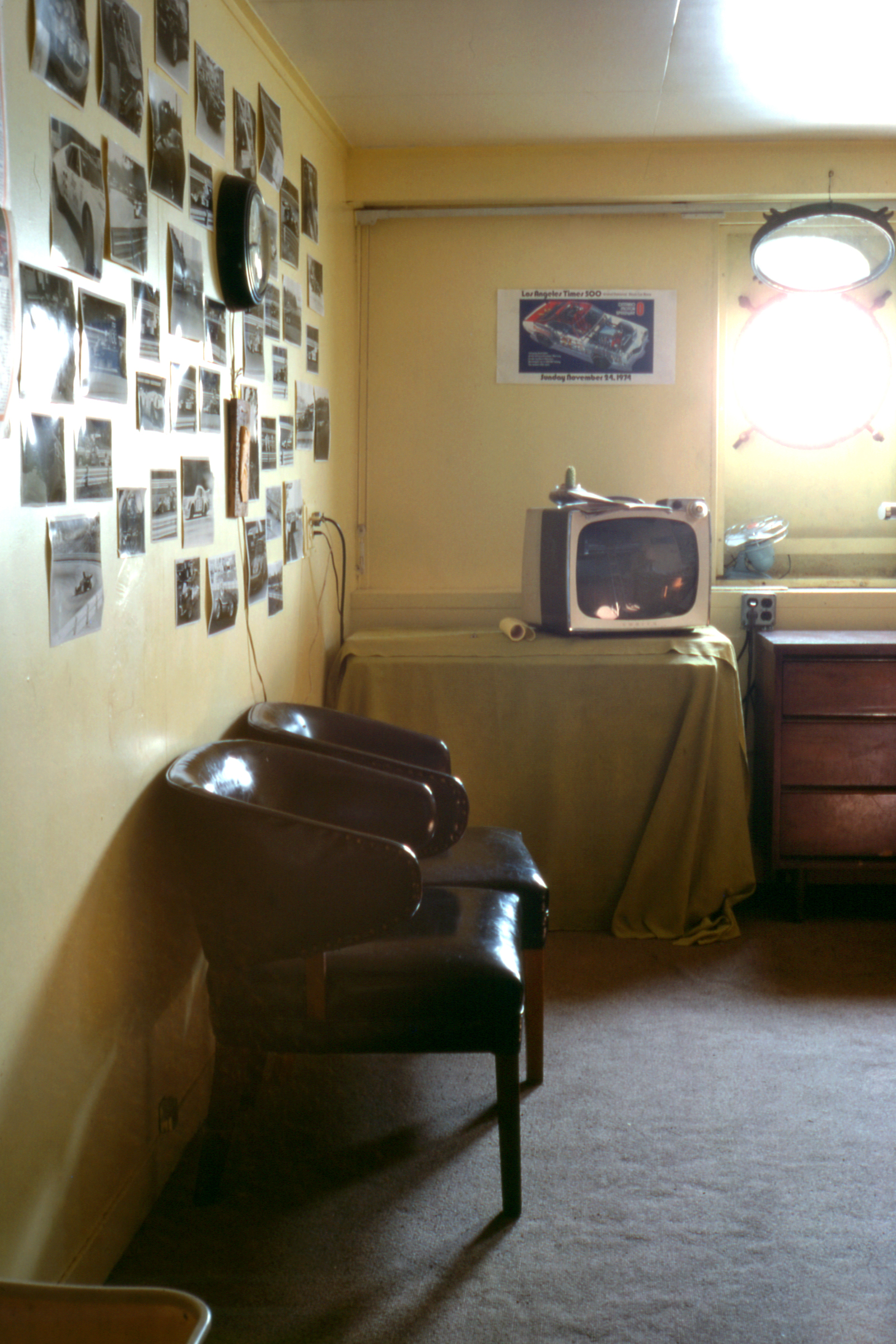
Room view from doorway

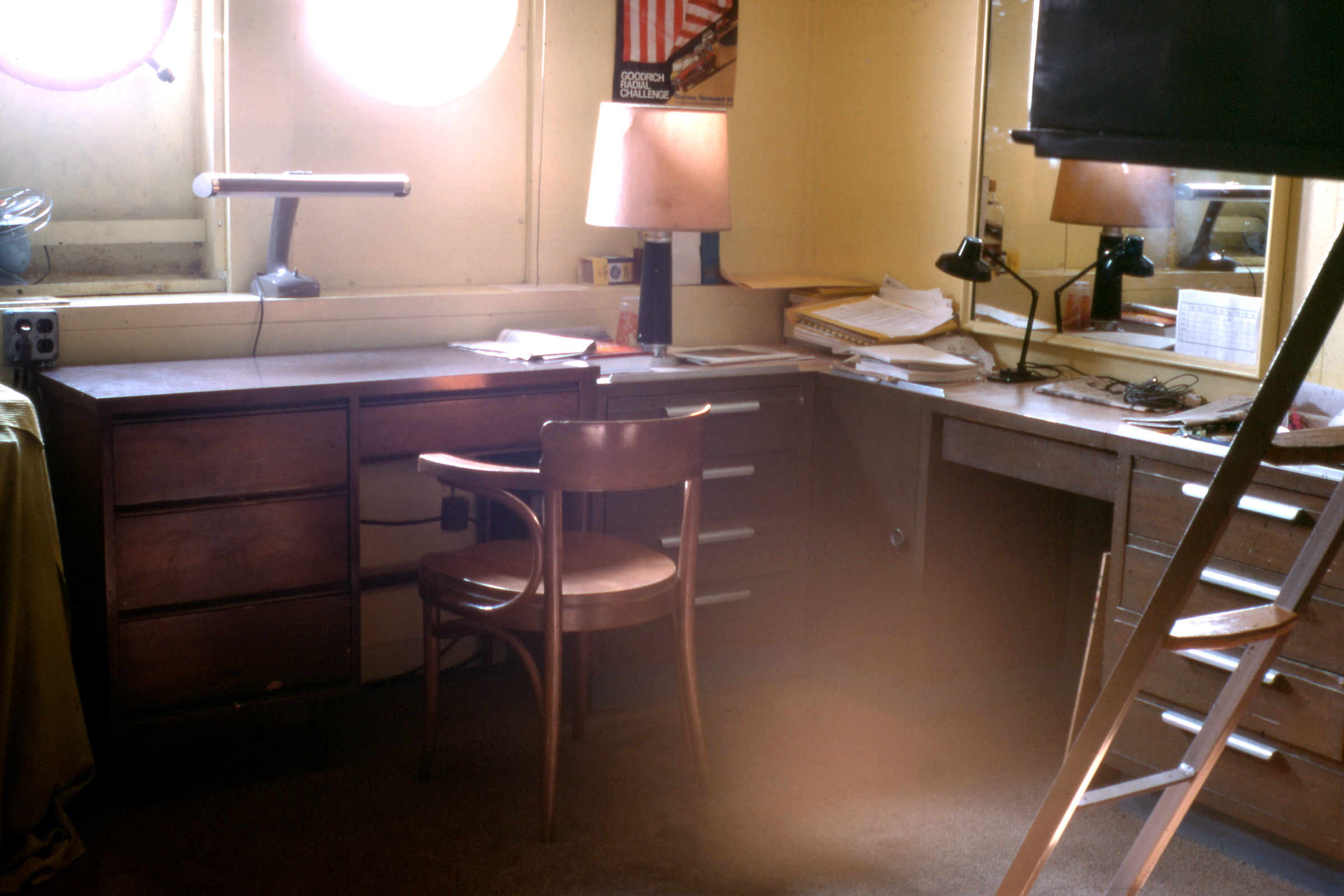
Room view of desk

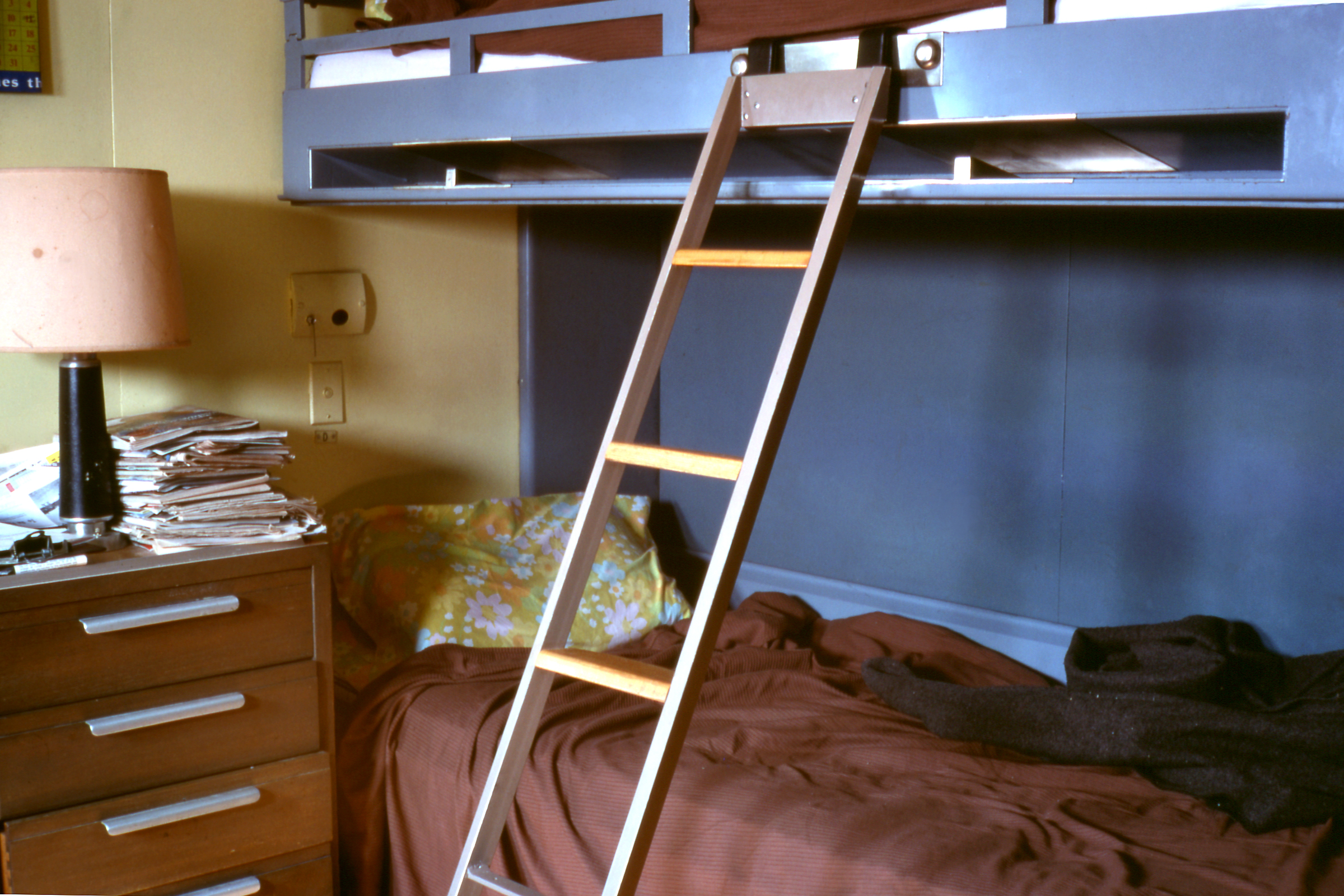
Room view of bunk beds

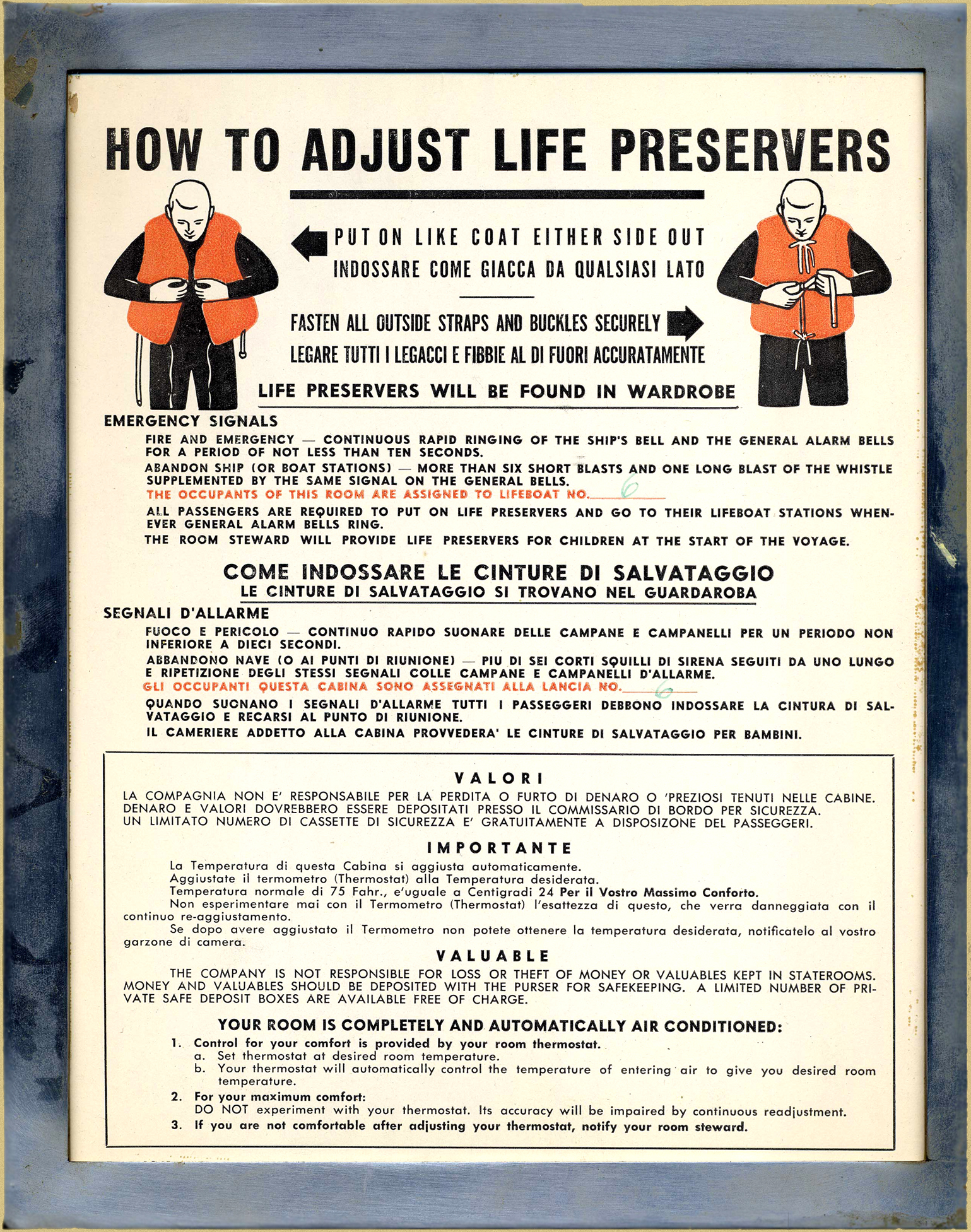
Life preserver information placard

Reminiscent of her former glory days on the high seas, a mural reflecting the ship's Mediterranean sailing route, by Miné Okubo, decorated the main foyer. White-on-black depictions of life at sea — whimsical "doodles" by artist Saul Steinberg — added subtle context to Promenade's bar and smoking lounge. Other artwork, however, such as Loren MacIver's mural portrayal of trade and commerce activities along the sailing route, originally in the ship's dining room ("B" deck lounge), had been removed prior to the ship's use as a dormitory. Sculptor Mitzi Solomon's marble carvings, pictured in the promenade's forward lounge in many "4 Aces" print advertisements, were also not seen by students.

=== Rules and regulations ===
Rules and regulations were loose except for prohibitions against excessive noise or vandalism, including breaking into refrigerators. For safety reasons, those on board were warned: "Students will not be allowed to climb, hang or swing from any of the riggings, lifeboats or railings." Resident dormitory representatives could often remedy such infractions with measures that included requiring the offending student to leave the ship. Other rules stated that visitors were not permitted to be on the ship between 4 and 7 am. Although women students were first admitted to the institute in 1971, they were prohibited from living on the ship until 1974. Commenting on the effect of women living aboard the ship, student resident Tom Poncho said, "Not much." By 1975, nine women shared the ship with 91 men.

=== Popular with students ===
Despite the quiet and remote location of Stevens relative to the center of campus, rooms on the ship remained very much in demand. Many of Stevens residents were delighted with their living arrangements and preferred the ship over conventional dormitory housing. Institute officials postulated that Stevens' popularity may have been due, in part, to the ship's appeal to "loners", a supposition consistent with students' statements. "It's quiet down here, more secluded and peaceful", said ship resident Kenneth Levy. Expressing a similar sentiment, resident Frank Condi said, "It's away from everything." Other students, however, recognized the social advantages offered by their unique dwelling. Ship resident Martin Mercorelli remarked that the ship was "definitely a social asset. It seems to go over better with the girls." Other students indicated their preference for the ship by their unflattering characterization of other dormitory rooms as "cells".

In 1975, when announcing that the ship was to be sold, Kenneth C. Rogers, president of the institute, commented that the ship was "so popular with the students." Linda Soldati, one of the nine women students living on the ship said, "If I had $100,000 I'd buy her. I just don't want to go back to living in a house. The view is fantastic. I love the ship."

=== Escalating costs ===
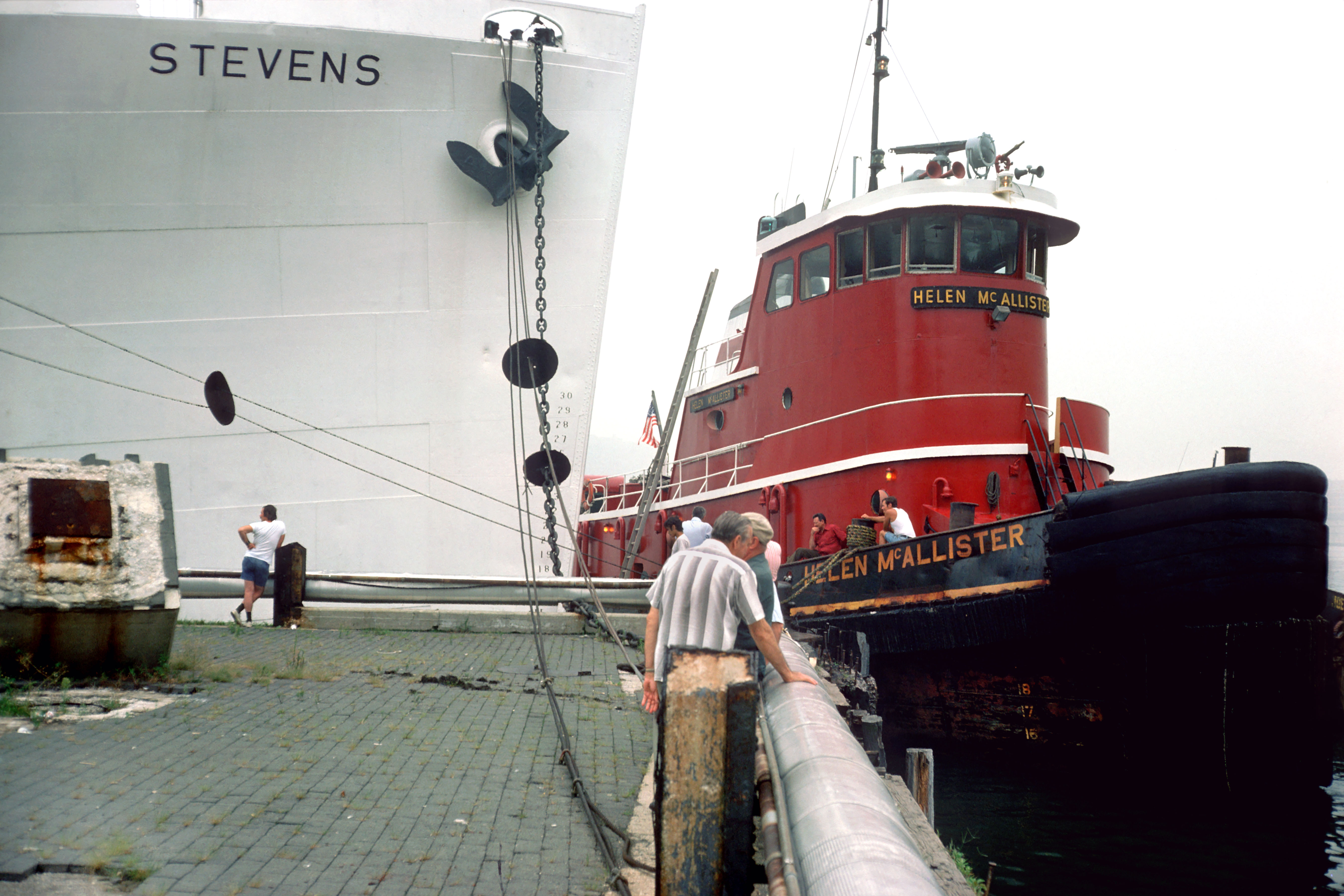
Tugboat Helen McAllister prepares to tow Stevens on her final voyage, August 26, 1975

During the initial five years of operation, maintenance and repair costs for Stevens were comparable to those of a land-based dormitory. In early 1973, the institute had anticipated operating Stevens for another five years.

Within the next two years, however, declining enrollments, rising costs of heating the vessel and needed repairs prompted the institute to reassess the economics of maintaining Stevens. In 1975, heating for the steel-hulled ship, which was delivered from land via steam pipe, cost the institute $40,000 per year. As explained by institute president Kenneth C. Rogers, "Heating that ship is like trying to heat the whole Hudson River." Adding to the financial burden, the need for extensive water system repair work became evident when the interior of a six-inch (152 mm) section of the ship's water pipe was found to be nearly completely encrusted by rust. After allowing for necessary painting and electrical wiring upgrades, the cost estimate for repairs totaled $100,000, forcing the institute's decision in April 1975 to sell the ship.

=== Farewell ===
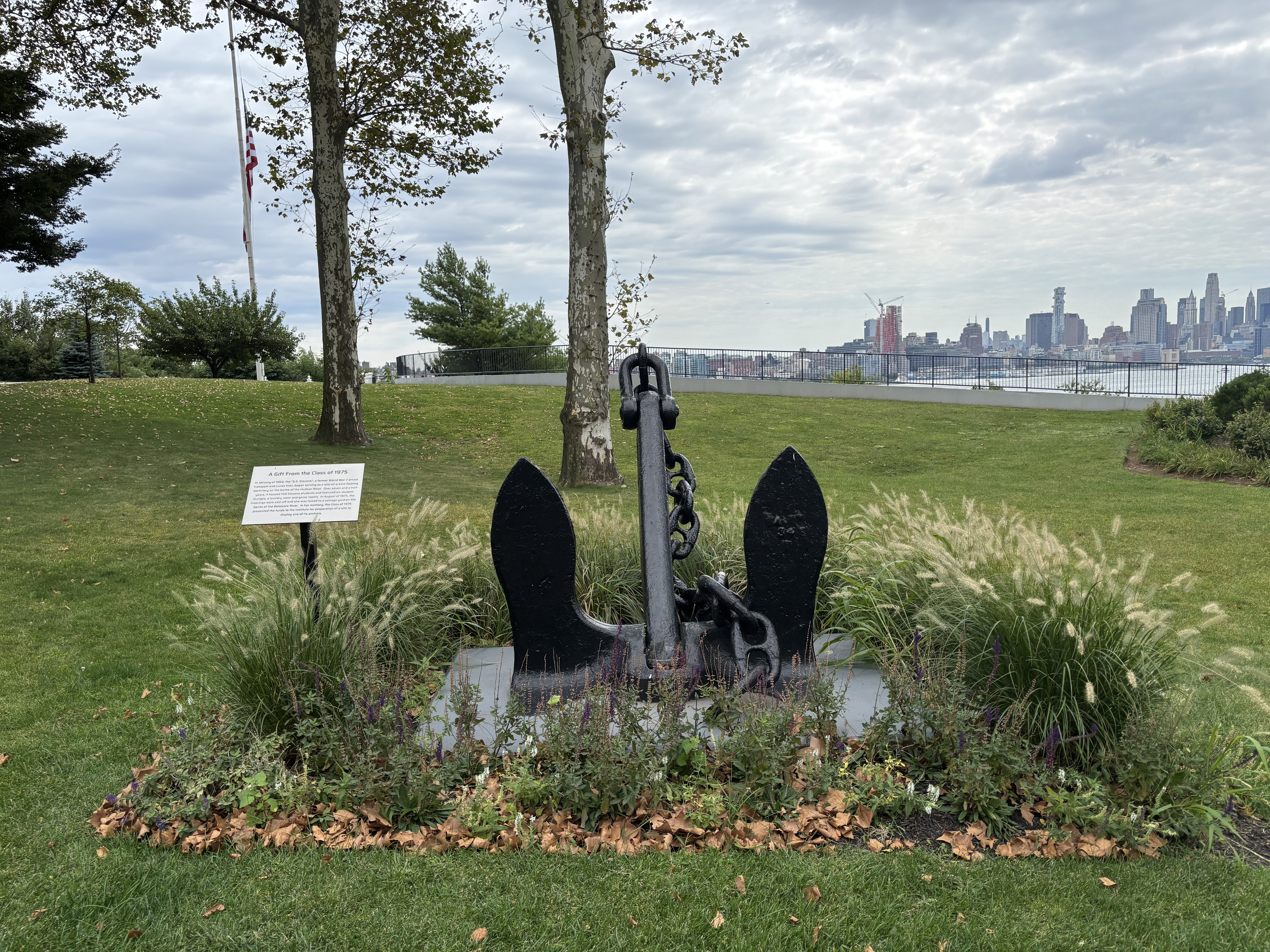
Six-ton anchor from SS Stevens on the campus of Stevens Institute of Technology placed in memory of the institute's floating dormitory.

In May 1975, shortly before Stevens was to be closed and sold, she "hosted" a large and memorable farewell party held in her honor. A "For Sale" sign on her bow — for students, a melancholic reminder of her impending fate — had been posted by a prankster. On the day following graduation, May 23, 1975, the last student to leave the country's only floating dormitory, William Walendzinski, a graduating senior and Stevens resident for the prior 3 years, descended her main gangplank for the final time.

On August 26, 1975, at 3:00 PM, the last of her mooring cables was burned away. Without fanfare, tugboat Helen McAllister and two other Tony McAllister's '21 tugboats, part of the same fleet that brought Stevens to her berth in Hoboken in 1967, towed her to a Chester, Pennsylvania shipyard.

Students of the Class of 1975 presented funds to the institute for the preparation of a site on Wittpenn Walk, overlooking the ship's berthing area, where one of Stevens' six-ton anchors was placed in tribute to "the Ship", their "floating dormitory". The anchor was briefly removed during the construction of the UCC Towers, but was brought back after student advocacy in April 2024. It is said that, if one sprinkles water from the Palmer Fountain on the anchor, one's most fervent desires will come true.

Recounting the events and sentiments on the day Stevens was towed away, the institute's alumni association expressed in its journal, "She disappeared into the fog and into our hearts."

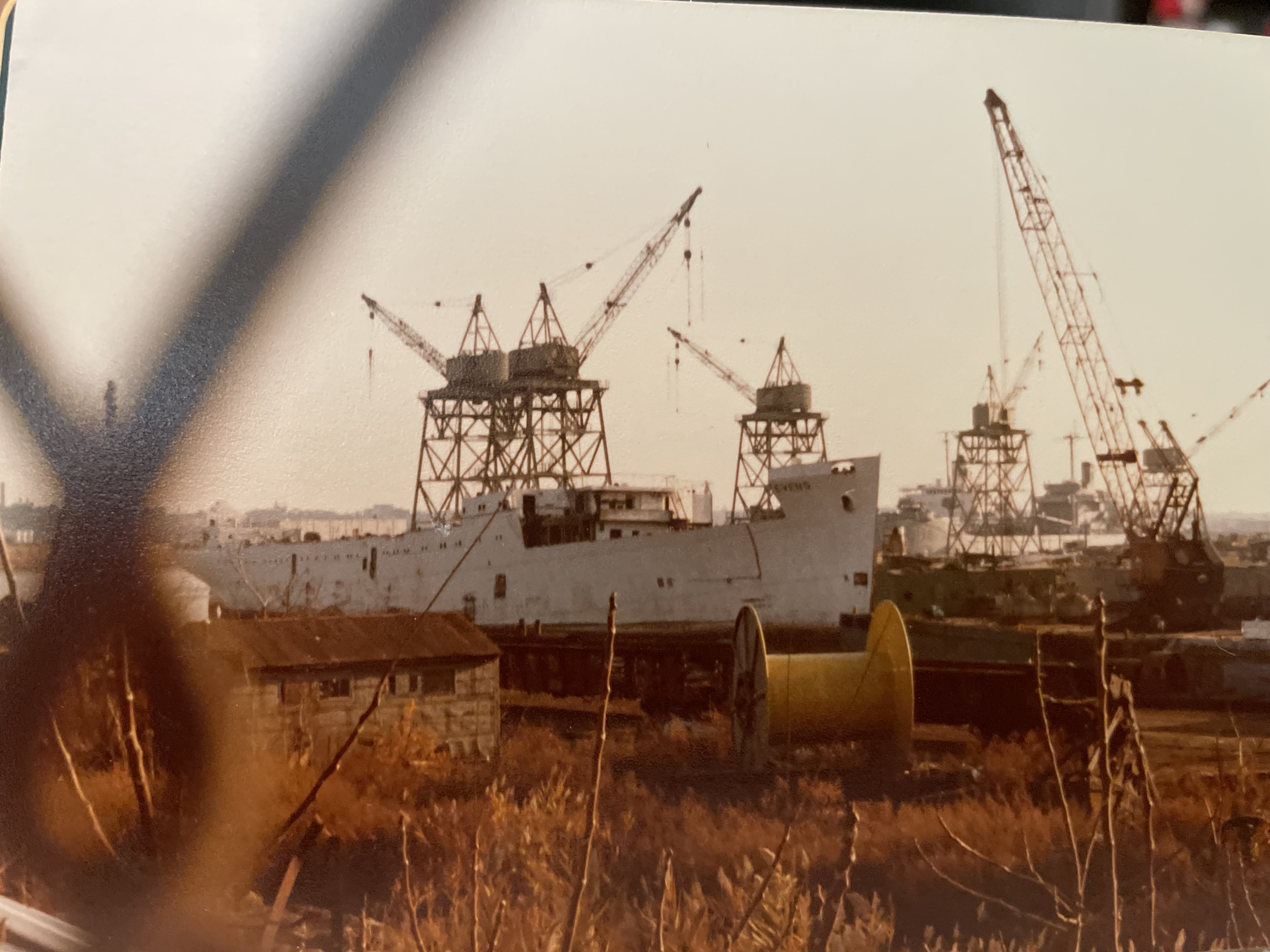
The SS Stevens being dismantled in a scrap yard in Kearny, NJ. Photo courtesy of Tom Golembiewski

After being partially dismantled in Chester, Pennsylvania, Stevens was resold to scrappers in Kearny, NJ, in March 1979. Later, the remaining hulk was towed to the Raritan Bay port for final demolition, bringing an end to one of the most unusual careers of a ship.

== Timeline of vessel ==
- USS Dauphin (APA-97)
  - December 22, 1943 — Laid down (as cargo ship)
  - June 10, 1944 — Completed as Windsor-class military attack transport and launched by Bethlehem Sparrows Point Shipyard, Sparrows Point, Maryland
  - September 23, 1944 — Transferred to Navy and commissioned as Dauphin
  - September 2, 1945 — Present at the Surrender Ceremony of World War II in Tokyo Bay
  - April 30, 1946 — Dauphin decommissioned
  - 1948 — Dauphin sold for commercial service
- SS Exochorda
  - 1948 — Refurbished as passenger-cargo ship, SS Exochorda, for American Export Lines
  - November 2, 1948 — Maiden voyage of Exochorda
  - 1948–1959 — Exochorda served as passenger-cargo ship sailing from New York to the Mediterranean
  - March 15, 1959 — Exochorda towed to Bethlehem Steel Corp. for preparation to be placed in reserve fleet
  - 1959–1967 — Returned to the US Maritime Administration and mothballed in Hudson River Reserve Fleet at Stony Point, NY
  - June 1967 — The U.S. Maritime Administration announced plans to sell the former cruise liner, Exochorda, for either non-transportation use or scrap
  - September 28, 1967 — Announcement of the institute's bid of $130,301 for Exochorda
  - October 1967 — US Maritime Administration awards Exochorda to Stevens Institute of Technology for $130,301 to be used as a floating dormitory
  - October 4, 1967 — Exochorda was towed from the Hudson River Reserve Fleet in Jones Point, N.Y. to the Hoboken Yard of Bethlehem Steel Corporation in Hoboken, New Jersey to be refurbished as a dormitory
  - November 10, 1967 — Vessel towed from the Bethlehem Steel Corporation to the school-owned Eight Street Pier, Stevens Institute of Technology, Hoboken, NJ
- SS Stevens
  - November 10, 1967 — Maiden voyage (unpowered)
  - November 1967 — Christened SS Stevens
  - January 1968 — First student residents of Stevens moved aboard
  - May 22, 1968 — Stevens hosted an open house in honor of National Maritime Day
  - June 1968 — Stevens donated parts to her sister ship, USTS Texas Clipper, the former Excambion
  - September 1974 — First women students permitted to reside on Stevens
  - April 1975 — Rising heating and repair costs forced the institute to sell Stevens
  - May 1975 — Farewell party held aboard Stevens
  - May 23, 1975 — Last student leaves Stevens
  - August 26, 1975 — Last Voyage: towed from Hoboken NJ to a shipyard in Chester, PA
  - 1975–1979 — Partially dismantled in Chester, PA
  - March 1979 — Resold to scrappers at Kearny, NJ
  - 1979 — Demolished at Raritan Bay port NJ

== Notes ==
a: Brochures and print ads published by American Export Lines identified their quartet of ships as "4 Aces", as opposed to "Four Aces".

b: In 1964, American Export Lines merged with Isbrandtsen Co., becoming American Export-Isbrandtsen Lines.

c: In 1959, Exochorda became the first of the post-war "4 Aces" ships to be deactivated. She was returned to the U.S. Maritime Administration where she was mothballed and assigned to the Hudson River Reserve Fleet at Stony Point, N.Y.

d: Unlike a Murphy bed which tilts up into the wall by rotating on a hinge attached to short axis of the bed (head or foot), Stevens' berths tilted into the wall by rotating about the long axis, the side of the berth.

e: The upper and lower berths — similar to bunk beds but without corner posts — rolled up or down independently of each other (each berth having its own hand crank). Access to the upper berth was facilitated by a ladder that was stowed in a horizontal slot in the frame of the upper berth before rolling the bed up into the wall.

f: The outdoor swimming pool on Exochorda's cabin plan is depicted as a rectangle drawn within the black (roughly trapezoidal) open deck area immediately aft of the bar and lounge on Promenade deck. Stevens' plan does not show the rectangle for the pool which had been sealed.

g: Swimming pool dimensions are determined by scale measurements of Exochorda's cabin plan.

h: Miné (pronounced "MEE-nah") Okubo, a Japanese American author and artist, created the Mediterranean mural map for the main foyer on SS Exochorda. Ms. Okubo was best known for her book, Citizen 13660, published in 1946 and winner of the 1984 American Book Award. Through artistry and brief text, the book recounts her experience while being held in the Japanese American internment camps at Tanforan and Topaz, during 1942. By virtue of its location, the mural was in view of all Stevens students (and Exochorda passengers) entering or leaving the ship by way of the main gangplank, which connected to the main foyer.

i: Saul Steinberg, a cartoonist and illustrator, well known for his many "New Yorker" magazine cover drawings, created large murals for Exochorda and other "4 Aces" ships. Stevens contained three Steinberg murals, all located in the aft lounge on Promenade deck. A large, 11-panel mural was located above the bar, and two smaller, single-panel murals were located on the walls opposite the bar, one on the starboard side and one on the port. The large mural aboard sister ship, Texas Clipper, the former Excambion, was the subject of a Texas Parks and Wildlife Department video that described the serendipitous discovery of the mural prior to sinking Texas Clipper as an artificial reef off Brownsville, Texas. When asked to estimate the value of the unusually large (22 ft.) mural, — according to Dale Shively, Artificial Reef Coordinator for Texas Parks and Wildlife — the Steinberg Foundation responded, "not millions of dollars, but it's probably at least six figures".

j: An accomplished American artist from New York, Loren MacIver painted a different dining room mural for each of the new "4 Aces" ships.

k: In May 1950, the cost for a mid-priced room on Exochorda (room A101, with private shower, toilet and trunk space) for the complete 12,000-mile, 42-day round trip from New York was $1110 per person, double occupancy. The voyage included 10 stopovers at seven Mediterranean ports of call and Boston prior to returning to New York.

l: The Eighth Street pier was removed after the ship was sold. River Road, the street adjoining the pier at the foot of the campus, was later renamed Frank Sinatra Drive.

m: Initially open to students, the wheelhouse was later closed.

n: The U.S. Maritime Administration assumed responsibility for maintaining the national defense reserve merchant fleet following the abolishment of the U.S. Maritime Commission on May 24, 1950.

o: Varying ship capacity and student occupancy numbers are cited in the references:

- Ship capacity: 142.; 175.; About 200
- Student Occupancy: 70, in 1968; As many as 150; 150

p: In 1968, the gangplank to the main "A" Deck was a single, uncovered ramp that was subsequently replaced with a double-ramped covered gangplank.

q: A ship named Exochorda and member of the pre-war "4 Aces" is not in the lineage of Stevens. The pre-war Exochorda had been converted to military transport USS Harry Lee, later sold to Turkish Maritime Lines and renamed Tarsus.

r: Mitzi Solomon created two marble sculptures for the new "4 Aces" ships.

s: Sun deck, the cruise line's less technical designation used in its "4 Aces" cabin plan, would more commonly be referred to as the Bridge.

t: All artwork for the "4 Aces" ships had been selected by noted industrial designer Henry Dreyfuss.

u: In architecture, "veranda" commonly refers to a roofed area on the exterior of a building, open on one side, such as an open porch. However, the lounges in the ship's veranda rooms were closed by four large windows.
