= SS Exochorda =

Ocean liner (1944–1979)

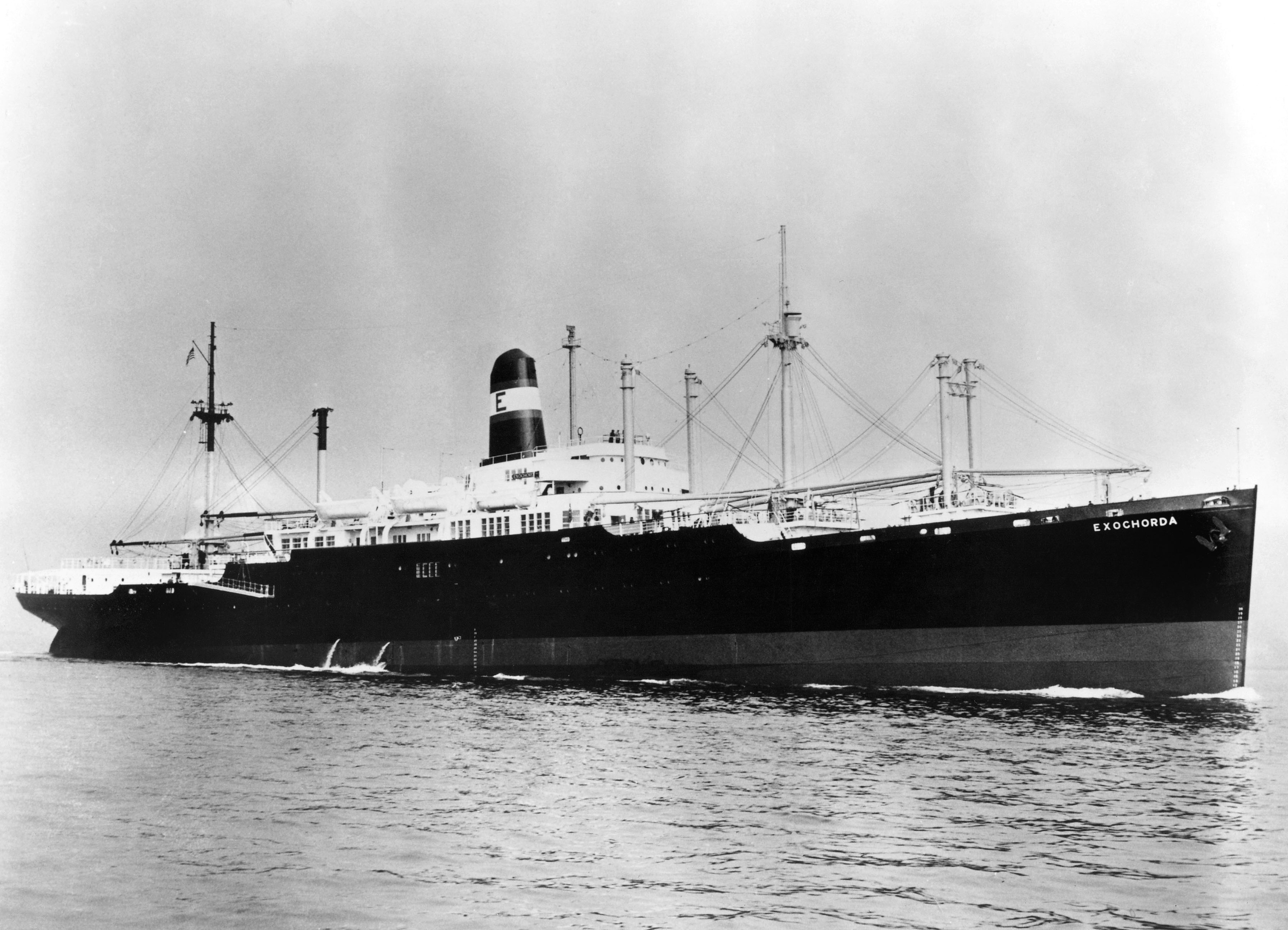
- SS Exochorda of the New "4 Aces," circa 1950

History

United States
- Name: SS Exochorda
- Namesake: SS Exochorda of the pre-war "4 Aces"
- Builder: Bethlehem Steel, Sparrow Point Shipyard, Sparrow Point, MD
- Laid down: 2 December 1943 (as cargo ship)
- Launched: 10 June 1944 (as USS Dauphin (APA-97))
- Sponsored by: Mary B. Cooke (as USS Dauphin)
- Christened: USS Dauphin (APA-97)
- Acquired: 1947 (as Exochorda)
- In service: November 1948 (as Exochorda)
- Out of service: 1959
- Renamed: Exochorda (1948), SS Stevens (1967)
- Honors and awards: One Battle star, Navy Occupation Service Medal (as Dauphin)
- Fate: Sold for scrap 1975 (as Stevens). Scrapped in Chester, PA, Kearny, NJ, Raritan Bay port, 1979

General characteristics
- Type: Hull type C3-S-A3
- Tonnage: 9,644 dead weight tons; 7,300 cargo tons
- Displacement: 14,893 tons
- Length: 473 ft, 1 in
- Beam: 66 ft, 2 in
- Draft: 25 ft
- Propulsion: Geared turbine engines, single screw, 8,000 hp
- Capacity: 125 Passengers, 131 crew, 392,000 ft^{3} cargo
- Notes: Maritime Commission hull no. 4419 while under construction, later MC hull no. 1675

This article describes a post-war "new 4 Aces" ship. A pre-war ship of the same name was a member of the original "4 Aces."

SS Exochorda was a 473-foot, 14,500-ton cargo liner in service with American Export Lines from 1948 to 1959. A member of the line's post-war quartet of ships, "4 Aces", Exochorda sailed regularly from New York on a Mediterranean route. Originally built in 1944 as the military attack transport USS Dauphin (APA-97), the ship was extensively refurbished prior to her service as a passenger-cargo liner. Following her service as a cruise liner, the vessel served as the floating dormitory ship SS Stevens for the students of Stevens Institute of Technology, a technological university, in Hoboken, NJ. At the end of her service life she was scrapped, in 1979.

== Acquisition ==
After World War II, American Export Lines purchased four C3-class Windsor-class attack transports built by Bethlehem Shipbuilding Corp. at Sparrow's Point, Maryland, had them refitted as passenger-cargo liners, and placed them in service as the new "4 Aces." USS Dauphin became Exochorda.

While in US Navy service from 1944 to 1948 Dauphin was awarded one battle star in the assault on and occupation of Okinawa and earned the Navy Occupation Service Medal for landing cargo and troops in Japan. She was present in Tokyo Bay for the Surrender Ceremony of World War II, 2 September 1945.

Following the war, in November 1947, the ships were returned to dry dock at the Hoboken Yard of Bethlehem Steel Corporation for conversion into passenger cargo ships for American Export Lines. Dauphin became Exochorda of the post-war "4 Aces", taking her new name from her predecessor in the pre-war fleet.

== Extensive refurbishment ==
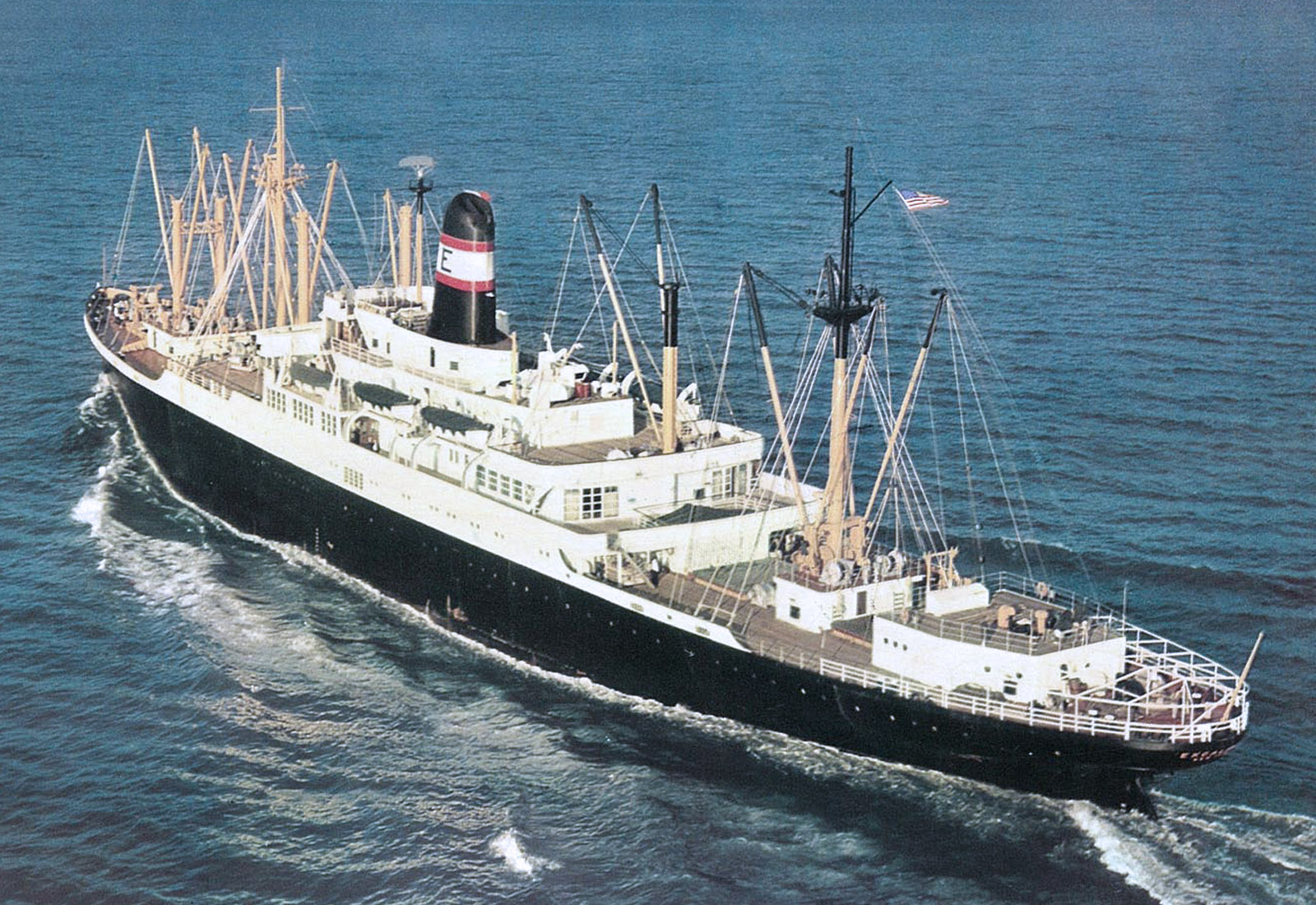
Brochure photo of SS Exochorda's nearly identical sister ship SS Excalibur, circa 1961, in the New "4 Aces."

Fashioning the modern (1948) cruise liner Exochorda from Dauphin required stripping the vessel to the bare hull and machinery. An entirely new superstructure was built that included passenger staterooms located primarily on promenade and "A" decks.

Noted industrial decorator Henry Dreyfuss, whose many designs included the "Twentieth Century Limited" locomotive (1938) for the New York Central Railroad, and the "500" desk telephone (1949), the Bell System standard for 45 years, designed the interiors. Zalud Marine Corporation executed the design, including joiner work, that included thousands of feet of carpet, specially woven fabrics and an unusual amount of glass.

Exochorda was among the first ships with fully air-conditioned staterooms, many of which were also soundproofed. The ship's glass-enclosed promenade deck featured a built-in swimming pool and play area adjacent to a modern bar and smoking room.

Sea safety standards were unusually high and included modern (1948) smoke detection, fire control and fireproofing.

On the day following her final sea trials, 26 October 1948, the ship was formally delivered to American Export Lines at the company's terminal at Exchange Place, Jersey City, NJ. Delivery had been delayed due to a faulty valve that needed replacement. Exochorda departed on her maiden voyage in November 1948.

== Artwork ==
All artwork for the new 4 Aces ships had been selected by interior designer Henry Dreyfuss. Dreyfuss had commissioned artist Miné Okubo to create a mural reflecting the ship's Mediterranean sailing route, to be located in the ship's main foyer. Other notable artwork included white-on-black depictions of life at sea — whimsical "doodles" by artist Saul Steinberg — which added subtle context to Promenade's bar and smoking lounge. While in the dining lounge, passengers were treated to Loren MacIver's mural portrayal of trade and commerce activities along the sailing route. Despite being pictured in the promenade's forward lounge in many "4 Aces" print advertisements, sculptor Mitzi Solomon had created only two unique marble carvings that were used on other "4 Aces" vessels.

== Timeline of vessel ==
- USS Dauphin (APA-97)
  - 22 December 1943 — Laid down (as cargo ship)
  - 10 June 1944 — Completed as Windsor-class military attack transport and launched by Bethlehem Sparrows Point Shipyard, Sparrows Point, Maryland
  - 23 September 1944 — Transferred to Navy and commissioned as Dauphin
  - 2 September 1945 — Present at the Surrender Ceremony of World War II in Tokyo Bay
  - 30 April 1946 — Dauphin decommissioned
  - 1948 — Dauphin sold for commercial service
- SS Exochorda
  - 1948 — Refurbished as passenger-cargo ship, SS Exochorda, for American Export Lines
  - 2 November 1948 — Maiden voyage of Exochorda
  - 1948–1959 — Exochorda served as passenger-cargo ship sailing from New York to the Mediterranean
  - 15 March 1959 — Exochorda towed to Bethlehem Steel Corp. for preparation to be placed in reserve fleet
  - 1959–1967 — Returned to the US Maritime Administration and mothballed in Hudson River Reserve Fleet at Stony Point, NY
  - June 1967 — The U.S. Maritime Administration announced plans to sell the former cruise liner, Exochorda, for either non-transportation use or scrap
  - 28 September 1967 — Announcement of Stevens Institute of Technology's bid of $130,301 for Exochorda
  - October 1967 — US Maritime Administration awards Exochorda to Stevens Institute of Technology for $130,301 to be used as a floating dormitory
  - 4 October 1967 — Exochorda was towed from the Hudson River Reserve Fleet in Jones Point, N.Y. to the Hoboken Yard of Bethlehem Steel Corporation in Hoboken, New Jersey to be refurbished as a dormitory
  - 10 November 1967 — Vessel towed from the Bethlehem Steel Corporation to the school-owned Eight Street Pier, Stevens Institute of Technology, Hoboken, NJ
- SS Stevens
  - November 1967 — Christened SS Stevens
  - January 1968 — First student residents of Stevens moved aboard
  - 23 May 1975 — Last student leaves Stevens
  - 26 August 1975 — Last Voyage: towed from Hoboken NJ to a shipyard in Chester, PA
  - 1975–1979 — Partially dismantled in Chester, PA
  - March 1979 — Resold to scrappers at Kearny, NJ

== Notes ==
a: A ship named Exochorda and member of the pre-war "4 Aces" is not in the lineage of the post-war Exochorda. The pre-war Exochorda had been converted to military transport USS Harry Lee, later sold to Turkish Maritime Lines and renamed Tarsus.

b: In 1964, American Export Lines merged with Isbrandtsen Co., becoming American Export-Isbrandtsen Lines.

c: Brochures and print ads published by American Export Lines identified their quartet of ships as "4 Aces", as opposed to "Four Aces" (see 4 Aces ad).

d: Miné (pronounced "MEE-nah") Okubo, a Japanese American author and artist, was best known for her book, Citizen 13660, published in 1946 and winner of the 1984 American Book Award. Through artistry and brief text, the book recounts her experience while being held in the Japanese American internment camps at Tanforan and Topaz, during 1942. By virtue of its location, Okubo's Mediterranean mural was in view of all Exochorda passengers entering or leaving the ship by way of the main gangplank, which connected to the main foyer.

e: Saul Steinberg, a cartoonist and illustrator, well known for his many "New Yorker" magazine cover drawings, created large murals for Exochorda and other "4 Aces" ships. Stevens contained three Steinberg murals, all located in the aft lounge on the Promenade deck. A large, 11-panel mural was located above the bar, and two smaller, single-panel murals were located on the walls opposite the bar, one on the starboard side and one on the port. The large mural aboard sister ship, Texas Clipper, the former Excambion, was the subject of a Texas Parks and Wildlife Department video that described the serendipitous discovery of the mural prior to sinking Texas Clipper as an artificial reef off Brownsville, Texas. When asked to estimate the value of unusually large (22 ft.) mural,—according to Dale Shively, Artificial Reef Coordinator for Texas Parks and Wildlife—the Steinberg Foundation responded, "not millions of dollars, but it's probably at least six figures".

f: An accomplished American artist from New York, Loren MacIver painted a different dining room mural for each of the new "4 Aces" ships.
