= Admiral Dewey (tugboat) =

American harbor tugboat (1900–2021)

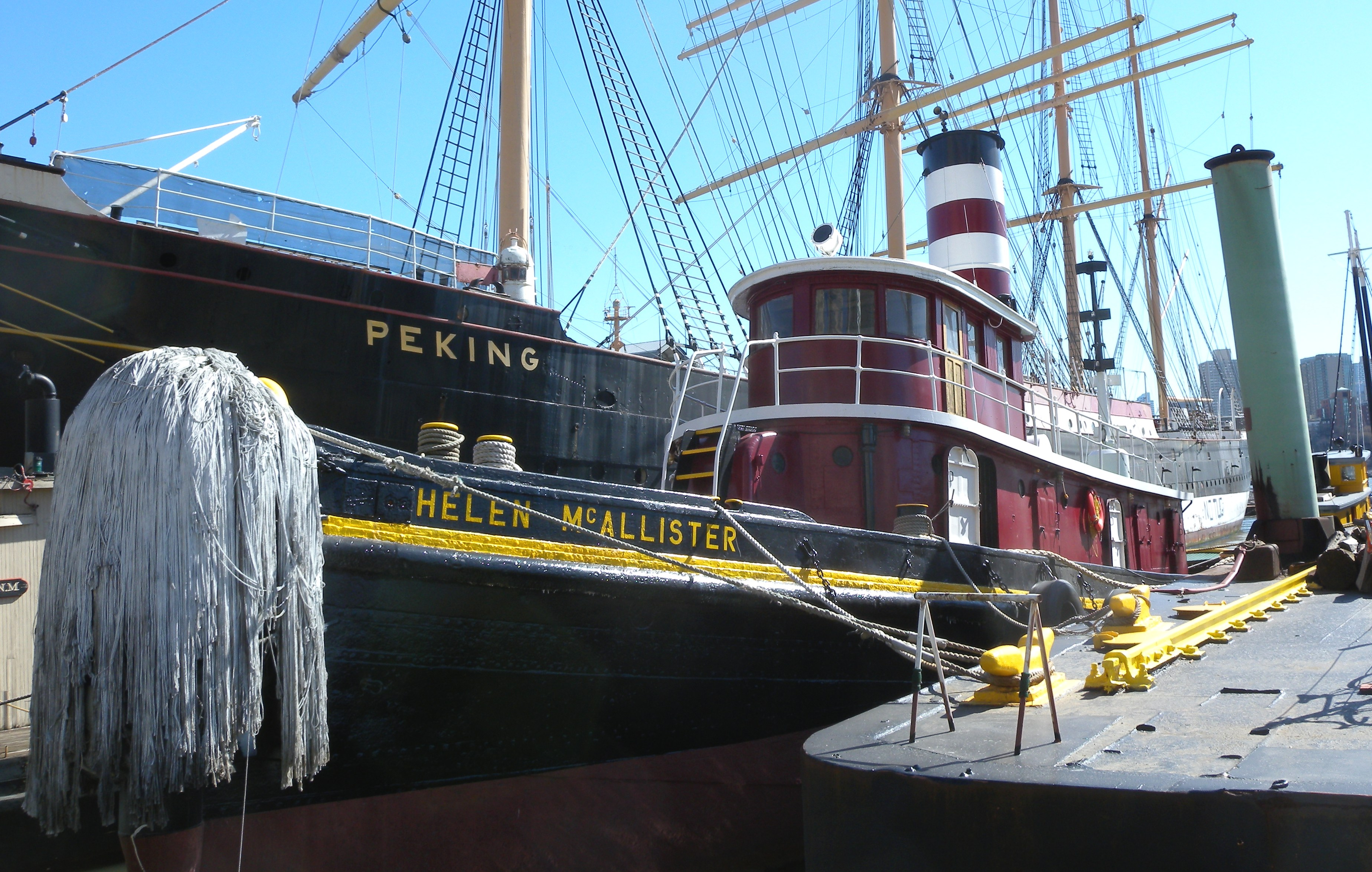

History

United States
- Port of registry: (United States) Charleston, SC
- Builder: New York Burlee Drydock Co.
- Launched: 1900
- In service: 1900
- Out of service: 1992
- Fate: Dismantled at Staten Island, New York in 2021

General characteristics
- Type: Tugboat
- Displacement: 152 tons
- Length: 95.7 ft (29.2 m)
- Beam: 21 ft (6.4 m)
- Propulsion: diesel engine, one propeller
- Admiral Dewey
- U.S. National Register of Historic Places
- New York State Register of Historic Places
- Location: New York, New York
- Built: 1900
- Architect: Burlee Drydock Co.
- Architectural style: Harbor tugboat
- NRHP reference No.: 02001619
- NYSRHP No.: 06101.012677

Significant dates
- Added to NRHP: December 27, 2002
- Designated NYSRHP: August 21, 2002

Admiral Dewey, also known as Georgetown and today as Helen McAllister, is a 113 feet (34 m) tugboat built in 1900 at the Burlee Drydock in Port Richmond, New York. She was built with a 900 horsepower (670 kW) triple expansion compound steam engine which was replaced with a diesel engine after World War II. She towed coal barges to refuel ships in the harbor. In 1955, she was sold to a Charleston, South Carolina tugboat company. In the 1980s, the McAllister tugboat company of New York purchased the company and brought the renamed Helen McAllister back to New York Harbor. She helped dock tall ships during Op Sail 1992.

After retirement, she was donated to the South Street Seaport Museum in Manhattan in 2000. In 2012, Helen McAllister was returned to McAllister Towing. In 2021, Helen McAllister was moved to Tottenville on Staten Island and dismantled.
