= USS Dauphin =

1944 Windsor-class attack transport

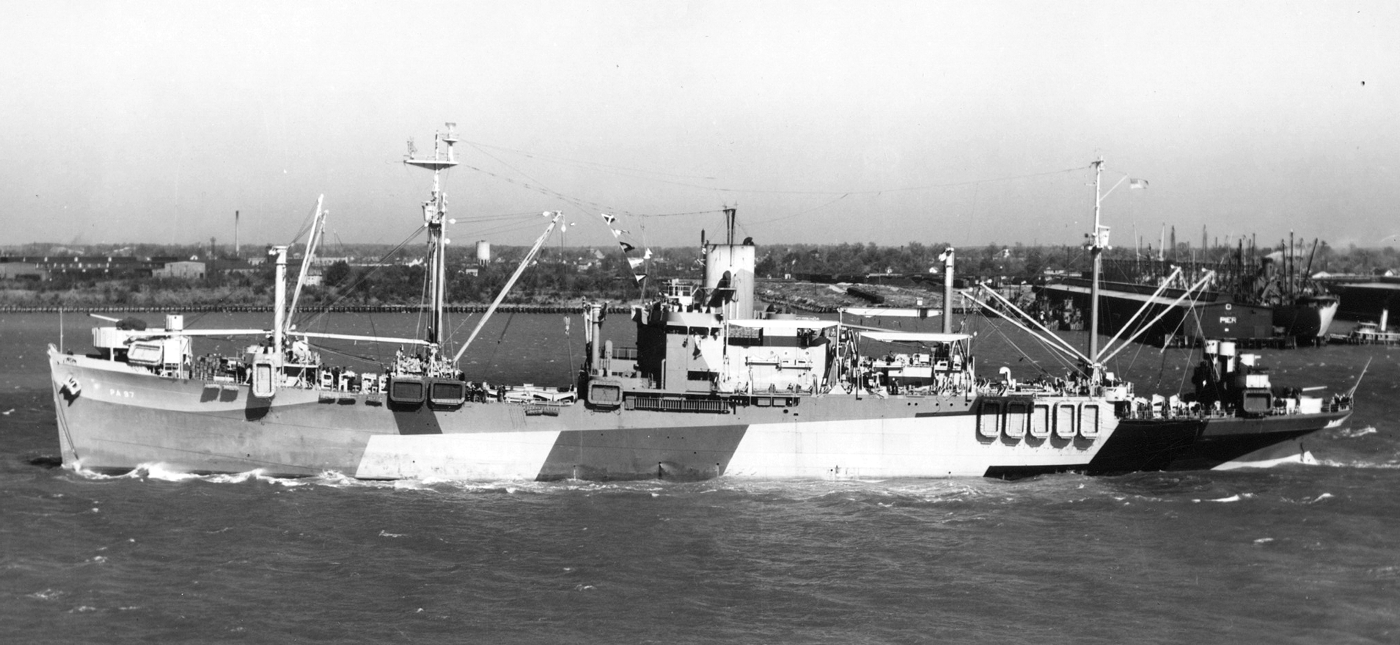

History

United States
- Name: USS Dauphin (APA-97)
- Namesake: Dauphin County, Pennsylvania
- Builder: Bethlehem Steel
- Launched: 10 June 1944
- Sponsored by: Miss B. Conway
- Acquired: 23 September 1944
- Commissioned: 23 September 1944
- Decommissioned: 30 April 1946
- Honours and awards: One battle star for World War II service
- Fate: Scrapped, 1979 as SS Stevens

General characteristics
- Class & type: Windsor-class attack transport
- Displacement: 7,970 tons (lt), 13,132 t. (fl)
- Length: 473 ft 1 in (144.20 m)
- Beam: 66 ft (20 m)
- Draft: 26 ft (7.9 m)
- Propulsion: Bethlehem geared turbine drive, 2 × Babcock & Wilcox header-type boilers, single propeller, designed shaft horsepower 8,000
- Speed: 18.6 knots (34.4 km/h)
- Capacity: Troops: Officer 91 Enlisted 1,420; Cargo: 150,000 cu ft (4,200 m^{3}), 1,600 tons
- Complement: Officer 54 Enlisted 498
- Armament: 1 x 5"/38 caliber dual-purpose gun mounts, 2 x Bofors 40 mm L/60 gun mounts, 2 x twin 20mm gun mounts, 18 x single 20 mm gun mounts
- Notes: MCV Hull No. 1675, hull type C3-S-A3

USS Dauphin (APA-97) was a Windsor-class attack transport that served with the United States Navy from 1944 to 1946. She was sold into commercial service in 1948 and was scrapped in 1979.

== History ==
Dauphin (APA-97) was named after Dauphin County, Pennsylvania. Dauphin (APA-97) was launched 10 June 1944 by Bethlehem Sparrows Point Shipyard, Sparrows Point, Maryland, under a Maritime Commission contract; transferred to the Navy 23 September 1944; and commissioned the same day.

=== Pacific War ===
Dauphin reported to Newport, Rhode Island 29 October 1944 for duty training precommissioning crews of transport and cargo ships, so serving 36 ships. Clearing Newport 20 January 1945 she arrived at Norfolk, Virginia the next day to load cargo, and on 13 February got underway for the Pacific.

She embarked troops and combat cargo at Pearl Harbor between 5 and 29 March, and arrived at Ulithi staging point for the Okinawa operation 15 April. She sailed from Ulithi on the 22d to land reinforcements at Hagushi Beach, Okinawa, from 26 to 30 April. Carrying casualties, she called at Saipan and arrived at San Francisco 22 May.

A week later Dauphin was underway for the Philippines. From 27 June until the end of the war she carried troops from New Guinea to the Philippines.

=== Operation Magic Carpet ===
On 26 August, Dauphin sailed from Batangas Bay, Luzon, with occupation troops. She anchored in Tokyo Bay the day of surrender, 2 September, and from 4 September to 27 October made four similar voyages carrying troops from the Philippines to Japan. Assigned to the Operation Magic Carpet fleet she made two voyages carrying home veterans from Sasebo, Japan, and San Pedro Bay, Leyte, between 6 November 1945 and 17 January 1946.

=== Decommissioning and fate ===
On the last day of January she put out for the east coast, arriving at Norfolk 17 February. Dauphin was decommissioned there 3 April 1946 and delivered to the War Shipping Administration the next day for disposal. Dauphin was sold for commercial service in 1948, being refurbished as passenger-cargo ship SS Exochorda, and later becoming SS Stevens, a floating dormitory for Stevens Institute of Technology. She was scrapped in 1979.

== Awards ==
Dauphin earned one battle star for World War II service.
