= List of Liberty ships (N) =

This is a List of Liberty ships with names beginning with N.

== Description ==
The standard Liberty ship (EC-2-S-C1 type) was a cargo ship 441 feet 6 inches (134.57 m) long overall, with a beam of 56 feet 10 3/4 inches (17.34 m). It had a depth of 37 feet 4 inches (11.38 m) and a draft of 26 feet 10 inches (8.18 m). It was powered by a triple expansion steam engine, which had cylinders of 24 1/2 inches (62 cm), 37 inches (94 cm) and 70 inches (180 cm) diameter by 48 inches (120 cm) stroke. The engine produced 2,500ihp at 76rpm. Driving a four-blade propeller 18 feet 6 inches (5.64 m) in diameter, could propel the ship at 11 knots (20 km/h).

Cargo was carried in five holds, numbered 1–5 from bow to stern. Grain capacity was 84,183 cubic feet (2,383.8 m^{3}), 145,604 cubic feet (4,123.0 m^{3}), 96,429 cubic feet (2,730.6 m^{3}), 93,190 cubic feet (2,639 m^{3}) and 93,190 cubic feet (2,639 m^{3}), with a further 49,086 cubic feet (1,390.0 m^{3}) in the deep tanks. Bale capacity was 75,405 cubic feet (2,135.2 m^{3}), 134,638 cubic feet (3,812.5 m^{3}), 83,697 cubic feet (2,370.0 m^{3}), 82,263 cubic feet (2,329.4 m^{3}) and 82,435 cubic feet (2,334.3 m^{3}), with a further 41,135 cubic feet (1,164.8 m^{3}) in the deep tanks.

It carried a crew of 45, plus 36 United States Navy Armed Guard gunners. Later in the war, this was altered to a crew of 52, plus 29 gunners. Accommodation was in a three deck superstructure placed midships. The galley was equipped with a range, a 25 US gallons (95 L) stock kettle and other appliances. Messrooms were equipped with an electric hot plate and an electric toaster.

== Nachman Syrkin ==
Nachman Syrkin was built by Delta Shipbuilding Company, New Orleans, Louisiana. Her keel was laid on 13 November 1944. She was launched on 23 December and delivered on 13 January 1945. Built for the War Shipping Administration (WSA), she was operated under the management of Norton Lilly Management Co. Management transferred to W. J. Rountree & Co. in 1946. Laid up at Astoria, Oregon in 1949. Sold in 1951 to Universal Cargo Carriers Corp. and renamed Seamystery. Operated under the management of Orion Shipping & Trading Co. Sold in 1953 to San Bernando Compania Navigation and renamed Katina. Reflagged to Panama, remaining under the same management. Sold in 1959 to Fiadora Compania Navigation and renamed Theomana. Operated under the management of Spiros Polemis Sons. She was scrapped at Hong Kong in March 1967.

== Nakhoda ==
Nakhoda was built by Oregon Shipbuilding Corporation, Portland, Oregon. Her keel was laid on 1 June 1943. She was launched as Irving W. Pratt on 21 June and delivered as Nakhoda on 29 June. To the Soviet Union. She was scrapped in the Soviet Union in 1968.

== Nancy Hanks ==
Nancy Hanks was built by Permanente Metals Corporation, Richmond, California. Her keel was laid on 21 December 1942. She was scrapped at Baltimore, Maryland in 1958.

== Napoleon B. Broward ==
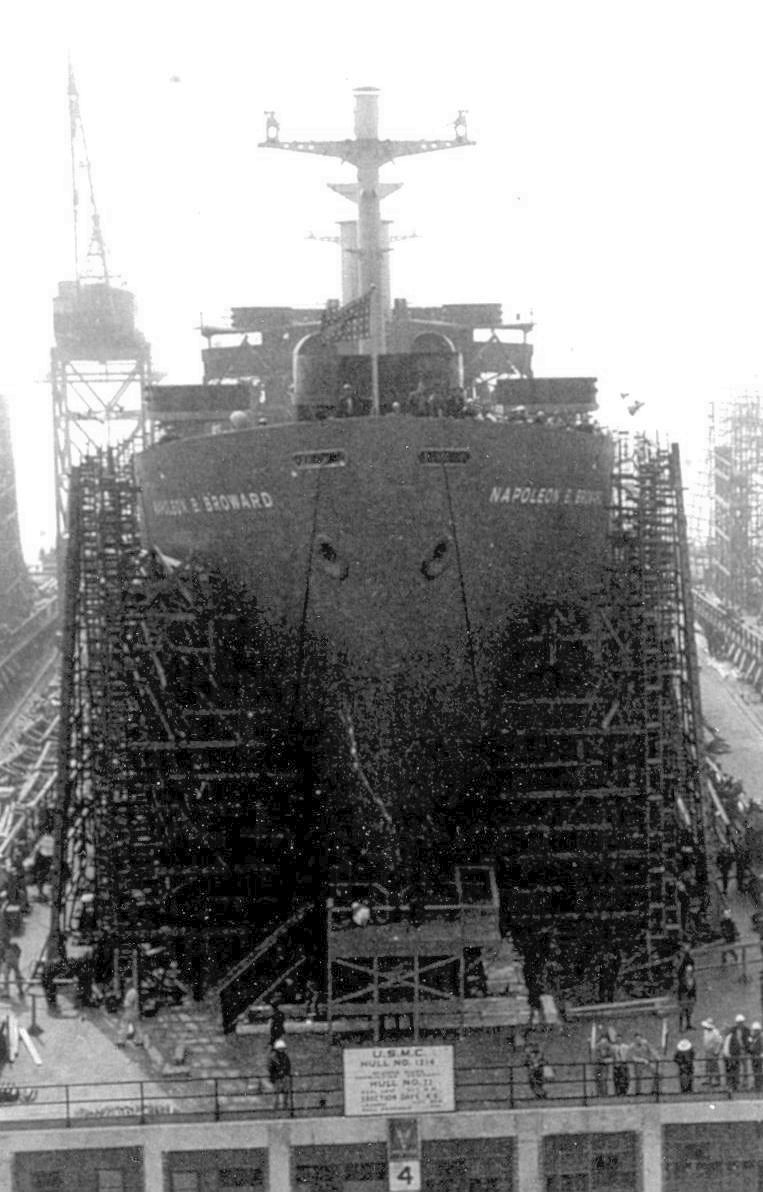
Napoleon B. Broward

Napoleon B. Broward was built by St. Johns River Shipbuilding Company, Jacksonville, Florida. Her keel was laid on 16 October 1943. She was launched on 30 November and delivered on 10 December. To the United States Navy and renamed Matar. Converted for naval service by Merrill-Stevens Drydock & Repair Co., Jacksonville. Laid up in reserve at Pearl Harbor, Hawaii in March 1946. Returned to United States Maritime Commission (USMC) in October 1947. Laid up in Suisun Bay. She was scrapped at Richmond in March 1972.

== Narcissa Whitman ==
Narcissa Whitman was built by Oregon Shipbuilding Corporation. Her keel was laid on 3 December 1943. She was launched on 18 December and delivered on 4 January 1944. She was scrapped at Portland, Oregon in 1961.

== Nathanael Greene ==
Nathanael Greene was built by North Carolina Shipbuilding Company, Wilmington, North Carolina. Her keel was laid on 22 May 1941. She was launched on 17 January 1942 and delivered on 12 March. Built for the WSA, she as operated under the management of United States Lines Inc. She was torpedoed and damaged in the Mediterranean Sea 40 nautical miles (74 km) off Oran, Algeria by U-565 on 24 February 1942 whilst on a voyage from Monastagem to Algiers. She was then torpedoed again by an aircraft. Towed in to Salamanca, Algeria and beached, she was declared a total loss.

== Nathan B. Forrest ==
Nathan B. Forrest was a tank transport built by J. A. Jones Construction Company, Panama City, Florida. Her keel was laid on 2 October 1943. She was launched on 13 November and delivered on 29 December. Laid up in the James River post-war. She was sold to Dutch buyers in July 1971. Resold, she was scrapped at Burriana, Spain in January 1973.

== Nathan Clifford ==
Nathan Clifford was built by Bethlehem Fairfield Shipyard, Baltimore, Maryland. Her keel was laid on 1 January 1943. She was launched on 18 February and delivered on 3 March. Built for the WSA, she was operated under the management of American Foreign Steamship Corporation, New York. Sold to her managers in 1947 and renamed American Oriole. Sold in 1957 to Atlantic Oriole Steamship Co. and renamed Atlantic Oriole. Reflagged to Libera, operated under the management of her former owner. Sold in 1961 to Marsuerte Compania Navigation S.A., Panama and renamed Kyma. Remaining under the Liberian flag, operated under the management of Maritime Messengers Co. Management transferred to Adamanthos Shipping Agency in 1964. Renamed Tassia in 1965 and reflagged to Greece. Sold later that year to A. A. Catsogeorgis, Piraeus, Greece. She sprang a leak and sank 680 nautical miles (1,260 km) south east of Cape Race, Canada (36°36′N 51°24′W) on 9 May 1965 whilst on a voyage from Antwerp, Belgium to Houston, Texas, United States.

== Nathan Hale ==
Nathan Hale was built by California Shipbuilding Corporation, Terminal Island, Los Angeles, California. Her keel was laid on 29 September 1941. She was launched on 4 February 1942 and delivered on 7 May. She struck a mine 5 nautical miles (9.3 km) west of Gorgona, Italy on 5 February 1946. She put in to Livorno and was subsequently laid up at Genoa. Declared a constructive total loss, she was scrapped at Savona, Italy in April 1949.

== Nathaniel Alexander ==
Nathaniel Alexander was built by North Carolina Shipbuilding Company. Her keel was laid on 2 August 1942. She was launched on 4 October and delivered on 18 October. Built for the WSA, she was operated under the management of Merchants and Miners Transportation Company. Sold in August 1947 to Skibs A/S Senita, Oslo, Norway and renamed Solfa. Operated under the management of H. Rich. Sold in 1948 to Alfred I. Thommessen, Oslo. Sold in 1949 to Einar Rasmussen and Alfred I. Thommessen, Oslo. Sold in May 1950 to Rederi A/S Norse Lady, Oslo and renamed Norse Lady. Operated under the management of Odd Godager. Sold in 1953 to Dann's Skibs A/S, Skibs A/S Sjofna and D/S A/S Vivi, Oslo. Operated under the management of C. Dann. Renamed Danio in 1954. Sold in 1962 to Compania Santa Marigo, Panama and renamed Troyan. Reflagged to Lebanon and operated under the management of John D. Papadimitrou. She arrived at Colombo, Ceylon in a leaky condition on 1 August 1967 whilst on a voyage from Kosseir, Egypt to Whampoa Dock, Hong Kong. She later resumed her voyage, but was sold for scrapping in October 1967. She arrived at Singapore for scrapping on 29 October, and was scrapped there in March 1968.

== Nathaniel Bacon ==
Nathaniel Bacon was built by Alabama Drydock Company, Mobile, Alabama. She was completed in October 1942. Built for the WSA, she was operated under the management of International Freighting Corp. She collided with the American tanker Esso Belgium at New York on 24 November 1942 and sank. Nathaniel Bacon was refloated, repaired and returned to service. She struck mines and caught fire off Civitavecchia, Italy on 19 December 1945. She was beached on 22 December and declared a constructive total loss. The bow section was scrapped in situ in 1946. Her stern section was sold for scrap. It was resold in 1950 and towed to Genoa. In 1951, it was joined to the bow section of Bert Williams to form a new ship, named Boccadasse.

== Nathaniel Bowditch ==
Nathaniel Bowditch was built by Permanente Metals Corporation. Her keel was laid on 3 October 1942. She was launched on 10 November and delivered on 23 November. She was scrapped at Oakland, California in January 1960.

== Nathaniel B. Palmer ==
Nathaniel B. Palmer was a tanker built by California Shipbuilding Corporation. She was completed in November 1943. To the United States Navy and renamed Caribou. Returned to WSA in May 1946 and renamed Nathaniel B. Palmer. Sold in 1948 to Palmer Shipping Corp., Wilmington, Delaware. Converted to a cargo ship at Newport News, Virginia in 1949. Now 7,210 GRT. She ran aground in the Martín García Channel on 31 May 1952 whilst on a voyage from Constitución, Argentina to Montevideo, Uruguay. She was refloated on 2 November. Although declared a constructive total loss, she was sold in 1953 to Olmeda Compania Navigation, Panama, repaired and renamed Manolito. She was reflagged to Costa Rica and operated under the management of Marcou & Sons. Sold in 1960 to Pavia Compania Navigation and renamed Manegina. Reflagged to Lebanon, remaining under the same management. She was scrapped at Savona in November 1962.

== Nathaniel Crosby ==
Nathaniel Crosby was built by Oregon Shipbuilding Corporation. Her keel was laid on 19 August 1943. She was launched on 5 September and delivered on 12 September. She was scrapped at Portland, Oregon in June 1970.

== Nathaniel Currier ==
Nathaniel Currier was built by Permanente Metals Corporation. Her keel was laid on 10 February 1943. She was launched on 11 March and delivered on 24 March. Laid up at Mobile post-war, she was scrapped at Panama City, Florida in December 1971.

== Nathaniel Hawthorne ==
Nathaniel Hawthorne was built by Oregon Shipbuilding Corporation. Her keel was laid on 5 February 1942. She was launched on 31 March and delivered on 2 May. Built for the WSA, she was operated under the management of Pacific Atlantic Steamship Co. She was torpedoed and sunk in the Caribbean Sea off Trinidad (11°34′N 63°26′W) by U-508 on 7 November 1942 whilst on a voyage from Paramaribo, Suriname to New York.

== Nathaniel J. Wyeth ==
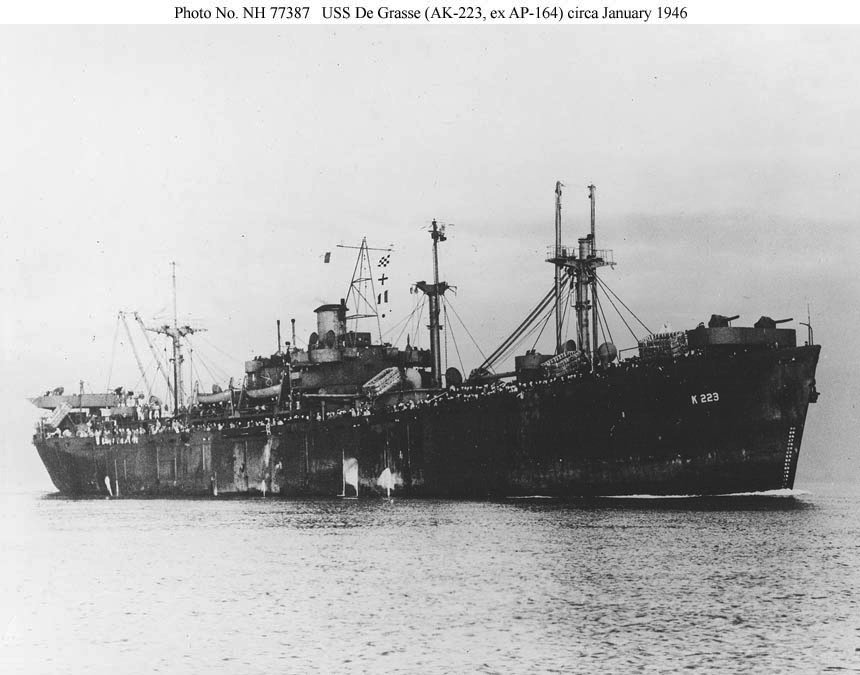
USS De Grasse

Nathaniel J. Wyeth was built by Oregon Shipbuilding Corporation. Her keel was laid on 31 January 1943. She was launched on 24 February and delivered on 6 March. To the United States Navy in October 1943 and renamed De Grasse. Converted for naval use by United Engineering Co., Alameda, California. Returned to the WSA in March 1946 and laid up in Suisun Bay. She was scrapped at Oakland in June 1970.

== Nathaniel Macon ==
Nathaniel Macon was built by North Carolina Shipbuilding Company. Her keel was laid on 13 December 1942. She was launched on 17 January 1943 and delivered on 26 January. Built for the WSA, she was operated under the management of A. H. Bull & Co., New York. Sold in 1947 to Evgenia J. Chandris, Piraeus and renamed Evgenia Chandris. She ran aground off the Aleutian Islands, Alaska, United States (51°15′N 179°07′W) on 17 August 1952 whilst on a voyage from Moji, Japan to Victoria, British Columbia, Canada. She was refloated and completed her voyage. Although declared a constructive total loss, she was sold in 1953 to Seatankers Inc., Monrovia, Liberia and renamed William V. S. Tubman. She was lengthened at Kure in 1954. Now 511 feet 6 inches (155.91 m) long and 8,582 GRT. Sold in 1959 to Penn Marine Co. Inc. and renamed Penn Vanguard. Reflagged to the United States and operated under the management of Penn Shipping Co. She was scrapped at Kaohsiung, Taiwan in November 1969.

== Nathaniel Scudder ==
Nathaniel Scudder was built by Todd Houston Shipbuilding Corporation, Houston, Texas. Her keel was laid on 12 May 1944. She was launched on 15 June and delivered on 26 June. Renamed Alfred J. Lyon in 1944, then Brigadier General Alfred J. Lyon later that year. To the United States Army, used as an aircraft repair ship. She was converted to a depot ship at Portland, Oregon in 1964.

== Nathaniel Silsbee ==
Nathaniel Silsbee was built by Todd Houston Shipbuilding Corporation. Her keel was laid on 18 May 1944. She was launched on 23 June and delivered on 30 June. Laid up at Beaumont, Texas post-war, she was scrapped at Brownsville, Texas in June 1972.

== Nathan S. Davis ==
Nathan S. Davis was built by Permanente Metals Corporation. Her keel was laid on 8 January 1944. She was launched on 27 January and delivered on 5 February. Built for the WSA, she was operated under the management of United States Lines. Sold in 1947 to Società Anonyme Italiana di Navigazione Mercantile, Genoa and renamed Giacomo Fassio. She was scrapped at La Spezia, Italy in 1962.

== Nathan Towson ==
Nathan Towson was built by Bethlehem Fairfield Shipyard. Her keel was laid on 28 May 1943. She was launched on 28 June and delivered on 8 July. Laid up in the James River post war. She was sold to shipbreakers in Portsmouth, Virginia in September 1972, but was scrapped at Brownsville in January 1974.

== Navarchos Koundouriotis ==
Navarchos Koundouriotis was built by Todd Houston Shipbuilding Corporation. Her keel was laid on 14 October 1944. She was launched as Cyril G. Hopkin on 18 November and delivered as Navarchos Koundouriotis on 28 November. Built for John S. Carras, Chios, Greece. Sold in 1962 to Cardamyla Marine Enterprises. Operated under the management of A. Lusi Ltd. Ran aground at Mar del Plata, Argentina on 20 October 1964 whilst on a voyage from Mar del Plata to Marseille, France. She broke in two and was declared a constructive total loss. Both sections later refloated and scrapped locally.

== Negley D. Cochran ==
Negley D. Cochran was built by St. Johns River Shipbuilding Company. Her keel was laid on 19 July 1944. She was launched on 29 August and delivered on 10 September. Built for the WSA, she was operated under the management of Smith & Johnson. Management transferred to States Marine Corp. in 1946. Sold in February 1947 to Global Transport Ltd. and renamed Global Trader. Reflagged to Panama, operated under the management of States Marine Corp. Sold later that year to Norge av Skibs A/S, Akershus, Norway and renamed Surna. Operated under the management of Gørrisen & Co. A/S. Transferred to Gørrisen & Klaveness A/S, Oslo in 1949. Transferred to Torvald Klaveness Rederi A/S, Oslo in 1958. Sold in 1959 to Namdal Shipping & Trading, Monrovia and renamed Maringa. Operated under the management of Carl Aune & Co. Cia. Lda. Sold in 1960 to Comania Navicion E. Comerico Pan-Americana, Rio de Janeiro, Brazil. She sank off the coast of Brazil (11°30′S 37°15′W) on 16 June 1969 whilst on a voyage from Areia Branca to Santos.

== Newton D. Baker ==
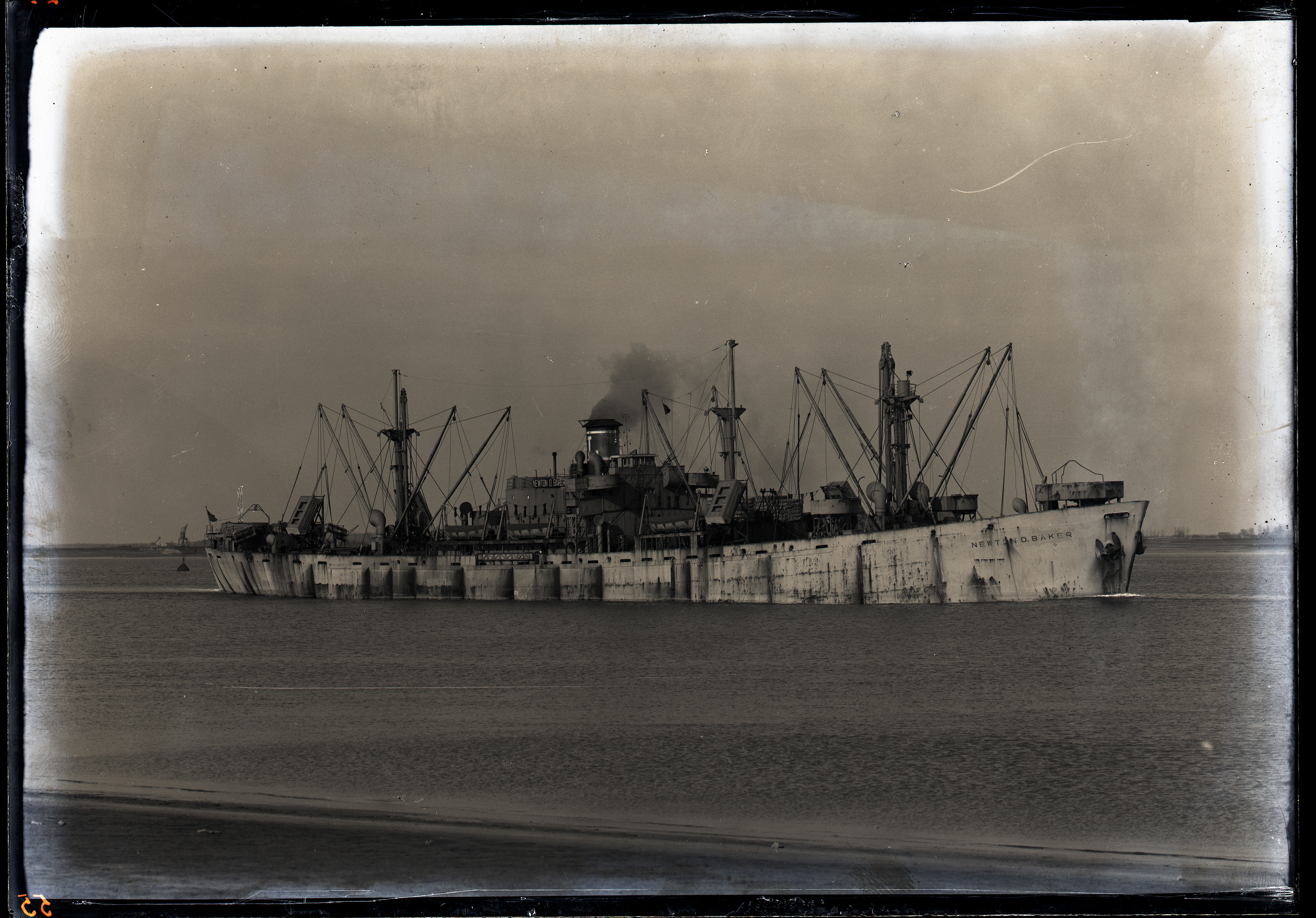
Newton D. Baker

Nelson D. Baker was built by J. A. Jones Construction Company, Panama City. Her keel was laid on 3 September 1942. She was launched on 25 February 1943 and delivered on 6 April. he was scrapped at Panama City in November 1968.

== Nelson Dingley ==
Nelson Dingley was built by New England Shipbuilding Corporation, South Portland, Maine. Her keel was laid on 10 June 1943. She was launched on 20 July and delivered on 29 July. Built for the WSA, she was operated under the management of States Marine Corp. Sold in 1947 to Società Commerciale di Navigazione, Genoa and renamed Italterra. Fitted with a FIAT diesel engine at Taranto in 1953. Sold in 1965 to Lloyd's Africa Ltd. and renamed Bayport. Reflagged to Liberia and operated under the management of Transamerican Steamship Corp. She was scrapped at Santander, Spain in July 1972.

== Nelson W. Aldrich ==
Nelson W. Aldrich was built by Walsh-Kaiser Company, Providence, Rhode Island. Her keel was laid on 18 November 1943. She was launched on 2 April and delivered on 30 April. She was scrapped at Kearny in November 1968.

== Nicholas Biddle ==
Nicholas Biddle was built by Bethlehem Fairfield Shipyard. Her keel was laid on 11 August 1942. She was launched on 22 September and delivered on 30 September. She was scrapped at Beaumont in 1963.

== Nicholas D. Labadie ==
Nicholas D. Labadie was built by Todd Houston Shipbuilding Corporation. Her keel was laid on 31 March 1944. She was launched on 11 May and delivered on 23 May. She was scrapped at Mobile in May 1962.

== Nicholas Gilman ==
Nicholas Gilman was built by Todd Houston Shipbuilding Corporation. Her keel was laid on 4 May 1942. She was launched on 25 July and delivered on 19 August. She was scrapped at Philadelphia, Pennsylvania in 1963.

== Nicholas Hermiker ==
Nicholas Hermiker was built by Southeastern Shipbuilding Corporation, Savannah, Georgia. Her keel was laid on 8 April 1943. She was launched on 8 June and delivered on 5 July. She was scrapped at Green Cove Springs, Florida in September 1967.

== Nicholas J. Sinnot ==
Nicholas J. Sinnot was built by Oregon Shipbuilding Corporation. Her keel was laid on 3 June 1943. She was launched on 23 June and delivered on 30 June. Built for the WSA, she was operated under the management of James Griffiths & Sons. To the United States War Department in 1946. To the Chinese Government later that year under Lend-Lease and renamed Hai Chiao Sold in 1947 to China Merchants Steam Navigation Co. Reflagged to Taiwan in 1965. She was scrapped at Kaohsiung in August 1966.

== Nicholas Longworth ==
Nicholas Longworth was a tanker built by California Shipbuilding Corporation. Laid down as Nicholas Longworth, she was launched as Ibex and completed in December 1943. To the United States Navy. Returned to the WSA in June 1946 and renamed Nicholas Longworth. Sold in 1948 to T. J. Stevenson & Co., New York and renamed Helen Stevenson. Converted to a cargo ship at Norfolk, Virginia in 1949. Now 7,129 GRT. She developed cracks in her deck on 13 February 1952 when 230 nautical miles (430 km) north west of Bermuda. She was on a voyage from Trieste, Italy to New York. Monitored by a United States Coast Guard aircraft, she put in to Bermuda assisted by USCGC Dexter. Sold in 1957 to Elderfields Steamship Co. and renamed Elderfields. Reflagged to Liberia and operated under the management of Ocean Freighting & Brokerage Corp. Sold in 1961 to Marine Development & Supply S.A., Panama and renamed Winner. Operated under the management of Marine Industry Corp. She ran aground in a typhoon at Wakamoura, Japan on 10 September 1965. Refloated on 25 September and drydocked at Hitachi. Subsequently towed to Osaka. Declared a constructive total loss, she was scrapped at Hirao in February 1966.

== Nick Stoner ==
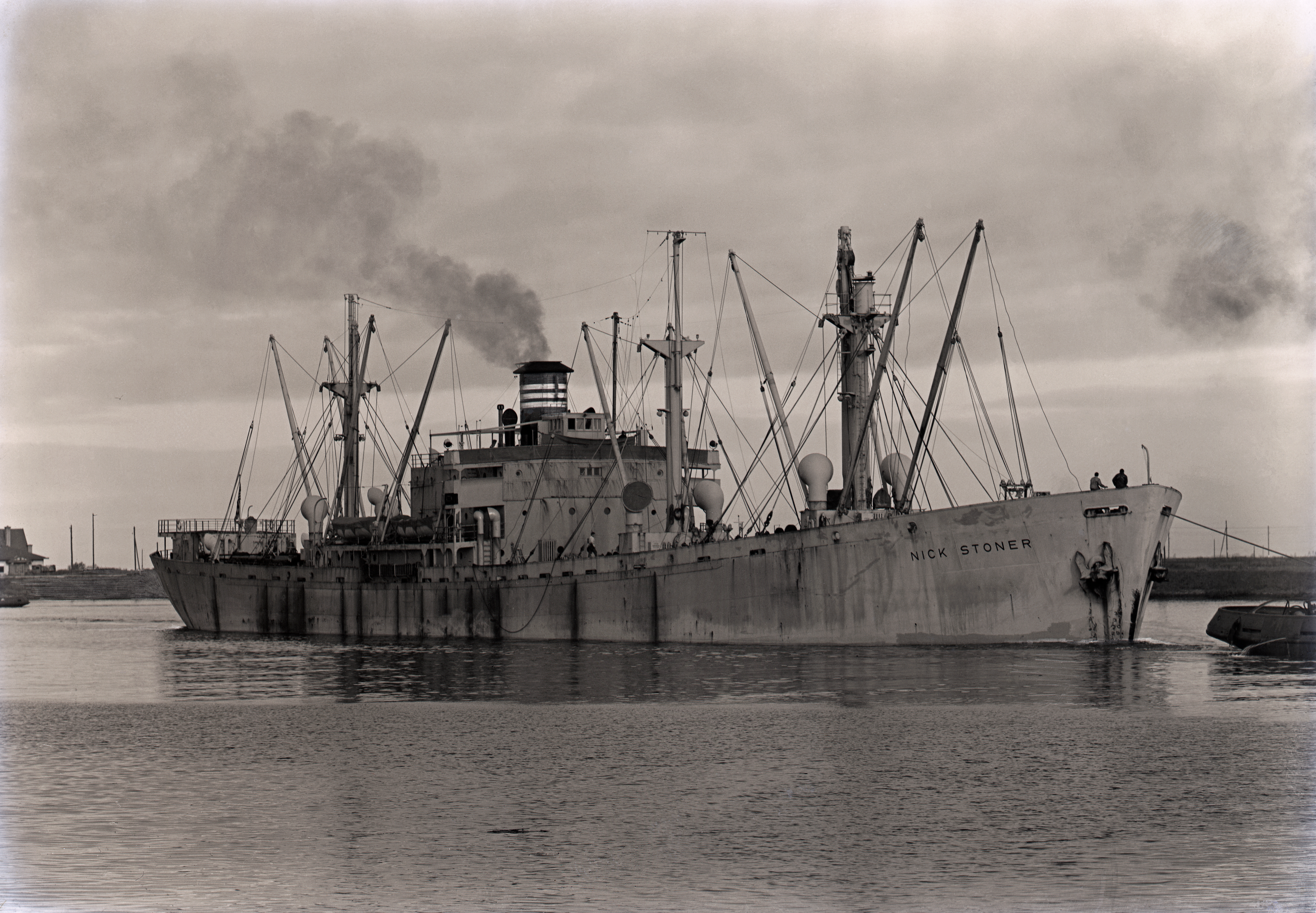
Nick Stoner

Nick Stoner was built by J. A. Jones Construction Company, Panama City. Her keel was laid on 12 May 1944. She was launched on 17 June and delivered on 30 June. She was scrapped at Panama City in July 1964.

== Niels Poulson ==
Niels Poulson was built by J. A. Jones Construction Company, Brunswick. Her keel was laod on 18 August 1944. She was launched on 18 August and delivered on 5 September. Built for the WSA, she was operated under the management of Dichmann, Wright & Pugh. She struck a mine off Gorgona, Italy on 14 September 1946 whilst on a voyage from Baltimore to Livorno. She was towed in to Livorno and beached. Declared a constructive total loss, she was scrapped at Genoa in November 1948.

== Nikola Tesla ==
Nikola Tesla was built by Bethlehem Fairfield Shipyard. Her keel was laid on 31 August 1943. She was launched as Nikola Tesla on 25 September and delivered as Samkansa on 4 October. To the United Kingdom under Lend-Lease. Operated under the management of Orient Steam Navigation Company. Sold in 1947 to Hadley Shipping Co. and renamed Cerinthus. Operated under the management of Houlder Bros. & Co. Sold in 1952 to Rio Amado Compania Navigation, Panama and renamed Phassa. Operated under the management of Capeside Steamship Co. Sold in 1953 to Compania de Navigation Cerro La Plata and renamed Urania. Operated under the management of Coulouthros Ltd. Management transferred to Syros Shipping Co. in 1960. Sold in 1964 to Evergreen Navigation Corp. and renamed Concord Venture. Operated under the management of Wah Kwong & Co. She was scrapped at Sakaide, Japan in January 1970.

== Noah Brown ==
Noah Brown

Noah Brown was built by St. Johns River Shipbuilding Company. Her keel was laid on 28 April 1944. She was launched on 8 June and delivered on 28 June. Built for the WSA, she was operated under the management of Seas Shipping Co. On 8 August 1945, she rescued 27 of the 40 crew of the British cargo ship Argos Hill, which had caught fire 385 nautical miles (713 km) off Halifax, Canada. The rest of the crew of Argos Hill were rescued by the Victory ship Montclair Victory. Management transferred to T. J. Stevenson & Co. in 1946. Sold in 1947 to Bulk Carriers Corp., New York. Renamed Henry Stevenson in 1949. Sold in 1955 to Aldershot Steamship Corp. and renamed Aldershot. Reflagged to Liberia and operated under the management of Ocean Freighting & Brokerage Corp. Sold in 1960 to Regina Steamship Corp. and renamed Karolina. Reflagged to Greece, remaining under the same management. Sold in 1963 to Adriatic Maritime Co. and renamed Vrontados Pioneer. Reflagged to Liberia and operated under the management of Pacific Steamship Agency. Sold in 1966 to Cosmic Freighters Ltd. She was scrapped at Gandia, Spain in January 1969.

== Noah H. Swayne ==
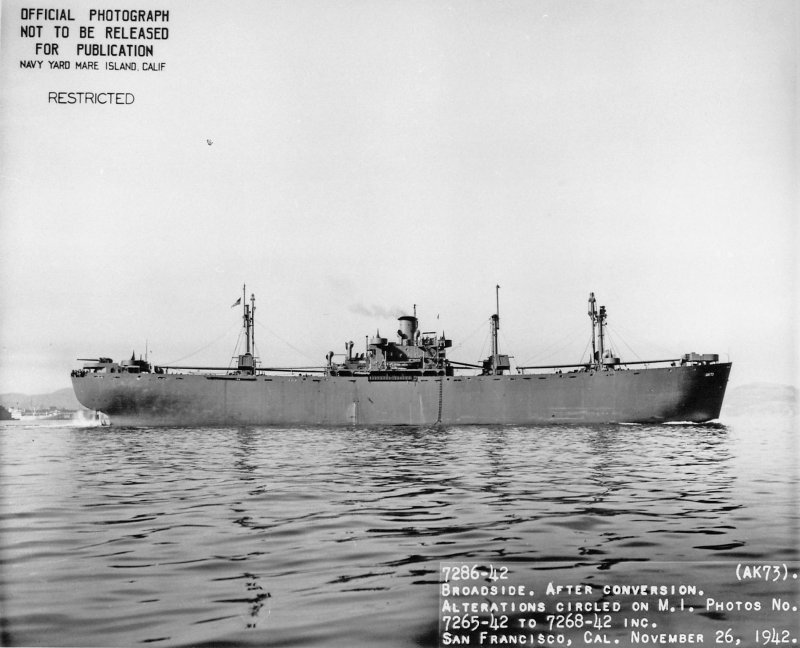
USS Arided

Noah H. Swayne was built by Permanente Metals Corporation. Her keel was laid on 20 September 1942. She was launched as Noah H. Swayne on 28 October and completed as Arided on 12 November. To the United States Navy. Laid up in reserve in January 1946. Moved to Suisun Bay in October 1947. She was scrapped at Terminal Island in August 1962.

== Noah Webster ==
Noah Webster was built by New England Shipbuilding Corporation. Her keel was laid on 12 November 1942. She was launched on 31 January 1943 and delivered on 27 February. Laid up at Mobile post-war, she was scuttled off the coast of Alabama in 1976.

== Norman E. Mack ==
Norman E. Mack was built by Permanente Metals Corporation. Her keel was laid on 26 September 1943. She was launched on 16 October and delivered on 24 October. Laid up at Mobile post-war, she was scrapped at Panama City, Florida in January 1971.

== Norman Hapgood ==
Norman Hapgood was built by Permanente Metals Corporation. Her keel was laid on 24 September 1943. She was launched on 13 October and delivered on 21 October. Built for the WSA, she was operated under the management of Sudden & Christenson. Sold in 1947 to Società di Navigazione Italia, Genoa and renamed Nereide. Laid up at Trieste in 1972, she arrived at Vado di Ligure for scrapping in January 1973.

== Norman J. Colman ==
Norman J. Colman was built by Permanente Metals Corporation. Her keel was laid on 23 April 1944. She was launched on 13 May and delivered on 25 May. Laid up in the James River post-war, she was scrapped at Valencia, Spain in December 1971.

== Norman O. Pedrick ==
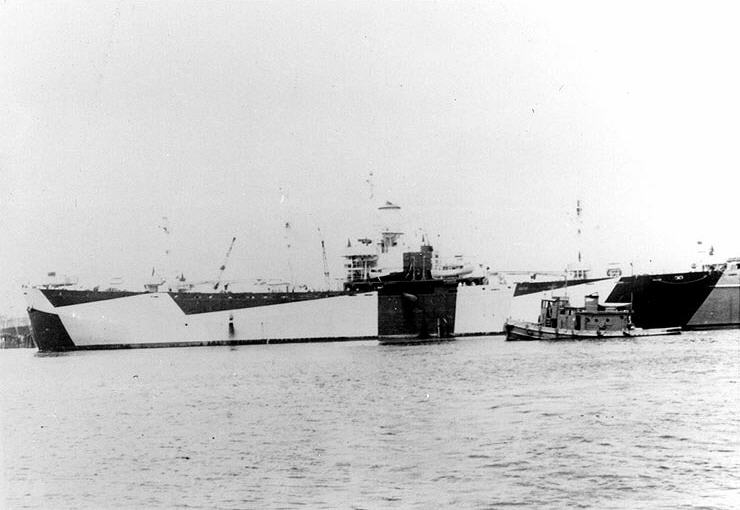
USS Stag

Norman O. Pedrick was a tanker built by Delta Shipbuilding Company. Her keel was laid on 13 November 1943. She was launched on 7 January 1944 and delivered on 16 February. To the United States Navy and renamed Stag. Converted to a water distilling ship by Tampa Shipbuilding Company, Tampa, Florida. To WSA in April 1946 and renamed Norman O. Pedrick. Laid up in the James River. She was scrapped at Burriana, Spain in October 1970.
