= Nicholas Biddle (disambiguation) =

Nicholas Biddle (1786–1844) was an American banker and President of the Second Bank of the United States.

Nicholas Biddle may also refer to:

- Nicholas Biddle (naval officer) (1750–1778), officer in the American Continental Navy
- Nicholas Biddle, a First Defender injured in the Baltimore riot of 1861
- SS Nicholas Biddle, a Liberty ship
