= SS Charles W. Stiles =

World War II Liberty ship of the United States

History

United States
- Name: Charles W. Stiles
- Namesake: Charles W. Stiles
- Ordered: as type (EC2-S-C1) hull, MC hull 2380
- Builder: J.A. Jones Construction, Brunswick, Georgia
- Cost: $919,945
- Yard number: 165
- Way number: 1
- Laid down: 9 September 1944
- Launched: 18 October 1944
- Sponsored by: Mrs. P.O. Murphy
- Completed: 31 October 1944
- Identification: Call Signal: KSZZ
- Fate: Sold for commercial use, 28 February 1947

Panama
- Name: Bygdin
- Namesake: Bygdin
- Owner: Global Transport Ltd.
- Acquired: 28 February 1947
- Fate: Scrapped, 1969

General characteristics
- Class & type: Liberty ship; type EC2-S-C1, standard
- Tonnage: 10,865 LT DWT; 7,176 GRT
- Displacement: 3,380 long tons (3,434 t) (light); 14,245 long tons (14,474 t) (max)
- Length: 441 feet 6 inches (135 m) oa; 416 feet (127 m) pp; 427 feet (130 m) lwl
- Beam: 57 feet (17 m)
- Draft: 27 ft 9.25 in (8.4646 m)
- Installed power: 2 × Oil fired 450 °F (232 °C) boilers, operating at 220 psi (1,500 kPa); 2,500 hp (1,900 kW)
- Propulsion: 1 × triple-expansion steam engine, (manufactured by General Machinery Corp., Hamilton, Ohio); 1 × screw propeller
- Speed: 11.5 knots (21.3 km/h; 13.2 mph)
- Capacity: 562,608 cubic feet (15,931 m^{3}) (grain); 499,573 cubic feet (14,146 m^{3}) (bale)
- Complement: 38–62 USMM; 21–40 USNAG
- Armament: Varied by ship; Bow-mounted 3-inch (76 mm)/50-caliber gun; Stern-mounted 4-inch (102 mm)/50-caliber gun; 2–8 × single 20-millimeter (0.79 in) Oerlikon anti-aircraft (AA) cannons and/or, 2–8 × 37-millimeter (1.46 in) M1 AA guns

SS Charles W. Stiles was a Liberty ship built in the United States during World War II. She was named after Charles W. Stiles, a parasitologist and zoologist at the Bureau of Animal Industry in the U.S. Department of Agriculture (1891–1902), who was later chief zoologist at the Hygienic Laboratory of the US Public Health and Marine Hospital Service (1902–1931).

== Construction ==
Charles W. Stiles was laid down on 9 September 1944, under a United States Maritime Commission (MARCOM) contract, MC hull 2380, by J.A. Jones Construction, Brunswick, Georgia; she was sponsored by Mrs. P.O. Murphy, and launched on 18 October 1944.

== History ==
She was allocated to Seas Shipping Co. Inc., on 31 October 1944. On 28 February 1947, she was sold for $562,260.11 to Global Transport Ltd., for commercial use. She was reflagged for Panama, and renamed Bygdin.

== Bibliography ==
- "Jones Construction, Brunswick GA". ShipbuildingHistory.com. 13 October 2010.
- "Liberty Ships – World War II".
- Maritime Administration. "Charles W. Stiles". Ship History Database Vessel Status Card. U.S. Department of Transportation, Maritime Administration. Archived from the original on 12 December 2019.
- Davies, James (May 2004). "Specifications (As-Built)" (PDF). p. 23.
- "SS Charles W. Stiles".
