= USS Alhena =

Cargo ship of the United States Navy

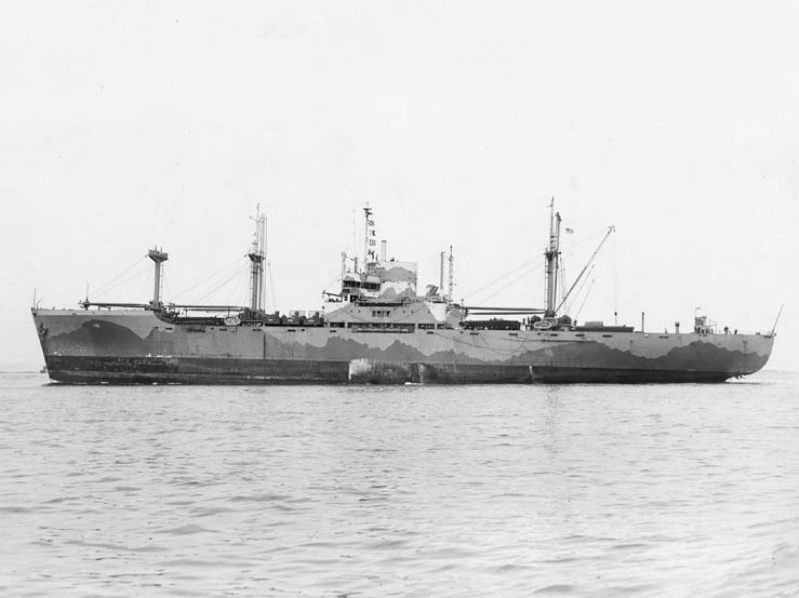
- USS Alhena (AKA-9)

History

United States
- Name: Robin Kettering (1941); Alhena (1941 – 1946); Robin Kettering (1946 – 1957); Flying Hawk (1957 – 1971)
- Namesake: Alhena, a star in the constellation Gemini
- Builder: Bethlehem Sparrows Point Shipyard, Maryland
- Laid down: 19 June 1940
- Launched: 18 January 1941
- Acquired: 31 May 1941
- Commissioned: 15 June 1941
- Decommissioned: 22 May 1946
- Reclassified: AKA-9, 26 November 1942
- Stricken: 15 August 1946
- Identification: Official number: 240632
- Honors and awards: 6 battle stars (World War II)
- Fate: Sold for scrapping 1971

General characteristics
- Type: Type C2 ship
- Tonnage: 7,101 GRT
- Displacement: 15,080 long tons (15,322 t)
- Length: 479 ft 8 in (146.20 m)
- Beam: 66 ft (20 m)
- Draft: 27 ft 1 in (8.26 m)
- Speed: 16.6 knots (30.7 km/h; 19.1 mph)
- Complement: 446
- Armament: 1 × 5"/38 caliber gun mount

USS Alhena (AKA-9) was an American attack cargo ship named after Alhena, a star in the constellation Gemini. Robin Kettering had been purchased from Robin Line of the Seas Shipping Company some four months after launch and served as a commissioned ship for five years and four months. On 12 September 1946 the ship was transferred to the War Shipping Administration and placed in reserve until repurchased by Seas Shipping for operation as Robin Kettering. In 1957 the ship was sold, renamed Flying Hawk operating in cargo—passenger service until sold for scrap in 1971.

== Construction ==
Robin Kettering was the third of three geared turbine, modified C2-S type ships for the Seas Shipping Company's Robin Line by the Bethlehem Shipbuilding Corporation at its Bethlehem Sparrows Point Shipyard, Maryland yard under a Maritime Commission contract. The ships had sequential MC and yard hull numbers: Robin Locksley 72/4341, (Note: According to the MARAD Vessel Status Card Robin Locksley was delivered to the War Shipping Administration 28 February 1942 and was operated under an Army Transportation Corps agreement by Seas Shipping Company until 31 May 1944 when the agreement was changed to a WSA general agreement. The ship was redelivered to the company 30 April 1946.) Robin Doncaster 73/4342, and Robin Kettering 74/4343. One of the modifications for these ships was increased length, approximately that of the C3 type, no bow or stern sheer and a flat, broad funnel. The last ship's keel was laid on 19 June 1940 with launch on 18 January 1941 sponsored by Mrs. William Sanford Lewis. The ship was delivered on 29 May 1941 and registered with official number 240632.

As built the ship was 7,101 GRT, 4,258 NRT, 479 feet 8 inches (146.20 m) length overall, 450 feet 0 inches (137.16 m) length between perpendiculars, 66 feet (20.12 m) beam with a depth of 34 feet 2 inches (10.41 m) and a draft of 27 feet (8.23 m). The ship had a bale capacity of 593,655 cubic feet (16,810.4 m^{3}), or a grain capacity of 659,215 cubic feet (18,666.9 m^{3}), as well as capacity for 11,530 cubic feet (326 m^{3}) of refrigerated cargo, and 3,485 cubic feet (98.7 m^{3}) special cargo space in five holds. Carrying 612 long tons (622 t) water and 2,012 long tons (2,044 t) coal, she had a range of 18,500 nautical miles (34,300 km). She had a crew of 43 and could carry twelve passengers. The ship had sixteen 5-ton derricks, one 10-ton derrick and one 30-ton derrick to allow loading and unloading of cargo.

Two steam turbines drove a single screw propeller of 20 feet 0 inches (6.10 m) diameter. The turbines were rated at 6,300 shp and driving the propeller at 85 rpm, they could propel her at a normal service speed of 15.5 knots (28.7 km/h), with a maximum speed of 18.17 knots (33.65 km/h).

== Naval service ==
On 31 May 1941 the ship was purchased by the Navy from the Robin Line of the Seas Shipping Co., Inc., of New York City; commissioned as Alhena (AK-26) at Hoboken, N.J., on 15 June 1941.

=== Service history ===
Following final fitting out and shakedown training, the cargo ship began operating among ports on the East Coast of the United States. The ship arrived at Boston on 13 December to take on cargo for NS Argentia, Newfoundland. She completed her run to that port by the end of December and then proceeded to Brooklyn, N.Y., to refill her holds.

==== Voyage to Europe ====
She picked up more cargo at Norfolk, Va., in mid-January 1942 and returned to New York City to embark troops before getting underway on 5 February for Europe. On the next day, the ship was officially assigned to the Naval Transportation Service.

After touching at Halifax, Nova Scotia, Alhena reached Belfast, Northern Ireland, on 27 February and remained there for approximately two weeks discharging her passengers, equipment, and supplies. She made a stop at Clydebank, Scotland, on 14 March and sailed two days later for the United States. The vessel reached New York on the 25th.

==== Assigned to the Pacific ====
The ship departed the east coast on 9 April, bound for the Canal Zone; transited the canal on the 19th; and set her course for the Tonga Islands. She reached Tongatapu on 9 May; landed Army and Navy personnel; left that island two weeks later; and arrived at San Diego, California, on 5 June. While in port, the vessel underwent repairs and alterations before taking on marines and equipment for transportation to the South Pacific.

==== Assault on the Solomon Islands ====
On 1 July, Alhena got underway for Tongatapu. Upon her arrival there, she was assigned to Amphibious Forces, Pacific Fleet. A few days later, the vessel sailed to the Fiji Islands to participate in amphibious landing exercises in preparation for the American thrust into the Solomon Islands in which United States forces would take the offensive for the first time in World War II. After completing the exercises, she sortied with Task Group (TG) 62.1 for Guadalcanal, arrived off that island on 7 August, and began unloading operations. In spite of heavy enemy air attacks, the ship carried out her task successfully and got underway on the evening of the 9th for Espiritu Santo, New Hebrides, where she arrived at 1409hrs on 12 August. The ship took on another load of cargo; set out for the Solomons on the 20th; reached Tulagi two days later; and began discharging sorely needed supplies. She meanwhile took on casualties and prisoners of war for evacuation to Espiritu Santo and reached that island on 24 August.

==== Hit by a torpedo ====
During the next month, Alhena carried out a series of supply runs between Espiritu Santo and Efate, New Hebrides. This pattern of operations was interrupted on 24 September, when she left Espiritu Santo bound for the Solomons. She moored off Guadalcanal on the 26th and began a routine of unloading her cargo ashore during the day and retiring seaward each night. The work proceeded successfully in spite of heavy Japanese air harassment until the task was completed on the 29th and the vessel sailed for Espiritu Santo. At 2354, a torpedo from the Japanese submarine I-4 struck the ship in the area of the number five hold and caused extensive damage in the after part of the ship. The attack killed four crewmen, wounded 20, and left one crewman and over 25 Marines (being evacuated to a hospital) missing. Fires broke out but were quickly brought under control. The crew constructed temporary bulkheads out of sheets of plywood and other lumber to fill up the holes. She was unable to make any headway and drifted throughout the night and the next day. Monssen (DD-436) came alongside on 1 October and took Alhena in tow. The tug Navajo (AT-64) relieved the destroyer the next day, and continued on toward the New Hebrides with the cargo ship in tow. They reached Espiritu Santo on the 7th, and work began on temporary repairs to the ship. On 16 October, Navajo once again took Alhena in tow and headed for New Caledonia. They reached Noumea on the 20th, and the repair work continued until 8 November when she got underway towed by the seagoing tug Navajo over 2500 miles for Australia. She reached Sydney on 20 November and remained there until the following June undergoing final repairs and conversion to an attack cargo ship.

==== Reconfigured as attack cargo ship ====
As a result of her new configuration, the vessel was redesignated AKA-9 on 26 November 1942. Finally, over eight months after being torpedoed, Alhena returned to duty in the South Pacific. She left Sydney on 10 June 1943 and shaped a course for Nouméa. During the next few months, the ship was engaged in runs between Nouméa and Guadalcanal and also made port calls at Auckland, New Zealand, to take on cargo. In late October and November 1943, Alhena took part in operations on November 1Bougainville, the largest of the Solomon Islands. Although taken under enemy attack several times, Alhena discharged her troops and supplies without sustaining any damage. She made 2 more re-supply runs to Empress Agusta Bay, Bougainville in December 1943 and January 1944.

==== Saipan ====
Following this operation, the ship resumed her runs between Nouméa and Guadalcanal and continued that duty until departing Guadalcanal on 24 March 1944, bound for Hawaii. Following a stop at Funafuti, Ellice Islands, en route, she reached Hawaii on 9 April. Throughout April and May, Alhena conducted maneuvers and loading operations in Hawaiian waters in preparation for the impending assault on Saipan. She departed Honolulu on 30 May with troops of the 2nd Marine Division embarked, bound via Eniwetok for Saipan. Alhena arrived off Saipan on 15 June and began debarking her troops. Despite undergoing two air attacks while unloading, she completed the process on the 23d, left the area, touched at Pearl Harbor on 4 July, and pushed on the next day toward the California coast. The ship entered San Francisco Bay on the 11th and, shortly thereafter, began a three-month period of overhaul.

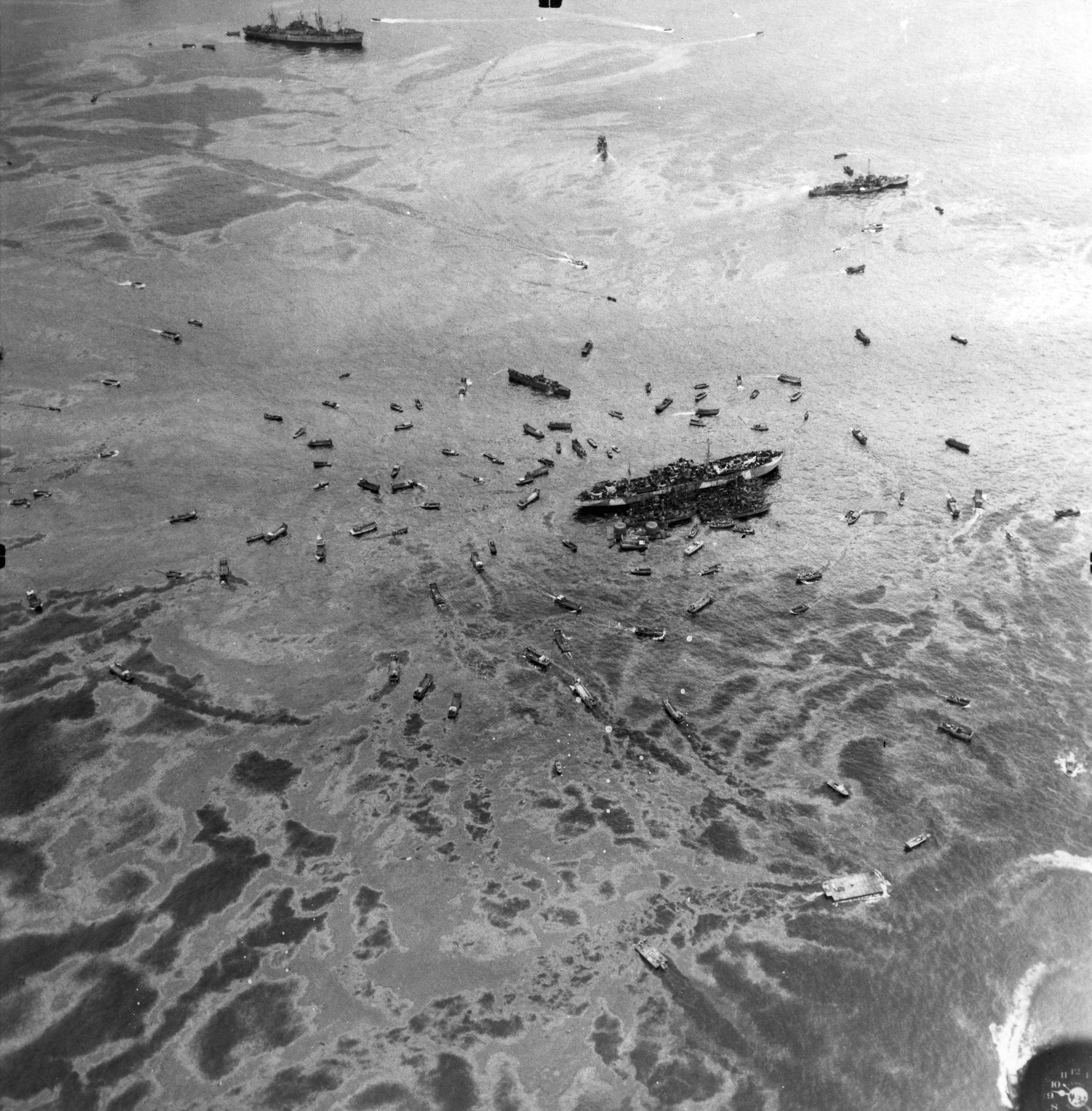
Explosion of the Mount Hood (AE-11) in Seeadler Harbor, Manus, Admiralty Islands, 10 November 1944. Small craft gathered around the Mindanao (ARG-3) during salvage and rescue efforts shortly after Mount Hood blew up about 350 yards (320 m) away from Mindanao's port side. Mindanao, and seven motor minesweepers (YMS) moored to her starboard side, were damaged by the blast, as were the Alhena (top left center) and Oberrender (DE-344), (top right). Note the extensive oil slick, with tracks through it made by small craft.

==== The Philippines ====
The work was finished in early October, and Alhena got underway on the 13th bound for the Admiralty Islands. She reached Manus on 29 October. While at anchor in Seeadler Harbor waiting to discharge her cargo, she was damaged by the explosion of ammunition ship Mount Hood (AE-11) at 0855 on 10 November. Three of her crew members were killed and 70 were wounded, 25 of them seriously. Alhena herself suffered extensive damage above decks which necessitated some six weeks of repair work. The ship resumed action in mid-December and participated in the invasion of Luzon at Lingayen Gulf in January 1945. She then sailed to Ulithi to take on cargo and moved thence to Guam to embark troops of the 3rd Marine Division.

==== Iwo Jima ====
The Alhena in company with Task unit 51.1.4 anchored off the eastern beaches of Iwo Jima at 0920, 27 February, and commenced unloading operations. These operations were substantially hampered throughout the entire period by the northeasterly swell, which caused damage to this vessel and craft loading alongside, in addition to creating a shortage of lighterage by limiting operations at the beach. Cargo consisted of 10 officers and 225 enlisted men of the 3d Marine Regiment 3d Marine Division, vehicles, petroleum, rations, clothing, water, and ammunition.

Only one percent of total cargo was unloaded prior to 1813 hours, at which time night retirement was made with transport vessels of various units as designated by the Commander Joint Expeditionary Force. Retirement was continued without incident and return to anchorage was made at 0817 hours, 28 February, at which time unloading was recommenced. Unloading operations were interrupted by an air raid warning at 0130 hours, 1 March, during which smoke was made for a period of one-half-hour. Unloading was secured and night retirement commenced at 1730 hours in company with units of the Joint Expeditionary Force Reserve. During both night retirements boats were left behind. After an uneventful night the ship was anchored at 0809 hours, 2 March, and unloading again commenced. During the afternoon LSM 260 was brought alongside, with considerable difficulty, but before unloading could be started it was recalled by Commander Task Group 51.1. LSM 145 secured alongside just before operations were suspended at 2122 hours by an air raid warning during which smoke was made for fifteen minutes. The LSM stayed alongside during this interval, and unloading operations were resumed immediately upon securing from battle stations.

At 0958 hours, 3 March, anchor was weighed and course set for anchorage off the western beaches of Iwo Jima where the vessel anchored at 1036 hours and resumed unloading under appreciably better sea conditions. Thirty-three percent of total cargo had been unloaded up to this time. A beach party consisting of one officer and ten men was sent ashore to augment the small force at the newly established beach. Unloading continued until 1020 of 4 March, at which time all equipment of forces landed or to be landed had been sent ashore. During the remainder of the day the ship's platoon was disembarked, a staff communication organization was taken aboard from two units of the fire support group, and eleven casualties were received from the beach. Boats were dispatched to unload vessels carrying Garrison Group Zero. At 2340 reloading of certain THIRD MARINES equipment was commenced, which was completed at 0334 hours, 5 March. The remainder of this day was spent in regaining control of boats dispatched the previous night, recovering beach party, and exchanging operative boats for the imperative boats of LSD-2.

Departure from the area was made at 1748 hours in company with Transport Division THIRTY-THREE less USS Hercules (AK-41), plus USS Whiteside (AKA-90).

==== Okinawa ====
Having discharged her embarked troops and equipment, the ship left the Volcano Islands and proceeded to Nouméa. Alhena remained in port there for nearly two months in reserve for the Okinawa invasion. In late May, she steamed to Leyte to replenish her supplies. From early June through the end of the war in September, Alhena operated between Manila, Philippines, and various ports in New Guinea carrying troops, supplies, and equipment. Among her ports of call were Finschhafen, Hollandia, and Oro Bay, New Guinea.

==== Post-war activity ====
On 13 October, Alhena entered Tokyo Bay. She operated in Japanese waters supporting American occupation forces through 19 November. On that day, the ship departed Yokosuka, Japan, bound for the United States. The cargo vessel paused at Seattle, Washington, before sailing on to San Francisco. After remaining in port through the Christmas holidays, she got underway on 6 January 1946 for the Far East. The ship made port at Okinawa on 22 January and soon continued on to Tsingtao, China. After discharging her cargo there, she left Chinese waters on 2 March, bound for the United States.

Alhena arrived at San Francisco on 18 March and underwent a period of voyage repairs. She set sail on 12 April and shaped a course for the east coast. After transiting the Panama Canal, the cargo ship arrived at Norfolk on 1 May. One week later, she moved on to New York City. Alhena was decommissioned there on 22 May 1946, and her name was struck from the Navy list on 15 August 1946. She was transferred to the War Shipping Administration on 12 September 1946.

=== Honors and awards ===
- Combat Action Ribbon (three awards)
- China Service Medal
- American Defense Service Medal with "A" device
- American Campaign Medal
- European–African–Middle Eastern Campaign Medal
- Asiatic-Pacific Campaign Medal with six battle stars for World War II service
- World War II Victory Medal
- Navy Occupation Service Medal with "ASIA" clasp
- Philippine Republic Presidential Unit Citation (Republic of the Philippines)
- Philippine Liberation Medal with one star for World War II service (Republic of the Philippines)

Alhena′s six battle stars were for:

- Guadalcanal-Tulagi landings, 7 to 9 August 1942
- Marianas operation: Capture and occupation of Saipan, 15 to 23 June 1944
- Capture and defense of Guadalcanal, 29 September 1942
- Luzon operation: Lingayen Gulf landings, 9 January 1945
- Treasury-Bougainville operation: Occupation and defense of Cape Torokina, 1 and 13 November 1943
- Iwo Jima operation: Assault and occupation of Iwo Jima, 9 March 1945.

Alhena was awarded the Combat Action Ribbon retroactively for the actions of:

- 29 September 1943
- October–November 1943
- 15–23 June 1944

== Civilian operation ==
Upon transfer to the War Shipping Administration on 12 September 1946 the ship, again Robin Kettering, entered the Hudson River Reserve Fleet, staying there until brought out briefly (24 March to 1 April 1947) under a general agency agreement with former owner Seas Shipping Company. On 16 October 1947 Seas Shipping repurchased the vessel operating it until 1957.

=== Robin Kettering ===
Robin Kettering and the five sister C2-S ships composed the Robin Line's Robin Lockley Class cargo liners. Twelve passengers were accommodated in outside double cabins and inside single cabins with private bathrooms. The full width of the ship in the cabin area had a dining room flanked by verandah lounge areas. (Note: See photos and passenger area plan in referenced brochure.)

In May 1948 Robin Kettering departed Erie Basin, Brooklyn, to begin service around Africa into the Indian Ocean. A Seas Shipping brochure effective 1 June 1954 shows the ports from New York to be Walvis Bay, Luderitz, Cape Town, Port Elizabeth, East London, Durban, Lourenço Marques, Beira, Dar-es-Salaam, Tanga, Zanzibar, Mombasa, Tamatave, Majunga, other Madagascar ports, and Mauritius.

=== Flying Hawk ===
The Robin Line, operating twelve ships, was sold in 1957 with eight ships acquired by Moore McCormack Lines with four, including Robin Kettering, acquired for operation by American Export Lines. Seas Shipping had contracted with Moore McCormack on 1 March 1957 to sell the twelve Robin Line ships for $17 million with two specific vessels excepted, either one or both, from the sale at the option of the buyer. The two vessels were Robin Kettering and Robin Doncaster. On 11 April 1957 Moore McCormack exercised the option to exclude both vessels. Seas Shipping then sold each vessel to independent third parties. (Note: The two excepted ships were unique among the C2-S ships in one respect which may account for the exception. They both had undergone extensive modifications for war service by the U.S. Navy and British Ministry of War Transport. Vessel Status Cards for the other four show they were operated by the War Shipping Administration. Conversion to cargo-passenger service for the two modified ships thus would probably cost more.)

Robin Kettering was sold to Flying Hawk, Inc., renamed Flying Hawk which was then sold in July 1962 to American Export Lines in which Isbrandtsen Company Inc., of New York had acquired a controlling interest. (Note: The MARAD status card tracks ownership of the hull. This appears to be a case in which a holding company taking the name of the ship owned the hull which was operated by a shipping line.) That line operated the ship along with Flying Endeavor, Flying Fish, and Flying Gull as "Special C-2 type freighters" for 120-day "'Round-World voyages" accommodating twelve passengers maintaining the passenger area configuration of the Robin Line.

== Disposal ==
In March 1971 the ship was sold for scrap to a foreign company.
