= SS El Capitan =

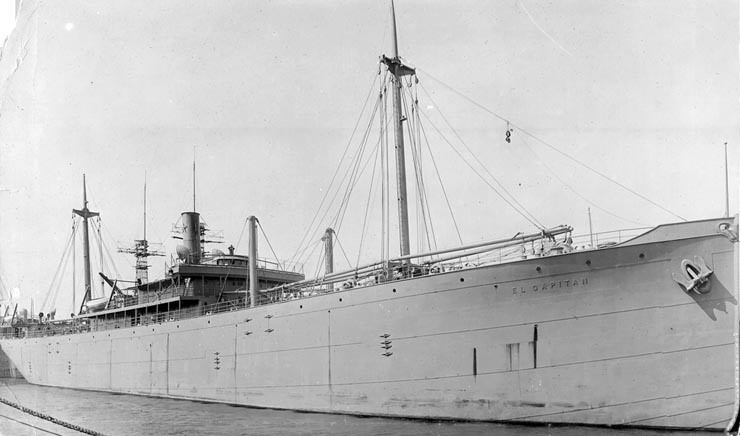
- SS El Capitan c. 1917, prior to her U.S. Navy service.

History
- Name: SS El Capitan; USS El Capitan; SS El Capitan
- Owner: United States Shipping Board; Southern Pacific Company; War Shipping Administration
- Operator: United States Shipping Board; United States Navy; Southern Pacific Company; United States Lines for War Shipping Administration
- Port of registry: (United States) New York (1917 – 1 October 1941); Panama (1 October 1941 – 10 July 1942)
- Ordered: 2 December 1915
- Builder: Newport News Shipbuilding and Drydock Company, Newport News, Virginia
- Launched: Uncertain (See "History")
- Sponsored by: Katherine Jessup
- Completed: 1917
- Acquired: (WW I) 3 August 1917 USSB; 21 March 1918 Navy
- Commissioned: (USN) 21 March 1918
- Decommissioned: (USN) 1 February 1919
- Identification: United States Official Number: 285587
- Fate: Damaged by aircraft, abandoned, sunk by torpedo 9–10 July 1942.

General characteristics
- Type: Cargo ship
- Tonnage: 5,216 GRT; 6,200 long tons (6,300 t)
- Displacement: 10,200 tons
- Length: 380 ft 3.75 in (115.9 m) over all; 364 ft (110.9 m) between perpendiculars
- Beam: 51 ft 2 in (15.6 m)
- Draft: 23 ft (7.0 m) loaded mean
- Depth: 33 ft 6 in (10.2 m) molded to hurricane deck
- Propulsion: Triple-expansion steam engine, cys: 24.25 in (61.6 cm), 41.5 in (105.4 cm) and 72 in (182.9 cm) diameter with 48 in (121.9 cm) stroke
- Speed: 11 knots (12.7 mph; 20.4 km/h)
- Complement: (WW I, Navy) 52
- Armament: (WW I, Navy) 1 × 6-inch (152-millimeter) gun

El Capitan, (Note: Though some sources give other names contemporary references and Lloyd's Register indicate no names other than El Capitan from construction until loss.) United States Official Number 285587, was built in 1917 by the Newport News Shipbuilding and Drydock Company at Newport News, Virginia for the Southern Pacific Company's Atlantic Steamship Lines. In 1915 the line operated from the North River piers 49–52 at the foot of 11th Street in New York to New Orleans under the flag and name of Morgan Line, which combined with the Southern Pacific's rail service from the Pacific Coast was known as the Sunset Gulf Route. During World War I the ship was purchased from the builder before delivery to the owner by the United States Shipping Board (USSB) which later turned the ship over to the United States Navy which placed her in commission as USS El Capitan (ID-1407) from 1918 to 1919. El Capitan was returned to commercial service by the Southern Pacific Company until just before the United States entry into World War II when the United States War Shipping Administration (WSA) acquired the ship, changed her registry to Panama and placed her in operation under its agent, United States Lines. El Capitan was in the Arctic convoy PQ 17 to the Soviet Union when she came under air attack on 9 July 1942, was damaged and abandoned to be sunk by torpedo just after midnight on 10 July.

== Construction and design ==
Both El Capitan and sister ship El Almirante were designed by the line's engineer, A. S. Hebble, as single screw ships with three complete steel decks on a transverse framing system. Watertight bulkheads extending to the main deck were fitted at the forepeak, between #1 and #2 holds, aft the engine room and after peak. A watertight bulkhead extending only to the lower deck was fitted aft the ballast tank.

Propulsion was by a triple-expansion steam engine of 24.25 inches (61.6 cm), 41.5 inches (105.4 cm) and 72 inches (182.9 cm) diameter with 48 inches (121.9 cm) stroke designed for 75 revolutions per minute with steam provided by two oil burning Scotch marine boiler's designed to allow the ship to make 11 knots (12.7 mph; 20.4 km/h) when fully loaded to the designed 25 feet (7.6 m) draft. The ships were specifically designed with a limited speed of 12 knots (13.8 mph; 22.2 km/h) as their 6,500-ton cargo was to be "slow moving freight."

== History ==
The precise launch date is given on widely differing dates in sources. 18 August 1917 is given by Navy. September 21 is given in the Annual Report of the Commissioner of Navigation to the Secretary of Commerce for the fiscal year ending 30 June 1918. The photograph of the ship underway that leads the article "New Southern Pacific Freighters" has an annotation of "8-4-17" indicating the ship was launched, fitted out and underway by 4 August 1917.

=== World War I ===
Before delivery to the Southern Pacific Company the ship was requisitioned by an order on 3 August 1917 directly from the builder by the USSB Emergency Fleet Corporation with payment of $230,000. The 19 September 1917 bill of sale specifies that "nothing herein shall be construed to the prejudice of any legal or equitable right or claim" by the "former owner," the Southern Pacific Company. After the United States entered World War I, the United States Shipping Board transferred El Capitan to the U.S. Navy for war service on 21 March 1918. The Navy assigned her the naval registry Identification Number (Id. No.) 1407 and commissioned her the same day as USS El Capitan.

Assigned to the Naval Overseas Transportation Service, El Capitan made four transatlantic voyages between 29 March 1918 and 23 November 1918. She carried various supplies and equipment from United States East Coast ports to Brest, Le Verdon-sur-Mer, and Le Havre in France, and to Plymouth and Devonport in England. On her second voyage, one day out of Philadelphia, Pennsylvania, she sighted a German submarine abeam. Her guns forced the submarine to dive before it could attack.

=== Interwar years ===
El Capitan was decommissioned on 1 February 1919 and transferred to the Shipping Board the same day for return to the Southern Pacific Steamship Company for commercial service. On 30 September 1921 Captain J. H. Halsey, the ship's wartime commander now in command in civilian service, hosted a retirement luncheon for the line's Commodore, Edwin F. Parker.

=== World War II and loss ===
Before the United States entered World War II, El Capitan was taken over by the United States War Shipping Administration (WSA) and was placed under the operation of United States Lines as WSA's agent on 26 June 1941. She was transferred to Panamanian registry (a flag of convenience) on 1 October 1941 without an official number and change in code letters.

El Capitan was part of Arctic convoy PQ 17, dispersed on Admiralty orders on 4 July 1942, and after picking up 19 survivors of SS John Witherspoon reached Novaya Zemlya where a small convoy of five other merchant ships and escorts was assembled. That convoy was attacked on 9 July 1942 by Junkers Ju 88 aircraft with El Capitan suffering ruptured hull with holds #4 and #5 and the engine room flooding. All personnel, including those rescued, were taken off by HMS Lord Austin, an armed trawler which also tried to scuttle the ship, and made Archangel. The hulk was torpedoed by U-251 just after midnight on 10 July.

== Bibliography ==
- Commissioner of Navigation (1918). Annual Report of the Commissioner of Navigation to the Secretary of Commerce (fiscal year ending June 30, 1918). Washington, D.C.: United States Government Printing Office.
- Helgason, Guðmundur. "El Capitan". Ships hit by U-boats. uboat.net.
- International Marine Engineering (1917). "New Southern Pacific Freighters". International Marine Engineering. 22 (December 1917). New York: Aldrich Publishing Company.
- Jungen, C. W. (1922). "Ocean Unit of Lines That Span Continent". Southern Pacific Bulletin. 11 (January 1922). San Francisco: Southern Pacific.
- Lee, Bill (July 2011). "The Ship Sponsors of Newport News" (PDF). Archived from the original (PDF) on 21 February 2015.
- Lloyds. "Lloyd's Register (1930–31)" (PDF). Lloyd's Register (through PlimsollShipData).
- Lloyds. "Lloyd's Register (1941–42)" (PDF). Lloyd's Register (through PlimsollShipData).
- Luce, G. W. (1920). "Sunset Gulf—The 100 Per Cent Route". Southern Pacific Bulletin. 10 (February 1921). San Francisco: Southern Pacific.
- Maritime Administration. "El Capitan". Ship History Database Vessel Status Card. U.S. Department of Transportation, Maritime Administration.
- Marine Journal (1921). "Retires Gracefully After Forty Years of Service". Marine Journal. 44 (October 8, 1921). New York: Edgar Pennington Young.
- Naval History And Heritage Command. "El Capitan". Dictionary of American Naval Fighting Ships. Naval History And Heritage Command.
- Rand McNally (1915). Rand McNally Hudson River Guide. New York, Chicago: Rand McNally & Company.
- United States of America (1922). United States-Norway Arbitration—Counter Case of the United States of America, Appendix. Washington, D.C.: United States Government Printing Office.
