= Seas Shipping Company =

Former US shipping company

Seas Shipping Company Robin Line
- Founded: 1920
- Founder: Farrell family and Lewis family
- Defunct: 1957
- Fate: sold to Moore-McCormack
- Successor: Moore-McCormack
- Headquarters: New York City, New York

Seas Shipping Company, owner of the Robin Line, was founded in 1920 in New York City, New York. The Robin Line named all its ships starting with the word Robin. Robin Line was intercoastal fleet started as the predecessor of the Farrell Lines founded in 1948. James A. Farrell, Jr., and John J. Farrell, sons of James Augustine Farrell, president of US Steel founded the Robin Line. Robin Line had two major stock holders the Lewis family and the Farrell family. In 1933, the two families ended their partnership and became rivals. The Robin line entered the Africa trade routes, competing against the Farrell Line. The two companies remained rivals until the death of Arthur W. Lewis, Jr. in 1954. Robin Line was sold to Moore-McCormack Lines in 1957.

During World War II Seas Shipping Company was active in charter shipping with the Maritime Commission and War Shipping Administration.

- Robin Line ports: New York, Walvis Bay, Luderitz, Cape Town, Port Elizabeth, East London, Durban, Lourenço Marques, Beira, Dar es Salaam, Tanga, Zanzibar, Mombasa, Tamatave, Majunga, other Madagascar ports, and Mauritius.

== World War II ==
Seas Shipping Company ships were used to help the World War II effort. During World War II Seas Shipping Company operated Merchant navy ships for the United States Shipping Board. During World War II Sword Line, Inc. was active with charter shipping with the Maritime Commission and War Shipping Administration. Seas Shipping Company operated Liberty ships and Victory ships for the merchant navy. The ship was run by its Seas Shipping Company crew and the US Navy supplied United States Navy Armed Guards to man the deck guns and radio.

== Ships ==
- SS Eldena (1919)
- SS Robin Doncaster (owned 1948 to 1957)
  - type C2 ship with reefer storage and 12 passengers housing, for South Africa and East Africa service:
- SS Robin Wentley
- SS Robin Locksley

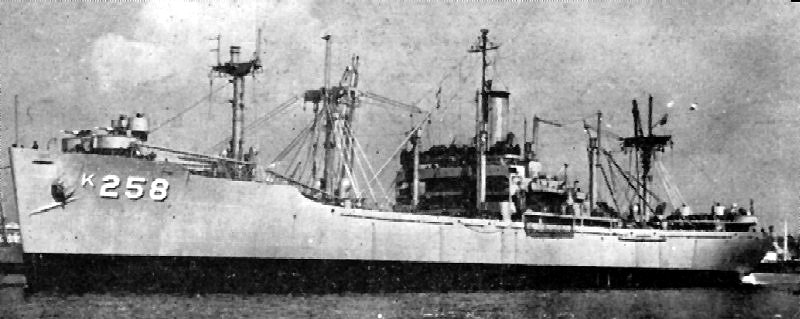
A Victory ship of World War II

Liberty ship of World War II

- SS Robin Tuxford
- SS Robin Doncaster
- SS Robin Kettering
- SS Robin Sherwood
- SS Robin Mowbray
- SS Robin Goodfellow
- SS Robin Hood
- SS Robin Trent
- SS Robin Kirk
- SS Robin Gray, scuttled in 1944 to make Omaha Beach breakwater.
- SS Robin Moor
- Empire Curlew (owned 1947 to 1957)

== World war II ships ==
=== Victory ships ===
- SS Clovis Victory
- SS Hibbing Victory
- SS Gainsville Victory
- SS Greenville Victory
- SS Park Victory

=== Liberty ships ===
- SS Robin Kettering
- SS Arthur R. Lewis
- SS William Moultrie
- SS Aquarama (post war work)
- SS Sidney Lanier
- SS James Gunn
- SS Noah Brown
- SS Irvin S. Cobb
- SS Francis L. Lee
- SS Nicholas Biddle
- SS John Witherspoon
- SS Ira Nelson Morris
- SS Charles W. Stiles
- SS Laura Bridgman
- SS Amy Lowell
- SS Walter Colton

=== Other ===
- SS Empire Lynx, torpedoed November 3, 1942, sank by U-132 while with Convoy SC 107.
- SS West Chetac, torpedoed and sunk September 24, 1942 by U-175
- SS West Imboden, torpedoed and sunk April 21, 1942 by U-752

== See also ==
- World War II United States Merchant Navy
- James River, Reserve Fleet
