= SS Sidney Lanier =

Liberty ship of WWII

History

United States
- Name: Sidney Lanier
- Namesake: Sidney Lanier
- Owner: War Shipping Administration (WSA)
- Operator: Seas Shipping Co., Inc.
- Ordered: as type (EC2-S-C1) hull, MC hull 1197
- Builder: St. Johns River Shipbuilding Company, Jacksonville, Florida
- Cost: $2,229,005
- Yard number: 5
- Way number: 5
- Laid down: 22 October 1942
- Launched: 22 May 1943
- Sponsored by: Mrs. Thomas W. Ryan, Jr.
- Completed: 7 July 1943
- Identification: Call sign: KIVG
- Fate: Placed in National Defense Reserve Fleet, Astoria, Oregon, 6 December 1946; Sold for scrapping, 14 March 1961, withdrawn from fleet, 25 May 1961

General characteristics
- Class & type: Liberty ship; type EC2-S-C1, standard
- Tonnage: 10,865 LT DWT; 7,176 GRT
- Displacement: 3,380 long tons (3,434 t) (light); 14,245 long tons (14,474 t) (max)
- Length: 441 feet 6 inches (135 m) oa; 416 feet (127 m) pp; 427 feet (130 m) lwl
- Beam: 57 feet (17 m)
- Draft: 27 ft 9.25 in (8.4646 m)
- Installed power: 2 × Oil fired 450 °F (232 °C) boilers, operating at 220 psi (1,500 kPa); 2,500 hp (1,900 kW)
- Propulsion: 1 × triple-expansion steam engine, (manufactured by General Machinery Corp., Hamilton, Ohio); 1 × screw propeller
- Speed: 11.5 knots (21.3 km/h; 13.2 mph)
- Capacity: 562,608 cubic feet (15,931 m^{3}) (grain); 499,573 cubic feet (14,146 m^{3}) (bale)
- Complement: 38–62 USMM; 21–40 USNAG
- Armament: Varied by ship; Bow-mounted 3-inch (76 mm)/50-caliber gun; Stern-mounted 4-inch (102 mm)/50-caliber gun; 2–8 × single 20-millimeter (0.79 in) Oerlikon anti-aircraft (AA) cannons and/or, 2–8 × 37-millimeter (1.46 in) M1 AA guns

SS Sidney Lanier was a Liberty ship built in the United States during World War II. She was named after Sidney Lanier, an American musician, poet and author.

== Construction ==
Sidney Lanier was laid down on 22 October 1942, under a Maritime Commission (MARCOM) contract, MC hull 1197, by the St. Johns River Shipbuilding Company, Jacksonville, Florida; she was sponsored by Mrs. Thomas W. Ryan Jr., the wife of the corporate director of the St. John's River SB Co., she was launched on 22 May 1943.

== History ==
She was allocated to Seas Shipping Co., Inc., on 7 July 1943. On 6 December 1946, she was placed in the National Defense Reserve Fleet, Astoria, Oregon. On 22 April 1955, she was withdrawn from the fleet to be prepared for loading with grain under the "Grain Program 1955", she returned unloaded on 2 May 1955. She was sold for scrapping, on 14 March 1961, to Schnitzer Brothers, for $56,785.21. She was withdrawn from the fleet, 25 May 1961.

== Bibliography ==
- "St. John's River Shipbuilding, Jacksonville FL". www.ShipbuildingHistory.com. 16 October 2010.
- Maritime Administration. "Sidney Lanier". Ship History Database Vessel Status Card. U.S. Department of Transportation, Maritime Administration.
- Davies, James (May 2004). "Specifications (As-Built)" (PDF). p. 23.
- "SS Sidney Lanier".
