= SS Irvin S. Cobb =

Liberty ship of WWII

History

United States
- Name: Irvin S. Cobb
- Namesake: Irvin S. Cobb
- Owner: War Shipping Administration (WSA)
- Operator: Seas Shipping Co., Inc.
- Ordered: as type (EC2-S-C1) hull, MC hull 2491
- Awarded: 23 April 1943
- Builder: St. Johns River Shipbuilding Company, Jacksonville, Florida
- Cost: $1,050,663
- Yard number: 55
- Way number: 1
- Laid down: 13 July 1944
- Launched: 22 August 1944
- Sponsored by: Ruth Alexander
- Completed: 31 August 1944
- Identification: Call sign: WSQQ
- Fate: Laid up in the National Defense Reserve Fleet, Mobile, Alabama, 15 July 1949; Sold for scrapping, 6 July 1967, withdrawn from fleet, 18 July 1967

General characteristics
- Class & type: Liberty ship; type EC2-S-C1, standard
- Tonnage: 10,865 LT DWT; 7,176 GRT
- Displacement: 3,380 long tons (3,434 t) (light); 14,245 long tons (14,474 t) (max)
- Length: 441 feet 6 inches (135 m) oa; 416 feet (127 m) pp; 427 feet (130 m) lwl
- Beam: 57 feet (17 m)
- Draft: 27 ft 9.25 in (8.4646 m)
- Installed power: 2 × Oil fired 450 °F (232 °C) boilers, operating at 220 psi (1,500 kPa); 2,500 hp (1,900 kW)
- Propulsion: 1 × triple-expansion steam engine, (manufactured by General Machinery Corp., Hamilton, Ohio); 1 × screw propeller
- Speed: 11.5 knots (21.3 km/h; 13.2 mph)
- Capacity: 562,608 cubic feet (15,931 m^{3}) (grain); 499,573 cubic feet (14,146 m^{3}) (bale)
- Complement: 38–62 USMM; 21–40 USNAG
- Armament: Varied by ship; Bow-mounted 3-inch (76 mm)/50-caliber gun; Stern-mounted 4-inch (102 mm)/50-caliber gun; 2–8 × single 20-millimeter (0.79 in) Oerlikon anti-aircraft (AA) cannons and/or, 2–8 × 37-millimeter (1.46 in) M1 AA guns

SS Irvin S. Cobb was a Liberty ship built in the United States during World War II. She was named after Irvin S. Cobb, an American author, humorist, editor and columnist from Paducah, Kentucky.

== Construction ==
Irvin S. Cobb was laid down on 13 July 1944, under a Maritime Commission (MARCOM) contract, MC hull 2491, by the St. Johns River Shipbuilding Company, Jacksonville, Florida; she was sponsored by Ruth Alexander, the wife of H.F. Alexander, and friend of the namesake, and was launched on 22 August 1944.

== History ==
She was allocated to the Seas Shipping Co., Inc., on 31 August 1944. On 15 July 1949, she was laid up in the National Defense Reserve Fleet, Mobile, Alabama. She was sold for scrapping, 13 May 1970, to Union Minerals & Alloys, Corp., along with SS John S. Pillsbury, for $90,260. She was removed from the fleet, 18 July 1967.

== Bibliography ==
- "St. John's River Shipbuilding, Jacksonville FL". www.ShipbuildingHistory.com. 16 October 2010.
- Maritime Administration. "Irvin S. Cobb". Ship History Database Vessel Status Card. U.S. Department of Transportation, Maritime Administration.
- Davies, James (May 2004). "Specifications (As-Built)" (PDF). p. 23.
- "SS Irvin S. Cobb".
