= SS Robin Doncaster =

1940 cargo vessel

History
- Name: Robin Doncaster (1940-41); Empire Curlew (1941-42); Robin Doncaster (1942-57); Flying Gull (1957-68)
- Owner: United States Maritime Commission (1940-41); Ministry of War Transport (1941-42); United States Maritime Commission (1942-48); Seas Shipping Co Inc (1948-57); Flying Gull Inc (1957-62); American Export Isbrandtsen Lines Inc (1962-68)
- Operator: Ministry of War Transport (1941-42) (1941-42); War Shipping Administration (1942-46); United States Maritime Commission (1946-48); Seas Shipping Co Inc (1948-57); Isbrandtsen & Co Inc (1957-62); American Export Isbrandtsen Lines Inc (1962-68)
- Port of registry: (United States) New York (1940-41); United Kingdom (1941-42); (United States) New York (1942-68)
- Builder: Bethlehem Steel Co
- Cost: $2,250,000
- Yard number: 4342
- Launched: 7 December 1940
- Completed: 16 April 1941
- Commissioned: January 1944
- Decommissioned: April 1946
- Maiden voyage: 14 April 1941
- Out of service: April 1942 - January 1944
- Identification: United States Official Number 240462 (1941, 1942-68); United Kingdom Official Number 168169 (1941-42); Code Letters WMRD (1947-68)
- Fate: Scrapped in 1968

General characteristics
- Class & type: Type C2-S cargo ship (1940-41); Cargo liner (1944-68)
- Tonnage: 7,101 GRT; 4,258 NRT; 9,970 DWT
- Length: 479 ft 8 in (146.20 m)overall; 450 ft 0 in (137.16 m) between perpendiculars
- Beam: 66 ft 0 in (20.12 m) maximum
- Draft: 27 ft 0 in (8.23 m)
- Depth: 43 ft 0 in (13.11 m)
- Propulsion: Two steam turbines, single screw propeller
- Speed: 18.17 knots (33.65 km/h) maximum; 15.5 knots (28.7 km/h) service speed
- Range: 18,500 nautical miles (34,300 km)
- Capacity: 593,655 cubic feet (16,810.4 m^{3}) bale capacity; 659,215 cubic feet (18,666.9 m^{3}) grain capacity; 11,530 cubic feet (326 m^{3}) refrigerated cargo space; 3,485 cubic feet (98.7 m^{3}) special cargo space; 612 long tons (622 t) water; 2,012 long tons (2,044 t) coal; 12 passengers
- Crew: 43

SS Robin Doncaster was a 7,101 GRT cargo liner that was built in 1940 as a Type C2-S cargo ship by Bethlehem Steel Co, Sparrows Point, Maryland, United States for the United States Maritime Commission (USMC). On completion in April 1941, she was transferred to the Ministry of War Transport (MoWT) and renamed Empire Curlew. In 1942, she was transferred to the USMC, regaining her former name Robin Doncaster. She was rebuilt as a troop transport, and entered service with the War Shipping Administration in January 1944. She was returned to the USMC in April 1946 and was sold to Seas Shipping Co Inc in 1948. In 1957, she was sold to Isbrandtsen Lines and was renamed Flying Gull. Sold to American Export Lines in 1962, she served until she was scrapped in 1968.

== Description ==
The ship was built in 1940 by Bethlehem Steel Co, Sparrows Point, Maryland. She was Yard Number 4342, and cost $2,250,000.

The ship was 479 feet 8 inches (146.20 m) long overall (450 feet 0 inches (137.16 m) between perpendiculars), with a beam of 66 feet 0 inches (20.12 m). She had a depth of 34 feet 2 inches (10.41 m), and a draft of 27 feet 0 inches (8.23 m). She was assessed at 7,101 GRT, 4,258 NRT. Her DWT was 9,970.

The ship was propelled by two steam turbines, driving a single screw propeller of 20 feet 0 inches (6.10 m) diameter. The turbines were made by Bethlehem Steel's SR division, Quincy, Massachusetts. Rated at 6,300 shp and driving the propeller at 85 rpm, they could propel her at a normal service speed of 15.5 knots (28.7 km/h), with a maximum speed of 18.17 knots (33.65 km/h).

As built, Robin Doncaster had a bale capacity of 593,655 cubic feet (16,810.4 m^{3}), or a grain capacity of 659,215 cubic feet (18,666.9 m^{3}), as well as capacity for 11,530 cubic feet (326 m^{3}) of refrigerated cargo, and 3,485 cubic feet (98.7 m^{3}) special cargo space in five holds. Carrying 612 long tons (622 t) water and 2,012 long tons (2,044 t) coal, she had a range of 18,500 nautical miles (34,300 km). She had a crew of 43 and could carry twelve passengers. The ship had sixteen 5-ton derricks, one 10-ton derrick and one 30-ton derrick to allow loading and unloading of cargo.

== History ==
Robin Doncaster was built at the request of the Robin Line. Intended for service between the United States and South Africa, she was launched on 7 December 1940.

=== World War II ===
The ship was delivered on 16 April 1941. She was immediately requisitioned by the USMC, for transfer to the MoWT. Robin Doncaster was renamed Empire Curlew. She was placed under the management of Donaldson, Brothers & Black Ltd. The United Kingdom Official Number 168169 was allocated. She departed from Baltimore, Maryland on 20 April for Halifax, Nova Scotia, Canada, arriving on 23 April. She departed two days later, and joined Convoy SA 1, which formed at sea on 30 April and arrived at the Clyde on 3 May. Empire Curlew was a member of Convoy WS 9A, which assembled off Oversay on 3 June 1941. The convoy arrived at Freetown, Sierra Leone on 18 June. It departed Freetown on 20 June and arrived at Durban, South Africa on 4 July. The convoy departed Durban on 8 July and dispersed off Aden on 21 July, its ships then proceeding independently to Suez, Egypt. Empire Curlew arrived at Suez on 25 July, then sailed to Alexandria, Egypt. A return voyage was made to Port Said, Egypt before she returned to Suez, arriving on 10 August. Empire Curlew then sailed to Calcutta India, where she arrived on 23 August. She departed Calcutta on 29 August for Rangoon, Burma, arriving three days later. On 8 September, Empire Curlew departed from Rangoon bound for Cape Town, South Africa, where she arrived on 26 September. She departed the next day for Trinidad, arriving on 11 October and departing the next day for New York, where she arrived on 17 October.

On 2 November, Empire Curlew departed New York for Halifax. She arrived the next day, and on 4 November she joined Convoy TC 14A. The convoy arrived at the Clyde on 12 November. She left the convoy at the Belfast Lough and then sailed to Liverpool, Lancashire, arriving on 13 November. Empire Curlew departed from Liverpool on 5 December for the Clyde, where she joined Convoy WS 14. The convoy assembled off Oversay, and arrived at Freetown, Sierra Leone on 21 December. She departed from Freetown on 25 December for Cape Town, arriving on 5 January 1942.

On 9 January 1942, Empire Curlew departed from Cape Town for Basra, Iraq, where she arrived on 30 January. A voyage was made to Abadan, Iran, from where she departed on 16 February for Bombay, India, arriving four days later. On 1 March, Empire Curlew departed Bombay for Mombasa, Kenya and Tanga, Tanganyika. She departed Tanga on 11 March for Baltimore via Cape Town and Trinidad, arriving at Baltimore on 11 April.

Empire Curlew was returned to the USMC 17 April 1942, documented under U.S. registry and renamed Robin Doncaster 16 May 1942 and operated by Seas Shipping Co. as agent for the War Shipping Administration. Conversion to a transport ship by Sullivan Drydock and Repair Corporation, New York was completed in January 1944. On 4 April 1946 she was transferred back to the USMC for reconversion.

In November 1942, Robin Doncaster transported some of the survivors from the American-owned, Panamanian-flagged merchant ship Plaudit, which had been torpedoed shelled and sunk by U-181 on 8 November at 36°00′S 26°32′E with the loss of three crew. The survivors were rescued by HMSAS Africana on 10 November and transferred to the RAF crash boat Navigator. They were taken to Port Elizabeth, South Africa. Plaudit had been on a voyage from Colombo, Ceylon to the United States via Cape Town, South Africa. She was carrying a cargo of gunny sack, jute, manganese ore and rubber. The survivors were landed at Philadelphia, Pennsylvania on 13 December. She also carried six survivors from the American liberty ship Anne Hutchinson, which had been torpedoed by U-504 with the loss of three crew. Ann Hutchinson was subsequently divided in two parts by explosive charges in an attempt to salvage her cargo of 8,000 barrels of crude oil. Her stern section sank, but the bow section was towed to Port Elizabeth by HMSAS David Haigh. The survivors took to the lifeboats. Ten were rescued by Steel Mariner, with the rest landing at Durban and Port Alfred.

In April 1944, Robin Doncaster transported troops from Camp Matthews, San Diego, California to Noumea, New Caledonia, arriving on 6 May. In September 1944 Robin Doncaster was on a voyage from San Francisco, California to Okinawa, Japan when she suffered two breakdowns at sea. She put into Pearl Harbor, Hawaii for repairs, which took three weeks. Due to this, she avoided being caught in Typhoon Louise.

On 29 September 1944, Robin Doncaster transported troops of the 165th Infantry Regiment who had been involved in Operation Forager from Tanapag Harbor, Saipan Mariana Islands to the Enewetak Atoll and then to Espiritu Santo, Vanuatu, arriving on 4 October.

=== Post-war ===
On 4 April 1946, Robin Doncaster was placed in the Reserve Fleet pending re-conversion to a cargo vessel. She was laid up in the James River, Virginia. On 18 July, Maryland Drydock Company were authorised to remove certain items of equipment from Robin Doncaster for installation on Robin Wentley. The removed items were to be replaced within 60 days at no cost to the War Shipping Administration or USMC. The replacement was recorded as having been completed on 19 May 1947. The planned conversion of Robin Doncaster back to a cargo ship was canceled due to a lack of funds. On 18 March 1947, she was sold to Seas Shipping Company. She was delivered on 7 October.

The United States Official Number 240462 was allocated. Her port of registry was New York. Her Code Letters were WMRD. On 9 January 1952, Robin Doncaster collided with the tug Ruth, which was towing the barge Agram in the Delaware River, Philadelphia. The collision occurred because of confusion over signals given, and the presence of Mormacpenn which was also attempting to pass Ruth. Although agreement was made between Mormacpenn and Ruth as to how the ships would pass, no such agreement was made between Robin Doncaster and Ruth. Robin Doncaster desired to pass port-to-port, whereas Ruth desired the pass to be starboard-to-starboard. After colliding with Ruth, she then collided with Agram, damaging the barge beyond economic repair. The New York Company, the owners of the barge, successfully sued the Seas Shipping Company Inc for damages. Robert B. Wathen, the owner of Ruth was successful in his appeal to be exonerated from blame for the collision, which was placed squarely on the Robin Doncaster.

The Robin Line, operating twelve ships, was sold in 1957 with eight ships acquired by Moore McCormack Lines with four, including Robin Doncaster, acquired for operation by American Export Lines. Seas Shipping had contracted with Moore McCormack on 1 March 1957 to sell the twelve Robin Line ships for $17 million with two specific vessels excepted, either one or both, from the sale at the option of the buyer. The two vessels were Robin Doncaster and Robin Kettering. On 11 April 1957 Moore McCormack exercised the option to exclude both vessels. Seas Shipping then sold each vessel to independent third parties. (Note: The two excepted ships were unique among the C2-S ships in one respect which may account for the exception. They both had undergone extensive modifications for war service by the U.S. Navy and British Ministry of War Transport. Vessel Status Cards for the other four show they were operated by the War Shipping Administration. Conversion to cargo-passenger service for the two modified ships thus would probably cost more.) Robin Doncaster was sold to Flying Gull Inc and renamed Flying Gull. She was operated under the management of Isbrandtsen & Co Inc, retaining the Code Letters WMRD. Flying Gull was sold to American Export Lines in 1962. She was transferred to American Export Isbrandtsen Lines Inc in 1966. About this time, Flying Gull was involved in a collision when she was hit by Batus at Kobe, Japan. Repairs took a week to complete. Flying Gull served until 1968. She arrived on 21 June 1968 at Bilbao, Spain for scrapping by Hierros Arbulu.
