= SS James Gunn =

Liberty ship of WWII

History

United States
- Name: James Gunn
- Namesake: James Gunn
- Owner: War Shipping Administration (WSA)
- Operator: Seas Shipping Co., Inc.
- Ordered: as type (EC2-S-C1) hull, MCE hull 44
- Awarded: 14 March 1941
- Builder: Bethlehem-Fairfield Shipyard, Baltimore, Maryland
- Cost: $1,046,826
- Yard number: 20231
- Way number: 4
- Laid down: 6 April 1942
- Launched: 8 June 1942
- Sponsored by: Mrs. James Ross
- Completed: 24 June 1942
- Identification: Call sign: KFGW
- Fate: Laid up in the National Defense Reserve Fleet, Beaumont, Texas, 6 September 1949; Sold for scrapping, 7 November 1969, withdrawn from fleet, 23 March 1970

General characteristics
- Class & type: Liberty ship; type EC2-S-C1, standard
- Tonnage: 10,865 LT DWT; 7,176 GRT
- Displacement: 3,380 long tons (3,434 t) (light); 14,245 long tons (14,474 t) (max)
- Length: 441 feet 6 inches (135 m) oa; 416 feet (127 m) pp; 427 feet (130 m) lwl
- Beam: 57 feet (17 m)
- Draft: 27 ft 9.25 in (8.4646 m)
- Installed power: 2 × Oil fired 450 °F (232 °C) boilers, operating at 220 psi (1,500 kPa); 2,500 hp (1,900 kW)
- Propulsion: 1 × triple-expansion steam engine, (manufactured by General Machinery Corp., Hamilton, Ohio); 1 × screw propeller
- Speed: 11.5 knots (21.3 km/h; 13.2 mph)
- Capacity: 562,608 cubic feet (15,931 m^{3}) (grain); 499,573 cubic feet (14,146 m^{3}) (bale)
- Complement: 38–62 USMM; 21–40 USNAG
- Armament: Varied by ship; Bow-mounted 3-inch (76 mm)/50-caliber gun; Stern-mounted 4-inch (102 mm)/50-caliber gun; 2–8 × single 20-millimeter (0.79 in) Oerlikon anti-aircraft (AA) cannons and/or, 2–8 × 37-millimeter (1.46 in) M1 AA guns

SS James Gunn was a Liberty ship built in the United States during World War II. She was named after James Gunn, a delegate to the Continental Congress and a United States senator from Georgia.

== Construction ==
James Gunn was laid down on 6 April 1942, under a Maritime Commission (MARCOM) contract, MCE hull 44, by the Bethlehem-Fairfield Shipyard, Baltimore, Maryland; she was sponsored by Mrs. James Ross, the wife of Captain Ross, the manager of the Baltimore office for the ABS, and was launched on 8 June 1942.

== History ==
She was allocated to Seas Shipping Co., Inc., on 24 June 1942. On 6 September 1949, she was laid up in the National Defense Reserve Fleet, Beaumont, Texas. On 7 November 1969, she was sold for scrapping to Southern Scrap Material Co., Ltd. She was withdrawn from the fleet on 23 March 1970.

== Bibliography ==
- "Bethlehem-Fairfield, Baltimore MD". www.ShipbuildingHistory.com. 14 August 2008.
- Maritime Administration. "James Gunn". Ship History Database Vessel Status Card. U.S. Department of Transportation, Maritime Administration.
- Davies, James (May 2004). "Specifications (As-Built)" (PDF). p. 23.
- "SS James Gunn".
