= SS Clovis Victory =

United States Merchant Marine ship

- Typical Victory ship

History

United States
- Name: SS Clovis Victory
- Namesake: Clovis, New Mexico
- Owner: War Shipping Administration
- Operator: Seas Shipping Company
- Builder: California Shipbuilding Company, Los Angeles
- Laid down: April 28, 1944
- Launched: July 8, 1944
- Completed: September 29, 1944
- Fate: Scrapped in 1972

General characteristics
- Class & type: VC2-S-AP3 Victory ship
- Tonnage: 7612 GRT, 4,553 NRT
- Displacement: 15,200 tons
- Length: 455 ft (139 m)
- Beam: 62 ft (19 m)
- Draft: 28 ft (8.5 m)
- Installed power: 8,500 shp (6,300 kW)
- Propulsion: HP & LP turbines geared to a single 20.5-foot (6.2 m) propeller
- Speed: 16.5 knots
- Boats & landing craft carried: 4 Lifeboats
- Complement: 62 Merchant Marine and 28 US Naval Armed Guards
- Armament: 1 × 5 inch (127 mm)/38 caliber gun; 1 × 3 inch (76 mm)/50 caliber gun; 8 × 20 mm Oerlikon

The SS Clovis Victory was the thirty-second Victory ship built during World War II, in 156 days under the Emergency Shipbuilding program. She was launched by the California Shipbuilding Company on June 13, 1944 and completed on August 31, 1944. The ship's United States Maritime Commission designation was VC2- S- AP3, hull number 27, operated by Seas Shipping Company. SS Clovis Victory served in the Pacific Ocean. Victory ships were designed to replace the earlier Liberty ships. Liberty ships were designed to be used just for WW2. Victory ships were designed to last longer and serve the US Navy after the war. The Victory ship differed from a Liberty ship in that they were: faster, longer and wider, taller, had a thinner stack set farther toward the superstructure, and had a long raised forecastle. The sponsor of the Clovis Victory was the wife of the 200th Coast Artillery's Henry Max Miller of Clovis, New Mexico. Major Miller was lost in the sinking of the SS Shinyō Maru on September 7, 1944.

== World War II ==
During World War II the Clovis Victory was a cargo supply ship. In February 1945 Clovis Victory was a back-up ship for the Battle of Iwo Jima. She was not called to go to Iwo Jima. Next she steamed to Saipan. The Navy required the Clovis Victory cargo at Okinawa, so four destroyers escorted her there, where she was anchored for the month of April 1945 off the coast. The Clovis Victory supplied goods for the Battle of Okinawa in April 1945; the battle took about two months. One of the roles of the SS Clovis Victory was to supply smoke screen fog oil in 55-gallon drums to protect the Navy ship harboring during the Battle for Okinawa. This helped to limit the Kamikaze planes attacks. Clovis Victory deck guns also destroyed two enemy planes and helped bring down three others. Clovis Victory survived 60 kamikaze air raids at Okinawa. After the battle she safely returning to San Francisco on August 30, 1946. Near the Clovis Victory at Okinawa was the SS Hobbs Victory, on April 6, 1945, the Hobbs Victory was hit by a kamikaze plane. Hobbs Victory worked to put out the flames, but a few hours later she exploded as she had 6,000 tons of ammunition in her hold. Clovis Victory also spent time at the Enewetak Atoll and Honolulu. On September 20, 1946, she arrived at Manila with food from San Francisco.

After the war, in 1948, she was laid up in the National Defense Reserve Fleet at Suisun Bay, part of the San Francisco Bay, and later moved to Olympia, Washington.

== Korean War ==
From 1950 to 1953 she served in the Korean War, earning the Korean Service Medal and the United Nations Service Medal. She arrived in San Francisco on September 1, 1952, form Korea. In 1957 and 1958 she was managed for the U.S. Department of Commerce. In 1972 she was scrapped in Taiwan.

== Honors ==
Crew of Naval Armed Guard on the SS Clovis Victory earned Battle Stars in World War II for war action during the assault of Okinawa from 19 May to 14 June 1945.

== Sources ==
- Sawyer, L.A. and W.H. Mitchell. Victory ships and tankers: The history of the ‘Victory’ type cargo ships and of the tankers built in the United States of America during World War II, Cornell Maritime Press, 1974, 0-87033-182-5.
- United States Maritime Commission:
- Victory Cargo Ships
