= SS Arthur R. Lewis =

Liberty ship of WWII

History

United States
- Name: Arthur R. Lewis
- Namesake: Arthur R. Lewis
- Owner: War Shipping Administration (WSA)
- Operator: Seas Shipping Co., Inc.
- Ordered: as type (EC2-S-C1) hull, MC hull 2475
- Awarded: 23 April 1943
- Builder: St. Johns River Shipbuilding Company, Jacksonville, Florida
- Cost: $1,067,820
- Yard number: 39
- Way number: 3
- Laid down: 13 March 1944
- Launched: 27 April 1944
- Sponsored by: Mrs. Arthur M. Tode
- Completed: 12 May 1944
- Identification: Call sign: KWWS
- Fate: Laid up in the, National Defense Reserve Fleet, Wilmington, North Carolina, 2 December 1947; Sold for scrapping, 31 August 1964, removed from fleet, 22 October 1964

General characteristics
- Class & type: Liberty ship; type EC2-S-C1, standard
- Tonnage: 10,865 LT DWT; 7,176 GRT
- Displacement: 3,380 long tons (3,434 t) (light); 14,245 long tons (14,474 t) (max)
- Length: 441 feet 6 inches (135 m) oa; 416 feet (127 m) pp; 427 feet (130 m) lwl
- Beam: 57 feet (17 m)
- Draft: 27 ft 9.25 in (8.4646 m)
- Installed power: 2 × Oil fired 450 °F (232 °C) boilers, operating at 220 psi (1,500 kPa); 2,500 hp (1,900 kW)
- Propulsion: 1 × triple-expansion steam engine, (manufactured by Joshua Hendy Iron Works, Sunnyvale, California); 1 × screw propeller
- Speed: 11.5 knots (21.3 km/h; 13.2 mph)
- Capacity: 562,608 cubic feet (15,931 m^{3}) (grain); 499,573 cubic feet (14,146 m^{3}) (bale)
- Complement: 38–62 USMM; 21–40 USNAG
- Armament: Varied by ship; Bow-mounted 3-inch (76 mm)/50-caliber gun; Stern-mounted 4-inch (102 mm)/50-caliber gun; 2–8 × single 20-millimeter (0.79 in) Oerlikon anti-aircraft (AA) cannons and/or, 2–8 × 37-millimeter (1.46 in) M1 AA guns

SS Arthur R. Lewis was a Liberty ship built in the United States during World War II. She was named after Arthur R. Lewis, a shipping magnate. Lewis founded American and Cuban Steamship Lines, Seas Shipping Company, Planet Line, Overseas Company, and Atlantic Coast Shipping Company.

== Construction ==
Arthur R. Lewis was laid down on 13 March 1944, under a Maritime Commission (MARCOM) contract, MC hull 2475, by the St. Johns River Shipbuilding Company, Jacksonville, Florida; she was sponsored by Mrs. Arthur M. Tode, the wife of the president of the Propeller Club of the United States, and was launched on 27 April 1944.

== History ==
She was allocated to the Seas Shipping Co., Inc., on 5 May 1944. On 2 December 1947, she was laid up in the National Defense Reserve Fleet, Wilmington, North Carolina. She was sold for scrapping, 22 September 1964, to Northern Metal Co., for $45,000. She was removed from the fleet on 22 October 1964.

== Bibliography ==
- "St. John's River Shipbuilding, Jacksonville FL". www.ShipbuildingHistory.com. 16 October 2010.
- Maritime Administration. "Arthur R. Lewis". Ship History Database Vessel Status Card. U.S. Department of Transportation, Maritime Administration.
- Davies, James (May 2004). "Specifications (As-Built)" (PDF). p. 23.
- "SS Arthur R. Lewis".
