= SS John Witherspoon =

Liberty ship of WWII

History

United States
- Name: John Witherspoon
- Namesake: John Witherspoon
- Owner: War Shipping Administration (WSA)
- Operator: Seas Shipping Co., Inc.
- Ordered: as type (EC2-S-C1) hull, MCE hull 31
- Awarded: 14 March 1941
- Builder: Bethlehem-Fairfield Shipyard, Baltimore, Maryland
- Cost: $1,177,161
- Yard number: 2018
- Way number: 5
- Laid down: 10 December 1941
- Launched: 4 March 1942
- Sponsored by: Miss Grace Rose Culleton
- Completed: 23 April 1942
- Fate: Sunk, 6 July 1942

General characteristics
- Class & type: Liberty ship; type EC2-S-C1, standard
- Tonnage: 10,865 LT DWT; 7,176 GRT
- Displacement: 3,380 long tons (3,434 t) (light); 14,245 long tons (14,474 t) (max)
- Length: 441 feet 6 inches (135 m) oa; 416 feet (127 m) pp; 427 feet (130 m) lwl
- Beam: 57 feet (17 m)
- Draft: 27 ft 9.25 in (8.4646 m)
- Installed power: 2 × Oil fired 450 °F (232 °C) boilers, operating at 220 psi (1,500 kPa); 2,500 hp (1,900 kW)
- Propulsion: 1 × triple-expansion steam engine, (manufactured by General Machinery Corp., Hamilton, Ohio); 1 × screw propeller
- Speed: 11.5 knots (21.3 km/h; 13.2 mph)
- Capacity: 562,608 cubic feet (15,931 m^{3}) (grain); 499,573 cubic feet (14,146 m^{3}) (bale)
- Complement: 38–62 USMM; 21–40 USNAG
- Armament: Varied by ship; Bow-mounted 3-inch (76 mm)/50-caliber gun; Stern-mounted 4-inch (102 mm)/50-caliber gun; 2–8 × single 20-millimeter (0.79 in) Oerlikon anti-aircraft (AA) cannons and/or, 2–8 × 37-millimeter (1.46 in) M1 AA guns

SS John Witherspoon was a Liberty ship built in the United States during World War II. She was named after John Witherspoon, a Scottish-American Presbyterian minister and a Founding Father of the United States. Politically active, Witherspoon was a delegate from New Jersey to the Second Continental Congress and a signatory to the United States Declaration of Independence. Later, he signed the Articles of Confederation and supported ratification of the Constitution. In 1789 he was convening moderator of the First General Assembly of the Presbyterian Church in the United States of America.

== Construction ==
John Witherspoon was laid down on 10 December 1941, under a Maritime Commission (MARCOM) contract, MCE hull 31, by the Bethlehem-Fairfield Shipyard, Baltimore, Maryland; sponsored by Miss Grace Rose Culleton, the daughter of J. C. Dulleton, the resident MARCOM plant auditor, and was launched on 4 March 1942.

== History ==
She was allocated to Seas Shipping Co.Inc., on 23 April 1942.

=== Sinking ===
John Witherspoon had set out from Baltimore, on her maiden voyage, in June 1942. She sailed from Hvalfjordur, Iceland, on the afternoon of 27 June 1942, with 8,575 LT (8,713 t) of ammunition and tanks aboard, for Arkhangelsk, in Convoy PQ-17. At 16:38, on the afternoon of 6 July 1942, John Witherspoon was struck by a torpedo fired from the German submarine U-255, at 72°05′N 48°30′E. The torpedo struck her starboard side between holds #4 and #5. A minute later another torpedo struck beneath the bridge. All eight officers, 31 crewmen, and 11 Armed guards abandoned ship at this time, with one crewman falling overboard and drowning. At 16:55, another two torpedoes struck the port side amidships, this caused her to brake in two and sink within minutes. U-255 approached the lifeboats to question the captain, John Stewart Clark, about her cargo, afterwards offering food and water to the survivors and directions to the nearest land.

The merchant ship El Capitan, picked up 19 of the survivors on 8 July, with HMS La Malouine (K46) picking up the rest of survivors on 9 July. With El Capitan being attacked on 9 July, the survivors were once again forced to abandon ship, this time being rescued by HMS Lord Austin (FY220).

== Bibliography ==
- "Bethlehem-Fairfield, Baltimore MD". www.ShipbuildingHistory.com. 14 August 2008.
- Maritime Administration. "John Witherspoon". Ship History Database Vessel Status Card. U.S. Department of Transportation, Maritime Administration.
- Davies, James (May 2004). "Specifications (As-Built)" (PDF). p. 23.
- "SS John Witherspoon".
- "John Witherspoon".
- "El Capitan".
