= SS Francis L. Lee =

Liberty ship of WWII

History

United States
- Name: Francis L. Lee
- Namesake: Francis L. Lee
- Owner: War Shipping Administration (WSA)
- Operator: Seas Shipping Co., Inc.
- Ordered: as type (EC2-S-C1) hull, MCE hull 26
- Awarded: 14 March 1941
- Builder: Bethlehem-Fairfield Shipyard, Baltimore, Maryland
- Cost: $1,186,664
- Yard number: 2013
- Way number: 12
- Laid down: 13 October 1941
- Launched: 14 March 1942
- Sponsored by: Mrs. L.R. Sanford and Mrs. William C. Sealy
- Completed: 27 April 1942
- Identification: Call sign: KESO
- Fate: Sold for scrapping, 4 February 1965

General characteristics
- Class & type: Liberty ship; type EC2-S-C1, standard
- Tonnage: 10,865 LT DWT; 7,176 GRT
- Displacement: 3,380 long tons (3,434 t) (light); 14,245 long tons (14,474 t) (max)
- Length: 441 feet 6 inches (135 m) oa; 416 feet (127 m) pp; 427 feet (130 m) lwl
- Beam: 57 feet (17 m)
- Draft: 27 ft 9.25 in (8.4646 m)
- Installed power: 2 × Oil fired 450 °F (232 °C) boilers, operating at 220 psi (1,500 kPa); 2,500 hp (1,900 kW)
- Propulsion: 1 × triple-expansion steam engine, (manufactured by Worthington Pump & Machinery Corp, Harrison, New Jersey); 1 × screw propeller
- Speed: 11.5 knots (21.3 km/h; 13.2 mph)
- Capacity: 562,608 cubic feet (15,931 m^{3}) (grain); 499,573 cubic feet (14,146 m^{3}) (bale)
- Complement: 38–62 USMM; 21–40 USNAG
- Armament: Varied by ship; Bow-mounted 3-inch (76 mm)/50-caliber gun; Stern-mounted 4-inch (102 mm)/50-caliber gun; 2–8 × single 20-millimeter (0.79 in) Oerlikon anti-aircraft (AA) cannons and/or, 2–8 × 37-millimeter (1.46 in) M1 AA guns

SS Francis L. Lee was a Liberty ship built in the United States during World War II. She was named after Founding Father Francis L. Lee, a member of the House of Burgesses, in the Colony of Virginia. As an active protester regarding issues such as the Stamp Act, Lee helped move the colony in the direction of independence from Britain. Lee was a delegate to the Virginia Conventions and the Continental Congress. He was a signer of the Articles of Confederation and the United States Declaration of Independence as a representative of Virginia.

== Construction ==
Francis L. Lee was laid down on 13 October 1941, under a Maritime Commission (MARCOM) contract, MCE hull 26, by the Bethlehem-Fairfield Shipyard, Baltimore, Maryland; sponsored by Mrs. L.R. Sanford and Mrs. William C. Sealy, the wife and daughter of L.R. Sanford, the chief of the inspection section at the Bethlehem-Fairfield Shipyard, and was launched on 14 March 1942.

== History ==
She was allocated to Seas Shipping Co., Inc., on 27 April 1942. On 4 February 1947, she was laid up in the National Defense Reserve Fleet, Wilmington, North Carolina. She was sold for scrapping on 4 February 1965, to Norbo Trading Corp.

== Bibliography ==
- "Bethlehem-Fairfield, Baltimore MD". www.ShipbuildingHistory.com. 14 August 2008.
- Maritime Administration. "Francis L. Lee". Ship History Database Vessel Status Card. U.S. Department of Transportation, Maritime Administration.
- Davies, James (May 2004). "Specifications (As-Built)" (PDF). p. 23.
- "SS Francis L. Lee".
