= SS Gainesville Victory =

Victory ship of the United States

- Typical Victory Ship.

History

United States
- Name: Gainesville Victory
- Namesake: Gainesville, Florida
- Owner: War Shipping Administration
- Operator: Seas Shipping Company
- Builder: California Shipbuilding Company, Los Angeles
- Laid down: April 11, 1944
- Launched: June 9, 1944
- Completed: July 22, 1944
- Identification: IMO number: 5125336
- Fate: 1994 scrapped Alang, India

General characteristics
- Class & type: VC2-S-AP3 Victory ship
- Tonnage: 7,612 GRT, 4,553 NRT
- Displacement: 15,200 tons
- Length: 455 ft (139 m)
- Beam: 62 ft (19 m)
- Draft: 28 ft (8.5 m)
- Installed power: 8,500 shp (6,300 kW)
- Propulsion: HP & LP turbines geared to a single 20.5-foot (6.2 m) propeller
- Speed: 16.5 knots (30.6 km/h; 19.0 mph)
- Boats & landing craft carried: 4 lifeboats
- Complement: 62 Merchant Marine and 28 US Naval Armed Guards
- Armament: 1 × 5-inch (127 mm)/38 caliber gun; 1 × 3-inch (76 mm)/50 caliber gun; 8 × 20 mm Oerlikon

SS Gainesville Victory was the 22nd Victory ship built during World War II under the Emergency Shipbuilding program. She was launched by the California Shipbuilding Company on June 9, 1944, and completed on July 22, 1944. The ship’s United States Maritime Commission designation was VC2-S-AP3, hull number 22 (V-22). She was operated by the Seas Shipping Company. Gainesville Victory served in the Pacific Ocean during World War II. Gainesville Victory was number one of the new 10,500-ton class of ships, known as Victory ships. Victory ships were designed to replace the earlier Liberty ships. Liberty ships were designed to be used just for WW2, while Victory ships were designed to last longer and serve the US Navy after the war. The Victory ships differed from the Liberty ships in that they were faster, longer, wider, taller, had a thinner stack set further toward the superstructure, and had a long raised forecastle.

Gainesville Victory was christened by Mrs. Margaret Mansuy of Long Beach, California, the wife of Calshlp's acting comptroller, Frank Mansuy.

== World War II ==
Gainesville Victory steamed into the Pacific to bring supplies to the Pacific War troops. She took supplies for the Liberation of The Philippines and the Battle of Leyte from April 1 until April 6, 1945.

== War Relief and Seacowboys ==
From 1945 to 1947, the United Nations Relief and Rehabilitation Administration and the Brethren Service Committee of the Church of the Brethren sent livestock to war-torn countries. In 1942, the Church of the Brethren started a program called, Heifers for Relief project, which in 1953 became Heifer International. The SS Gainesville Victory was one of the ships known as a cowboy ship, because she moved livestock across the Atlantic Ocean. The Gainesville Victory moved horses, heifers, mules, chicks, rabbits, and goats. In February 1946, she arrived in Germany with livestock. This relief effort was also part of the Marshall Plan. She made three relief trips to Poland in 1946 and one trip to Czechoslovakia.

After the war and war relief in 1948, the Gainesville Victory was laid up in Beaumont, Texas, in the National Defense Reserve Fleet. A new war was starting in the Far East so she was then removed from the Reserve Fleet.

== Korean War ==
SS Gainesville Victory served as a merchant marine ship supplying goods for the Korean War. About 75 percent of the personnel taken to Korea for the Korean War came by the merchant marine ship. SS Gainesville Victory transported goods, mail, food and other supplies. About 90 percent of the cargo was moved by merchant marine naval to the war zone. SS Gainesville Victory made trips between November 18, 1950, and December 23, 1952, aiding American forces engaged against Communist aggression in South Korea. Gainesville Victory made eighteen trips to Korea. Gainesville Victory participated in the Hungnam redeployment and took supplies to Pusan.

== Vietnam War ==
Gainesville Victory was reactivated again as part of the buildup of naval forces for the Vietnam War. She was operated by the States Marine Line as a United States Merchant Marine ship. On August 1, 1965, the Gainesville Victory was removed from the National Defense Reserve Fleet at the James River. She was moved to the Norfolk, Virginia, and dry-docked for repair. In 1967, she was operated by the States Marine Lines. On 1 February 1966, while returning from Vietnam, the Gainesville Victory came to the aid of a distress call northwest of the Hawaiian Islands. The seas were stormy, and the SS Rockport, a Liberian-registry freighter, was foundering. While firing a rescue line to the Rockport, one of the Gainesville Victory crew was injured. The USNS General Walker also came to help in the rescue. All 27 men on the Rockport were removed from the sinking ship.

In 1994, Gainesville Victory was scrapped at Alang, India.

== See also ==
- List of Victory ships
- Liberty ship
- Type C1 ship
- Type C2 ship
- Type C3 ship

== Sources ==
- Sawyer, L.A. and W.H. Mitchell. Victory ships and tankers: The history of the ‘Victory’ type cargo ships and of the tankers built in the United States of America during World War II, Cornell Maritime Press, 1974, 0-87033-182-5.
- United States Maritime Commission:
- Victory Cargo Ships
