= SS Negley D. Cochran =

Liberty ship of WWII

History

United States
- Name: Negley D. Cochran
- Namesake: Negley D. Cochran
- Owner: War Shipping Administration (WSA)
- Operator: Smith & Johnson Co.
- Ordered: as type (EC2-S-C1) hull, MC hull 2492
- Awarded: 23 April 1943
- Builder: St. Johns River Shipbuilding Company, Jacksonville, Florida
- Cost: $1,065,039
- Yard number: 56
- Way number: 2
- Laid down: 19 July 1944
- Launched: 29 August 1944
- Sponsored by: Mrs. Abraham Hurwitz
- Completed: 10 September 1944
- Identification: Call sign: KSSX
- Fate: Sold for commercial use, 6 February 1947

United States
- Name: Negley D. Cochran
- Owner: States Marine Corp.
- Fate: Sold, 12 August 1947

Panama
- Name: Global Trader
- Owner: Global Transport, Ltd.
- Fate: Sold, 1947

Norway
- Name: Surna
- Owner: Skibs A/S
- Operator: Gorrissen & Co. (1947-1958); Torvald Klaveness Rederi A/S (1958-1959)
- Fate: Sold, 1959

Liberia
- Name: Maringa
- Owner: Namdal Shipping & Trading Co.
- Operator: Carl Aune & Cia
- Fate: Sold, 1960

Brazil
- Name: Maringa
- Owner: Companhia Nav.e Comercio Pan-Americana
- Fate: Sank off Brazil, 16 June 1969

General characteristics
- Class & type: Liberty ship; type EC2-S-C1, standard
- Tonnage: 10,865 LT DWT; 7,176 GRT
- Displacement: 3,380 long tons (3,434 t) (light); 14,245 long tons (14,474 t) (max)
- Length: 441 feet 6 inches (135 m) oa; 416 feet (127 m) pp; 427 feet (130 m) lwl
- Beam: 57 feet (17 m)
- Draft: 27 ft 9.25 in (8.4646 m)
- Installed power: 2 × Oil fired 450 °F (232 °C) boilers, operating at 220 psi (1,500 kPa); 2,500 hp (1,900 kW)
- Propulsion: 1 × triple-expansion steam engine, (manufactured by General Machinery Corp., Hamilton, Ohio); 1 × screw propeller
- Speed: 11.5 knots (21.3 km/h; 13.2 mph)
- Capacity: 562,608 cubic feet (15,931 m^{3}) (grain); 499,573 cubic feet (14,146 m^{3}) (bale)
- Complement: 38–62 USMM; 21–40 USNAG
- Armament: Varied by ship; Bow-mounted 3-inch (76 mm)/50-caliber gun; Stern-mounted 4-inch (102 mm)/50-caliber gun; 2–8 × single 20-millimeter (0.79 in) Oerlikon anti-aircraft (AA) cannons and/or, 2–8 × 37-millimeter (1.46 in) M1 AA guns

SS Negley D. Cochran was a Liberty ship built in the United States during World War II. She was named after Negley D. Cochran, an American newspaper editor and owner of The Toledo Bee newspaper.

== Construction ==
Negley D. Cochran was laid down on 19 July 1944, under a Maritime Commission (MARCOM) contract, MC hull 2492, by the St. Johns River Shipbuilding Company, Jacksonville, Florida; she was sponsored by Mrs. Abraham Hurwitz, the wife of the editor of the Jacksonville Journal, and was launched on 29 August 1944.

== History ==
She was allocated to the Smith & Johnson Co., on 10 September 1944. She was sold for commercial use, 6 February 1946, to States Marine Corp., for $558,923.86. After several owner and name changes, on 16 June 1969, named Maringa, she sank off of Brazil at 11°30′S 37°15′W.

== Bibliography ==
- "St. John's River Shipbuilding, Jacksonville FL". www.ShipbuildingHistory.com. 16 October 2010.
- Maritime Administration. "Negley D. Cochran". Ship History Database Vessel Status Card. U.S. Department of Transportation, Maritime Administration.
- Davies, James (May 2004). "Specifications (As-Built)" (PDF). p. 23.
- "SS Negley D. Cochran".
- "Negley D. Cochran USS (1944~1947) Maringa SS (+1969)". 3 November 2014.
