= SS Noah Brown =

Liberty ship of WWII

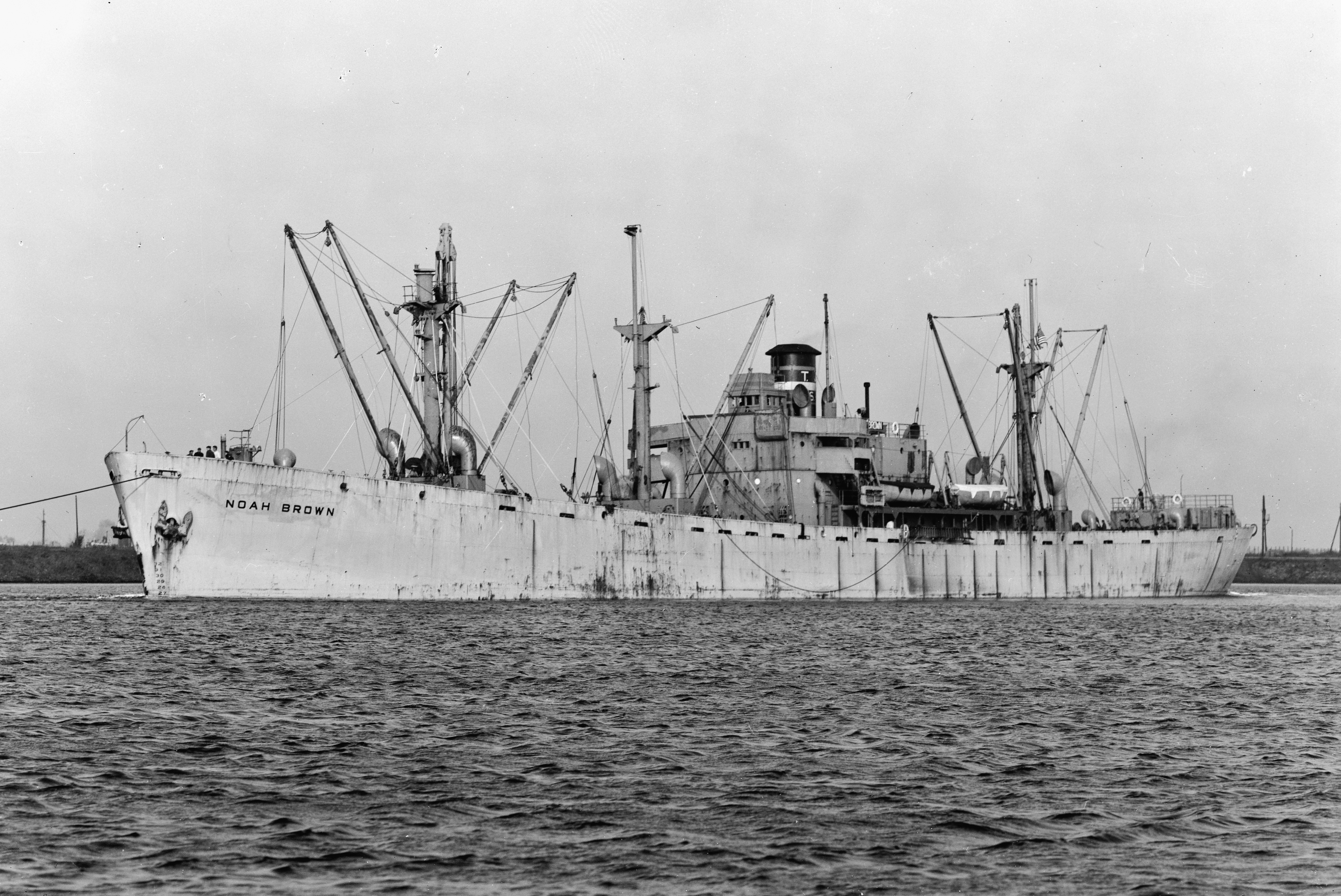
- Noah Brown in Antwerp

History

United States
- Name: Noah Brown
- Namesake: Noah Brown
- Owner: War Shipping Administration (WSA)
- Operator: Seas Shipping Co., Inc.
- Port of registry: Jacksonville
- Ordered: as type (EC2-S-C1) hull, MC hull 2481
- Awarded: 23 April 1943
- Builder: St. Johns River Shipbuilding Company, Jacksonville, Florida
- Cost: $1,192,596
- Yard number: 45
- Way number: 3
- Laid down: 28 April 1944
- Launched: 8 June 1944
- Completed: 28 June 1944
- Identification: US official number 245799; IMO number: 5182657; Call sign: WQFK
- Fate: Sold for commercial use, 8 October 1947

United States
- Name: Noah Brown (1947–1949); Henry Stevenson (1949–1955)
- Owner: Bulk Carriers Corp.
- Fate: Sold, 24 December 1954

Liberia
- Name: Aldershot
- Owner: Aldershot Steamship Corp.
- Operator: Ocean Freighting & Brokerage Corp.
- Fate: Sold, May 1960

Greece
- Name: Karolina
- Owner: Regina Steamship Corp.
- Operator: Ocean Freighting & Brokerage Corp.
- Fate: Sold, 31 October 1963

Liberia
- Name: Vrontados Pioneer
- Owner: Adriatic Maritime Co.
- Operator: Pacific Steamship Agency
- Fate: Sold, 1966

Liberia
- Name: Vrontados Pioneer
- Owner: Cosmic Freighters Ltd
- Operator: Pacific Steamship Agency
- Fate: Scrapped in Gandia, September 1969

General characteristics
- Class & type: Liberty ship; type EC2-S-C1, standard
- Tonnage: 10,865 LT DWT; 7,176 GRT
- Displacement: 3,380 long tons (3,434 t) (light); 14,245 long tons (14,474 t) (max)
- Length: 441 feet 6 inches (135 m) oa; 416 feet (127 m) pp; 427 feet (130 m) lwl
- Beam: 57 feet (17 m)
- Draft: 27 ft 9.25 in (8.4646 m)
- Installed power: 2 × Oil fired 450 °F (232 °C) boilers, operating at 220 psi (1,500 kPa); 2,500 hp (1,900 kW)
- Propulsion: 1 × triple-expansion steam engine, (manufactured by Joshua Hendy Iron Works, Sunnyvale, California); 1 × screw propeller
- Speed: 11.5 knots (21.3 km/h; 13.2 mph)
- Capacity: 562,608 cubic feet (15,931 m^{3}) (grain); 499,573 cubic feet (14,146 m^{3}) (bale)
- Complement: 38–62 USMM; 21–40 USNAG
- Armament: Varied by ship; Bow-mounted 3-inch (76 mm)/50-caliber gun; Stern-mounted 4-inch (102 mm)/50-caliber gun; 2–8 × single 20-millimeter (0.79 in) Oerlikon anti-aircraft (AA) cannons and/or, 2–8 × 37-millimeter (1.46 in) M1 AA guns

SS Noah Brown was a Liberty ship built in the United States during World War II. She was named after Noah Brown, an American shipbuilder, based in New York City, founded a company, along with his brother Adam, which was active between 1804 and 1833. They built several notable vessels, including Robert Fulton's Demologos, the first steam-powered warship, and numerous naval vessels on Lake Erie and Lake Champlain, during the War of 1812.

== Construction ==
Noah Brown was laid down on 28 April 1944, under a Maritime Commission (MARCOM) contract, MC hull 2481, by the St. Johns River Shipbuilding Company, Jacksonville, Florida; and was launched on 8 June 1944.

== History ==
She was allocated to the Seas Shipping Co., Inc., on 28 June 1944. She was sold for commercial use, 8 October 1947, to Bulk Carriers Corp. After several name and owner changes she was scrapped in Gandia, Spain, in 1969.

== Bibliography ==
- "St. John's River Shipbuilding, Jacksonville FL". www.ShipbuildingHistory.com. 16 October 2010.
- Maritime Administration. "Noah Brown". Ship History Database Vessel Status Card. U.S. Department of Transportation, Maritime Administration.
- Davies, James (May 2004). "Specifications (As-Built)" (PDF). p. 23.
- "SS Noah Brown".
