= USS Caribou =

History

United States
- Name: Nathaniel B. Palmer; Caribou
- Namesake: Nathaniel Palmer; The caribou
- Launched: 2 November 1943
- Commissioned: 25 November 1943
- Decommissioned: 3 May 1946
- Honors and awards: 1 battle star
- Fate: Sold

General characteristics
- Class & type: Armadillo-class tanker
- Displacement: 3665 tons
- Length: 441 feet 6 inches
- Beam: 56 feet 11 inches
- Draft: 28 feet 4 inches
- Speed: 11 knots (20 km/h; 13 mph)
- Complement: 79 officers and men
- Armament: 1 × 5-inch 38 caliber dual-purpose gun; 1 × 3 in (76 mm) gun; 8 × 20 mm cannons

USS Caribou (IX-114), an Armadillo-class tanker designated an unclassified miscellaneous vessel, was the only ship of the United States Navy to be named for the caribou. Her keel was laid down by the California Shipbuilding Corporation, in Wilmington, California, as Nathaniel B. Palmer under a Maritime Commission contract. She was launched on 2 November 1943 sponsored by Mrs. T. A. Gregory, acquired by the Navy on 25 November 1943 and commissioned the same day and reported to the Pacific Fleet.

Caribou stood out of Pearl Harbor on 10 February 1944 for Kwajalein and Eniwetok, where she served as station tanker until August, providing rear echelon support for the Fifth Fleet. Moving on to Manus, Caribou based there while fueling units at sea in support of operations in the Philippines until March 1945. From May through July, she resumed station duty, this time at Mindoro, Manila, and Tacloban, closer to the swiftly moving American advance. Sailing to Ulithi, she carried oil to Leyte, then made a similar voyage to Guam. Caribou served from August to December in the Mariana Islands and at Iwo Jima.

On 2 December 1945, Caribou cleared Guam for Norfolk, Virginia. There she was decommissioned on 3 May 1946, and delivered to the War Shipping Administration for sale 6 May 1946.
