= SS Nicholas Biddle =

Liberty ship of WWII

History

United States
- Name: Nicholas Biddle
- Namesake: Nicholas Biddle
- Owner: War Shipping Administration (WSA)
- Operator: International Freighting Corp.
- Ordered: as type (EC2-S-C1) hull, MCE hull 917
- Awarded: 1 January 1942
- Builder: Bethlehem-Fairfield Shipyard, Baltimore, Maryland
- Cost: $1,045,728
- Yard number: 2067
- Way number: 7
- Laid down: 11 August 1942
- Launched: 22 September 1942
- Sponsored by: Mrs. R.E. Anderson
- Completed: 30 September 1942
- Identification: Call sign: KHNT
- Fate: Laid up in the National Defense Reserve Fleet, Beaumont, Texas, 18 June 1948; Sold for scrapping, 15 March 1962, withdrawn from fleet, 3 April 1962

General characteristics
- Class & type: Liberty ship; type EC2-S-C1, standard
- Tonnage: 10,865 LT DWT; 7,176 GRT
- Displacement: 3,380 long tons (3,434 t) (light); 14,245 long tons (14,474 t) (max)
- Length: 441 feet 6 inches (135 m) oa; 416 feet (127 m) pp; 427 feet (130 m) lwl
- Beam: 57 feet (17 m)
- Draft: 27 ft 9.25 in (8.4646 m)
- Installed power: 2 × Oil fired 450 °F (232 °C) boilers, operating at 220 psi (1,500 kPa); 2,500 hp (1,900 kW)
- Propulsion: 1 × triple-expansion steam engine, (manufactured by Worthington Pump & Machinery Corp, Harrison, New Jersey); 1 × screw propeller
- Speed: 11.5 knots (21.3 km/h; 13.2 mph)
- Capacity: 562,608 cubic feet (15,931 m^{3}) (grain); 499,573 cubic feet (14,146 m^{3}) (bale)
- Complement: 38–62 USMM; 21–40 USNAG
- Armament: Varied by ship; Bow-mounted 3-inch (76 mm)/50-caliber gun; Stern-mounted 4-inch (102 mm)/50-caliber gun; 2–8 × single 20-millimeter (0.79 in) Oerlikon anti-aircraft (AA) cannons and/or, 2–8 × 37-millimeter (1.46 in) M1 AA guns

SS Nicholas Biddle was a Liberty ship built in the United States during World War II. She was named after Nicholas Biddle, an American financier who served as the third and last president of the Second Bank of the United States. He also served in the Pennsylvania General Assembly. He is best known for his role in the Bank War.

== Construction ==
Nicholas Biddle was laid down on 11 August 1942, under a Maritime Commission (MARCOM) contract, MCE hull 917, by the Bethlehem-Fairfield Shipyard, Baltimore, Maryland; she was sponsored by Mrs. R.E. Anderson, the wife of MARCOM's director of finance, and was launched on 22 September 1942.

== History ==
She was allocated to Seas Shipping Co., Inc., on 30 September 1942. On 15 December 1948, she was laid up in the National Defense Reserve Fleet, Beaumont, Texas. On 15 March 1962, she was sold for scrapping to Commercial Metals Co., for $52,444.44. She was removed from the fleet on 3 April 1962.

== Bibliography ==
- "Bethlehem-Fairfield, Baltimore MD". www.ShipbuildingHistory.com. 14 August 2008.
- Maritime Administration. "Nicholas Biddle". Ship History Database Vessel Status Card. U.S. Department of Transportation, Maritime Administration.
- Davies, James (May 2004). "Specifications (As-Built)" (PDF). p. 23.
- "SS Nicholas Biddle".
