= John Will =

John Will may refer to:

- John Will (fighter) (born 1957), martial artist from Australia
- John George Will (1892–1917), Scottish rugby union player and Royal Flying Corps officer
- John Shiress Will (1840–1910), British legal writer and politician
- John M. Will (1899–1981), American naval officer
