= Texas Clipper =

Merchant marine training vessel with the Texas Maritime Academy

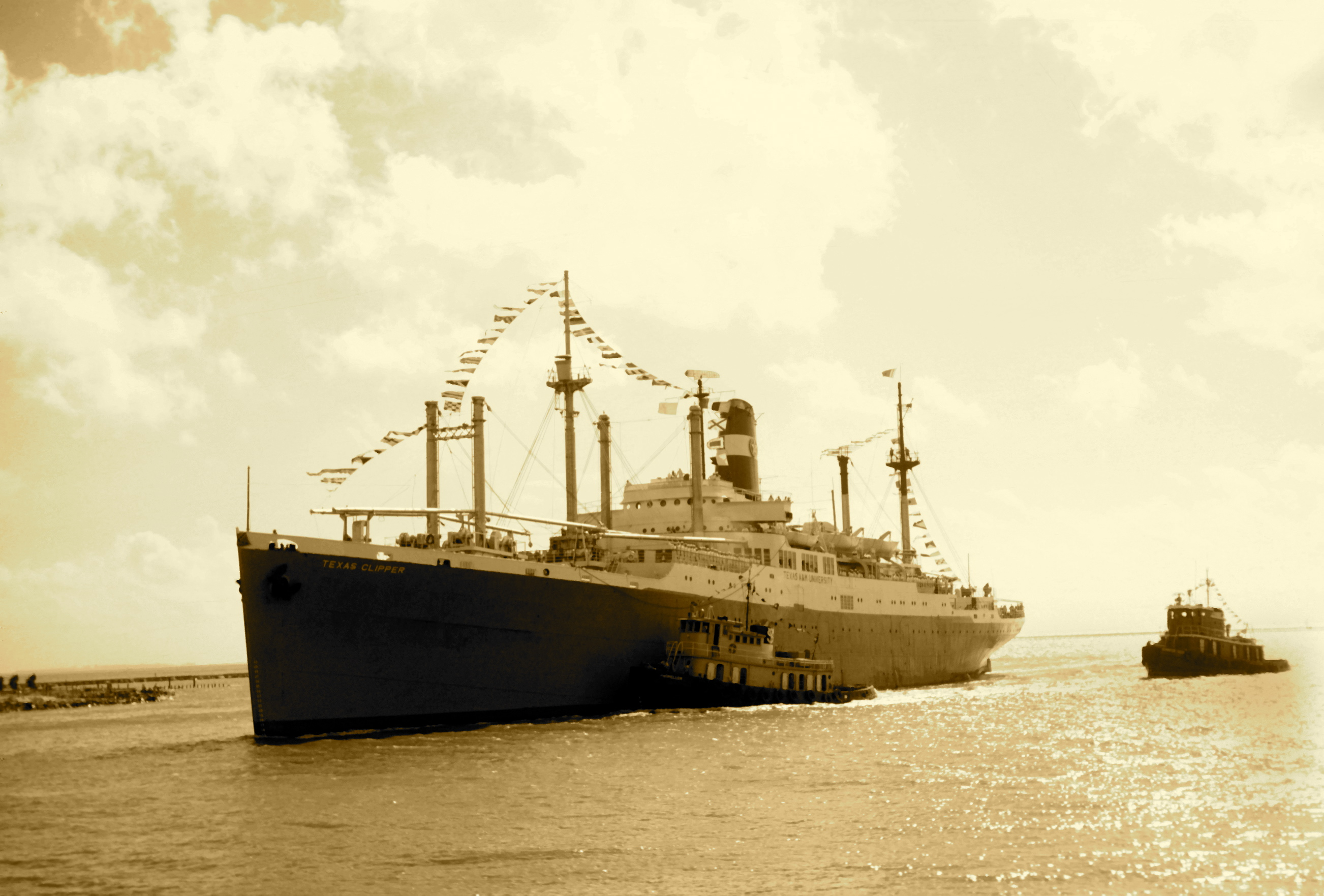
- Texas Clipper, Texas A&M Maritime Academy, ca. June 1968

History

United States
- Name: USTS Texas Clipper
- Namesake: A clipper ship
- Builder: Bethlehem-Sparrows Point Shipyard, Maryland 1944
- Laid down: 2 March 1944
- Launched: 12 September 1944
- Christened: USS Queens (APA-103)
- Acquired: 1965
- Renamed: Excambion, USTS Texas Clipper
- Identification: IMO number: 5110616
- Fate: Sunk as an artificial reef off Texas, 17 November 2007
- Notes: Ship ran on Bunker C Fuel Oil and consumed approximately 0.8 barrels per mile. It has a Contra-Guide rudder

General characteristics
- Tonnage: 9644 Gross Tons
- Displacement: 7,627 tons (light), 14,900 tons. (fully loaded)
- Length: 473 ft 1 in (144.19 meters)
- Beam: 66 ft 5.5 inches (20.26 meters)
- Draft: 25 ft (7,62 meters)
- Propulsion: Bethlehem geared turbine drive, 2 × Babcock & Wilcox 500 psi, 750 degF header-type boilers, single 4 blade 19' x 20' propeller, designed shaft horsepower 8,000 at 96 rpm
- Speed: 17.6 knots
- Range: 11,812 NM w/ 25% reserve
- Complement: 256 persons
- Notes: MCV Hull No. 1677, hull type C3-S-A3

USTS Texas Clipper, a 473 foot long ship, served as a merchant marine training vessel with the Texas Maritime Academy at Texas A&M University at Galveston for 30 years beginning in 1965. Her name is reflective of clipper ships of old, both designed with a characteristic rounded stern.

Prior to her service as a training vessel, Texas Clipper had served in World War II as an attack transport vessel named USS Queens. Following the war, in 1948, Queens was converted into the trans-atlantic ocean-liner SS Excambion, a member of the quartet of ships referred to as the post-war "4 Aces" for American Export Lines. Excambion carried passengers and cargo on a regular sailing route from New York to various Mediterranean ports.

Following service as a training ship, the Texas Clipper I was moored at the Beaumont Reserve Fleet from 1996 to 2006. In 2006, Texas Clipper was transferred to the Texas Parks and Wildlife Department (TPWD) Artificial Reef Program to be turned into an artificial reef. This transfer allowed the ship to not be scrapped.

== History ==
The Texas Clipper was initially used by the US military in World War II as a troop transport vessel USS Queens. During the 1950s, the ship was converted to a commercial ocean liner carrying passengers, principally across the Atlantic, but also with trips to Pacific. The ship subsequently became a training vessel for maritime cadets.

Texas Clipper was launched in September 1944, and used in the latter stages of World War II as an attack transport vessel named USS Queens.

In 1948, Queens was converted into the trans-atlantic ocean-liner SS Excambion, a member of the quartet of ships referred to as "4 Aces" operated by American Export Lines. Excambion carried passengers and cargo on a regular sailing route from New York to various Mediterranean ports.

SS Excambion was the site of a major scandal in 1957 in Marseille when the ship was found to be carrying 20 kg of heroin for the French Connection.

Before the demolition process began in the 2000s to prepare the ship for sinking as an artificial reef, a large 11-panel mural by Saul Steinberg was discovered inside the ship. Created for the ship's conversion from attack transport USS Queens to cargo liner Excambion, it was serendipitously discovered beneath wallpaper above the bar in the ship's aft lounge. Saul Steinberg, a cartoonist and illustrator, well known for his many "New Yorker" magazine cover drawings, created the large murals for Texas Clipper and the other "4 Aces" ships. Texas Clipper was the subject of a Texas Parks and Wildlife Department video that provided an account of the mural's discovery prior to sinking the ship as an artificial reef off Brownsville, Texas. When asked to estimate the value of unusually large (22 ft.) mural, — according to Dale Shively, Artificial Reef Coordinator for Texas Parks and Wildlife — the Steinberg Foundation responded, "not millions of dollars, but it's probably at least six figures". The mural was removed for restoration and preservation.

== Artificial reef ==
While being prepared from November 2006 to early November 2007 to become an artificial reef, Texas Clipper was docked at the Port of Brownsville for cleaning of hazardous materials, and modifications for marine life and diver safety. The conversion, cleanup and sinking cost over 4 million dollars. The Texas Clipper was sunk on November 17, 2007, approximately 17 nautical miles (31 km) northeast of South Padre Island, TX. It was placed in 132 feet (40 m) of water. The top of the ship has reached depths as shallow as 50 feet (15 m).

The TPWD used careful consideration during the conversion of the ship into an artificial reef to preserve the ship's appearance. All masts and kingposts that were cut to meet Coast Guard clearance requirements being secured to the deck of the ship to add interest for divers and increase complexity for wildlife.

At 473 feet (144 m) in length, Texas Clipper was one of the largest vessels (in 2006) serving as an artificial reef off Texas. The SS V. A. Fogg, which sank during a mishap off Freeport, Texas, was 570 feet (174 m) in length. Twelve other World War II era ships are also part of the TPWD Artificial Reef Program.

Unfortunately, when it hit the ocean floor the vessel tipped onto its side, blocking access to its interior for fish and divers. Texas Parks and Wildlife Department spokesman Aaron Reed said it was unclear what caused the ship to tip. He said the state might ask the company that prepared the ship for its sinking to correct its position. The sinking of the ship cost the state about US$4 million.

The Texas Clipper (midship) rests at Lat. 26° 11' 24.695"N Lon. 96° 51' 40.238"W.

== See also ==
- SS Stevens, the former SS Exochorda and sister ship to Texas Clipper
