= Mark Mahalingam Baskaran =

Environmental scientist

Mark M. Baskaran
- Born: 1956 (age 69–70); Watrap, Tamil Nadu, India
- Education: Madurai Kamaraj University (M.Sc); Virudhunagar Hindu Nadars’ Senthikumara Nadar College (B.Sc)
- Known for: Use of short-lived radionuclides as biogeochemical tracers and chronometers
- Awards: Fellow of the American Association for the Advancement of Science (2024); Senior Fulbright U.S. Scholar (2015)
- Scientific career
- Fields: Isotope geochemistry Environmental science
- Workplaces: Wayne State University; Texas A&M University at Galveston; University of Alaska Fairbanks; Physical Research Laboratory
- Doctoral advisor: B.L.K. Somayajulu

Mark Mahalingam Baskaran (born 1956) is a professor in the Department of Environmental Science and Geology at Wayne State University in Detroit, Michigan. He is known for his contributions to low-temperature isotope geochemistry, particularly for developing and refining the use of short-lived radionuclides as biogeochemical tracers and chronometers.

== Biography ==
Mark Baskaran was born in Watrap (Wathirairrupu), Tamil Nadu, India, in 1956. He received his Bachelor of Science in physics in 1977 from Virudhunagar Hindu Nadars’ Senthikumara Nadar College, where he was the class valedictorian and received a Gold Medal. In 1979, he earned his Master of Science in physics from Madurai-Kamaraj University, receiving the First Rank Prize Medal.

Baskaran pursued his doctoral work at the Physical Research Laboratory (PRL) in Ahmedabad, beginning in 1979. He was awarded his Ph.D. in 1985 under the supervision of Bhamidipati Lakshmidhara Kanakadri Somayajulu. He remained at PRL for two years as a postdoctoral fellow before joining the University of Alaska Fairbanks as a postdoc.

In 1988, Baskaran joined Texas A&M University at Galveston as a non-tenure track faculty member, where he worked for ten years as a Senior Lecturer and Research Scientist. He moved to Wayne State University's Department of Geology in 1999 as a Senior Lecturer. He was promoted to a tenure-track Associate Professor position in 2000, granted tenure in 2004, and became a Full Professor in 2007. He served as Chair of the Department of Environmental Science and Geology at Wayne State University for 6 years (2018-2024).

He has delivered plenary and keynote seminars at international conferences in eight countries and has given invited seminars at over 38 universities and research institutions globally. As of March 2026, his work has been cited over 12,137 times, and he has an h-index of 64. He has published 161 peer-reviewed research articles.
