= USS Queens =

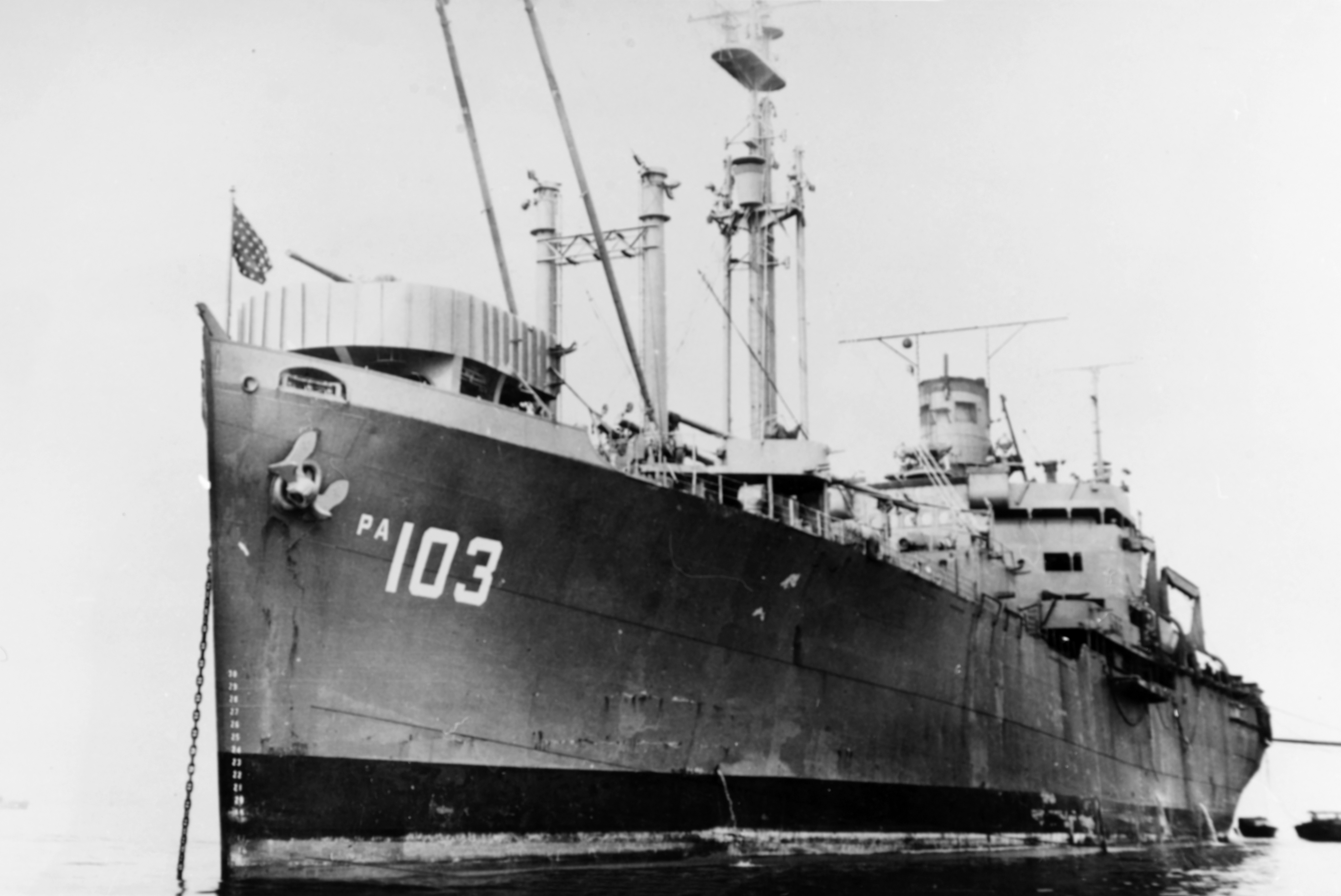
- USS Queens (APA-103) at anchor, c. 1945

History

United States
- Name: USS Queens (APA-103)
- Namesake: Queens, New York City
- Builder: Bethlehem Steel
- Laid down: 2 March 1944
- Launched: 12 September 1944
- Sponsored by: Miss Jeanne L Fogle
- Acquired: 16 December 1944
- Commissioned: 16 December 1944
- Decommissioned: 10 June 1946
- Stricken: 19 June 1946
- Fate: Sunk as an artificial reef off Texas, 17 November 2007 as Texas Clipper

General characteristics
- Class & type: Windsor-class attack transport
- Displacement: 7,970 tons (lt), 13,143 t. (fl)
- Length: 473 ft 1 in (144.20 m)
- Beam: 66 ft (20 m)
- Draft: 25 ft (7.6 m)
- Propulsion: Bethlehem geared turbine drive, 2 × Babcock & Wilcox header-type boilers, single propeller, designed shaft horsepower 8,000
- Speed: 17 knots
- Capacity: Troops: Officer 94 Enlisted 1,463; Cargo: 150,000 cu ft, 1,600 tons
- Complement: Officer 42 Enlisted 434
- Armament: 1 × 5"/38 caliber dual-purpose gun mounts, 2 × Bofors 40mm gun mounts, 2 × twin 20mm gun mounts, 18 × single 20mm gun mounts
- Notes: MCV Hull No. 1677, hull type C3-S-A3

USS Queens (APA-103) was a Windsor-class attack transport that served with the US Navy during World War II. She was commissioned late in the war and initially assigned to transport duties; consequently she did not take part in any combat operations.

Queens was named after Queens, a borough in New York City. She was laid down 2 March 1944 by Bethlehem Steel at Sparrows Point, Maryland; launched 12 September 1944; acquired by the Navy from the Maritime Commission on loan charter 16 December 1944; and commissioned 16 December 1944.

== World War II ==
Following shakedown and amphibious training in Chesapeake Bay, Queens reported for duty at Queens, New York, to Commander, Task Force 29, 15 January 1945. Sailing via Norfolk, Virginia and the Panama Canal, she arrived Pearl Harbor 7 February. After training, she departed Pearl Harbor 2 March, carrying 1,250 Army and Navy troops.

Arriving via Eniwetok, she debarked troops at Iwo Jima 26 March. She began medical treatment for Iwo Jima casualties 30 March. Departing Iwo Jima 12 April with 1,500 Marines, she proceeded via Guam, Eniwetok and Pearl Harbor to Hilo, Hawaii, where she debarked troops 25 April.

Following amphibious training, she left Pearl Harbor for San Francisco 23 May, and proceeded to Everett, Washington, for repairs. Sailing back to action via Pearl Harbor, she delivered troops and cargo to Saipan 11 July. After steaming non-stop from Saipan to San Francisco, arriving 25 July, she delivered troops to Pearl Harbor 11 August.

=== After hostilities ===
Loaded with 5th Amphibious personnel, she debarked occupation troops at Sasebo, Japan, 22 September, and then embarked Army infantrymen in the Philippines, before returning to the United States.

=== Decommission ===
Assigned to inactive status in September 1945, Queens arrived Norfolk on 29 April 1946, decommissioned 10 June, and was redelivered to the War Shipping Administration 11 June. She was struck from the Naval Vessel Register 19 June 1946.

== Postwar career ==
Queens was converted to Maritime Commission hull type P1-S1-DR1 in November 1947. She was purchased by American Export Lines, 22 November 1948 and renamed Excambion. On 17 March 1959, Excambion was returned to the Maritime Administration under a trade-in program. She was then laid up in the National Defense Reserve Fleet, Hudson River Group from 20 April 1959.

The ship was loaned to the Texas Maritime Academy 26 April 1965, for service as a merchant marine officer training ship and renamed USTS Texas Clipper. She continued serving in this role for the next thirty years, until being sunk as an artificial reef on 17 November 2007, seventeen miles off South Padre Island, Texas.
