= TS General Rudder =

US Navy ship used for training

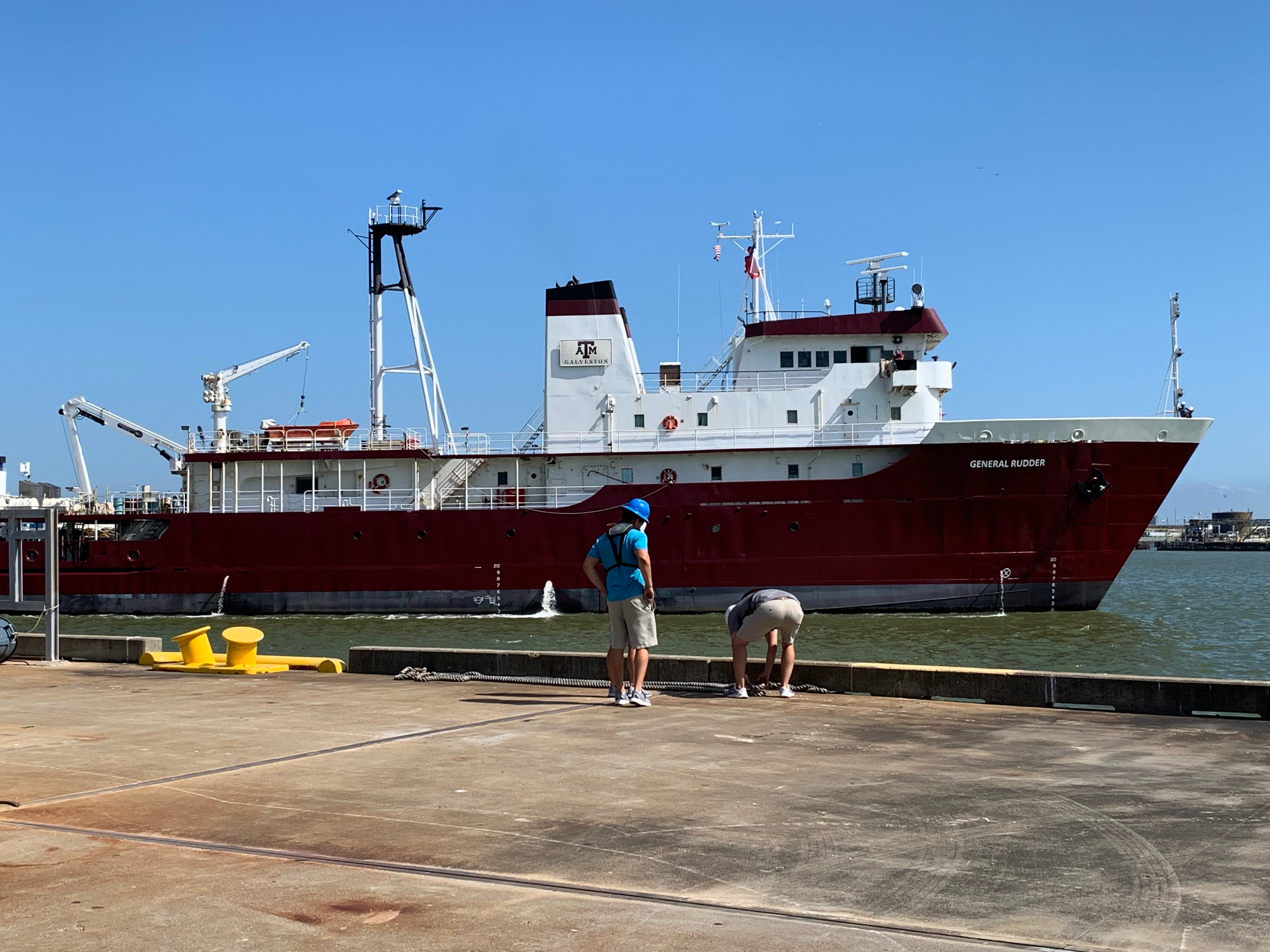
- TS General Rudder on approach to Texas A&M Maritime Academy, 2019

History

United States
- Name: USNS Contender (T-AGOS-2)
- Operator: USNS
- Ordered: September 26, 1980
- Builder: Tacoma Boatbuilding Company, Tacoma, Washington
- Laid down: January 10, 1983
- Launched: December 20, 1983
- Sponsored by: Mrs. Sarah Sumner Rowden
- Acquired: June 9, 1984
- Stricken: December 11, 1992
- Fate: Disposed of by title transfer to MARAD on October 1, 1992
- Status: Converted into training vessel TV Kings Pointer for the US Merchant Marine Academy and later renamed/refitted as TS General Rudder

United States
- Name: T/V Kings Pointer
- Owner: United States Maritime Administration
- Operator: United States Merchant Marine Academy
- Acquired: 1992
- In service: 1992-2012
- Home port: Kings Point, New York
- Fate: Transferred to Texas A&M Maritime Academy

United States
- Name: T/V General Rudder
- Owner: United States Maritime Administration
- Operator: Texas A&M University at Galveston
- Acquired: 2012
- In service: 2012-2019
- Home port: Galveston, Texas
- Identification: IMO number: 8835463; MMSI number: 367604000; Callsign: WTAU
- Status: Laid up

General characteristics
- Class & type: Training Vessel
- Tonnage: 1,914 GT;574 NT
- Displacement: 2,285 tons (at design draft)
- Length: 224 ft (68 m)
- Beam: 43 ft (13 m)
- Height: 71 ft (22 m)
- Draft: 16.0 ft (4.9 m)
- Ice class: ABS Class C0
- Installed power: 4x Caterpillar D398TA Generators; 2x General Electric Motors; 1600 hp
- Propulsion: 2x Four-blade propellers; 8' diameter; 8.5° pitch; 1x General Electric 550hp tunnel; fixed-pitch
- Speed: 12 knots
- Capacity: 228,615 gallons diesel (98% capacity)
- Crew: 64

TS General Rudder was the primary training vessel of Texas A&M Maritime Academy. In operation with Texas A&M from 2012 to 2023, it originated as the USNS Contender (T-AGOS-2), a Stalwart-class Modified Tactical Auxiliary General Ocean Surveillance Ship of the United States Navy. It also served as the flagship of the United States Merchant Marine Academy training fleet from 1992 to 2012. As of December 2024, the ship was berthed at the Beaumont Reserve Fleet in Beaumont, Texas.

== History ==
Stalwart-class ships were originally designed to collect underwater acoustical data in support of Cold War antisubmarine warfare operations in the 1980s. These vessels were designed to create minimal noise while operating. The addition of cavitation-free propellers at speeds under three knots, the absence of reduction gears in the propulsion system, sound isolation of diesel generators, and vibration dampening of all machinery helped in the Contender's mission as an acoustical data sounder.

In 1992, the ex-Contender became the T/V Kings Pointer, the flagship and training vessel of the United States Merchant Marine Academy. In 1999, Kings Pointer was the first vessel to reach the site of the crash of EgyptAir Flight 990. In the spring of 2004, she underwent a major overhaul to upgrade her crew's quarters and training equipment. The aft 'tow' deck was also modified and any vestige of her previous employment as a SURTASS ship was removed and reworked. She remained the flagship and training ship of the United States Merchant Marine Academy until January 2012.

The ship was then transferred to Texas A&M University at Galveston and renamed the "TS General Rudder" (after General James Earl Rudder), where she remains today as the primary training vessel for cadets of the Texas A&M Maritime Academy. In 2013, the vessel had another major overhaul, with the aft fantail's bulwark lowered, aft main deck leveled, and hull cleaned and repainted. The vessel was also fitted with additional berthing for 64 personnel. In 2019, the ship underwent another overhaul, with engine-room improvements, steel repair, rust removal, and the hull cleaned and repainted. This maintenance session came with eagerness, after months of technical and mechanical issues had plagued the vessel. For the first time since being transferred to Texas A&M Maritime Academy, the ship was given a maroon-and-white paint scheme, indicative of Texas A&M school colors. The new improvements have seen promising results for the aging training vessel, as she reached a maximum speed of 14 knots while in transit from her Mobile shipyard. In June 2019, the TS General Rudder had another underway period before being transferred to the Beaumont Ready Reserve Fleet later that summer.

== Incidents ==
In September 2018, the TS General Rudder suffered a rudder failure while entering Port Arthur. The vessel was unable to lower anchor and purposely ran aground minutes later to avoid a collision with other ship traffic. With the help of the US Coast Guard and local tug boats, the General Rudder was towed to a local shipyard for repairs. Although the vessel's rudder stock had not previously shown signs of wear, it was apparent in the crew's inspection that the heat of the shifting rudder had forced the stock to seize in its casing, causing the unexpected rudder malfunction. The issue was corrected, and the vessel returned to Texas A&M Maritime Academy two weeks later.

== Gallery ==
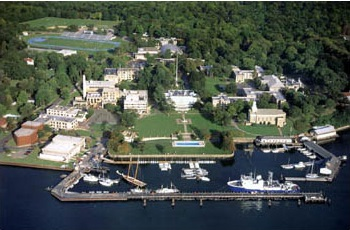
USMMA with Kings Pointer

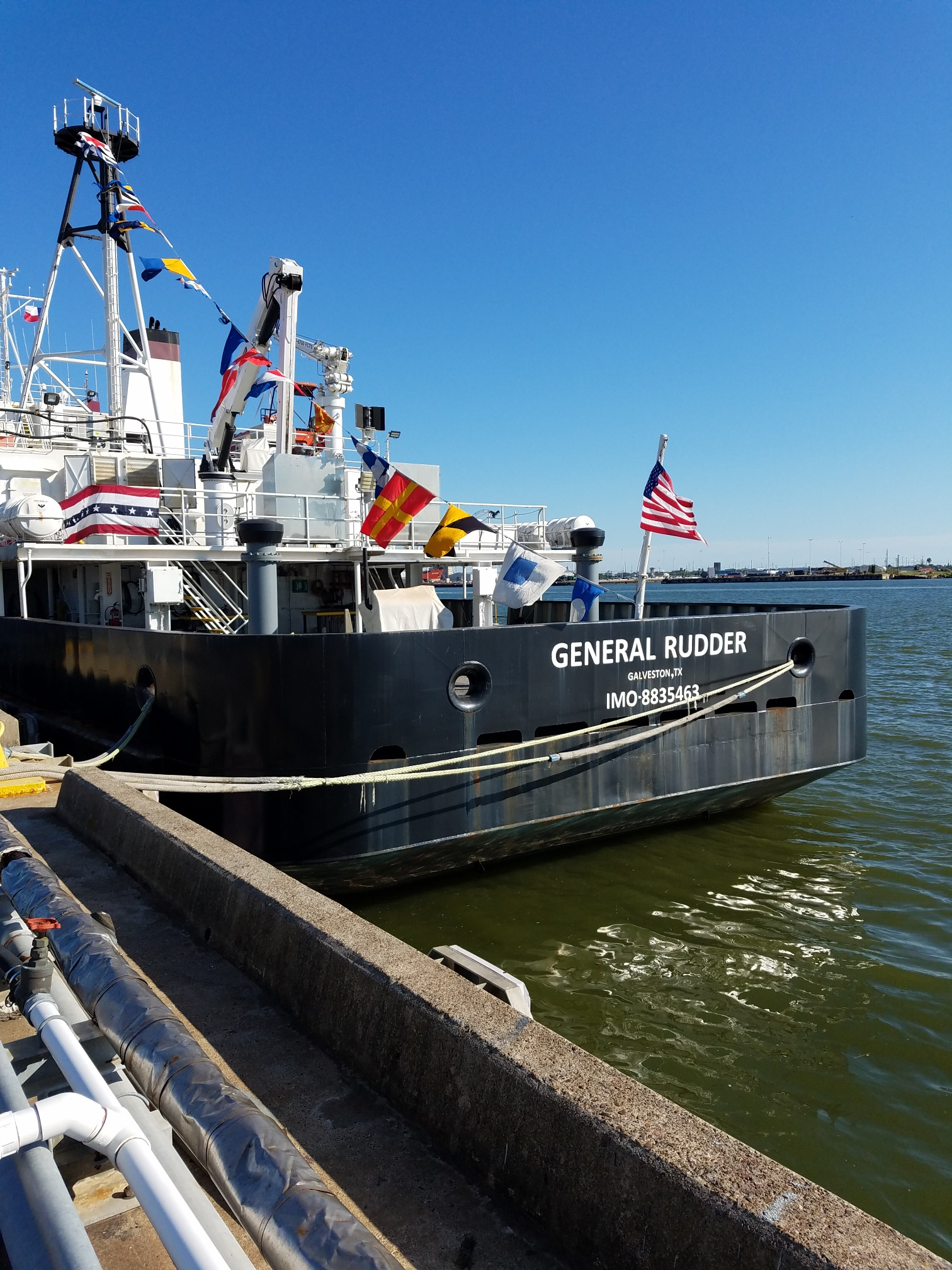
The TS General Rudder pierside at the Texas A&M Maritime Academy in Galveston, Texas

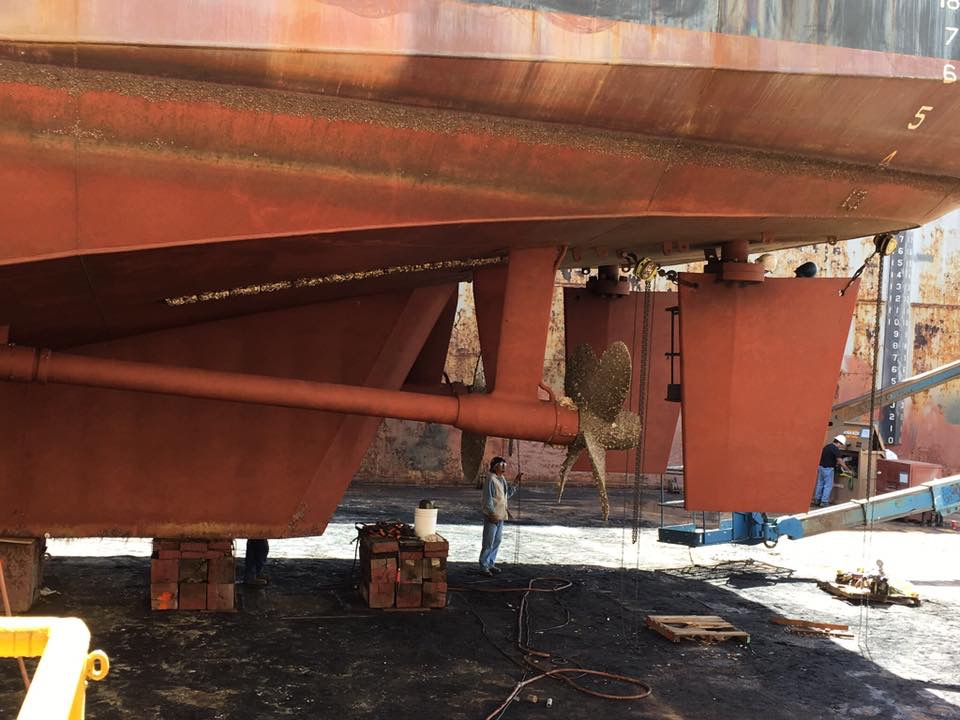
The propeller shafts and rudders of the TS General Rudder

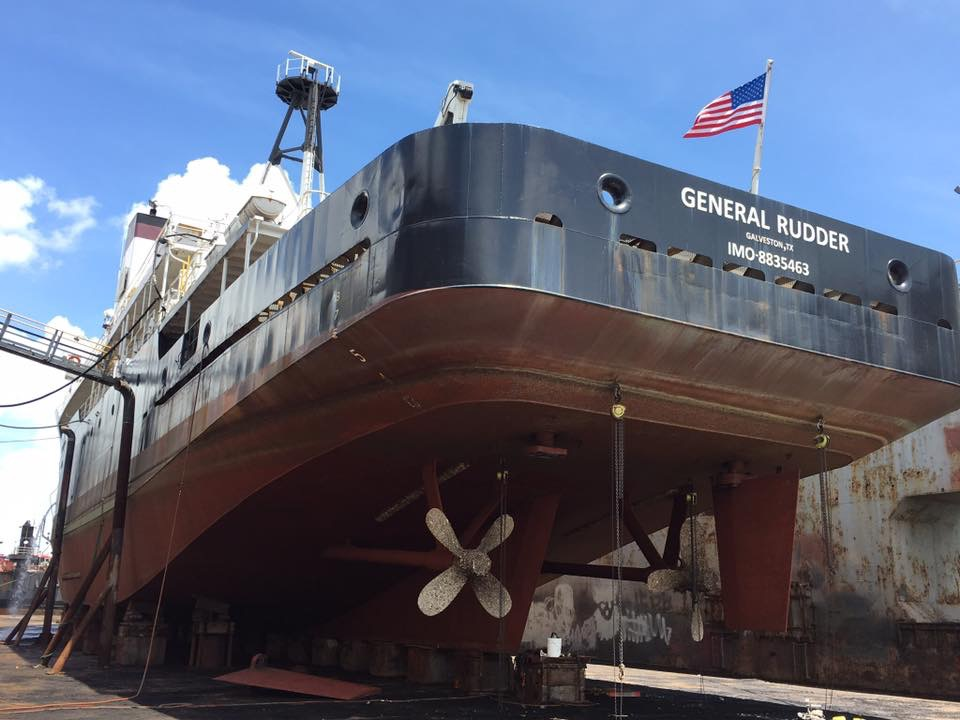
The aft portion of the TS General Rudder.

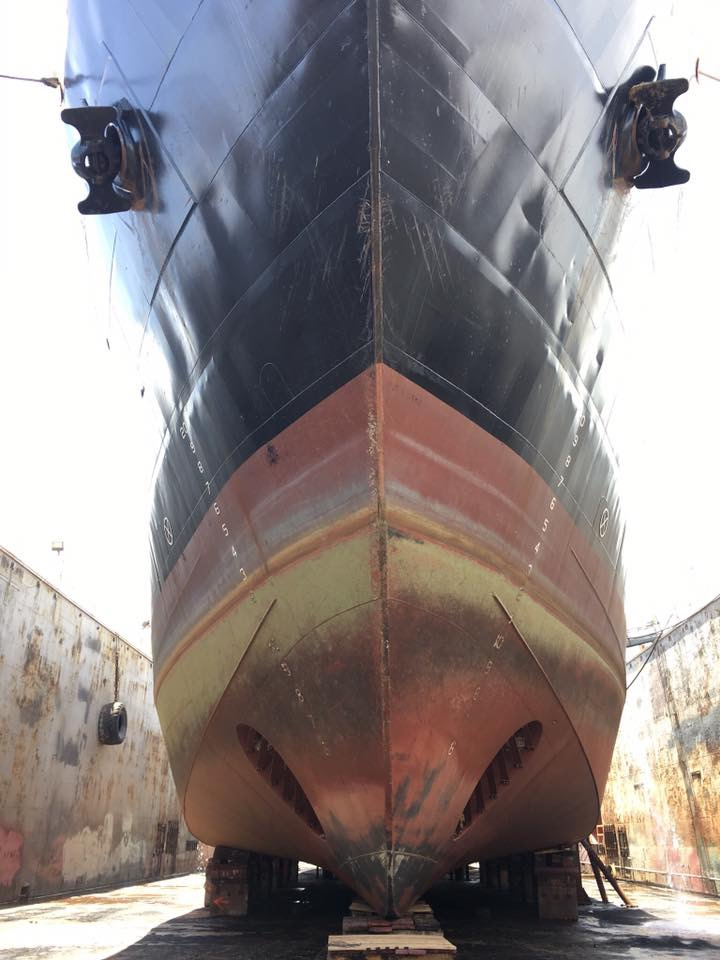
The bow of the TS General Rudder, with her 550-hp tunnel thruster
