= SS A. Mitchell Palmer =

WWII Liberty Ship

History

United States
- Name: A. Mitchell Palmer
- Namesake: A. Mitchell Palmer
- Builder: Southeastern Shipbuilding Corp., Savannah, Georgia
- Laid down: 17 December 1943
- Launched: 12 February 1944
- Fate: Scrapped, 1968

General characteristics
- Class & type: Liberty ship; type EC2-S-C1, standard
- Tonnage: 10,865 LT DWT; 7,176 GRT
- Displacement: 3,380 long tons (3,434 t) (light); 14,245 long tons (14,474 t) (max)
- Length: 441 feet 6 inches (135 m) oa; 416 feet (127 m) pp; 427 feet (130 m) lwl
- Beam: 57 feet (17 m)
- Draft: 27 ft 9.25 in (8.4646 m)
- Installed power: 2 × Oil fired 450 °F (232 °C) boilers, operating at 220 psi (1,500 kPa); 2,500 hp (1,900 kW)
- Propulsion: 1 × triple-expansion steam engine, (manufactured by Vulcan Iron Works, Wilkes-Barre, Pennsylvania); 1 × screw propeller
- Speed: 11.5 knots (21.3 km/h; 13.2 mph)
- Capacity: 562,608 cubic feet (15,931 m^{3}) (grain); 499,573 cubic feet (14,146 m^{3}) (bale)
- Complement: 38–62 USMM; 21–40 USNAG
- Armament: Varied by ship; Bow-mounted 3-inch (76 mm)/50-caliber gun; Stern-mounted 4-inch (102 mm)/50-caliber gun; 2–8 × single 20-millimeter (0.79 in) Oerlikon anti-aircraft (AA) cannons and/or, 2–8 × 37-millimeter (1.46 in) M1 AA guns

SS A. Mitchell Palmer (MCE-2436) was an EC2-S-C1 Type Liberty ship design cargo ship, named after U.S. Attorney General Alexander Mitchell Palmer. The ship's keel was laid by Southeastern Shipbuilding Corporation of Savannah, Georgia, on 17 December 1943, commissioned as part of the Second World War effort by the War Shipping Administration (WSA). It was launched 12 February 1944. It was scrapped in 1968 in Taiwan.

== Important Events ==
- 1944 WSA (operated by the Isbrandtsen Steamship Company, New York); one of 200 American Merchant Marine ships at Normandy in June 1944
- 1947 SuwaneeFruit & SS Corp, Jacksonville, USA.
- 1951 Honduras Shipping Co, Tegucigalpa, Honduras
- 1951 Renamed as the M/S Waimea, Compañía de Navegación Las Cruces, Panama – Honduras flag. (Carras Ltd, London)
- 1954 Renamed as the M/S Annitsa a, Santa Anna Corp, Honduras flag (same managers).
- 1956 (Angelos, Leitch & Co, London)
- 1957 (Angelos & Co, London)
- 1964 Renamed as the M/S Justice, Compañía de Navegación Pearl, Panama – Liberian flag (Ten Hu SS Co, Hong Kong).
- 1966 Ideal United SS Corp, Liberia (Tai An SS Co, Taipei).
- 1968 Scrapped Taiwan.
