= SS Robin Moor =

American cargo steamship

Coordinates: 6°10′N 25°40′W

History

United States
- Name: 1919: Shetucket; 1919–28: Nobles; 1928–41: Exmoor; 1941: Robin Moor
- Owner: 1919: US Government; 1919–28: US Shipping Board; 1928–41: American Export Lines; 1941: Seas Shipping Co, Inc
- Port of registry: New York
- Builder: American International Shipbuilding Corp., Hog Island
- Yard number: 536
- Launched: 23 August 1919
- Completed: October 1919
- Identification: US official number 218960; Code letters LTBR (until 1933); Call sign KJJU (1934 onward)
- Fate: Torpedoed and shelled 21 May 1941

General characteristics
- Class & type: Design 1022 cargo ship
- Tonnage: 4,999 GRT, 3,057 NRT
- Length: 390.0 ft (118.9 m)
- Beam: 54.2 ft (16.5 m)
- Depth: 27.6 ft (8.4 m)
- Decks: 2
- Installed power: 600 NHP
- Propulsion: steam turbine
- Speed: 11.5 knots (21 km/h)
- Crew: 46

SS Robin Moor was a United States cargo steamship that was built in 1919 and sunk by a German U-boat in May 1941, several months before the US entered World War II.

The U-boat allowed the passengers and crew to launch her lifeboats and abandon ship with no loss of life. However, the sinking of a neutral ship in an area considered until then to be relatively safe from U-boats, and the plight of her crew and passengers, caused a political incident in the United States.

The attack caused many to question the motives of U-69's commander, Jost Metzler as Hitler himself, preparing for his June 1941 invasion of Russia, had expressly ordered his Navy chief, Admiral Erich Raeder: "...in the next weeks all attacks on naval vessels in the closed area should cease..." Hitler did not wish to provoke America into joining with Britain in its fight against Germany.

== Building, names, and details ==
The ship was a Design 1022 Hog Islander, built by the American International Shipbuilding Corporation at its emergency shipbuilding yard at Hog Island, just outside Philadelphia. She was yard number 536, laid down for the US Government as Shetucket, but completed in October 1919 for the United States Shipping Board as Nobles. In 1928 American Export Lines bought her and renamed her Exmoor. In 1940 the Seas Shipping Co. Inc., of New York, bought her and renamed her Robin Moor.

The ship had a registered length of 390.0 ft (118.9 m), beam of 54.2 ft (16.5 m) and depth of 27.6 ft (8.4 m), and her tonnages were 4,999 GRT and 3,057 NRT. She had a single propeller, driven by a steam turbine via double reduction gearing. Her turbine was rated at 600 NHP and gave her a speed of 11.5 knots (21 km/h). Her US official number was 218960. Until 1933 her code letters were LTBR, and from 1934 her wireless telegraph call sign was KJJU.

== Sinking ==
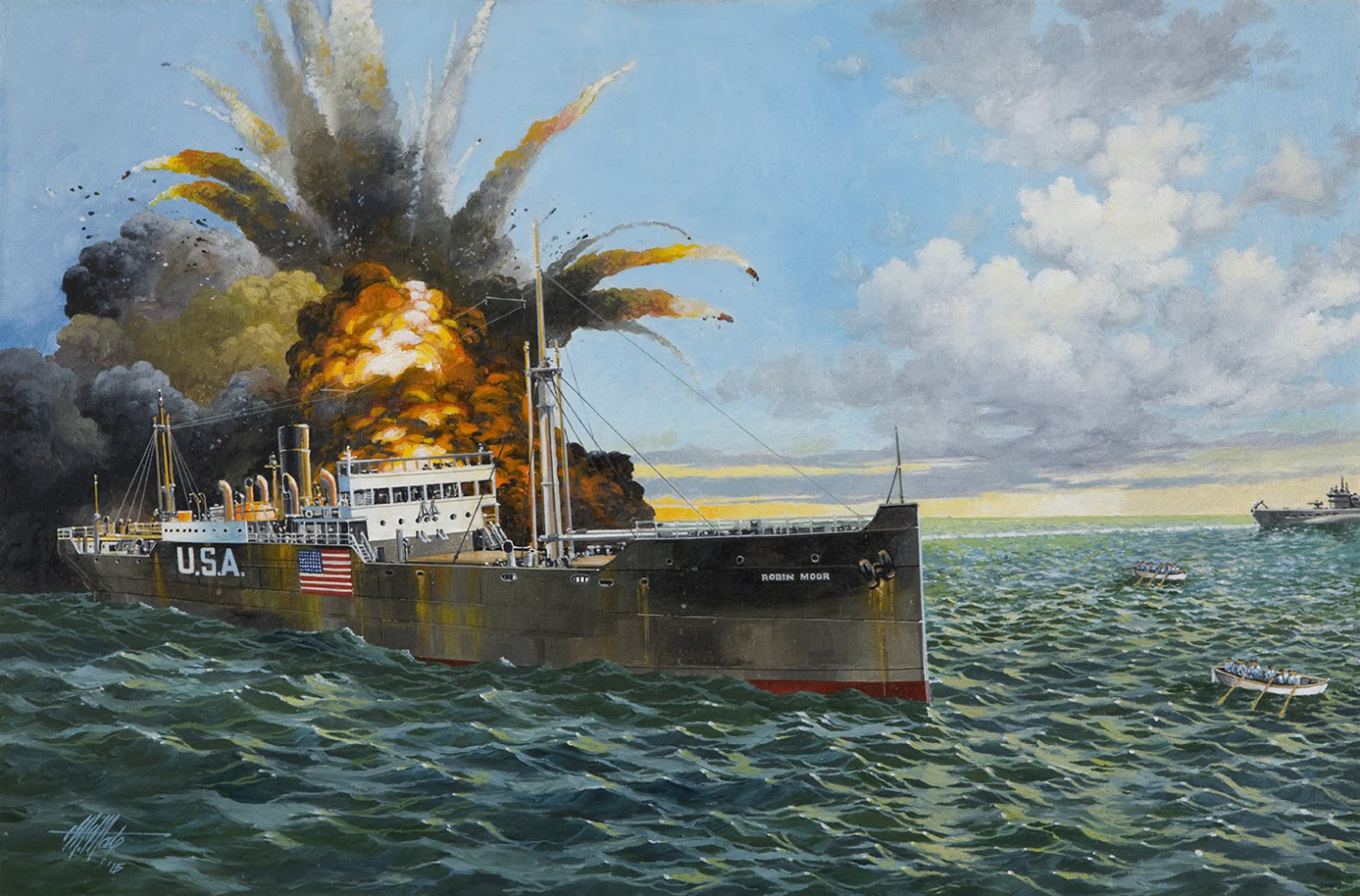
Painting of Robin Moor being sunk

In May 1941 Robin Moor, crewed by nine officers and 29 men, was sailing unescorted with eight passengers and a commercial cargo from New York to Mozambique via South Africa. Her cargo included "items of every conceivable description that would go into a general cargo", including over 450 autos and trucks, steel rails, tools, agricultural chemicals, over 48,000 U.S. gallons (180,000 L) of lubricant in drums, cases of shotgun shells, and a few .22 caliber rifles destined for sporting goods stores.

At 0525 hrs on 21 May, German submarine U-69 stopped Robin Moor in the tropical Atlantic 750 miles west of Freetown, Sierra Leone. Although Robin Moor was registered in a neutral country, the U-boat crew told her First Officer they had decided to "let us have it."

After a brief period for the ship's crew and passengers to board and launch her four lifeboats, U-69 fired a torpedo that hit Robin Moor amidships. She began to sink only slowly, so 40 minutes later U-69 surfaced and fired 39 rounds from her 88mm deck gun. After another 17 minutes Robin Moor sank. Wooden crates containing some of her deck cargo floated free, so U-69 fired on them with her 20mm anti-aircraft guns.

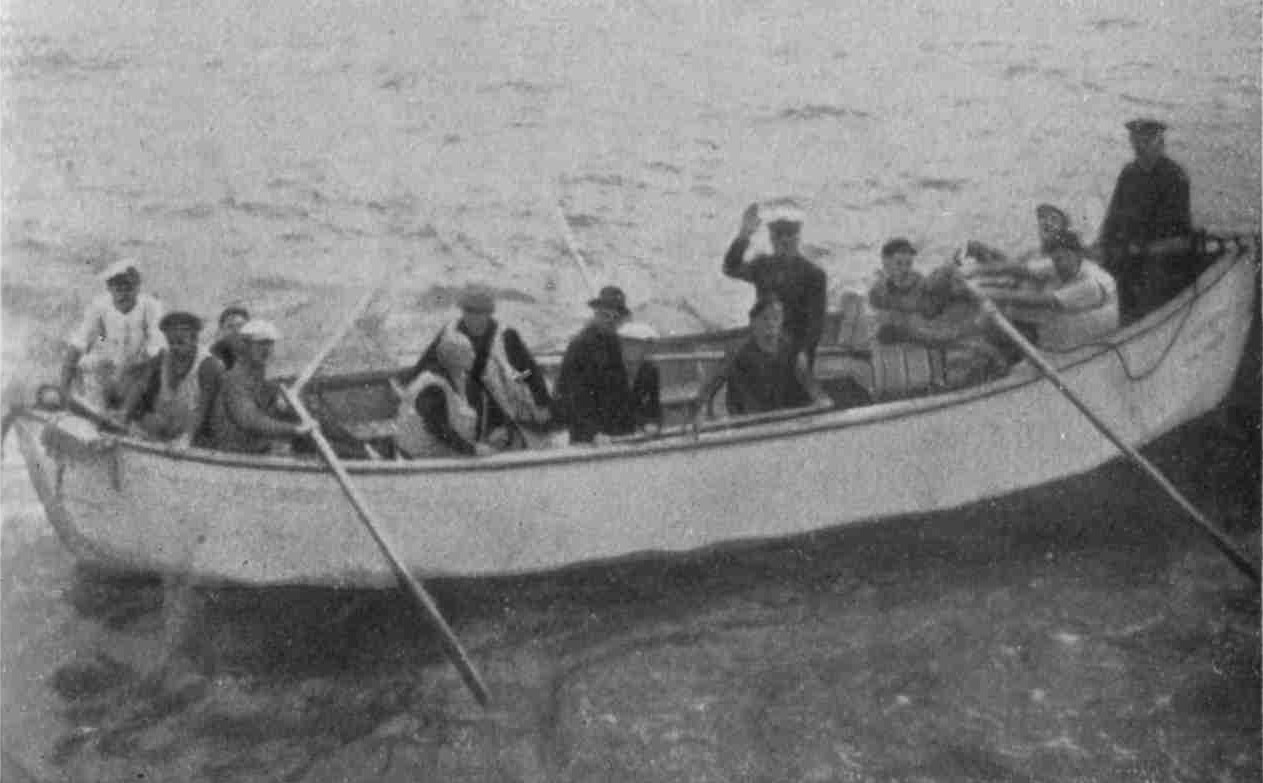
Captain Edward Myers waving Goodbye to the German submarine after his ship sank and the crew had been released, photo taken from U-69 by her crew

After the ship sank, U-69's crew pulled up to Captain Edward Myers' lifeboat, and gave him four tins of pressed black bread, two tins of butter, some Cognac, and bandages, and claimed that had sunk Robin Moor because she was carrying supplies to Germany's enemy. The lifeboat passengers found the black bread "too tough to eat".

== Rescue ==
When Robin Moor was stopped, U-69 forbade her crew to touch their wireless, but after the sinking, U-69's captain, Jost Metzler, reportedly promised the survivors he would radio their position. The captain kept the lifeboats near Robin Moor's position for 24 hours, then navigated towards St Paul's Rocks or the Brazilian coast with all four lifeboats bound together. The captain separated the lifeboats on 26 May as his plan was not working.

After 18 days the Brazilian merchant ship Osório rescued the lifeboat containing the captain and 10 others on 8 June. The news was relayed by radio from Osório to the Brazilian ship Lages, then the US merchant ship Deer Lodge, then RCA and finally Washington, D.C. Osório then went to Pernambuco where Brazil allowed the US ambassador to interview the rescued survivors first. On 14 June, the US Maritime Commission asked ships in the area of Robin Moor's sinking to look out for survivors, though The New York Times stated "Little or no hope is held out" for the remainder of the survivors.

On 13 June, two Connecticut residents independently stated they heard short-wave broadcasts from Italy that a submarine had docked at an Italian port carrying eight survivors from Robin Moor. This proved to be unfounded. The occupants of the rescued lifeboat presumed that the remaining crew and passengers were lost, but the British Ellerman Lines cargo ship City of Wellington found them on 2 June. She was sailing under radio silence, but was able to receive the news that the captain's party was rescued and those aboard City of Wellington were presumed dead. On 18 June City of Wellington landed survivors at Cape Town in South Africa, and their rescue immediately became news.

All of the crew and passengers were rescued. The contingent that had been landed in Brazil returned to the US aboard Delargentino.

== Aftermath ==
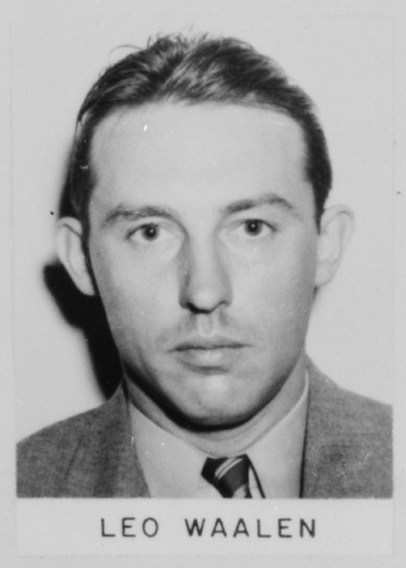
Leo Waalen, FBI file photo

Isolationist United States Senator Gerald Nye, blaming Britain for sinking Robin Moor, said he would be "very much surprised if a German submarine had done it because it would be to their disadvantage" to torpedo the ship.

On 11 June, The New York Times, reporting several different rumors pointing to German blame, also said there may have been Italian submarines in the area, and quoted a German source that said the reports were "confusing, unclear, and contradictory."

Nye withdrew his comment on 14 June 1941, stating "The evidence that the Robin Moor was sunk by a German submarine is too complete to permit my declaration of yesterday noon, to the effect that the boat might have been sunk by Britain, to stand", through the America First Committee.

President Roosevelt later stated in a message to Congress regarding the sinking that the survivors were "accidentally discovered and rescued by friendly vessels. This chance rescue does not lessen the brutality of casting the boats adrift in mid-ocean." Senator Theodore F. Green (D-RI) stated "I don't think the sinking will have any more effect than the sinking of The Panay by Japan. An act of war is bilateral, not unilateral." Also speaking about the Panay incident, Representative Melvin J. Maas (R-MN) said "Japan... not only failed to rescue survivors but machine-gunned them afterward and we didn't go to war."

Senator Pat McCarran said "It is nothing to get excited about". Senator Ralph O. Brewster said "The effect of the sinking depends on the attitude of Germany — whether it is a determined policy or an accident". U.S. Representative John William McCormack said "It was very unfortunate but there is no reason now to get unnecessarily excited over this incident". Representative Andrew J. May, chairman of the House Military Affairs Committee, said "We ought to convoy with battleships and let the shooting start and see who shoots first and who can outshoot".

While Roosevelt responded to the sinking with strong words, the strength of his administration's actions was disputed. His message to Congress described Germany's decision to sink the ship as "a disclosure of policy as well as an example of method." His message concluded:

In brief, we must take the sinking of the Robin Moor as a warning to the United States not to resist the Nazi movement of world conquest. It is a warning that the United States may use the high seas of the world only with Nazi consent. Were we to yield on this we would inevitably submit to world domination at the hands of the present leaders of the German Reich. We are not yielding and we do not propose to yield.

— Franklin D. Roosevelt

German assets were frozen on 12 June, then on 14 June the State Department required Germany and Italy to close all of their consulates in the United States except for their embassies, prompting Germany to issue the same directive to the United States in return. The US also demanded damages and reparations from Germany, without success.

In Congress, isolationist Senator Burton K. Wheeler (D-MT) claimed that 70% of the ship's cargo constituted the kind of materials meeting both German and British standards for contraband, defended the legality of Germany's right to destroy her, and characterised Roosevelt's message as an effort to bring the United States into the war. Others, such as Senator Claude Pepper, urged their colleagues to require the arming of merchant vessels.

In October 1941, federal prosecutors in the espionage case against a group of 33 defendants known as the "Duquesne Spy Ring" adduced testimony that Leo Waalen, one of the 14 accused men who had pled not guilty, had submitted the sailing date of the Robin Moor for radio transmission to Germany, five days before the ship began her final voyage. Waalen and the others were found guilty on 13 December 1941.

== In literature ==
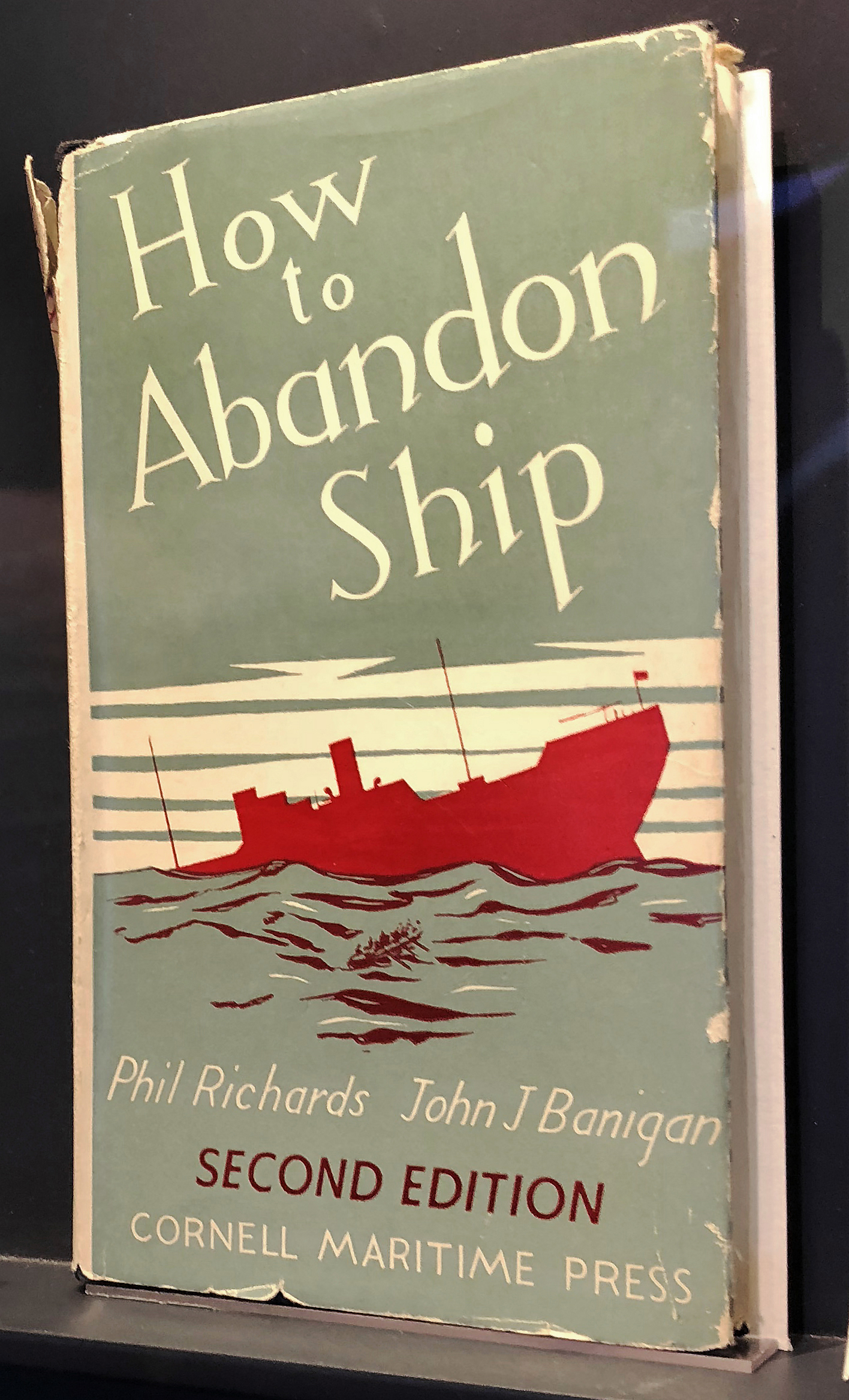
How To Abandon Ship: National World War II Museum, New Orleans

John J. Banigan, Third Officer of Robin Moor, and New York writer Phil Richards went on to write How to Abandon Ship (ISBN 0870333887). The book articulates Naval experience and serves as a detailed survival guide for sailors in a wartime environment.
