= Texas A&M University at Galveston =

Branch Campus of Texas A&M University

Coordinates: 29.3156°N 94.8175°W

- Type: Public branch campus
- Established: 1962
- Parent institution: Texas A&M University
- Endowment: $5.6 billion
- Chief Operating Officer: Rear Admiral Michael E. Fossum, USMS
- Faculty: 350+
- Students: 2,324 (Fall 2015)
- Undergraduates: 2,162 (Fall 2015)
- Postgraduates: 162 (Fall 2015)
- Doctoral students: 42 (Fall 2015)
- Location: Galveston, Texas, United States
- Campus: Suburban, 135 acres (0.546 km^{2})
- Colors: Maroon and white
- Nickname: Sea Aggies
- Mascot: Reveille X
- Website: www.tamug.edu

Texas A&M University at Galveston (TAMUG) is an ocean-oriented branch campus of Texas A&M University offering both undergraduate and graduate degrees. Students enrolled at Texas A&M University at Galveston, known affectionately as 'Sea Aggies', share the benefits of students attending Texas A&M University (TAMU) campus in the city of College Station. TAMUG is located on Pelican Island, offering benefits for its maritime focused majors.

The campus's academic programs are ocean-focused. It is the home of the Texas A&M Maritime Academy and has a Navy-option-only NROTC unit on campus. (Marine Corps-option NROTC cadets must attend the main campus in College Station.) It also hosts a Coast Guard Auxiliary University Program (AUP) unit, which provides a pathway to commission into the Coast Guard upon graduation, as they do not have an ROTC program.

== History ==
Texas A&M University at Galveston began in 1962 as a marine laboratory and as the home of the Texas Maritime Academy of Texas A&M University (which is now known as Texas A&M Maritime Academy). The federal government donated the first training ship, the Texas Clipper, to the Maritime Academy in 1965. In 1968, the campus was expanded with a 100-acre (0.40 km^{2}) donation by George P. Mitchell on Pelican Island. Land was donated again in 1993 with an additional 35 acres (140,000 m^{2}), as well as 14 acres (57,000 m^{2}) on Teichman Road to house TEEX, the sailing and rowing teams. Since then, academics at Texas A&M at Galveston have been distinctively focused on the ocean; in the fields of marine biology, marine sciences and oceanography, administration, and engineering. Enrollment included 91 students in 1971.

== Academics ==
Texas A&M University at Galveston is categorized as a dedicated college of Texas A&M University. For example, Marine Engineering Technology is a degree offered by Texas A&M University at Galveston, whereas Ocean Engineering is offered at the Galveston Campus, but administered by the College of Engineering. In 2021 President M. Katherine Banks initiated a "Path Forward" plan to reorganize the university. Part of this plan is to rename the academic college on the Galveston Campus to avoid confusion.

=== Undergraduate programs ===
Undergraduate science programs offered by TAMUG include Majors in marine biology, marine science, and others. For those wishing to pursue programs in liberal arts and social sciences, students can pursue the major in maritime studies. Engineering programs offered by Texas A&M University at Galveston include Ocean Engineering, Marine Engineering Technology and Computer Science.

The College of Engineering is also present on the Galveston Campus. Many freshmen are students in the Engineering at Galveston program, which allows College Station engineering freshmen to complete their required coursework at TAMUG. This coursework consists of two math, two natural science, and two engineering courses. Once completed, Engineering at Galveston students matriculate into their degree program through the Entry to a Major (ETAM) process (either in College Station, Galveston, or McAllen). After ETAM, students may pursue Ocean Engineering, Multidisciplinary Engineering Technology, and Computer Science in Galveston.

The Texas A&M Maritime Academy offers a unique program that trains licensed United States mariners as either third mates or third assistant engineers through the maritime transportation, marine engineering technology, or master of maritime administration and logistics license options.

=== Graduate programs ===
Graduate programs at TAMUG are administered by the Departments of Marine Biology, Marine Sciences, and Maritime Administration. Programs include PhD or master's degrees (thesis or non-thesis).

In addition to the local graduate programs administered by the Galveston campus, many faculty hold joint graduate or joint appointments in other departments at Texas A&M University at College Station (TAMU). This allows graduate students to enroll in PhD programs at TAMU yet complete the PhD in residence on the Galveston campus with the appropriate faculty advisor.

=== 3+2 Programs ===
Undergraduate students who immediately know they wish to pursue some graduate school may benefit from a "3+2" program, which allows students to concurrently pursue undergraduate and master's degrees. The duration of the program is 5 years, and the student receives two Texas A&M University degrees (bachelor's and master's). These programs are a year less than usually needed to complete these degrees separately (6 years), which provides considerable added value to their educational careers. Multiple programs are currently offered at TAMUG in this fashion, including bachelor of ocean and coastal resources with a Master of Marine Resources Management in the Department of Marine Sciences, bachelor of maritime administration and a master of maritime administration and logistics in the Department of Maritime Administration, and Oceans and One Health, which provides a Master of Science in Clinical Laboratory Science.

== Student life ==
Enrollment at TAMUG increased from 551 in 1987 to more than 2000 students in 2012. Students originate from 49 different states and the District of Columbia. Science and engineering majors amount to 75% of the student body; 43% are women, and about 50% reported themselves to have been in the top 20% of their high school classes. About 57% plan to pursue a master's or PhD degree and about 65% receive some type of financial aid.

On-campus housing is available and may be required for some students. The campus offers volleyball courts, a gym, a pool, tennis courts, an indoor basketball court, a student center, and many other amenities. Changes and modernizations are happening fast, with recently added residential dormitories and a new Corps of Cadets dorm scheduled for completion in early 2016.

== Texas A&M Maritime Academy ==

The Texas A&M Maritime Academy' (TMA) is one of only seven United States maritime academies that train U.S. Merchant Marine officers, and the only one located on the Gulf of Mexico. The program provides an opportunity for cadets to learn how to maintain and operate unlimited-tonnage ocean-going vessels. Students sail aboard the TMA training ship and commercial ships during three summer cruises to gain practical experience in navigation, seamanship, and engineering operations. In addition, the cadets receive classroom instruction and hands-on training during the regular school semester. Training facilities include the training ship, simulators, diesel and steam labs, various small boats, davits, and other hands-on resources. At the culmination of their study, license option or strategic sealift officer program cadets are tested to become licensed as unlimited-tonnage third mates or third engineers (officers) in the U.S. Merchant Marine. This is per Title 46 Code of the Code of Federal Regulation Part 11. The academy also commissions reserve and active duty naval officers.

=== History ===
On January 26, 1962, a long sought-after idea of a Texas-based maritime academy came to fruition when the Texas Governor Price Daniel and the president of Texas A&M, General Earl Rudder, signed the agreement authorizing the Texas Maritime Academy. General Rudder subsequently named retired Navy Captain Bennett M. Dodson as the first superintendent of the Texas Maritime Academy. Monday, September 17, 1962, was to be the opening day, and Captain Dodson had put the first class of 23 "Saltwater Aggies" under the guidance of the first Marine Corps company at College Station. This was to inspire maritime cadets with a sense of discipline and tradition at sea. Dodson is quoted saying, "I wanted my students to get Marine Corps discipline and knowledge of Naval tradition during their early college life." The maritime cadets were assigned to Dorm 11 as Company I, 3rd Brigade, (I-3). After their freshman year at the main campus in College Station, the cadets were then moved to Galveston to complete their maritime-related classes. The academy operated between the two campuses for eight years, up to 1971.

In the summer of 1963, as the fledgling academy awaited its own training vessel, some 50 A&M Cadets got underway aboard the Empire State IV with SUNY Maritime for their first official cruise. A&M President Rudder had promised TMA its own ship by the summer of 1965. In that year, the U.S. Maritime Administration announced it would donate the American Export Lines vessel Excalibur, but the vessel was sold, instead. In March, the academy acquired the luxury liner USS Queens, and in June she was refitted to become the USTS Texas Clipper, the academy's first training ship. May 26, 1966 marked the first license ceremony with 13 seniors and General Rudder gave the keynote address. Two days later, the graduating cadets were driven to College Station to attend the Aggie commencement and receive their diplomas. This back-to-back practice continued for 19 years until Galveston started holding its own ceremony.

Currently, cadets/midshipmen do the entire program at the Galveston campus, but participate in two march-ins at Kyle Field per year with the College Station Corps of Cadets. The license ceremony and commencement take place at the Galveston Island Convention Center (2015).

==== Superintendents ====
Since the passage of the Merchant Marine Act of 1970, the position of superintendent a maritime academy is commissioned as a rear admiral (upper half) in the United States Maritime Service, which is under the United States Maritime Administration per Secretary of the Department of Transportation.

Name	Rank USMS	From	To	Military service	Merchant Marine Service	Notes
Bennett M. Dodson	CPT, USN (ret)	1962	1968	CPT, USN (ret)	Unknown	
James D. Craik	RADM, USCG (ret)	1968	1971	RADM, USCG (ret)	Unknown	
John Smith	RADM, USMS	1971	1978	RADM, USN (ret)	Unknown	
Kenneth G. Haynes	RADM, USMS	1978	1983	Unknown	Unknown	
William H. Clayton	RADM, USMS	1983	1984	Unknown	Unknown	Acting
Ralph G. Davis	RADM, USMS	1984	1988	CDR, USN	Unknown	USNA alumnus
James M. McCloy	RADM, USMS	1988	1989	Unknown	Unknown	Interim
William E. Evans	RADM, USMS	1989	1996	Unknown	Unknown	
William T. McMullen	RADM, USMS	1996	2000	Unknown	Unknown	
Richard Lukens	RADM, USMS	2000	2004	Unknown	Unknown	
James M. McCloy	RADM, USMS	2004	2007	Unknown	Unknown	
Allen B. Worley	RADM, USMS	2007	2009	Unknown	Unknown	
William W. Pickavance	RADM, USMS	2009	2012	RADM, USN (ret)	Deck Officer AGT	Alumni
Robert Smith III	RADM, USMS	2012	2017	RADM, USN (ret)	Unknown	Alumni
Michael Rodriguez	RADM, USMS	2017	2019	Naval Reserve Officer	Captain AGT	Kings Point Alumni
Michael E. Fossum	RADM, USMS	2019	pres	COL, USAF (ret)	Unknown	Alumni (TAMU)

=== Programs ===
==== Merchant Marine Licensing Program ====
This program includes both "deck cadets" pursuing a major in marine transportation or a master of maritime administration and logistics and "engine cadets" pursuing a major in marine engineering technology. License option cadets make up the majority of the Texas A&M Maritime Academy. These cadets participate in all functions of the Corps of Midshipman, along with various training activities, three summer training cruises, weekly maintenance, and in-port watch-standing activities during the semesters.

==== Strategic Sealift Officer Program ====
This program is made up of license option cadets who are additionally striving for a commission in the United States Navy Reserve as a naval officer with a 166x designator (strategic sealift officer - SSO). As another option, SSO program midshipman are eligible for an active-duty commission. These midshipman make up the second-most popular program within the academy and participate in both license program training activities and NROTC training activities and take additional naval science courses.

This program also offers the cadet a competitive-based student incentive payment of $8000 per year for up to four years.

==== Navy Reserve Officer Training Program ====
These midshipmen are competing for a commission as a naval officer but are not earning a merchant marine license. They participate within the Corps of Midshipmen, yet do not participate in most of the licensing program training. NROTC midshipmen are able to major in any degree offered at the campus.

==== Drill and Ceremonies Program ====
These cadets participate in the Corps of Midshipmen without obligation to any above program. Like NROTC midshipmen, they are able to pursue any major offered.

=== US Coast Guard MARGRAD Program ===
The Maritime Academy Graduate Direct Commission Officer Program is available to cadets who graduate with a license. Cadets apply their senior year to receive a three-year commission as a USCG officer into critical service need specialties appropriate to their training and experience.

=== Corps of Midshipmen ===
All students in the Texas A&M Maritime Academy are required to be in the Corps of Midshipmen. This is a regimented program in accordance with Title 46 Part 310 of the Code of Federal Regulations that is structured to provide discipline, leadership, team building, and a professional learning environment. The TMA Corps of Midshipmen has a unique heritage, with a blend of tradition and customs that originate from its historical foundation with the TAMU Corps of Cadets.

Midshipmen stand morning formations, room inspections, mandatory study periods during call to quarters Sunday through Thursday, and march periodically at events.

The students who make up the Corps of Midshipmen are either referred to as midshipmen or cadets, depending on the program in which they are involved. Within the overall student body, they are referred to as the Corps of Midshipmen.

Cadet/midshipman uniforms have evolved over the years and are similar to naval uniforms. The standard uniform worn day-to-day is the midshipman khaki uniform, similar to service khakis of the U.S. Navy. Other uniforms include the midshipman service dress whites for graduation or special ceremonies, midshipman summer whites, academy blue-coveralls for maintenance, and salt & peppers. SSO and NROTC midshipman wear the Navy working uniform to training events, as well.

The academy has several unique uniform components. Freshman and sophomores wear a black belt with a blue cover. Juniors and seniors wear a white belt with a black cover. Corresponding collar devices and belt buckles are also worn depending on class and rank. Seniors are also allowed to wear a "senior fleece" with a TMA patch in place of the navy Eisenhower jacket. Seniors who have also passed license are authorized to wear a coveted maroon A&M cover, handed out by the superintendent (2015).

Special units are organized groups within the corps made up from cadets of all four programs. The special units include the Hearn Honor Company, Color Guard, and Midshipman Drill Team.

The organization structure of the Corps of Midshipmen is mixed with professional staff members at the top and cadet/midshipmen senior leadership. The superintendent, deputy superintendent, assistant commandant, and active-duty naval officers make up the professional staff. The regimental commander, battalion commanders, and company commanders make up the cadet senior leadership.

The Corps of Midshipmen is divided into two battalions and 12 companies (2015). Eight companies are made up primarily of deck license option cadets, two of engineering license option cadets, and two "victor" companies. Victor companies comprise cadets of mixed programs and are either 25 years or older, are married, or have a bachelor's degree or prior military experience. Victor company cadets are allowed to live off campus and participate less in regimental activities. They are generally regarded to set the example for other cadets with their age and experience.

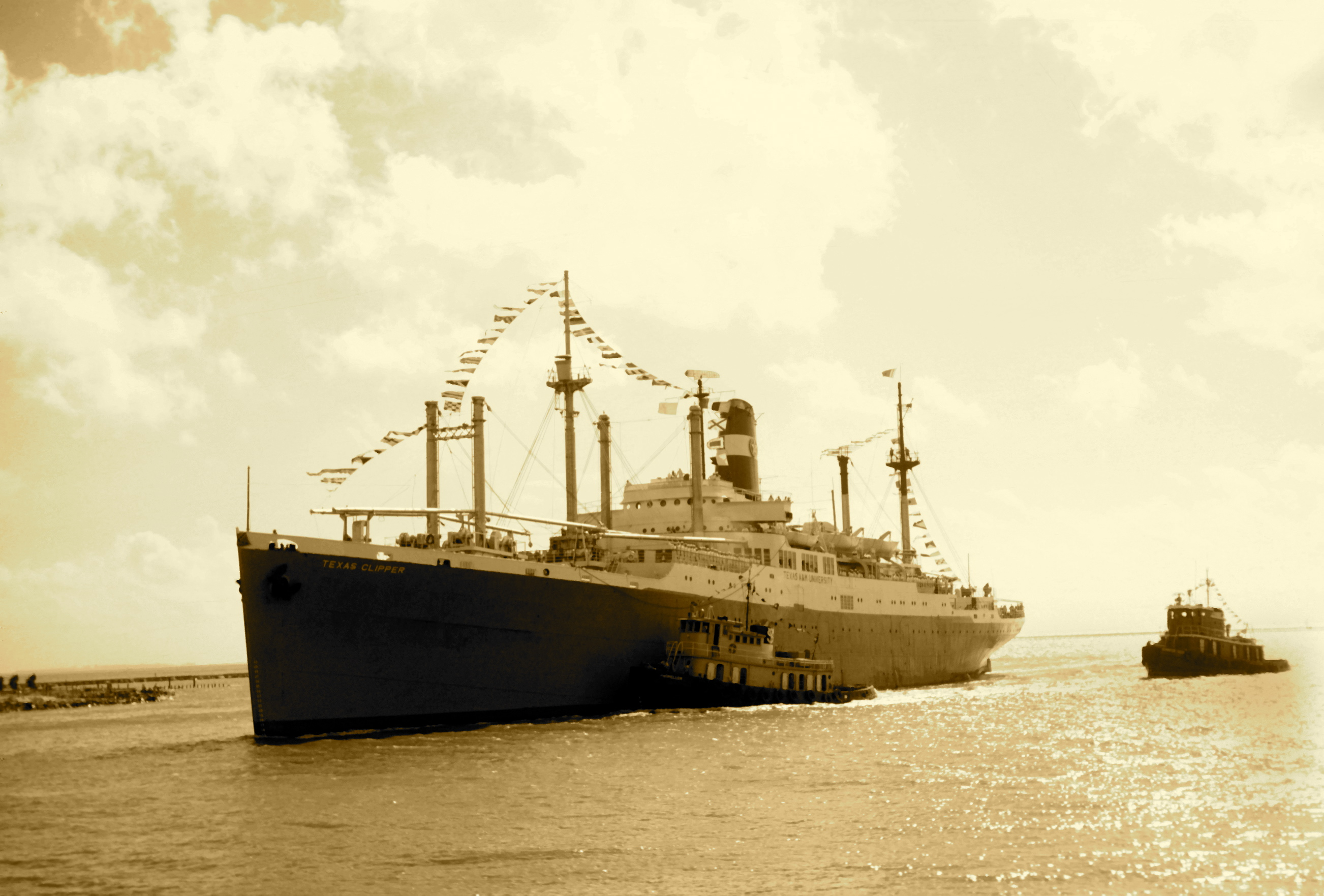
Texas Clipper, Texas A&M Maritime Academy, ca. June 1968 (1965–1996)

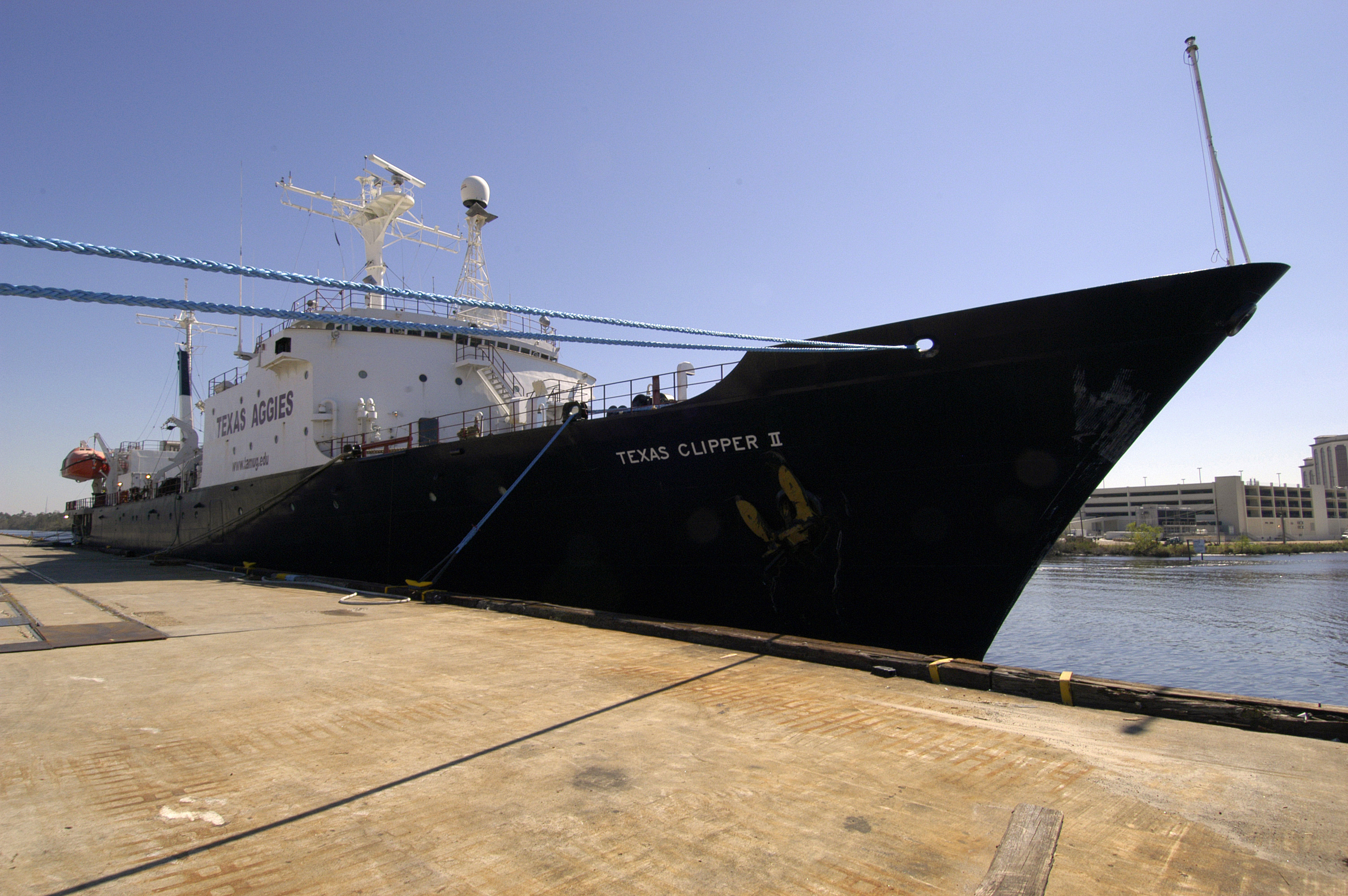
Texas Clipper II (1999–2005)

=== The Texas Clipper and other training vessels ===
1. TS Texas Clipper, ex-USS Queens (APA-103) — 1965–1996
2. TS Texas Clipper II, ex-USNS Chauvenet (T-AGS-29) — 1999–2005
3. Sirius, ex-USNS Sirius (T-AFS-8) — 2005-2009
4. S.S. Cape Gibson — 2009–2012
5. TS General Rudder, ex-TV Kings Pointer — January 2012 – April 2023
6. TS Kennedy – April 2023 - September 2025
7. TS Lone Star State - September 2026 - present

The Texas Maritime Academy acquired its first training ship in 1965. Previously named the SS Excambion when sailed by American Export Lines, the vessel was renamed the Texas Clipper because of its rounded (or clipper) stern. In 1996, Texas A&M Galveston (of which Texas Maritime was now a part) retired the aging Texas Clipper. In its stead, the school acquired the decommissioned USNS Chauvenet. Built by Upper Clyde Shipbuilders of Glasgow, Scotland, in 1970, the new vessel was named the Texas Clipper II as per tradition.

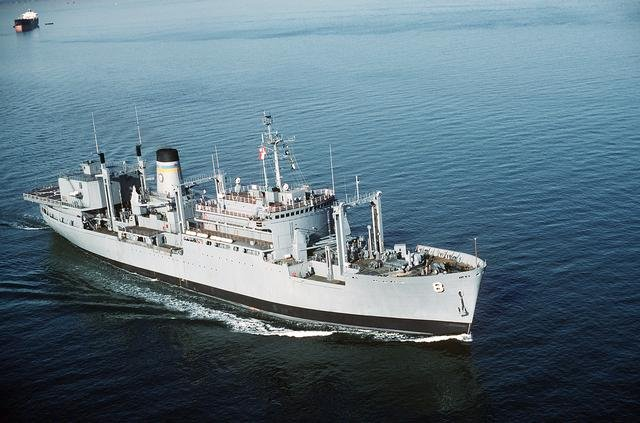
Sirius (T-AFS-8) en route to Norfolk, VA. after her AFS conversion, 1983 (2005–2009)

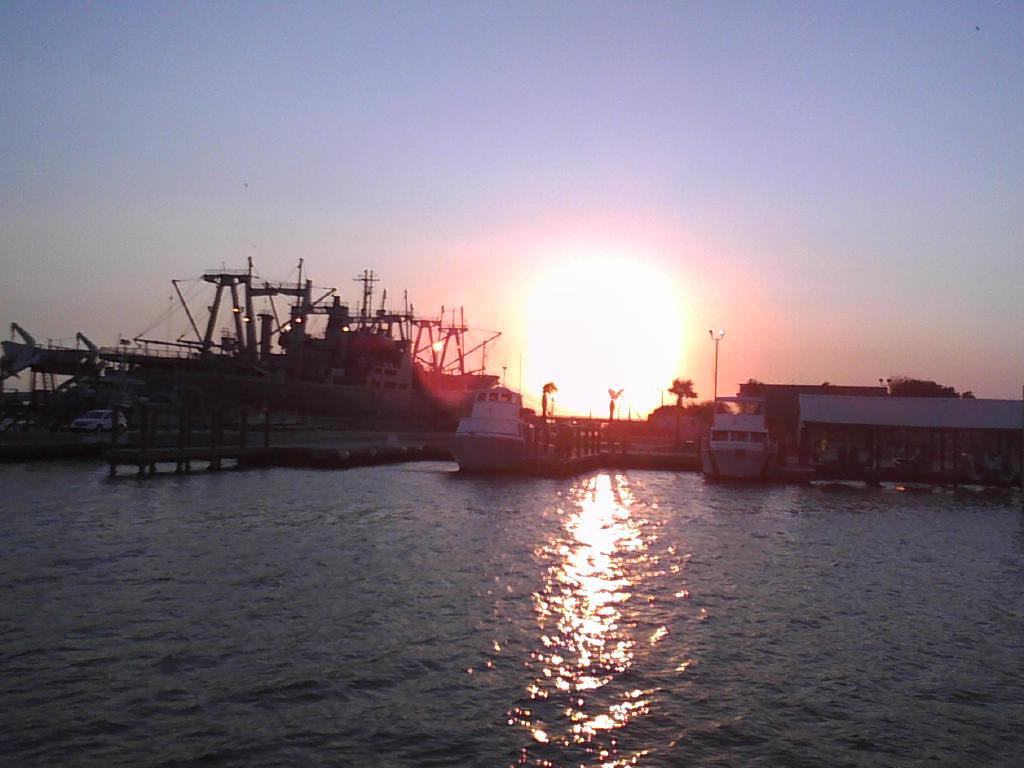
USNS Cape Gibson as the training ship in 2011: Other training vessels are seen in the small boat basin. The gravity davit lifeboat trainer is seen on the left. (2009–2012)

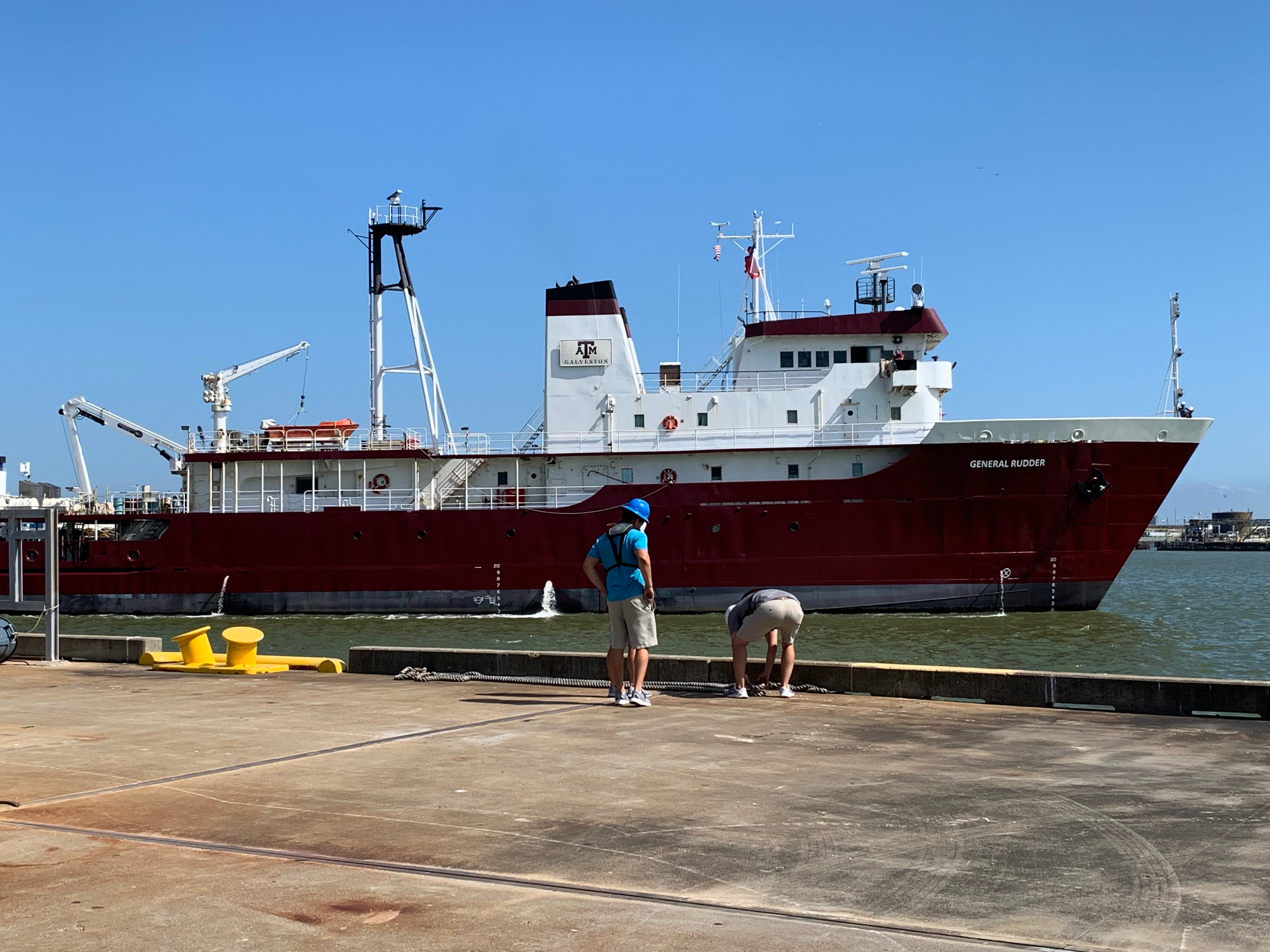
TS General Rudder on approach to Texas A&M Maritime Academy, 2019 (2012–2023)

In the summer of 2005, the Texas Maritime Academy took delivery of the USNS Sirius. Built in 1966 as a replenishment ship for the Royal Navy and purchased by the U.S. Navy as a logistics ship, it supported two carrier battle groups in the Indian Ocean during the Iranian hostage crisis and continued its career in the Navy serving across the world, notably in the Persian Gulf. It was retired and given to the U.S. Department of Transportation's Maritime Administration, then assigned to TAMUG under an agreement that it can be activated by MARAD at any time. During the fall of 2005, the Sirius served in New Orleans for Katrina relief, from September 10 until November 29 and at Lake Charles, LA for Rita relief until March 2. Because of its extended relief effort, Sirius was unable to undergo a refit in 2006 to adapt its new role as a training vessel and comply with U.S. Coast Guard safety standards. Because Sirius had not undergone a refit, it could not be formally commissioned as the USTS Texas Clipper nor could it be used for summer training cruises. This is forcing the university to look to the other state maritime academies (California Maritime Academy from 2006–present) to help fulfill the summer cruise requirements until the work on the Sirius was completed. In the winter of 2009, the US Coast Guard ruled that Sirius was unfit for training and was prepared for decommissioning while the school looked for a new training ship. On June 25, 2009, Sirius was returned to the U.S. Maritime Administration.

In 2009, the academy acquired SS Cape Gibson. The academy trained on this ship while it was docked at the campus but was again unable to sail on her until a refit was done. In 2012, the vessel was towed to the government's navy reserve fleet near Beaumont and replaced with the TS General Rudder. The academy's own General Rudder was the first vessel since 2005 on which it was able complete summer training cruises. The limited size of the vessel (64 personal), however, means a good majority of the cadets still sail with other maritime academies.

In April 2023, the academy acquired the TS Kennedy to serve as the training vessel until the arrival of the NSMV Lone Star State in 2025.

1. R/V Trident: The research vessel is a 70-ft catamaran that serves the maritime academy as an underway terrestrial, engineering, and electronic navigation lab. She also serves other majors at TAMUG for underwater research and exploration.
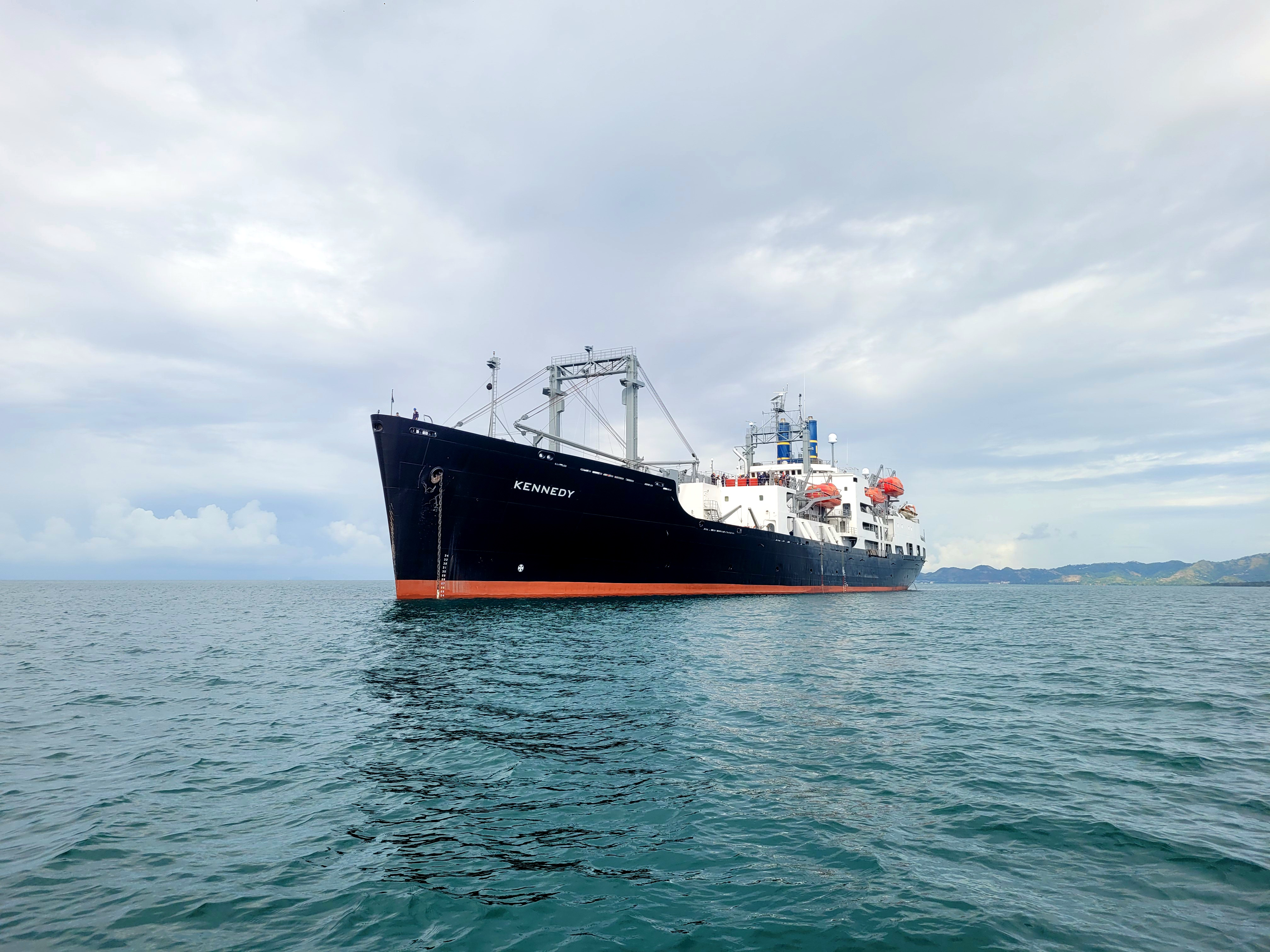
2. USTS Kennedy anchored in Mayaguez Bay, Puerto Rico, 2022 (2023–2025)
  Ranger is a 25.5-ft push boat built to scale. The vessel is used for tug and tow classes, using TAMUG 100 & 200 barges that are also built to scale to simulate liquid cargo barges.
  TS Lone Star State arrived at Texas A&M Maritime Academy on September 7, 2026 (2026–present)

The academy has a small boat basin with various other small boats, such as jet-drive fast-rescue boats, motor lifeboats, outboard motor boats, and twin-screw vessels used for ship handling, engineering, and general seamanship training.

As of September 2026, the TS Lone Star State, NSMV 4 has been completed and now serves as the primary training ship for Texas A&M Maritime Academy at Texas A&M University at Galveston. The vessel provides cadets with hands-on maritime training and practical shipboard experience, supporting their preparation for careers in the U.S. maritime industry.

== Traditions ==
Texas A&M University has many time-honored traditions, many of which began when the Agriculture and Mechanical College of Texas was established in 1876. Traditions continued to evolve as service in the Corps was no longer a requirement, giving a new generation of students an opportunity to alter traditions. Such traditions involve university-sponsored events such as Silver Taps honoring students who have died, to student-run events, which include the Student Bonfire.

Students attending TAMUG are known as Sea Aggies. The same Aggie ring that TAMU-College Station wear is offered to all students who have 90 credit hours (45 with the university) at TAMUG. Sea Aggies may also purchase tickets for all sporting events, fine arts performances, and concerts held in College Station.

In 2023, an 8-foot tall Aggie Ring statue was installed on campus, across from the Bracewell Clock Tower. The statue depicts two Aggie Rings: A small-size ring (often referred to as the Female Ring) bearing the 1975 class year above a large-size ring (the Male Ring) from 1966. The two rings mark two important years: 1966 for the first graduating class of Texas A&M University at Galveston, and 1975 for the first graduating class that admitted women and Black students. The statue is a sister to the 12-foot tall Aggie Ring replica at The Association of Former Students' Alumni Center, being designed and installed by the same foundry.

Starting in the 1970s, the students of Texas A&M at Galveston created their own Aggie Bonfire, mirroring the traditions of the College Station student body. However, the Galveston campus ceased observance of the tradition after the structure in College Station collapsed on November 18, 1999, killing 12 students.

Traditions unique to the Galveston campus include underclassmen students rubbing or placing coins upon the anchor of the TS Texas Clipper in front of the library prior to an exam for good luck. To walk beneath the arc of the anchor's chain is reserved as a senior privilege. Stepping on "Senior Knoll" is also reserved only for upperclassman.

Midnight Yell Practice is held on Thursday nights instead of the traditional Friday. This allows those attending the game in College Station to have time to make the two-hour drive on Friday. A student can subsequently go to a second Midnight Yell in College Station.

After disappearing in the late '70s, the Texas Maritime Academy band was resurrected in the fall of 2010. Under the guidance of Cmdr. James Sterling '71 US Navy (retired), who originated the TMA band as a cadet, the newly established band debuted at the 2010 Parent's Day Pass in Review ceremony. The TMA band has since been reorganized as the Sea Aggie Band, a student-led organization under the guidance of Cmdr. Sterling '71. The Sea Aggie Band performs at Midnight Yells, Silver Taps, Muster, and other events around campus and Galveston County.

Silver Taps is a nighttime bugle tribute paid to Aggies who were enrolled in classes at the time of their death, held at Academic Plaza in the College Station campus. It is mirrored in Galveston to honor Sea Aggies who have passed while enrolled, taking place in front of the Bracewell Clock Tower.

== Response to Hurricane Ike ==
In preparation of Hurricane Ike, TAMUG closed on Wednesday, September 10, 2008, at 5 pm and evacuation was ordered. Ike made U.S. landfall at Galveston, Texas, on September 13 at 2:10 am. It was the third-most destructive hurricane to ever make landfall in the United States. The campus was not severely damaged; however, the infrastructure of Galveston Island as a whole was. As a result of Galveston Island not being able to support the close to 1800 students, the enormous challenge of relocating all students, administration, and staff began. Most students were relocated to College Station, where on Wednesday, September 24, 2008, fall classes resumed. TAMUG resumed operations in Galveston in the spring of 2009.
