= SS Baylor Victory =

American WWII Victory ship

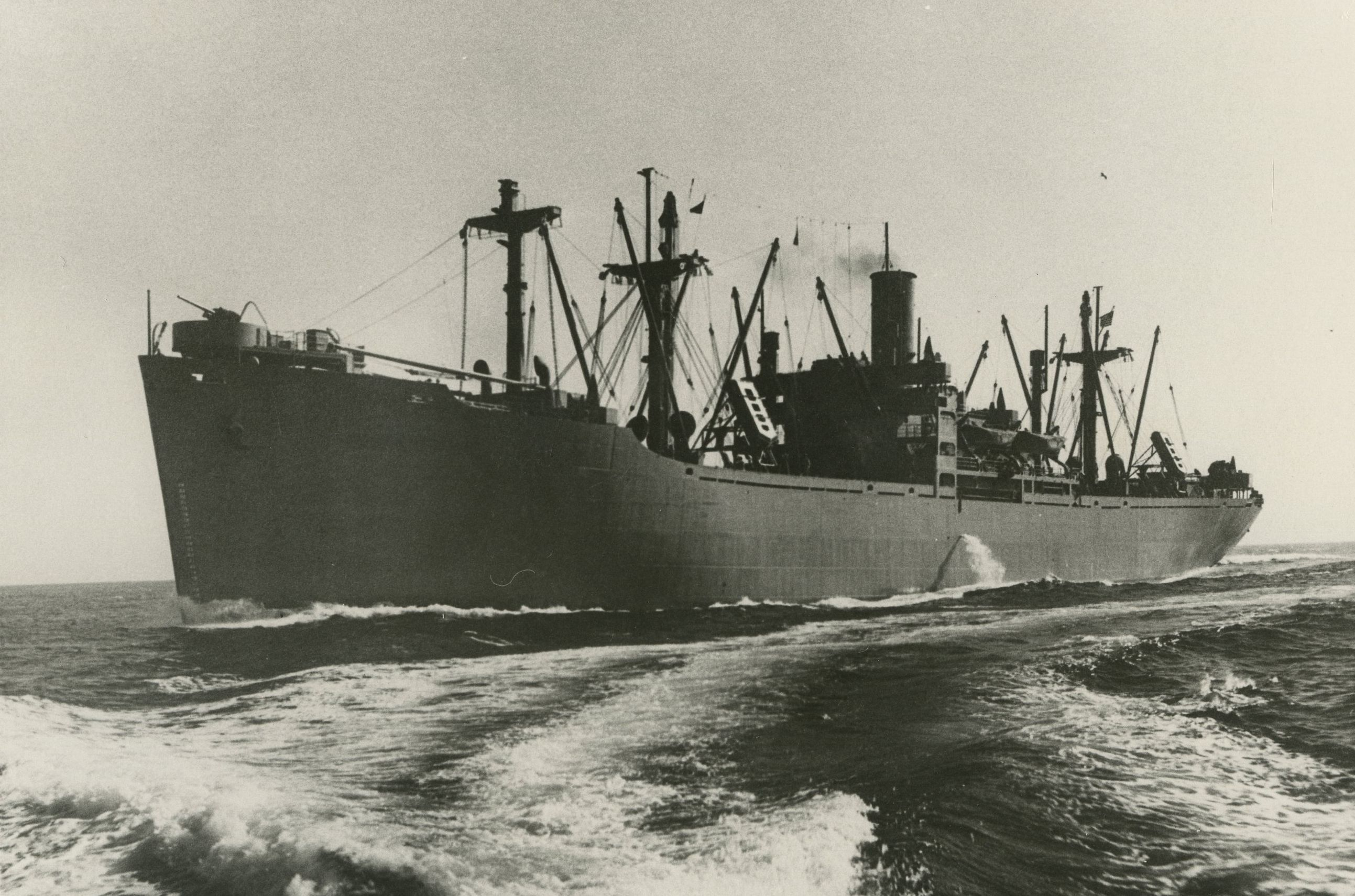
- SS Baylor Victory, 1945

History

United States
- Name: Baylor Victory
- Namesake: Baylor University
- Owner: War Shipping Administration
- Operator: American-Hawaiian Steamship Company
- Builder: California Shipbuilding Corporation, Los Angeles CA
- Yard number: V56
- Laid down: 13 January 1945
- Launched: 6 March 1945
- Completed: 30 March 1945
- Home port: Los Angeles
- Identification: IMO number: 5038478; Call sign: KCVS
- Fate: Scrapped 1970 in Kaohsiung, Taiwan, not repairable per cost

General characteristics
- Class & type: VC2-S-AP3 Victory ship
- Tonnage: 7,612 GRT, 4,553 NRT
- Displacement: 15,200 tons
- Length: 455 ft (139 m)
- Beam: 62 ft (19 m)
- Draught: 28 ft (8.5 m)
- Installed power: 8,500 shp (6,300 kW)
- Propulsion: HP & LP turbines geared to a single 20.5-foot (6.2 m) propeller
- Speed: 16.5 knots (30.6 km/h; 19.0 mph)
- Boats & landing craft carried: 4 Lifeboats
- Complement: 62 Merchant Marine and 28 US Naval Armed Guards
- Armament: 1 × 5-inch (127 mm)/38 caliber gun; 1 × 3-inch (76 mm)/50 caliber gun; 8 × 20 mm Oerlikon

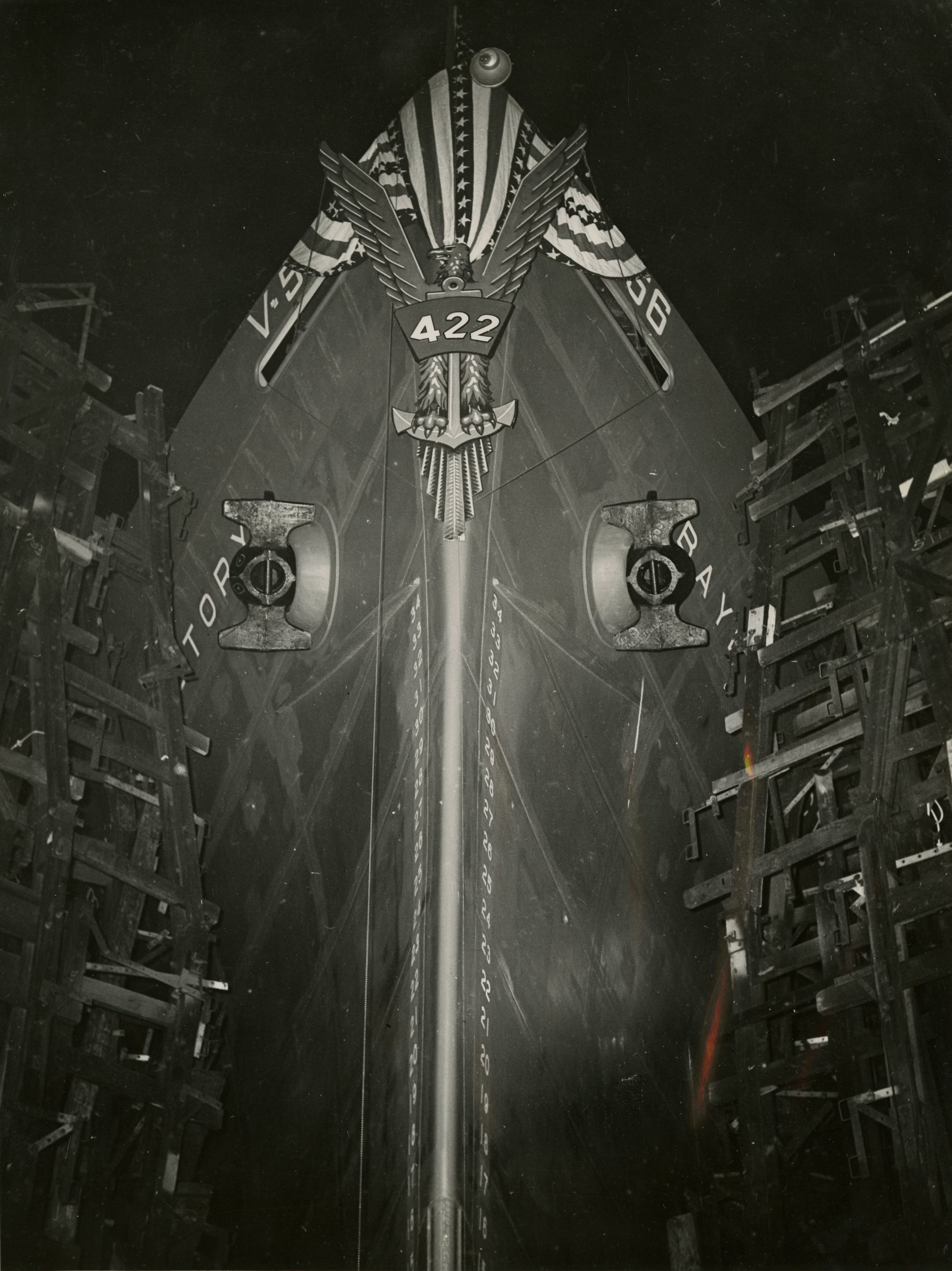
SS Baylor Victory launching and christening ceremony on March 30, 1945

SS Baylor Victory was a cargo Victory ship built during World War II under the Emergency Shipbuilding program. Baylor Victory (MCV-772) was a type VC2-S-AP2 Victory ship built by the California Shipbuilding Corporation in Los Angeles, California. The Maritime Administration cargo ship was the 772nd ship built. Her keel was laid on January 13, 1945. She was launched on March 6, 1945 and completed on March 30, 1945. The 10,600-ton ship was constructed for the Maritime Commission. She operated under the United States Merchant Marine act for the War Shipping Administration. She was named for Baylor University, a private Christian university in Waco, Texas. At her launching, Baylor University was represented by 18 graduates and friends. University President Pat M. Neff gave a short speech at the launching and christening ceremony. Los Angeles District Judge Minor L. Moore, a Baylor graduate of 1900, also spoke. Baylor Victory was launched at 1:20 a.m. and was lit up by large floodlights.

Victory ships were designed to supersede the earlier Liberty ships. Unlike Liberty ships, Victory ships were designed to serve the US Navy after the war and also last longer. The Victory ships differed from a Liberty ship in that they were faster, longer and wider, taller, and had a thinner stack set further toward the superstructure. They also had a long raised forecastle.

== World War II ==
Completed on March 30, 1945, the Baylor Victory did only a little operating during the World War, as the surrender of Imperial Japan was announced on August 15, 1945. Baylor Victory worked delivering cargo across the Pacific Ocean. Normal runs were from Pier 24 in San Francisco and the Port of Los Angeles in San Pedro, Los Angeles to the Far East. She was operated by the American-Hawaiian Steamship Company. After World War II, in 1949, she was laid up in Mobile, Alabama in the National Defense Reserve Fleet.

== Korean War ==
In 1950, she was reactivated for the Korean War and operated by the American-Hawaiian Steamship Company again. She made trips to Korean between: first Sept 27, 1952 to Nov. 25, 1952, Second Dec. 2, 1952 to March 6, 1953, third June 19, 1953 to Jan. 7, 1954. She helped American forces engaged against Communist aggression in South Korea. About 75 percent of the personnel taken to Korea for the Korean War came by the merchant marine ships. SS Baylor Victory transported goods, mail, food and other supplies. About 90% of the cargo was moved by merchant marine ships to the war zone. After the Korean War, she was laid up in 1958 at the reserve fleet at the James River.

== Vietnam War ==
In July 1966, she was reactivated for Vietnam War and operated by Victory Carriers Inc. for Military Sea Transportation Service (MSTS). In 1970, she reported in at the United States Japan Fleet Activities in Yokosuka in a damaged condition due to a Pacific storm and deemed not worth repairing. SS Baylor Victory was sold to the American Ship Dismantlers Inc. on June 8, 1970. She was scrapped in Taiwan in 1970.

== See also ==
- List of Victory ships
- Liberty ship
- Type C1 ship
- Type C2 ship
- Type C3 ship

== Sources ==
- Sawyer, L.A. and W.H. Mitchell. Victory ships and tankers: The history of the ‘Victory’ type cargo ships and the tankers built in the United States of America during World War II, Cornell Maritime Press, 1974, 0-87033-182-5.
- United States Maritime Commission:
- Victory Cargo Ships
