= American Export-Isbrandtsen Lines =

American shipping company

- House flag
- Industry: Shipping
- Founded: 1919
- Defunct: 1977
- Fate: Bankruptcy
- Successor: Farrell Lines
- Headquarters: New York City, United States
- Parent: American Export Industries
- Subsidiaries: American Export Airlines; Containers Marine Lines

American Export-Isbrandtsen Lines, New York, was the leading US-flag shipping company between the U.S. east coast and the Mediterranean from 1919 to 1977, offering both cargo ship and passenger ship services, until it declared bankruptcy and was acquired by Farrell Lines of New York.

== Company history ==
=== American Export Lines (I) ===
Export Steamship Corporation was organized in 1919 and began operating cargo services to the Mediterranean from New York. The word American was added in the 1920s to emphasize its ties to the U.S. In 1931, they placed in service four cargo-passenger liners, Excalibur, Excambion, Exeter and Exochorda, known as the "Four Aces". The timing of their new service was unfortunately at the beginning of the Depression. The company went through various reorganizations and became the American Export Lines in 1936. During World War II American Export Lines operated transports for the U.S. War Shipping Administration. In 1964, it merged with Isbrandtsen Co. to become the American Export-Isbrandtsen Lines.

=== Isbrandtsen Steamship Company ===
In 1917, Hans Isbrandtsen formed a shipping company name Hans Isbrandtsen Inc. in Delaware and the Pan American Terminal & Dock Corporation in New York City. The shipping company underwent changes when Hans Isbrandtsen and his cousin A. P. Møller, the shipping magnate who formed the great Maersk Line, began a joint venture in 1919 forming the Isbrandtsen-Moller Company (ISMOLCO) in New York. ISMOLCO grew rapidly when in 1928, a long-term agreement was reached with Ford Motor Corporation, shipping auto parts and general cargo for Japan, China and the Philippines via the Panama Canal. Isbrandtsen founded the Isbrandtsen Steamship Company in 1939 to operate ships in areas where ISMOLCO was not involved. In 1940, this joint venture dramatically transformed due to "Permanent Special Instructions One" issued by Møller, upon which A. P. Møller's son Mærsk Mc-Kinney Møller was made a partner. In 1941, the joint venture ended. Møller and his son went on to found the Interseas Shipping Co., Inc., the predecessor to the Moller Steamship Company, an agent for the Mærsk Line in the United States While Interseas Shipping Co., Inc., operated mainly in the Atlantic, Isbrandtsen Steamship Company traded mainly in the Far East. Hans's son Jakob took over the company in 1953 upon Hans's passing and bought American Export Lines in 1960. The purchase was approved by the United States Maritime Administration in 1962. Jakob Isbrandtsen merged Isbrandtsen Co. with American Export Lines in 1964 to form American Export & Isbrandtsen Lines, which a year later changed its name to American Export-Isbrandtsen Lines.

In the 1950s Jakob Isbrandtsen was approached by Andrés Andai, a Hungarian immigrant in Chile involved in iron mining. They formed a partnership where Isbrandtsen gained exclusive rights to transport Andai's Chilean iron ore to the United States where he had a deal with United Steel, while Isbrandtsen also injected capital to Andai's company Compañía Minera Santa Fe gaining a 40% stake in it. This business model was later in 1966 denounced in the National Congress of Chile by Senator Aniceto Rodríguez as "suspicious". After Andai's death in 1960 Isbrandtsen sold its stakes to Philipp Brothers which came to own 90% of Compañia Minera Santa Fe.

=== American Export-Isbrandtsen Lines ===
Jakob Isbrandtsen formed the American Export-Isbrandtsen Lines in 1964 by merging his two shipping companies. Also in 1964, Isbrandtsen, who became a majority stake holder in Ward Industries in 1960, restructured it and in 1967 formed American Export Industries, Inc., a holding company to manage American Export-Isbrandtsen Lines and all support for his fleet operations, including container services, port operations and fleet logistics. In 1971, American Export Industries spun off its holdings and returned to being the American Export-Isbrandtsen Lines. This merger ended in 1973.

=== American Export Lines (II) ===
American Export Lines (AEL), re-emerged after the dissolution of the American Export-Isbrandtsen Lines in 1973. AEL sold their Staten Island Marine Terminal to the City of New York in 1974. After heavy losses and unable to meet crippling debt payments, AEL went into bankruptcy in July 1977, with Farrell Lines buying its port operations in New York City and its remaining ships a year later, including two container ships on order or already under construction at Bath Iron Works, the Argonaut and Resolute, which were delivered directly to Farrell. Farrell Lines was acquired by Royal P&O Nedlloyd in July 2000; in turn, Royal P&O Nedlloyd was acquired by A.P. Moller-Maersk Group in August 2005. The port operations formerly associated with the American Export-Isbrandtsen Lines became part of the Dubai Ports World controversy in February 2006.

== Passenger shipping services ==
Their first passenger ships were actually combination passenger-cargo ships, known as "Four Aces", Excalibur, Exeter, Excambion and Exochorda. These ships were ordered built by AEL during the time when the company's president was Henry Herbman, an old-time dockman in New York. They were built by the New York Shipbuilding Company, headed up by Clinton L. Bardo, and first launched in 1931. However, Herbman was not a good businessman and the ships had not been paid for. J. E. Slater, who was with the consulting firm Coverdale and Colpitts of New York City, was asked to look into their finances, and he quickly found that the business was not being run efficiently. Finally the Maritime Commission removed Herbman from his position and J. E. Slater was asked to run the company for a few years to stabilize it. The company's financial position improved significantly, assisted by a life insurance policy Herbman had bought himself, which was paid to the company and settled the debt problem. (This information was found in Slater's taped memoirs which were passed on to his children and grandchildren.) With the exception of the Exochorda, the ships were lost during World War II as a result of enemy fire. The Exochorda was later sold to Turkish Maritime Lines and renamed Tarsus.

Following the war, the tonnage was replaced with C-3 class troop transports with the same names. They were given luxury appointments for 125 passengers as well as sufficient cargo-carrying capacity.

The crowning achievement in American Export's passenger services were their largest and best-known liners, the twin ships SS Constitution and SS Independence. The vessels were designed in their entirety by Henry Dreyfuss and the names were chosen by a competition. O. J. "Skip" Weber, Slater's son-in-law, entered both names and won the prize. The ship was "sponsored" at its launching by Mrs. John E. (Pauline) Slater. The famous 1957 movie "An Affair to Remember" was filmed on the SS Constitution. On April 4, 1956, Grace Kelly sailed on the SS Constitution when she traveled to Monaco to wed Prince Rainier.

== Subsidiaries ==
- American Export Airlines
- Colonial Tankers Corporation
- Container Marine Lines Isbrandtsen
- Container Marine Lines

== Ships ==
- SS Adelphi Victory (MCV-760) (operated by Isbrandtsen Line), VC2-S-AP2
- SS American Victory (MCV-792), VC2-S-AP2
- SS Antioch Victory (MCV-816) (operated by Isbrandtsen Line), VC2-S-AP2
- SS Atlantic, C4 type
- SS Baylor Victory (MCV-772) (operated by Isbrandtsen Line), VC2-S-AP2
- SS Beaver Victory (operated by Isbrandtsen Line)
- SS Horace Binney (MCE-62) (operated by American Export Lines Inc.)
- SS Blair (assigned to Export Steamship Corp.), renamed SS Exchange (1)
- SS Blue Triangle (assigned to Export Steamship Corp.), renamed SS Exmouth (1)
- SS Brandon Victory (operated by Isbrandtsen Line)
- SS Brimsen Heights, transferred in 1946, formerly known as SS American Banker of the United States Lines
- SS Adm. Wm. M. Callaghan (operated by American Export-Isbrandtsen Lines)
- SS Cape Nome
- SS Cape Race
- SS Carenco (assigned to Export Steamship Corp.)
- SS Charles Carroll (MCE-15) (operated by American Export Lines Inc.)
- SS Caspiana (operated by Isbrandtsen Line)
- SS City of Athens
- SS City of St. Joseph (assigned to Export Steamship Corp.), renamed SS Extavia (1)
- SS Clontarf (assigned to Export Steamship Corp.), renamed SS Exermont (1)
- SS Coeur D’Alene (assigned to Export Steamship Corp.), renamed SS Examilia
- SS Coeur d'Alene Victory (operated by Isbrandtsen Line)
- SS Colby Victory (operated by Isbrandtsen Line)
- SS Constitution
- SS Container Dispatcher container ship
- SS Container Forwarder container ship
- SS Corson (assigned to Export Steamship Corp.), renamed SS Exiria (1)
- SS Defiance
- Delta King (owned by Isbrandtsen Line)
- Delta Queen (owned by Isbrandtsen Line)
- SS East Point Victory (operated by Isbrandtsen Line)
- SS Elmira Victory (operated by Isbrandtsen Line)
- SS Empire Glencoe
- SS Eugene Hale (MCE-791) (operated by American Export Lines Inc.)
- SS Examelia
- SS Examiner (1)
- SS Examiner (2)
- SS Exanthia (1)
- SS Exanthia (2), C2-S-A1, Maritime Commission design
- SS Exarch
- SS Exbrook
- SS Excalibur (1) (photo)
- SS Excalibur (2)
- SS Excambion (1)
- SS Excambion (2)
- SS Excellency (1)
- SS Excellency (2)
- SS Excellency (3)
- SS Exceller, C2-S-A1, Maritime Commission design
- SS Excello (1)
- SS Excello (2)
- SS Excelsior (1)
- SS Excelsior (2)
- SS Excelsior (3)
- SS Excelsior (4)
- SS Exchange (1), renamed SS Exliona (2)
- SS Exchange (2)
- SS Exchequer (1) (photo)
- SS Exchequer (2)
- SS Exchequer (3)
- SS Exchester (1)
- SS Exchester (2)
- SS Exchester (3), renamed SS Exmoor (3)
- SS Exchester (4)
- SS Exchester (5)
- SS Executive
- SS Executor (1)
- SS Executor (2)
- SS Exemplar
- SS Exermont (1), C3-E, Maritime Commission design
- SS Exermont (2)
- SS Exeter (1)
- SS Exeter (2)
- SS Exford (1)
- SS Exford (2)
- SS Exhibitor (1)
- SS Exhibitor (2)
- SS Exilona (1)
- SS Exilona (2)
- SS Exilona (3)
- SS Exiria (1), renamed SS Exchester (3)
- SS Exiria (2), C2-S-A1, Maritime Commission design
- SS Exminster (1)
- SS Exminster (2)
- SS Exmoor (1)
- SS Exmoor (2)
- SS Exmoor (3)
- SS Exmouth (1)
- SS Exmouth (2)
- SS Exochorda (1)
- SS Exochorda (2)
- SS Expeditor
- SS Explorer
- SS Export Adventurer
- SS Export Agent
- SS Export Aide
- SS Export Ambassador
- SS Export Banner
- SS Export Bay
- SS Export Builder
- SS Export Buyer
- SS Export Challenger
- SS Export Champion
- SS Export Commerce
- SS Export Courier
- SS Export Defender
- SS Export Democracy
- SS Export Diplomat
- CV Export Freedom IMO 7204863, container ship
- CV Export Leader IMO 7226689, container ship, (MA-257), now the US Navy's SS Gopher State (T-ACS-4)
- CV Export Patriot IMO 7306764, container ship, operated by Farrell Lines until 1998, scrapped in Alang India.
- SS Exporter (1)
- SS Exporter (2), C3-E, Maritime Commission design
- SS Expositor
- SS Express (1)
- SS Express (2)
- SS Express (3)
- SS Extavia (1), renamed as SS Exmoor (2)
- SS Extavia (2), C2-S-A1, Maritime Commission design
- SS Exton (1)
- SS Exton (2)
- SS Exton (3)
- SS Faraby
- SS William P. Fessenden (MCE-768) (operated by American Export Lines Inc.)
- SS Flying Arrow
- SS Flying Clipper
- SS Flying Cloud
- SS Flying Eagle
- SS Flying Endeavor
- SS Flying Enterprise (1)
- SS Flying Enterprise (2)
- SS Flying Fish, a modified C-2 type cargo ship
- SS Flying Gull
- SS Flying Hawk
- SS Flying Foam
- SS Flying Independent
- SS Flying Spray
- SS Flying Trader
- SS Samuel Gorton (MCE-1459) (operated by American Export Lines Inc.)
- SS Great Republic
- SS Hannis Taylor (MCE-1978) (operated by Isbrandtsen Steamship Co.Inc.)
- SS Hog Island
- SS Robert F. Hoke (MCE-1968) (operated by American Export Lines Inc.)
- SS Hoke Smith (MCE-1061) (operated by American Export Lines Inc.)
- SS Independence
- SS John Chandler (MCE-215) (operated by American Export Lines Inc.)
- SS Sir John Franklin
- SS John L. Motley (MCE-986) (operated by American Export Lines Inc.)
- SS John N. Robins (MCE-819) (operated by American Export Lines Inc.)
- SS Judge Bland
- SS Kingston Victory (operated by Isbrandtsen Line)
- SS La Guardia
- SS Lahaina Victory (operated by Isbrandtsen Line)
- SS Lake Festina
- SS Lake Fiscus
- SS Lake Frumet
- SS Lake Grampus
- SS Liberty Land
- CV Lightning IMO 6817845, container ship, now the US Navy's SS Flickertail State (T-ACS-5)
- SS Luxpalile
- SS Marine Angel
- SS Marine Carp
- SS Marine Flasher
- SS Marine Jumper
- SS Marine Perch
- SS Marine Shark
- SS Martin Berhman
- SS Meredith Victory
- SS Meridian Victory
- SS Michael J. Owens (MCE-2958) (operated by American Export Lines Inc.)
- SS Millinocket, torpedoed June 18, 1942
- SS Minot Victory (operated by Isbrandtsen Line)
- SS New Orleans
- SS Niantic Victory (MCV-100) (operated by Isbrandtsen Line)
- SS Nobles
- SS Notre Dame Victory (operated by Isbrandtsen Line)
- SS Orion Hunter (operated by Isbrandtsen Line)
- SS A. Mitchell Palmer (MCE-2436) (operated by Isbrandtsen Steamship Co.Inc.)
- SS Pass Christian Victory (operated by Isbrandtsen Line)
- SS Remsen Heights
- SS Red Jacket
- SS Darel M. Ritter (MCE-2838) (operated by American Export Lines Inc.)
- SS Sangamon
- SS Saucon
- SS Saugus
- NS Savannah
- SS Sawokla
- SS Sea Falcon
- CV Sea Witch IMO 6806444, container ship
- SS Seton Hall Victory (operated by Isbrandtsen Line)
- SS Siboney
- SS Sinsinawa
- CV Staghound IMO 6916433, container ship, now the US Navy's SS Cornhusker State (T-ACS-6)
- SS Unicoi
- SS Zebulon B. Vance (MCE-145) (operated by American Export Lines Inc.)
- SS Vulcania
- SS Charles D. Walcott (MCE-2327) (operated by American Export Lines Inc.)
- SS Ward
- SS Will R. Wood (MCE-1956) (operated by American Export Lines Inc.)
- SS Winona
- SS Young America

== List of principal executives ==
- Henry Herbermann, 1920–1935
- William Hugh Coverdale, 1934–1949
- John E. Slater, 1934–1956
- John F. Gehan, 1939–1959
- William J. Dorman, 1952–1965
- Frazer A. Bailey, 1957–1959
- Josephine Bay Paul, 1959–1960
- Jakob Isbrandtsen, 1960–1971
- John M. Will, 1959–1971

== See also ==
- South Street Seaport Museum, where Jakob Isbrandtsen served as its trustee
