= John M. Will =

United States Navy Vice admiral

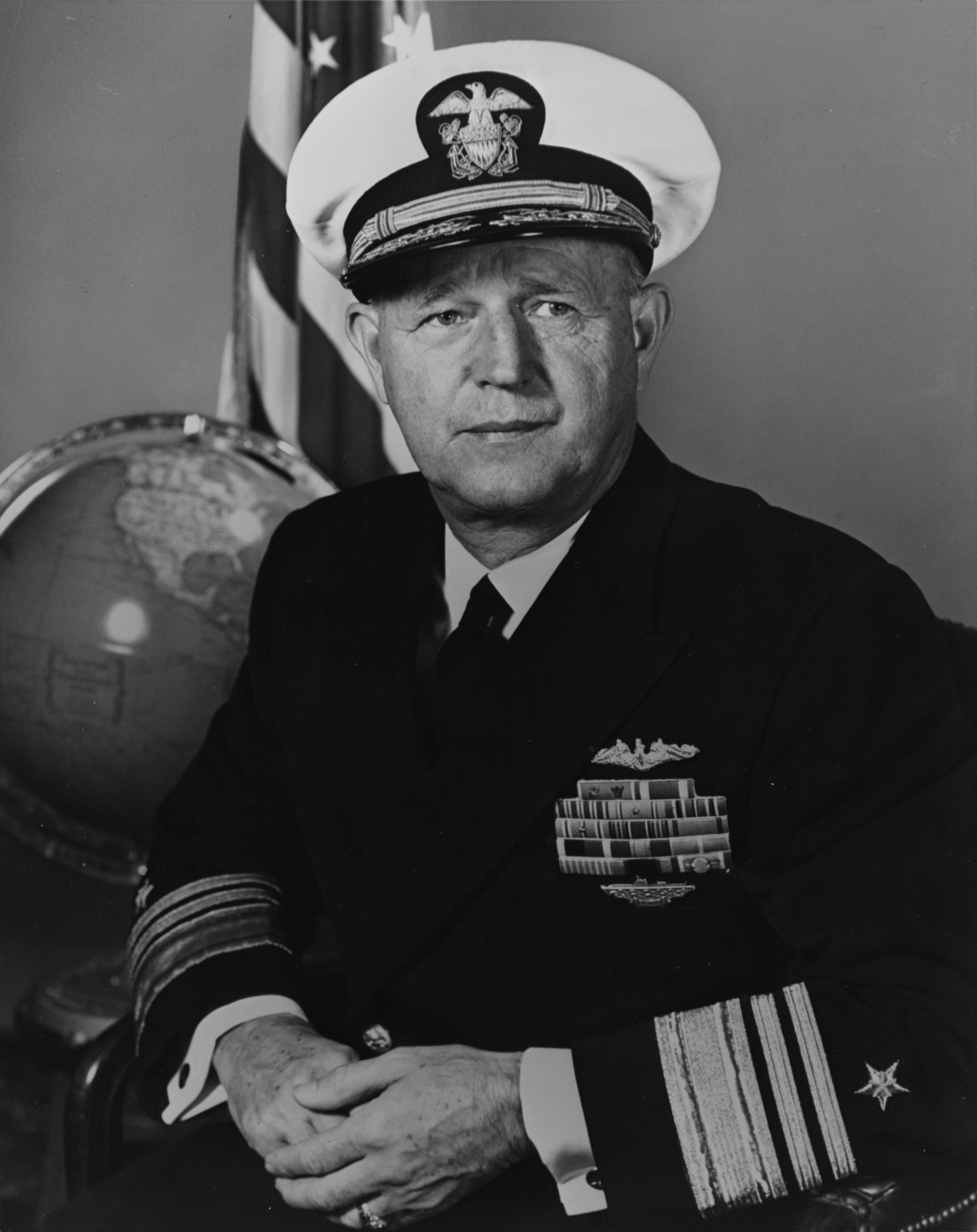
- John M. Will on 4 November 1956
- Born: 15 September 1899; Perth Amboy, New Jersey, US
- Died: 5 May 1981 (aged 81); Bethesda, Maryland, US
- Military career
- Allegiance: United States
- Branch: U.S. Navy
- Service years: 19xx - 1959
- Rank: Vice Admiral
- Conflicts: World War II
- Awards: Legion of Merit (3)

John Mylin Will (15 September 1899 – 5 May 1981) was an American naval officer, President of American Export-Isbrandtsen Lines, commander-in-chief of Submarine Force, U.S. Pacific Fleet in World War II, and Vice admiral of the United States Navy who subsequently served commanding officer of the United States Seventh Fleet at Midway Atoll and Guam, and retired full admiral.

Mylin was assigned to Bureau of Naval Personnel where he served training-director as well as commanding officer of cruiser Columbus. Besides serving in the naval department, he was the president and later, chairman of the Arthur Tickle Engineering Works Inc.

== Biography ==
Mylin was born in September 1899 at Perth Amboy, New Jersey and later, moved to Deerfield, Virginia and New York. In 1923, Mylin did his graduation from the U.S. Naval Academy at Annapolis and later attended Pennsylvania State University where he did master's degree. In 1949, he served commander of the Military Sea Transportation Service at Atlantic, and later, promoted to director of personnel policy for Secretary of Defense office. In 1956, he was assigned to the Military Sealift Command as an commanding officer until he retired from the naval department as full admiral.

== Awards ==
The President of United States of that time conferred Legion of Merit military decoration upon Captain Will for his contribution to the US during World War II. Vice-admiral received second Legion of Merit for his contribution to Cold War and later, Admiral Will was awarded with the third Legion of Merit award.

== Death ==
Mylin was suffering from cancer, and was subsequently admitted in a military hospital for necessary medical treatment. On 5 May 1981, he died at Walter Reed National Military Medical Center in Bethesda, Maryland. His wife Louise Ley Will died on 31 March 1968, eight years before Mylin's death.
