= SS John R. McQuigg =

World War II Liberty ship of the United States

History

United States
- Name: John R. McQuigg
- Namesake: John R. McQuigg
- Owner: War Shipping Administration (WSA)
- Operator: American South African Lines, Inc.
- Ordered: as type (EC2-S-C1) hull, MC hull 2311
- Builder: J.A. Jones Construction, Panama City, Florida
- Cost: $1,107,976
- Yard number: 52
- Way number: 2
- Laid down: 14 June 1944
- Launched: 19 July 1944
- Sponsored by: Mrs. John R. McQuigg
- Completed: 31 July 1944
- Identification: Call Signal: WRQB
- Fate: Laid up in National Defense Reserve Fleet, Hudson River Group, 1 June 1946; Sold to Italy, 16 December 1946

Italy
- Name: Villa Di Brugine
- Owner: Italian Commission
- Acquired: 27 December 1946
- Fate: Scrapped, 1968

General characteristics
- Class & type: Liberty ship; type EC2-S-C1, standard
- Tonnage: 10,865 LT DWT; 7,176 GRT
- Displacement: 3,380 long tons (3,434 t) (light); 14,245 long tons (14,474 t) (max)
- Length: 441 feet 6 inches (135 m) oa; 416 feet (127 m) pp; 427 feet (130 m) lwl
- Beam: 57 feet (17 m)
- Draft: 27 ft 9.25 in (8.4646 m)
- Installed power: 2 × Oil fired 450 °F (232 °C) boilers, operating at 220 psi (1,500 kPa); 2,500 hp (1,900 kW)
- Propulsion: 1 × triple-expansion steam engine, (manufactured by General Machinery Corp., Hamilton, Ohio); 1 × screw propeller
- Speed: 11.5 knots (21.3 km/h; 13.2 mph)
- Capacity: 562,608 cubic feet (15,931 m^{3}) (grain); 499,573 cubic feet (14,146 m^{3}) (bale)
- Complement: 38–62 USMM; 21–40 USNAG
- Armament: Varied by ship; Bow-mounted 3-inch (76 mm)/50-caliber gun; Stern-mounted 4-inch (102 mm)/50-caliber gun; 2–8 × single 20-millimeter (0.79 in) Oerlikon anti-aircraft (AA) cannons and/or, 2–8 × 37-millimeter (1.46 in) M1 AA guns

SS John R. McQuigg was a Liberty ship built in the United States during World War II. She was named after John R. McQuigg, the National Commander of the American Legion, 1925–1926.

== Construction ==
John R. McQuigg was laid down on 14 June 1944, under a United States Maritime Commission (MARCOM) contract, MC hull 2311, by J.A. Jones Construction, Panama City, Florida; she was sponsored by Mrs. John R. McQuigg, the widow of the namesake, and launched on 19 July 1944.

== History ==
She was allocated to the American South African Lines, Inc., on 31 July 1944. On 1 June 1946, she was laid up in the National Defense Reserve Fleet, in the Hudson River Group. On 16 December 1946, she was transferred to the Italian Government, which in turn sold her to the Italian Commission, for $555,667.40, on 27 December 1946. She was renamed Villa Di Brugine. In 1968, she was scrapped.

== Bibliography ==
- "Jones Construction, Panama City FL". ShipbuildingHistory.com. 13 October 2010.
- Maritime Administration. "John R. McQuigg". Ship History Database Vessel Status Card. U.S. Department of Transportation, Maritime Administration. Archived from the original on 12 December 2019.
- Davies, James (May 2004). "Specifications (As-Built)" (PDF). p. 23.
- "SS John R. McQuigg".
