= Bowron =

Bowron may refer to:

== People ==
- Edgar Peters Bowron (born 1943), American art historian and curator
- Eljay B. Bowron (born 1951), Director of the United States Secret Service
- Fletcher Bowron (1887–1968), four-term reform mayor of Los Angeles, California
- James Bowron (1844–1928), chairman of the Gulf States Steel Corporation
- Jessica Bowron, acting director of the United States National Park Service
- Joseph Bowron (1809–1868), member of the Wisconsin State Assembly
- Liam Bowron (born 2003), Australian rugby union player
- Mike Bowron, retired British police officer

== Other ==
- Bowron Clearcut, a clearcut in British Columbia
- Bowron Lake Provincial Park, provincial park in British Columbia, Canada
- Bowron River originates in Bowron Lake Provincial Park and flows north to join the Fraser River
