= John J. Farrell (businessman) =

American business executive (1890–1966)

- Born: John Joseph Farrell; April 28, 1890; Brooklyn, New York, U.S.
- Died: April 22, 1966 (aged 75); Darien, Connecticut, U.S.
- Education: Yale College
- Occupation: Shipping Executive
- Known for: Co-founder of Farrell Lines
- Spouse: Mary Maud Hadden (m.1900–1966)
- Father: James A. Farrell
- Relatives: James A. Farrell, Jr. (brother)

John Joseph Farrell (April 28, 1890 – April 22, 1966) was an American shipping line executive.

Farrell was the son of James A. Farrell, president of the United States Steel Corporation. In 1940, while serving as president of the Argonaut Line, he merged the company with the American South African Line, which was led by his brother, James A. Farrell Jr.. The resulting company was renamed Farrell Lines, consolidating the family’s maritime interests into a single entity.
