= Bernard Carter =

Bernard Carter may refer to:

- Bernard Carter (banker) (1893–1961), American soldier and banker
- Bernard Carter (American football) (born 1971), American football linebacker
- SS Bernard Carter, a Liberty ship
