= Flickertail =

Flickertail may refer to:

- Richardson's Ground Squirrel or Flickertail, a North American ground squirrel in the genus Urocitellus
- North Dakota, nicknamed the "Flickertail State"
- SS Flickertail State, a crane ship in ready reserve for the United States Navy
