= Massachusetts Burma Law =

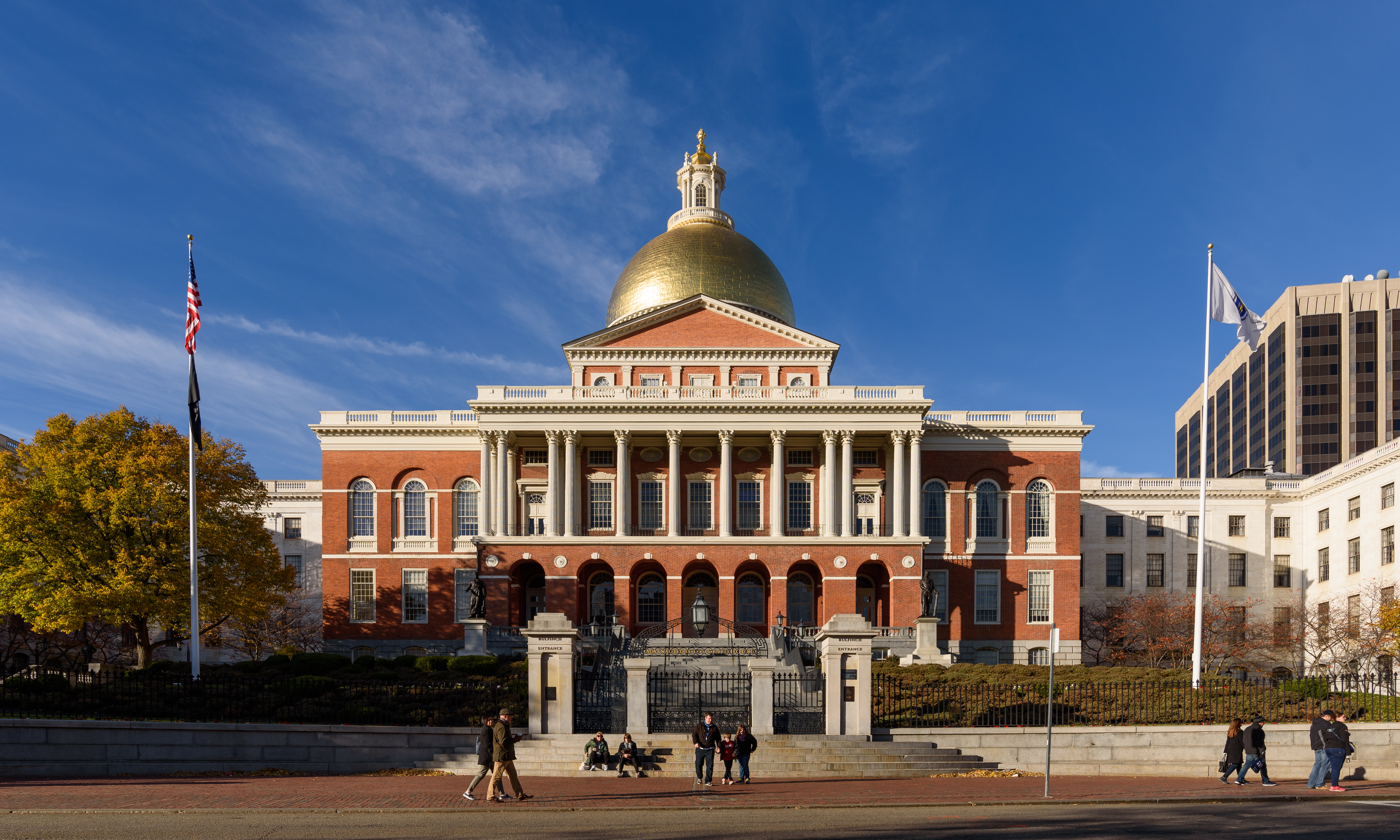
Massachusetts State House

The Massachusetts Burma Law was a law enacted in 1996 by the Massachusetts General Court limiting state entities from purchasing services from companies doing business with Myanmar (Burma). This law was enacted three months before the introduction of federal sanctions on trade with Burma.

The law was modeled on similar state and local laws from the 1980s used elsewhere in the United States to give expression to anti-apartheid objectives. After Massachusetts' restricted trade list added 34 members of the National Foreign Trade Council (NFTC), the trade association sued the Secretary of Administration and Finance of Massachusetts, Stephen Crosby, arguing that the Massachusetts Burma Law was subject to federal preemption. In Crosby v. National Foreign Trade Council (2000), the Supreme Court unanimously sided with the NFTC, ending enforcement of the Massachusetts Burma Law.

== See also ==
- Federalism
- Supremacy Clause
- 179th Massachusetts General Court (1995–1996)
