= SS Gopher State =

Crane ship

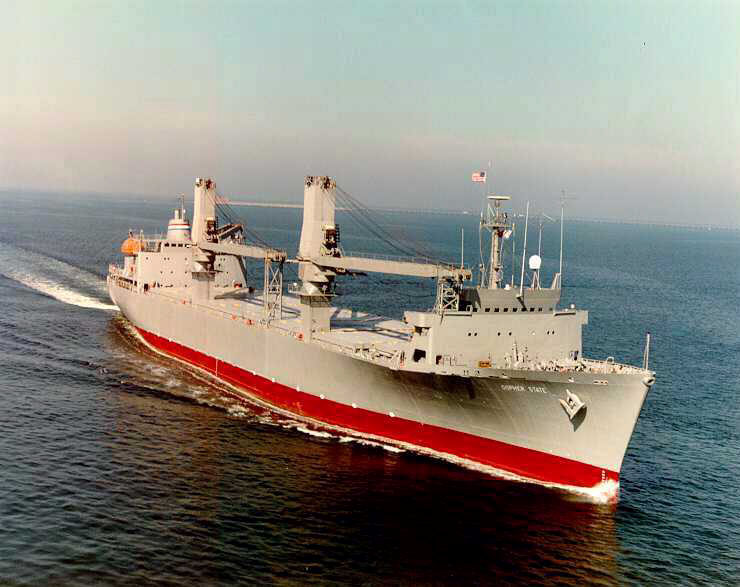
- SS Gopher State (T-ACS-4)

History

United States
- Name: Export Leader
- Owner: United States Maritime Administration
- Operator: (1973) American Export-Isbrandtsen Lines; (1973-1978) American Export Lines; (1978-1986) Farrell Lines
- Ordered: 20 October 1970
- Builder: Bath Iron Works
- Laid down: 26 July 1971
- Launched: 8 July 1972
- In service: 22 January 1973
- Out of service: 1986 laid up
- Home port: Newport News, VA
- Identification: IMO number: 7226689
- Fate: Acquired by the United States Navy

United States
- Name: Gopher State (T-ACS-4)
- Namesake: Named in honor of the state of Minnesota.
- Acquired: 1986
- In service: 12 October 1987 to the present
- Identification: IMO number: 7226689; MMSI number: 366575000; Callsign: WCJV
- Notes: Five days needed to activate.

General characteristics
- Class & type: Gopher State-class crane ship
- Displacement: 13900 tons (light); 31500 tons (full)
- Length: 668 ft 7 in
- Beam: 76 ft 1 in
- Draft: 33 ft 6 in
- Propulsion: Steam turbines; 2 boilers; 1 shaft single propeller; 17,500 shp
- Speed: 17 knots
- Capacity: 300 plus containers; four 30 ton capacity cranes
- Complement: 9 civilian during Reduced Operating Status; 32 civilian during Full Operating Status

SS Gopher State (T-ACS-4) is a crane ship in ready reserve for the United States Navy. The ship was named for the state of Minnesota, which is also known as the Gopher State.

Gopher State is currently moored at the Philadelphia Navy Yard in Philadelphia, PA.

== History ==
Gopher State was laid down on 26 July 1971, as the container ship Export Leader, ON 545126, IMO 7226689, a Maritime Administration type C5-S-73b hull under MARAD contract (MA 257). Built by Bath Iron Works, Bath, Maine, hull no. 358, she was launched on 8 July 1972, and delivered to MARAD 22 January 1973, entering service for American Export-Isbrandtsen Lines (renamed American Export Lines in the same year). She was sold to Farrell Lines in 1978 without name change. The ship was returned to MARAD in 1986 and laid up in the National Defense Reserve Fleet (NDRF). In 1987 she was converted to a type C5-S-MA73c crane ship by Norfolk Shipbuilding & Drydock, Norfolk, Virginia. Completed on 12 October 1987, she was placed in service as Gopher State (T-ACS-4) and assigned to the Ready Reserve Force (RRF), under operation control of the Military Sealift Command (MSC).

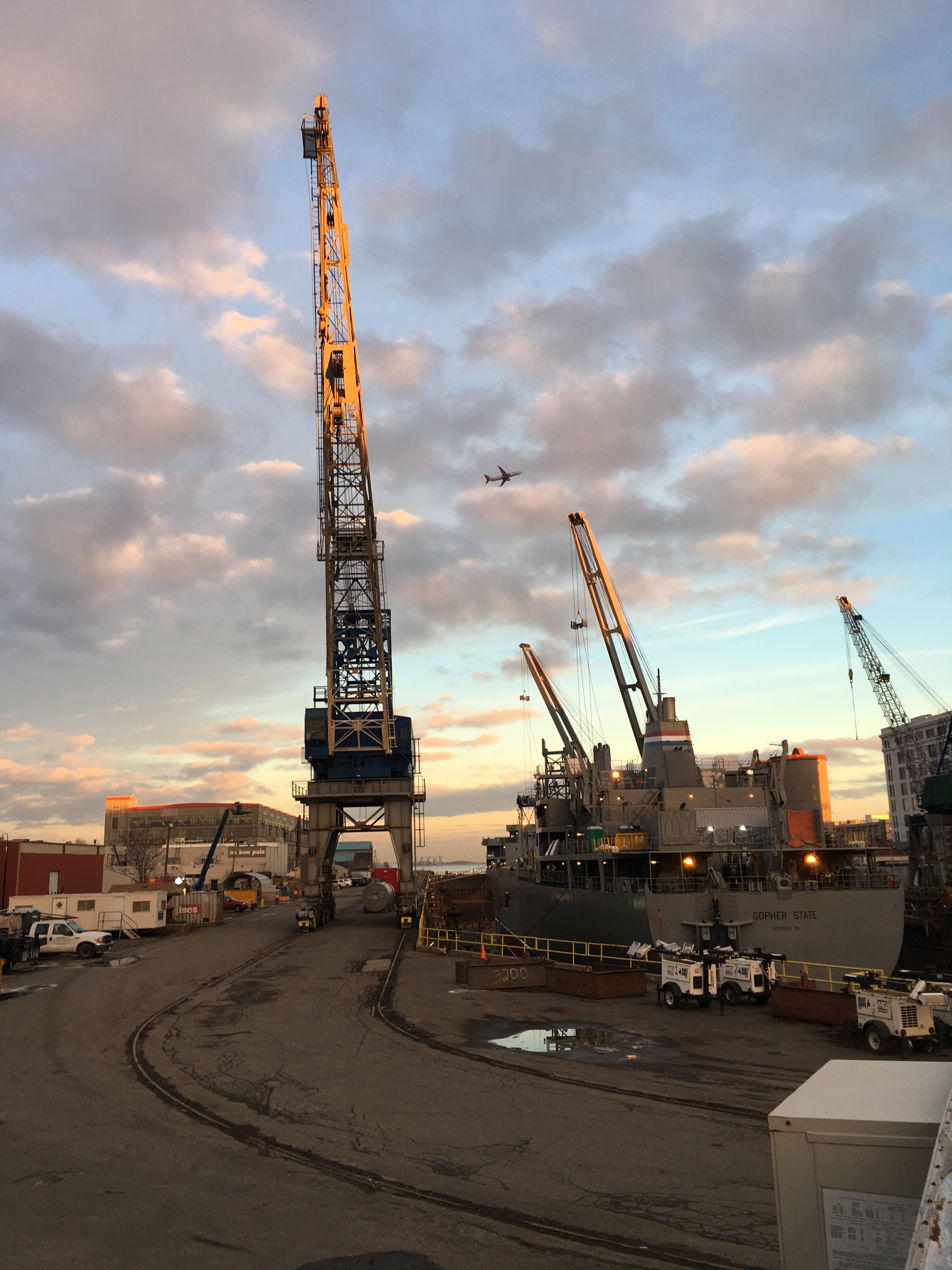
Gopher State in Boston's dry dock number 3 in December 2016

Gopher State is in ready reserve, laid up at Newport News, Virginia. As of December 2016, she is in Drydock No. 3 in Boston.

== See also ==
- Operation Steel Box
