= Type C5 ship =

MARAD ship designation

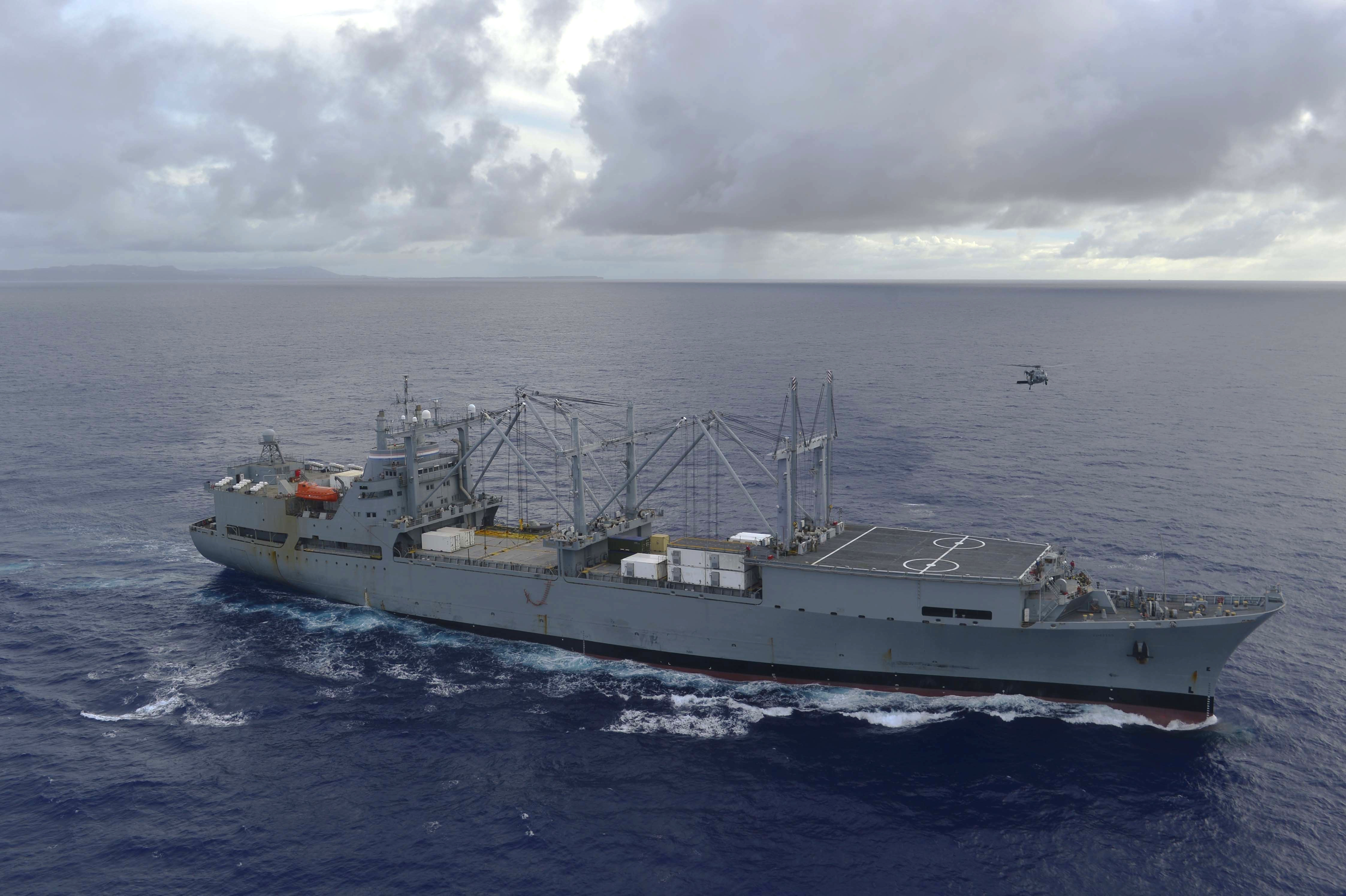
- SS Curtiss, a type C5-S-78a-class ship

Class overview
- Builders: Bethlehem Steel, Sparrows Point, Maryland
- Planned: 12
- Completed: 8

General characteristics C5 class
- Type: Dry bulk cargo ship
- Tonnage: 24,250 DWT
- Length: 583 ft (178 m) oa
- Beam: 78 ft (24 m)
- Draft: 34 ft (10 m)
- Installed power: 11,000 shp (8,200 kW)
- Propulsion: Steam turbines
- Speed: 16 knots (30 km/h; 18 mph)
- Range: 12,000 nmi (22,000 km; 14,000 mi)
- Capacity: Cargo: 420,284 ft^{3} (11,901.1 m^{3}); Fuel oil, forward, full 5,719 bbl; Fuel oil, aft, full 7,894 bbl
- Crew: 63

The Type C5 ship is a United States Maritime Administration (MARAD) designation for World War II breakbulk cargo and later a container ship for containerization shipments. The first type C5-class ship was a class of ships constructed and produced in the United States during World War II. The World War II C5-class ship was dry bulk cargo ship built by Bethlehem Steel in Sparrows Point, Maryland. Bethlehem Steel built eight ships in this bulk cargo class and four orders were canceled. The C5-class ship has a 24,250 DWT and was 560 feet (170 m) long. The C5 was mainly used as iron ore carriers. The C5 was needed to replace other ships that sank during World War II. First in her class was SS Venore, USMC #1982, delivered on 20 July 1945. The Type C5-class ship designed to fill the need to move iron ore from Santa Cruz, Chile, to Sparrows Point, Maryland, through the Panama Canal, a round-trip of 8,700 nautical miles (16,100 km; 10,000 mi). Post World War II, four ships were given C5 class type C5-S-78a, these were roll-on/roll-off container ship built by Ingalls Shipbuilding, Inc. of Pascagoula, Mississippi and operated by the Moore-McCormack Lines. The C5-S-78a had a deadweight tonnage of 16,000 tons.

== Ships in class ==
=== Ordered during World War II ===
- C5-S AX1 C5 iron ore carriers, 1948.
  - Venore, USMC #1982, Hull 4411, scrapped 1970
  - Marore, USMC #1983, Hull 4412, scrapped 1970
  - Lebore, USMC #1984, Hull 4413, converted to container ship 1966, scrapped 1972
  - Feltore, USMC #1985, Hull 4414, converted to container ship 1967, scrapped 1971
  - Chilore, Hull 4445, scrapped 1970
  - Santore, Hull 4446, scrapped 1970
  - Cubore, Hull 4457, scrapped 1980
  - Baltore, Hull 4458, converted to barge in 1981

=== Post World War II ===
- C5-S-78a container ship 1968
  - SS Curtiss (T-AVB-4) laid down on 1 April 1968 at Ingalls Shipbuilding, Inc. of Pascagoula, Mississippi as SS Mormacksky, Maritime Commission type C5-S-78a.
  - SS Mormacstar, a Maritime Administration, roll-on/roll-off container ship. renamed: SS Red Jacket, SS American Rapid, SS Rapid, Cape Nome, and SS Cape Nome (AK-1014), 3 April 2002, laid up in the National Defense Reserve Fleet, James River Group.
  - SS Mormacsea 1969 roll-on/roll-off container ship, renamed Defiance in 1978, renamed American Rover in 1982, renamed Rover in 1983 and scrapped in 1993 at Alang, India.
  - SS Mormacsun 1970 roll-on/roll-off container ship, renamed SS Young America in 1970, renamed SS Wright (T-AVB-3) in 1986, in active service.

=== Conversions ===
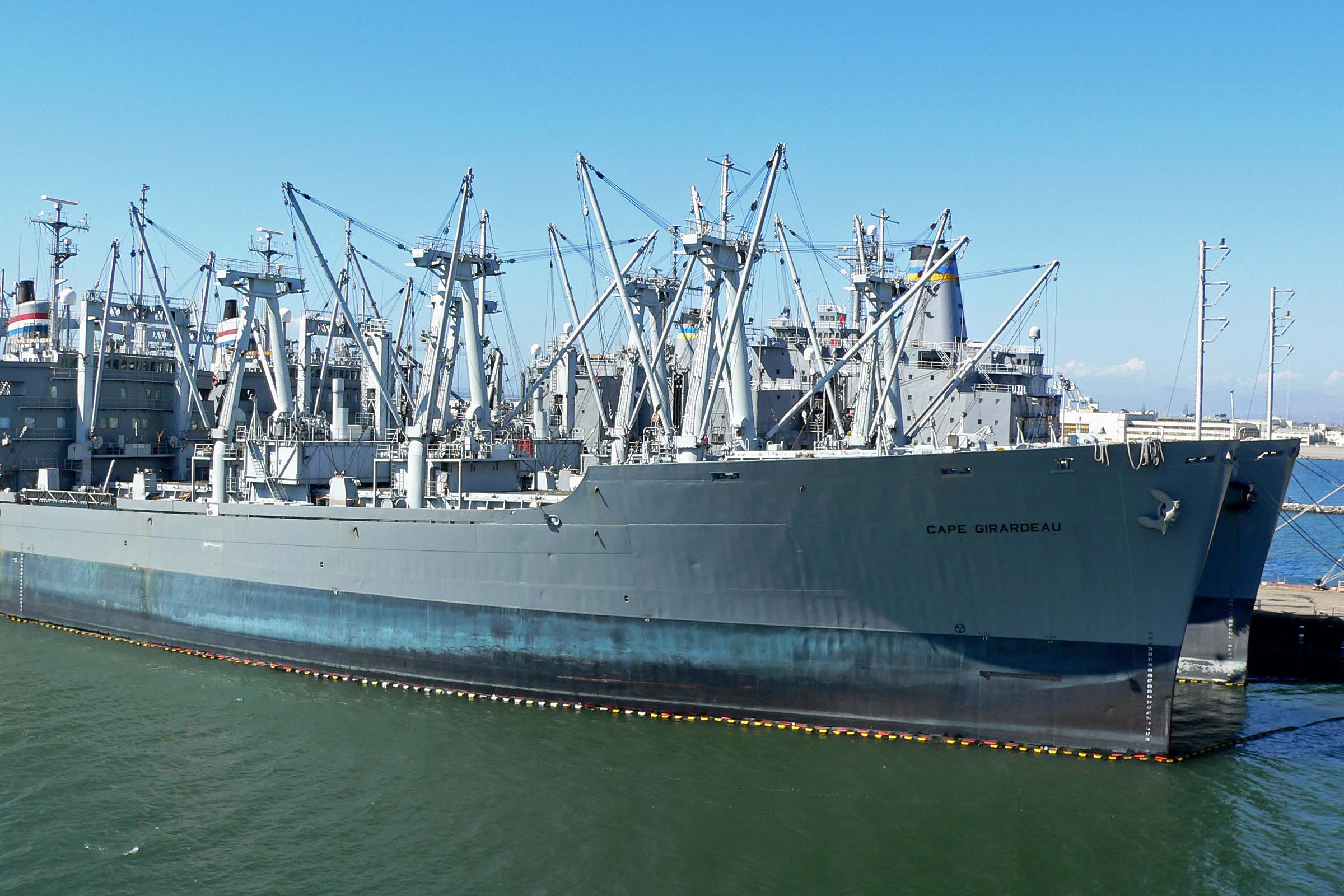
SS Cape Girardeau, a C5-S-75a at Alameda

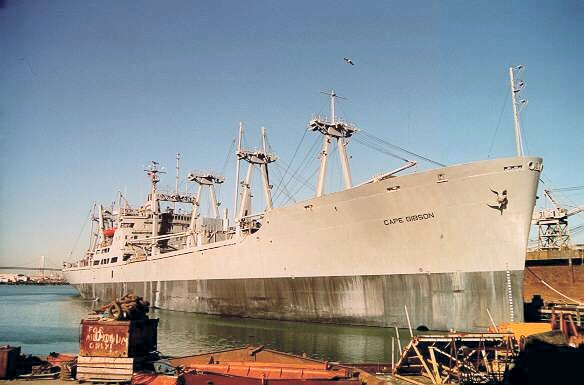
Former Merchant Marine Academy flagship SS Cape Gibson, ex-SS Indian Mail a C5-S-75a

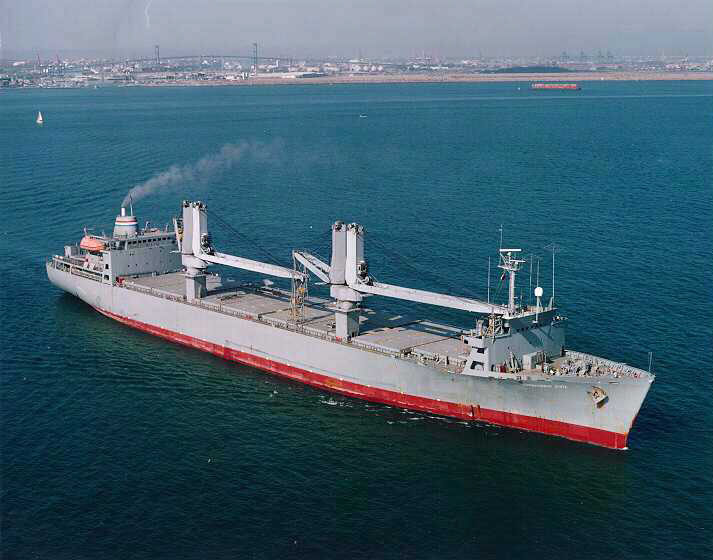
SS Cornhusker State, ex C.V. Stag Hound, a C5-S-73b conversion

- C5-S-37e conversions
- Some C3-S-37a cargo ships were modified in the 1970s to a new C5-S-37e design by the Todd Shipyards Corp., Galveston, Texas. C3-class ships was lengthened by 97.5 feet (29.7 m) to be a class C5.
  - James Lykes 1960, scrapped in 1995.
  - Joseph Lykes 1960, scrapped in 1996.
  - Zoella Lykes 1960, scrapped 1995 at Alang.
  - John Lykes 1960, scrapped 1995 at Alang.
  - Thompson Lykes 1960, rebuilt into a barge in 1994.
- C5-S-73b, Sea Witch class, built by Bath Iron Works for American Export-Isbrandtsen Lines 1968. holds 928 20 ft (6.1 m) containers.
  - C.V.Lightning, converted to C5-S-MA73c, crane ship renamed Flickertail State (T-ACS-5)
  - C.V.Sea Witch, later converted into a chemical carrier, renamed SS Chemical Pioneer
  - C.V.Stag Hound, converted to C5-S-MA73c, crane ship renamed SS Cornhusker State (T-ACS-6)
  - Export Freedom scrapped in 1997 at Alang
  - Export Leader, converted to C5-S-MA73c, crane ship renamed SS Gopher State (T-ACS-4)
  - Export Patriot, scrapped in 1998
- C5-S-MA73c is the Gopher State-class crane ship made for the Military Sealift Command, converted by Norfolk SB & DD Company at Norfolk, Virginia
- C5-S-75a built by Newport News Shipbuilding & Drydock Co., Newport News, Virginia for the American Mail Line of Seattle, Washington as break bulk cargo or container ship, with 21,600 shp (16,100 kW) at 15,950 tons, 21.0 knots (38.9 km/h; 24.2 mph). The largest general cargo liners in 1969.
  - Alaskan Mail 1968, renamed Cape Girardeau (AK-2039) 1978, scrapped September 2023.
  - Indian Mail renamed Cape Gibson (AK-5051), scrapped October 2020
  - Korean Mail built 1969, scrapped 1995.
  - Hong Kong Mail built 1968, renamed SS Wilson in 1978, scrapped June 2008.
  - American Mail (1969) later renamed SS Cleveland, scrapped 2009

== See also ==
- Victory ships
- Liberty ship
- Type C1 ship
- Type C2 ship
- Type C3 ship
- United States Merchant Marine Academy
- List of auxiliaries of the United States Navy
