= SS John M. Harlan =

World War II Liberty ship of the United States

History

United States
- Name: John M. Harlan
- Namesake: John M. Harlan
- Owner: War Shipping Administration (WSA)
- Operator: Moore-McCormack Lines, Inc.
- Ordered: as type (EC2-S-C1) hull, MC hull 1497
- Builder: J.A. Jones Construction, Brunswick, Georgia
- Cost: $1.892.040
- Yard number: 113
- Way number: 3
- Laid down: 5 May 1943
- Launched: 29 August 1943
- Sponsored by: Mrs. Henry V. Mason
- Completed: 16 September 1943
- Identification: Call Signal: KIRI
- Fate: Laid up in National Defense Reserve Fleet, Mobile, Alabama, 3 March 1948; Sold for scrapping, 25 February 1966

General characteristics
- Class & type: Liberty ship; type EC2-S-C1, standard
- Tonnage: 10,865 LT DWT; 7,176 GRT
- Displacement: 3,380 long tons (3,434 t) (light); 14,245 long tons (14,474 t) (max)
- Length: 441 feet 6 inches (135 m) oa; 416 feet (127 m) pp; 427 feet (130 m) lwl
- Beam: 57 feet (17 m)
- Draft: 27 ft 9.25 in (8.4646 m)
- Installed power: 2 × Oil fired 450 °F (232 °C) boilers, operating at 220 psi (1,500 kPa); 2,500 hp (1,900 kW)
- Propulsion: 1 × triple-expansion steam engine, (manufactured by Filer and Stowell, Milwaukee, Wisconsin); 1 × screw propeller
- Speed: 11.5 knots (21.3 km/h; 13.2 mph)
- Capacity: 562,608 cubic feet (15,931 m^{3}) (grain); 499,573 cubic feet (14,146 m^{3}) (bale)
- Complement: 38–62 USMM; 21–40 USNAG
- Armament: Varied by ship; Bow-mounted 3-inch (76 mm)/50-caliber gun; Stern-mounted 4-inch (102 mm)/50-caliber gun; 2–8 × single 20-millimeter (0.79 in) Oerlikon anti-aircraft (AA) cannons and/or, 2–8 × 37-millimeter (1.46 in) M1 AA guns

SS John M. Harlan was a Liberty ship built in the United States during World War II. She was named after John M. Harlan, an Associate Justice of the Supreme Court of the United States.

== Construction ==
John M. Harlan was laid down on 5 May 1943, under a United States Maritime Commission (MARCOM) contract, MC hull 1497, by J.A. Jones Construction, Brunswick, Georgia; sponsored by Mrs. Henry V. Mason, and launched on 29 August 1943.

== History ==
She was allocated to Moore-McCormack Lines, Inc., on 16 September 1943. On 3 March 1948, she was laid up in the National Defense Reserve Fleet in Mobile, Alabama. On 25 February 1966, she was sold, along with Elbridge Gerry and Henry St. George Tucker, to Southern Scrap Material for $151,079.79, for scrapping, she was delivered on 11 April 1966.

== Bibliography ==
- "Jones Construction, Brunswick GA". ShipbuildingHistory.com. 13 October 2010.
- "Liberty Ships – World War II".
- Maritime Administration. "John M. Harlan". Ship History Database Vessel Status Card. U.S. Department of Transportation, Maritime Administration. Archived from the original on 12 December 2019.
- Davies, James (May 2004). "Specifications (As-Built)" (PDF). p. 23.
- "SS John M. Harlan".
