= SS Cornhusker State =

Crane ship in ready reserve for the United States Navy

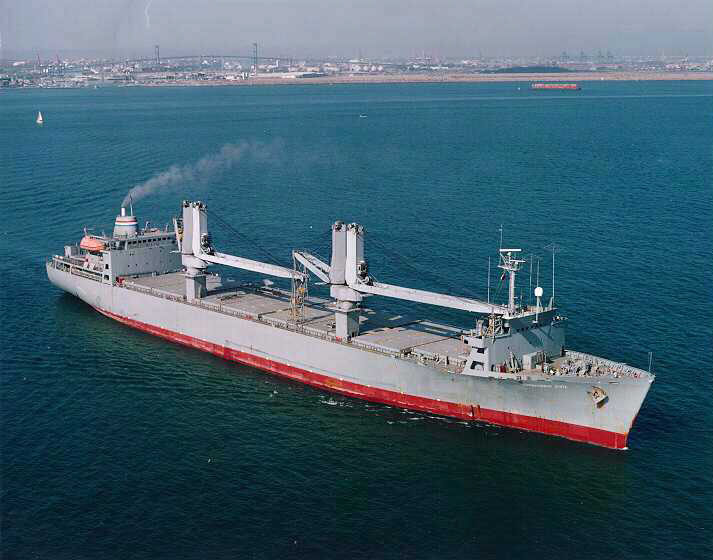
- SS Cornhusker State (T-ACS-6)

History

United States
- Name: SS Cornhusker State (T-ACS-7)
- Builder: Bath Iron Works, Bath, ME
- Laid down: 27 November 1967
- Launched: 2 November 1968
- Acquired: 20 June 1969
- In service: 7 May 1984
- Home port: Newport News, VA
- Identification: IMO number: 6916433; MMSI number: 366574000; Callsign: KAFQ
- Status: Ready Reserve Force
- Notes: Launched as the SS C.V. Stag Hound

General characteristics
- Class & type: Gopher State-class crane ship
- Displacement: 31,500 tons
- Length: 668 ft 5 in (203.73 m)
- Beam: 76 ft 1 in (23.19 m)
- Draft: 33 ft 6 in (10.21 m)
- Propulsion: two Combustion Engineering boilers two General Electric geared turbines single propeller, 10,747shp
- Speed: 17 kn (20 mph; 31 km/h)
- Capacity: 300+ Cargo Containers
- Complement: Full Operational Status: 89 civilian mariners Reduced Operational Status: 10 civilian mariners
- Armament: None
- Aviation facilities: None

SS Cornhusker State (T-ACS-6) is a crane ship in ready reserve for the United States Navy. She is stationed in Newport News, Virginia under operation control of the Military Sealift Command (MSC). The ship was named for the state of Nebraska, which is also known as the Cornhusker State.

== History ==
Cornhusker State was laid down on 27 November 1967, as the container ship CV Stag Hound, ON 520743, IMO 6916433, a Maritime Administration type (C5-S-73b) hull under MARAD contract (MA 207). Built by Bath Iron Works, Bath, Maine, hull no. 356, she was launched on 2 November 1968, and delivered to MARAD 20 June 1969, entering service for American Export-Isbrandtsen Lines. She was sold to Farrell Lines in 1978 without name change. The ship was returned to MARAD in 1986 and laid up in the National Defense Reserve Fleet (NDRF). In 1987–1988 she was converted to a type (C5-S-MA73c) Crane Ship by Norfolk Shipbuilding & Drydock, Norfolk, Virginia. Completed on 12 April 1988, she was placed in service as SS Cornhusker State (T-ACS-6) and assigned to the Ready Reserve Force (RRF), under operation control of the Military Sealift Command (MSC).
