= James A. Farrell Jr. =

American businessman (1901–1966)

- Born: James Augustine Farrell Jr. January 13, 1901; Brooklyn, New York, U.S.
- Died: September 15, 1978 (aged 77); Norwalk, Connecticut, U.S.
- Education: Yale University
- Occupation: Shipping Executive
- Known for: Founder of Farrell Lines
- Spouse: Emily Hill (m. 1934–1966)
- Father: James A. Farrell, Sr.
- Relatives: John J. Farrell (brother)

James Augustine Farrell Jr. (January 13, 1901 – September 15, 1978) was an American shipping executive and the founder of Farrell Lines, a major U.S.-based shipping line.

Established in 1925, Farrell Lines initially focused on trade routes between the United States and South Africa before expanding its operations globally. Farrell was the son of James A. Farrell, Sr., the president of the United States Steel Corporation, and continued his family’s legacy of involvement in international commerce. Under his leadership, Farrell Lines became one of the largest privately owned shipping companies in the United States, playing a significant role in maritime logistics during the mid-20th century.

== Biography ==
He was born in 1901 to James A. Farrell, Sr.. From his graduation from Yale University in 1924, he was a ship operator and owner. He and his brother and John J. Farrell eventually became the founders of a shipping company named Farrell Lines. He died in 1978
