= Gopher State-class crane ship =

Class of auxiliary vessels in the United States Navy

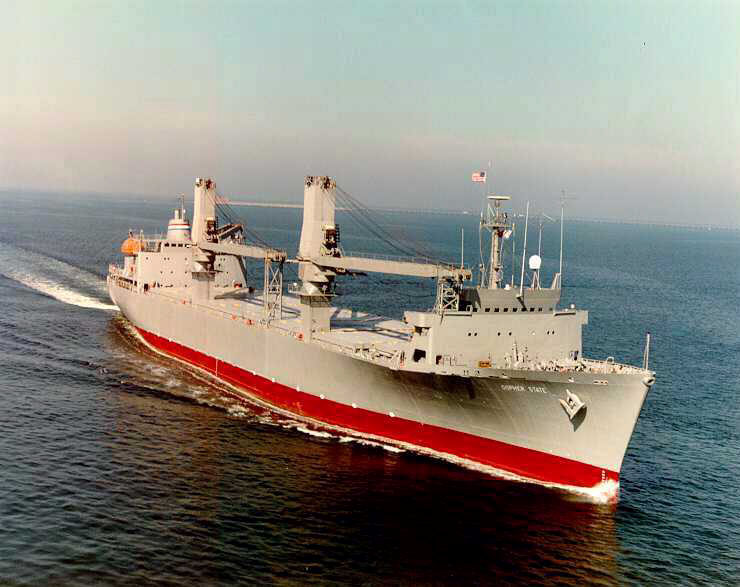
- SS Gopher State

Class overview
- Name: Gopher State class
- Builders: Bath Iron Works, Bath, Maine
- Operators: United States Navy
- Built: 1967–1972
- In commission: 1986–present
- Completed: 3
- Active: 3

General characteristics
- Type: Crane ship
- Displacement: 13,500 long tons (13,717 t) light
- Length: 668 ft 7 in (203.78 m)
- Beam: 76 ft 1 in (23.19 m)
- Draft: 33 ft 6 in (10.21 m)
- Propulsion: 2 boilers; 2 steam turbines; 1 shaft; 17,500 shp (13,050 kW)
- Speed: 17 knots (31 km/h; 20 mph)
- Capacity: 300+ containers; Four 30 ton cranes
- Complement: 9 civilians in Reduced Operating Status; 32 civilians in Full Operating Status

The Gopher State-class crane ships of the United States Navy are a class of auxiliary vessels. The lead ship of the class is named in honor of the state of Minnesota. Original United States Maritime Administration (MARAD) designation for the ship is C5-S-73b.

== History ==
All three vessels of the class were former Sea Witch-class container ships built at the Bath Iron Works for American Export-Isbrandtsen Lines. AEIL was acquired by Farrell Lines in 1978 and the ships were later returned to the Maritime Administration (MARAD) at an unknown date. They were converted for naval service as crane ships in 1986–1987.

SS Gopher State and SS Cornhusker State are in MARAD Ready Reserve Force status in Newport News, Virginia. SS Flickertail State has been transferred from the Ready Reserve Force to the National Defense Reserve Fleet (NDRF) at Alameda, CA., for stripping of spare parts for sister ships.

== Ships in class ==
- SS Gopher State (T-ACS-4) was converted from the Export Leader, Bath Hull No. 358, IMO 7226689
- SS Flickertail State (T-ACS-5) was converted from the CV Lightning, Bath Hull No. 355, IMO 6817845
- SS Cornhusker State (T-ACS-6) was converted from the CV Stag Hound, Bath Hull No. 356, IMO 6916433
