= Crosby v. National Foreign Trade Council =

- Supreme Court of the United States

Argued March 22, 2000 Decided June 19, 2000
- Full case name: Stephen P. Crosby, Secretary of Administration and Finance of Massachusetts, et al. v. National Foreign Trade Council
- Citations: 530 U.S. 363 (more) 120 S. Ct. 2288; 147 L. Ed. 2d 352; 2000 U.S. LEXIS 4153

Case history
- Prior: Natl. Foreign Trade Council v. Baker, 26 F. Supp. 2d 287 (D. Mass. 1998); affirmed sub. nom., Nat'l Foreign Trade Council v. Natsios, 181 F.3d 38 (1st Cir. 1999); cert. granted, 528 U.S. 1018 (1999).

Holding
- The state Act is preempted and its application unconstitutional, under the Supremacy Clause.

Court membership
- Chief Justice William Rehnquist Associate Justices John P. Stevens · Sandra Day O'Connor; Antonin Scalia · Anthony Kennedy; David Souter · Clarence Thomas; Ruth Bader Ginsburg · Stephen Breyer

Case opinions
- Majority: Souter, joined by Rehnquist, Stevens, O'Connor, Kennedy, Ginsburg, Breyer
- Concurrence: Scalia, joined by Thomas

Laws applied
- U.S. Const. art. VI

Crosby v. National Foreign Trade Council, 530 U.S. 363 (2000), was a unanimous case in which the Supreme Court of the United States used the federal preemption doctrine to strike down the Massachusetts Burma Law, a law that effectively prohibited Massachusetts' governmental agencies from buying goods and services from companies conducting business with Myanmar (Burma), essentially a secondary boycott. The Massachusetts Burma Law was modeled after similar legislation that had targeted the apartheid regime of South Africa.

The Court reasoned that since the United States Congress passed a law imposing sanctions on Myanmar, the Massachusetts law "undermines the intended purpose and 'natural effect' of at least three provisions of the federal Act, that is, its delegation of effective discretion to the President to control economic sanctions against Burma, its limitation of sanctions solely to United States persons and new investment, and its directive to the President to proceed diplomatically in developing a comprehensive, multilateral strategy towards Burma."

== See also ==
- Doe v. Unocal
- List of United States Supreme Court cases, volume 530
