= SS Cape Gibson =

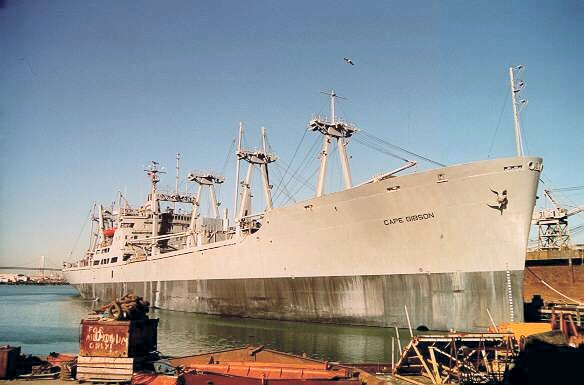
- Former Merchant Marine Academy flagship SS Cape Gibson, ex-SS Indian Mail.

History

United States
- Name: SS Indian Mail, later changed to SS President Jackson
- Owner: American Mail Lines, then sold to American President Lines
- Builder: Newport News Shipbuilding and Dry Dock Co., Newport News, Virginia
- Yard number: 588
- Way number: 517717
- Acquired: 13 December 1968
- Home port: Seattle, Washington
- Identification: IMO number: 6821614; MMSI number: 367076000; Callsign: KADB
- Fate: Transferred to MARAD, placed in the Pacific Reserve Fleet, Alameda at Alameda, California.

United States
- Name: T.S. Texas Clipper IV
- Owner: United States Maritime Administration
- Operator: Texas A&M University at Galveston
- In service: 19 October 2009
- Out of service: 2012
- Home port: Galveston, Texas
- Fate: Broken up 3 October 2020

General characteristics
- Class & type: Breakbulk cargo ship, Training Ship
- Displacement: 9,779 tons light, 31,995 tons fully loaded
- Length: 605 ft (184 m)
- Beam: 82 ft (25 m)
- Draft: 35 ft (11 m)
- Installed power: 24,000 shp at 105 rpm
- Propulsion: Single steam turbine, two boilers, single propeller
- Speed: 11 kt cruise
- Capacity: 22,216 DWT
- Crew: 32

SS Cape Gibson (AK-5051) was a Cape G Class Break bulk cargo ship of the United States Maritime Administration, last used as a training ship at Texas A&M University at Galveston before being scrapped in 2020.

== History ==
The ship was originally delivered as SS Indian Mail a class C5-S-75a ship, to American Mail Line, of Seattle in 1968 as one of five C5-S-75a class breakbulk cargo container ships (the others being SS Alaskan Mail, SS American Mail, SS Korea Mail, and SS Hong Kong Mail). With the onset of containerization, this type of cargo ship was approaching obsolescence, but this class was well equipped for handling a wide variety of cargoes. The ship was later acquired by American President Lines and name was changed to SS President Jackson. In 1988 the ship was transferred to MARAD, renamed SS Cape Gibson and mothballed in the National Defense Reserve Fleet at Alameda, California. She was assigned to the Military Sealift Command as a Modular Cargo Delivery System Ship and capable of being reactivated in five days. In November 2002 the Cape Gibson was activated in preparation for Operation Iraqi Freedom with a West Coast US Merchant Marine crew. It sailed From Indian Island, Washington, to Diego Garcia, arriving in February 2003. After a two-week stay, a US Navy Cargo Afloat Rig Team (CART) was boarded there. It then steamed into the Persian Gulf as part of the USS Constellation Carrier group Where it provided ammunition to the Fleet (VERTREP) for the duration of hostilities. After over 60 days at sea the ship returned to Diego Garcia for a short stay, discharging the CART team. It then Returned home to Indian Island via Saipan in the Marianas Islands and the US Naval Base at Sasebo, Japan. The Cape Gibson remained activated for several Trans-Pacific voyages. In 2009 SS Cape Gibson was reactivated as training ship for Texas A&M Maritime Academy cadets, serving until 2012 until being replaced by TS General Rudder. She was subsequently placed in the Beaumont Reserve Fleet. In August 2016 she was designated for disposal and scrapped on 3 October 2020.
