= SS Bernard Carter =

Liberty ship of WWII

History

United States
- Name: Bernard Carter
- Namesake: Bernard Carter
- Owner: War Shipping Administration (WSA)
- Operator: American South African Line, Inc.
- Ordered: as type (EC2-S-C1) hull, MCE hull 55
- Awarded: 14 March 1941
- Builder: Bethlehem-Fairfield Shipyard, Baltimore, Maryland
- Cost: $1,086,055
- Yard number: 2042
- Way number: 6
- Laid down: 6 June 1942
- Launched: 29 July 1942
- Sponsored by: Mrs. C.E. Walsh Jr.
- Completed: 8 August 1942
- Identification: Call sign: KGFB
- Fate: Laid up in the James River Reserve Fleet, Lee Hall, Virginia, 1 June 1946; Sold for scrapping, 18 September 1958, withdrawn from fleet, 27 January 1960

General characteristics
- Class & type: Liberty ship; type EC2-S-C1, standard
- Tonnage: 10,865 LT DWT; 7,176 GRT
- Displacement: 3,380 long tons (3,434 t) (light); 14,245 long tons (14,474 t) (max)
- Length: 441 feet 6 inches (135 m) oa; 416 feet (127 m) pp; 427 feet (130 m) lwl
- Beam: 57 feet (17 m)
- Draft: 27 ft 9.25 in (8.4646 m)
- Installed power: 2 × Oil fired 450 °F (232 °C) boilers, operating at 220 psi (1,500 kPa); 2,500 hp (1,900 kW)
- Propulsion: 1 × triple-expansion steam engine, (manufactured by Worthington Pump & Machinery Corp, Harrison, New Jersey); 1 × screw propeller
- Speed: 11.5 knots (21.3 km/h; 13.2 mph)
- Capacity: 562,608 cubic feet (15,931 m^{3}) (grain); 499,573 cubic feet (14,146 m^{3}) (bale)
- Complement: 38–62 USMM; 21–40 USNAG
- Armament: Varied by ship; Bow-mounted 3-inch (76 mm)/50-caliber gun; Stern-mounted 4-inch (102 mm)/50-caliber gun; 2–8 × single 20-millimeter (0.79 in) Oerlikon anti-aircraft (AA) cannons and/or, 2–8 × 37-millimeter (1.46 in) M1 AA guns

SS Bernard Carter was a Liberty ship built in the United States during World War II. She was named after Bernard Carter, a lawyer, professor, and politician from Maryland. Carter was corporate attorney in Baltimore and a professor at the University of Maryland.

== Construction ==
Bernard Carter was laid down on 6 June 1942, under a Maritime Commission (MARCOM) contract, MCE hull 55, by the Bethlehem-Fairfield Shipyard, Baltimore, Maryland; she was sponsored by Mrs. C.E. Walsh Jr., the wife of the chief of the procurement division of MARCOM in Washington DC, and was launched on 29 July 1942.

== History ==
She was allocated to American South African Line, on 8 August 1942. On 1 June 1946, she was laid up in the James River Reserve Fleet, Lee Hall, Virginia, with approximately $100,000 in damage to her bottom. She was sold for scrapping on 18 September 1958, to Bethlehem Steel Co., for $76,191. She was withdrawn from the fleet on 27 January 1960.

== Bibliography ==
- "Bethlehem-Fairfield, Baltimore MD". www.ShipbuildingHistory.com. 14 August 2008.
- Maritime Administration. "Bernard Carter". Ship History Database Vessel Status Card. U.S. Department of Transportation, Maritime Administration.
- Davies, James (May 2004). "Specifications (As-Built)" (PDF). p. 23.
- "SS Bernard Carter".
