= SS Flickertail State =

Crane ship in ready reserve for the United States Navy

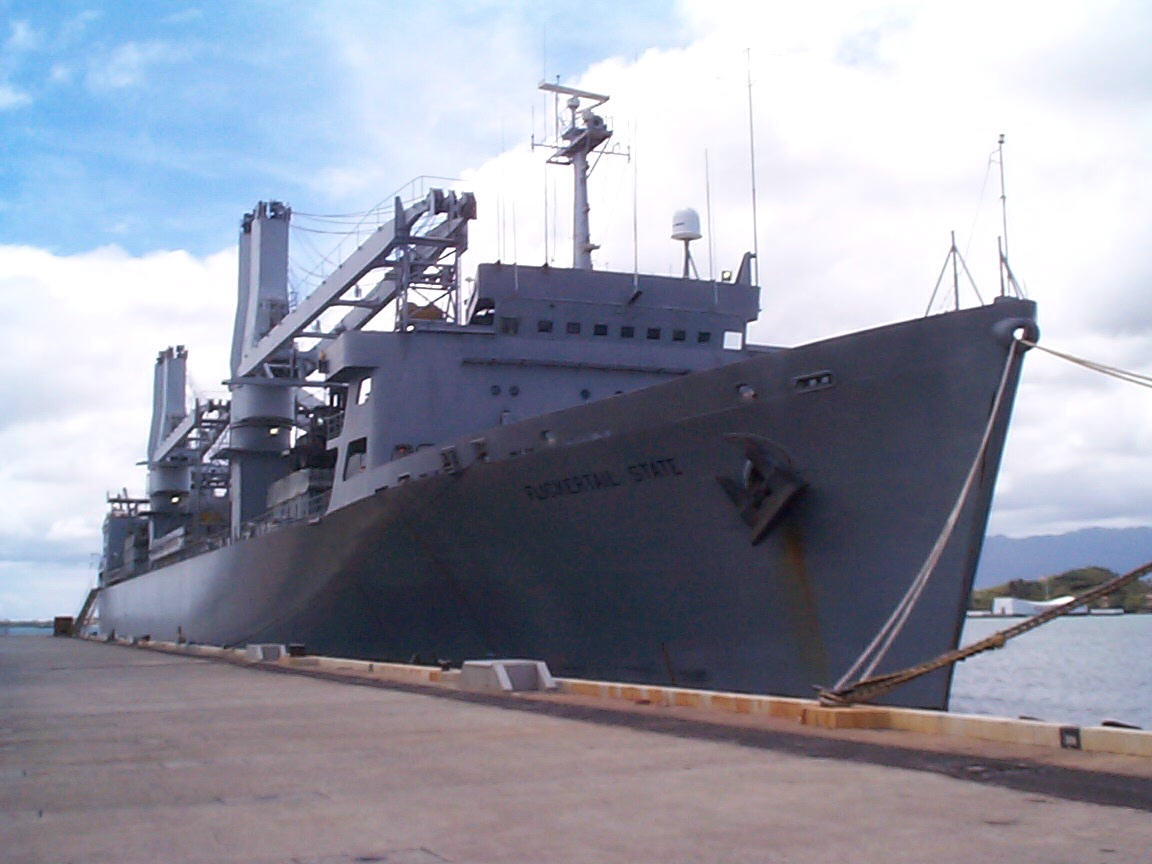
- SS Flickertail State (T-ACS-5)

History

United States
- Name: CV Export Lightning (MA-206)
- Owner: United States Maritime Administration
- Operator: American Export Isbrandtsen Line
- Ordered: 30 November 1965
- Builder: Bath Iron Works
- Laid down: 14 February 1967
- Launched: 11 May 1968
- In service: 21 February 1969 to 1986
- Identification: IMO number: 6817845; MMSI number: 366532000; Callsign: KAFP
- Fate: Acquired by the United States Navy in 1986

United States
- Name: SS Flickertail State (T-ACS-5)
- Namesake: The state of North Dakota, which is also known as the Flickertail State.
- In service: 9 February 1988 to the present
- Home port: Newport News, VA
- Identification: IMO number: 6817845; MMSI number: 366532000; Callsign: KAFP
- Notes: Five days required to activate for service.

General characteristics
- Class & type: Gopher State-class crane ship
- Displacement: 31,500 long tons
- Length: 668 ft 7 in
- Beam: 76 ft 1 in
- Draft: 33 ft 6 in
- Propulsion: Single propeller
- Speed: 17 knots
- Complement: 9 civilian during Reduced Operating Status; 32 civilian during Full Operating Status

SS Flickertail State (T-ACS-5) is a crane ship in ready reserve for the United States Navy. She is stationed at Newport News, Virginia and is in ready reserve under the Military Sealift Command (MSC). The ship was named for the state of North Dakota, which is also known as the Flickertail State.

== History ==
Flickertail State was laid down on 14 February 1967, as the container ship CV Lightning, ON 518063, IMO 6817845, a Maritime Administration type (C5-S-73b) hull under MARAD contract (MA 206). Built by Bath Iron Works, Bath, Maine, hull no. 355, she was launched on 11 May 1968, and delivered to MARAD 21 February 1969, entering service for American Export-Isbrandtsen Lines. She was sold to Farrell Lines in 1978 without name change. The ship was returned to MARAD in 1986 and laid up in the National Defense Reserve Fleet (NDRF). In 1987-1988 she was converted to a type (C5-S-MA73c) Crane Ship by Norfolk Shipbuilding & Drydock, Norfolk, Virginia. Completed on 8 February 1988, she was placed in service as SS Flickertail State (T-ACS-5) and assigned to the Ready Reserve Force (RRF), under operation control of the Military Sealift Command (MSC).

Flickertail State was assigned to Maritime Prepositioning Ship Squadron Three and was maintained in a four-day readiness status. Flickertail State has been in ready reserve at Newport News, Virginia since 1993.

== Large vessel lift on/lift off ==
In 2009, a demonstrator crane was installed and integrated aboard the SS Flickertail State to evaluate the crane's performance in transporting containers between two moving ships in an operational environment using commercial and oil industry at-sea mooring techniques, at sea in the Gulf of Mexico. Developed by the Sea Warfare and Weapons Department in the Office of Naval Research along with Oceaneering International, the LVI Lo/Lo crane has sensors and cameras as well as motion-sensing algorithms that let it automatically shift with the rolling and pitching of the sea, making it much easier for operators to center the crane over cargo and transfer it.

== See also ==
- Operation Steel Box
