= James A. Farrell Sr. =

American businessman (1863–1943)

James Augustine Farrell Sr.
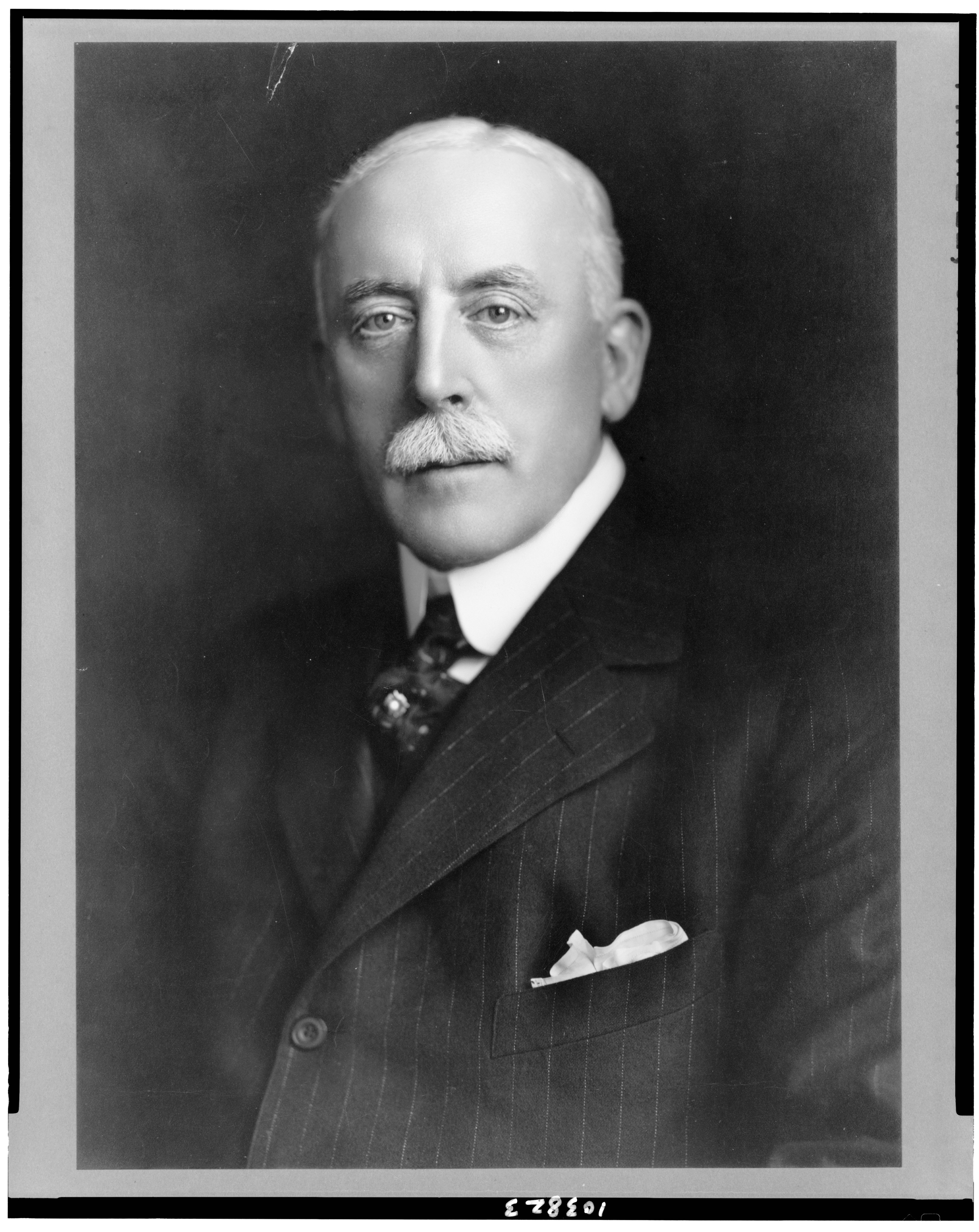
- Farrell circa 1915

3rd President of U.S. Steel
- In office 1911 – April 18, 1932
- Preceded by: Elbert Henry Gary
- Succeeded by: William A. Irvin

Personal details
- Born: February 15, 1863 New Haven, Connecticut
- Died: March 28, 1943 (aged 80) Manhattan, New York City
- Children: John J. Farrell; Mrs. Joseph P. Murray; Mrs. Luke D. Stapelton; James A. Farrell, Jr. Mrs. Richard J. Buck
- Parent(s): John Guy Farrell; Catherine Whalen

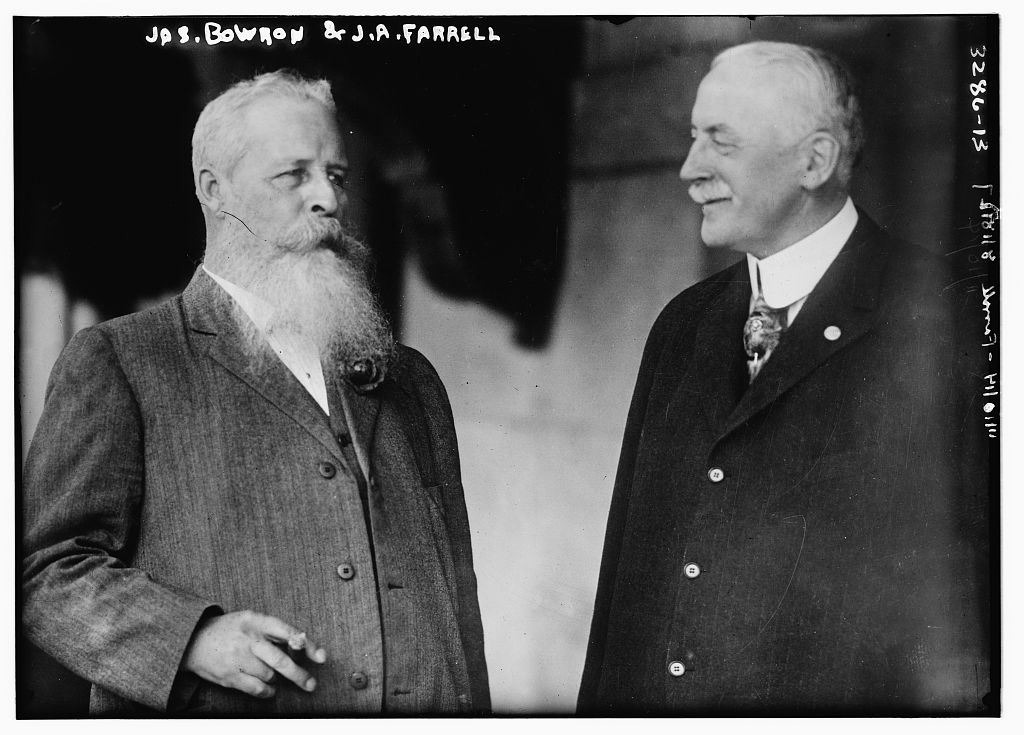
James Augustine Farrell (right) with James Bowron in 1914

James Augustine Farrell Sr. (February 15, 1863 – March 28, 1943) was president of US Steel from 1911 to 1932. A major business figure of his era, Farrell expanded US Steel by a factor of five during his presidency, turning it into America's first billion-dollar company. Farrell was also a champion and early pioneer of export markets, who massively expanded US steel exports to the world with the help of the shipping subsidiary he founded, the Isthmian Steamship Company.

== Early life and family ==
James A. Farrell was born in New Haven, Connecticut, on February 15, 1863, to John Guy Farrell and Catherine Whalen. John Guy Farrell was a ship owner and captain who was lost at sea when James was less than 16 years old, forcing the boy to find a job to help support the family.

== Career ==
A self-made man, Farrell rose as a salesman with US Steel and Wire (US Steel's export division) to become the firm's manager by 1899. Under his leadership US Steel and Wire massively expanded its exports to foreign markets from 200,000 tons per year to 1.5 million tons by 1903.

Perhaps because he was the son of a ship captain, Farrell never lost his interest in maritime affairs and in 1910 established the Isthmian Steamship Company, a subsidiary of US Steel. Farrell believed that if US Steel exported using its own ships instead of leasing cargo space from other shipping companies, it could achieve substantial savings. His assessment proved correct and Isthmian became a highly lucrative subsidiary of the parent firm.

Cognizant of his obvious talents, the board of US Steel appointed Farrell President of the company in 1911, a position he held for 22 years until his retirement at the age of 70 in 1932. During his time at the helm, US Steel became America's first billion dollar company and the US steel industry's number one player by the mid-1920s. Since Farrell's retirement, US Steel has not significantly increased its share of the US steel industry.

Farrell was a pioneer of export markets and believed passionately in the importance of foreign trade. He was particularly keen on increasing trade with Asia. In a 1932 speech, Farrell said:

West of you lies the Orient with the teeming millions of hard-working thrifty people, the great majority of whom, unfortunately are still existing on a standard of life materially below that of some of their neighbors. It is apt to be forgotten...when viewing the current cessation of trade, that the Pacific area is perhaps the most rapidly developing market in the world. Even during the decline of the past two years the interchange of goods between the countries bordering on the Pacific has continued to increase in volume, even though declining in value. All other trade areas have declined in both volume and value. It is significant to note that this growth of trade was not accompanied by a corresponding increase in population. It was, however, accompanied by a striking development in communication and transportation, the constant companions of commercial progress.

== Other activities ==
Farrell was the inaugural chairman of the National Foreign Trade Council, an institution he helped to set up and which he would continue to chair for many years. He also tried to promote interest in foreign trade by supporting institutions such as the School of Foreign Service. Farrell opposed trade unionism and refused to negotiate with unions in the 1919 steel industry strike.

== Personal life and death ==
In 1889, Farrell married Catherine McDermott of Brooklyn, New York City, New York. Among their children: John J. Farrell, the chairman of the board of the American South African Line; Mrs. Joseph P. Murray; Mrs. Luke D. Stapelton; James A. Farrell, Jr. the president of the American South African Line; and Mrs. Richard J. Buck.

Farrell died on March 28, 1943, in Manhattan, New York City. 1,500 people attended the funeral mass at the Church of St. Ignatius Loyola on March 30, 1943, in Manhattan.

== Legacy ==
Farrell, Pennsylvania, is named after him.
