= Farrell Lines =

American shipping company

- Farrell Lines logo
- Type: Subsidiary
- Industry: Maritime transport
- Predecessor: American South African Line, Inc.
- Founded: December 31, 1925; 100 years ago
- Founder: James A. Farrell Jr. John J. Farrell
- Headquarters: Dulles, Virginia, United States
- Area served: Gulf of Mexico, U.S. East Coast, Mediterranean Sea, Red Sea, Arabian Sea, Gulf of Oman, and Persian Gulf.
- Services: Roll-on/roll-off cargo transportation
- Parent: Maersk
- Website: farrelllines.com

Farrell Lines, Incorporated is a U.S.-based shipping company specializing in roll-on/roll-off (RO/RO) cargo transportation. Founded in 1925 as the American South African Line by James A. Farrell Jr. and John J. Farrell, the company initially served trade routes between the United States and South Africa. It was renamed Farrell Lines in 1948 to reflect its expanded operations across Africa and to honor their father, James A. Farrell, Sr., a prominent industrialist and former president of the United States Steel Corporation.

Over its history, Farrell Lines adapted to significant industry changes, including the transition to containerized cargo and adjustments to financial and operational challenges. After being acquired by P&O Nedlloyd in 2000, the company became part of Maersk in 2005. Under Maersk, the Farrell Lines brand was revitalized in 2010, focusing on RO/RO services primarily in support of U.S. military operations.

Today, Farrell Lines operates a fleet of U.S.-flagged vessels in partnership with Höegh Autoliners and Alliance Navigation. It participates in government programs such as the Maritime Security Program (MSP) and the Voluntary Intermodal Sealift Agreement (VISA), contributing to national defense logistics and maintaining its role in international ocean transportation.

== History ==
=== American South African Line (1922–1948) ===
==== Establishment and early operations (1922–1926) ====
In 1922, the United States Shipping Board (USSB) established a shipping route between U.S. Atlantic ports and those in Southern Africa and Portuguese East Africa to bolster American export and import capabilities and strengthen the nation's presence in international trade.

This initiative emerged from the post-World War I shipbuilding program led by the USSB’s Emergency Fleet Corporation (EFC). The EFC, formed during the war to expand the U.S. merchant fleet, continued its shipbuilding efforts even after the November 11th armistice of 1918. The program ultimately produced 2,312 vessels by 1922, making the U.S. merchant fleet one of the largest and most modern in the world. To capitalize on this expanded fleet, Congress passed the Merchant Marine Act of 1920 (commonly referred to as the Jones Act), which restricted coastwise and intercoastal trade to U.S.-flagged vessels and encouraged the sale of surplus ships to private companies. These actions aligned with the USSB’s goal of privatizing shipping operations and strengthening America’s role in global commerce and national defense. It began with monthly service between New York and Cape Town, fulfilling the USSB's mission to ensure uninterrupted trade. Operations began with five government-owned vessels managed by the EFC. Initially, the vessels were surplus from World War I and tailored for both cargo and limited passenger services. Managing operations was first assigned to C.D. Mallory, Inc. under an agency agreement.

In October 1924, the service received the trade name "American South African Line" under a USSB resolution dated October 13, 1924, and ratified on October 22, 1924, with managing operations transferred to A. H. Bull & Co.

In November 1925, the USSB announced the sale of the American South African Line and its five vessels through a public auction. On December 10, 1925, John M. Franklin, representing the Farrell family and other investors, placed the winning bid of US$784,019.50 (equivalent to about $14,393,527 in 2025), securing the company and its vessels under the stipulated terms. On December 22, 1925, the USSB authorized the sale to a company yet to be formed under the name of the American South African Line, guaranteeing service between U.S. Atlantic and Gulf ports and South African ports.

The American South African Line, Inc. was then incorporated on December 31, 1925, in Albany, New York. The incorporating officers included Luke D. Stapleton, Jr., William F. Curran, James S. Regan, and Arthur W. Morrison from the law firm Baldwin, Barns & Stapleton. The founding stockholders included key figures in shipping, shipbuilding, and trade: John J. Farrell, president of the Argonaut Steamship Line, Inc.; his younger brother James A. Farrell Jr., a recent Yale graduate; Arthur R. Lewis Sr., president of the American and Cuban Steamship Line, Inc. and the Seas Shipping Company; John M. Franklin, general manager for Argonaut Lines; Leigh C. Palmer, former president of the Emergency Fleet Corporation; Lynn H. Korndorff, president of the Federal Shipbuilding and Drydock Company; and Eugene P. Thomas, president of the National Foreign Trade Council. Together, these individuals leveraged their expertise to establish a company managing vital trade routes between the United States and Southern and East Africa. James A. Farrell, Jr., the largest stockholder, became its first president.

==== Expansion and World War II contributions (1926–1948) ====
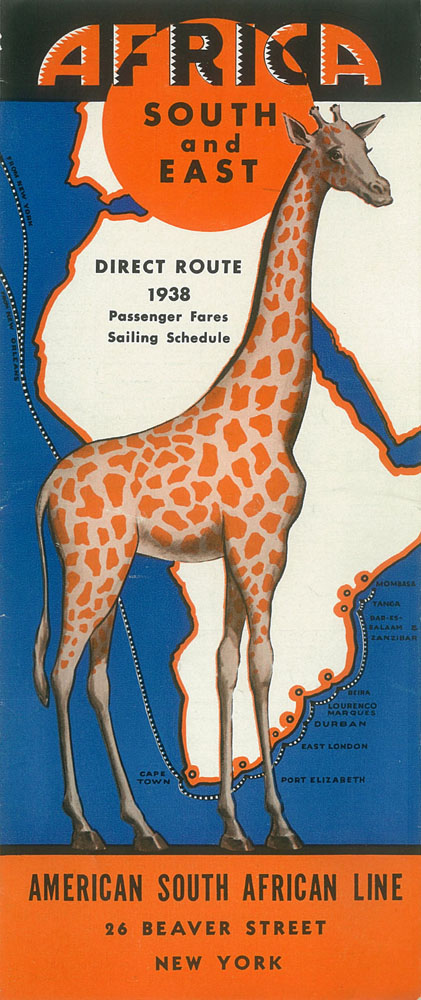
1938 sailing schedule and passenger fare brochure of the American South African Line

The route faced intense competition from established British lines backed by wealthy parent companies operating on multiple routes. In contrast, the American South African Line was limited to this single service, which operated at a substantial annual deficit. With the line now under private ownership, the government recognized the need to provide subsidies to guarantee its viability and ensure continued U.S. representation on the route.

By resolution dated May 21, 1926, the USSB recommended to the United States Postmaster General that a mail transportation contract be awarded to the American South African Line under section 24 of the Merchant Marine Act of 1920. The contract was aimed at sustaining the liner service maintained by the company between New York and ports in the Cape Town-Beira range of British and Portuguese South and East Africa. Compensation was set at US$5,000 (equivalent to about $90,930 in 2025) for each outgoing voyage, with 12 voyages per year scheduled at approximately four-week intervals. This subsidy not only ensured the viability of the American South African Line, but also aligned with U.S. efforts to maintain a competitive merchant marine and assert economic influence on international trade routes. Following the USSB's recommendation, the Postmaster General entered into the contract with the American South African Line on June 7, 1926.

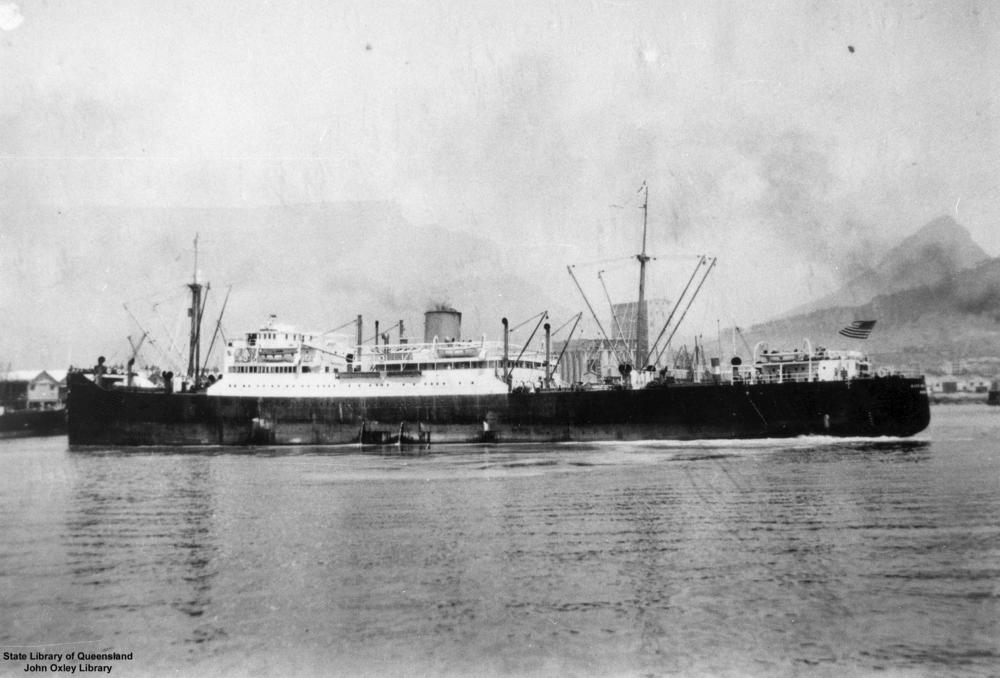
8,272 GRT passenger motorship City of New York, built in 1930 by Sun Ship Building and Dry Dock Co for American South African Line (Farrell Lines). In 1942 she was sunk by torpedo by the German submarine U-160.

Realizing the potential for direct passenger service, the American South African Line built its first passenger ship, the SS City of New York, in 1929. Designed to accommodate approximately 60 passengers, the ship gained popularity in both the U.S. and South Africa. Its sinking by enemy action in 1942 marked a significant loss for transatlantic travel.

In 1935, the company expanded operations by inaugurating the first U.S.-flag service from Gulf ports to South and East Africa. A monthly schedule was maintained until 1938, at which point vessels were redirected to the Atlantic service to meet growing demand. However, the same year, the Robin Line—founded by Arthur R. Lewis Sr. as a subsidiary of the Seas Shipping Company—shifted its focus from intercoastal trade to directly competing with the Farrell-controlled service to African ports. Initially intended to complement the American South African Line, disputes between the Farrell and Lewis families led to distinct operations for the two lines. Robin Line’s entry into the African trade triggered a rate war lasting until 1937, when the United States Maritime Commission (USMC) subsidies temporarily eased tensions.

In 1940, the Farrell brothers—John J. Farrell, president of the Argonaut Line, and James A. Farrell Jr., president of the American South African Line—merged their respective companies. Declining intercoastal trade and booming Atlantic freight rates drove the decision, with John J. Farrell becoming chairman of the newly consolidated company while James A. Farrell Jr. remained as president. The merger marked a strategic consolidation of the Farrell family’s shipping ventures.

During World War II, the American South African Line, then commonly referred to as Amsaline, and the Robin Line served as berth agents for the War Shipping Administration in the U.S.-South and East Africa trade. The lines' vessels were requisitioned by the USMC for military use, supporting Allied logistics by transporting troops, equipment, and supplies. Many ships were retrofitted as troop transports or cargo carriers, underscoring the strategic importance of U.S.-flagged vessels.

To meet wartime demands, the American South African Line launched an expansion program in 1940–1941, commissioning three passenger ships capable of accommodating 120 passengers each. However, these ships were requisitioned for wartime operations upon completion in 1941, highlighting the merchant marine's critical role in national defense. The constant threat of German U-boats in the Atlantic posed significant challenges, resulting in damage to or loss of several vessels. Despite these difficulties, the company's contributions to Allied logistics earned widespread recognition.

In 1947, the USMC authorized the American South African Line to purchase all outstanding shares of the Bloomfield Steamship Co., headquartered in Houston, Texas. Prior to this acquisition, the American South African Line held a 20% stake in Bloomfield, representing a cash investment of US$240,000 (equivalent to about $3,460,507 in 2025). The company acquired the remaining shares for US$1,365,000 (equivalent to about $19,681,632 in 2025). The transaction also involved the transfer of three Bloomfield vessels—the Archer, Argonaut, and Mandarin—to the American South African Line. These vessels, later renamed the SS African Patriot, SS African Pilgrim, and SS African Pilot, were 6,214-gross-ton ships with three decks, built in 1944. This acquisition allowed the American South African Line to expand its fleet and integrate the Gulf-to-South Africa route into its broader operations.

Following the war, the company resumed civilian operations under the Farrell name, reflecting its streamlined focus as the sole shipping venture of the Farrell family. This transition culminated in the renaming of the company to Farrell Line in April 1948, signifying its new status as a leading U.S.-flagged shipping line.

=== Farrell Lines, Incorporated (1948–present) ===
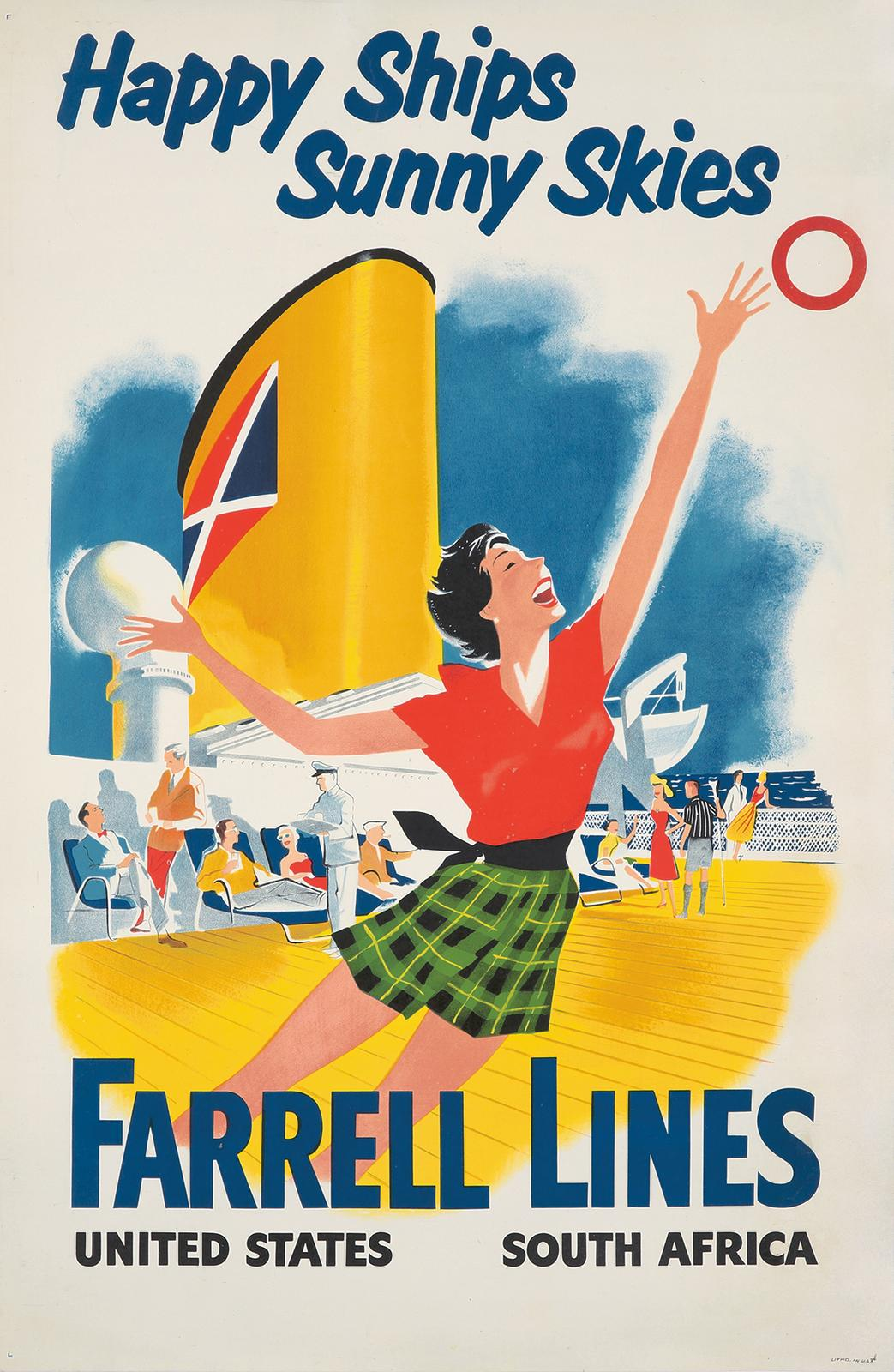
Vintage travel poster promoting Farrell Lines' ocean passenger service between the U.S. and South Africa

On April 1, 1948, the American South African Line, Inc. officially changed its name to Farrell Lines, Incorporated. The decision reflected the company's expanded scope of operations, which now included regular services to ports on the east, west, and south coasts of Africa. The original name, focused solely on South Africa, was deemed no longer descriptive of the comprehensive services provided by the company.

The new name was chosen to honor James A. Farrell, Sr., a prominent figure in American industry and shipping. Farrell, who was the father of both James A. Farrell, Jr. and John J. Farrell, had served as chairman of the United States Steel Corporation and founded the National Foreign Trade Council, Inc. His foresight and commitment to developing regular freight services to Africa were instrumental in the establishment of the company and in mentoring his sons.

In 1965, Farrell Lines expanded its operations by acquiring the Australia-U.S. East Coast service from United States Lines. Around the same time, it ceased passenger services to focus exclusively on cargo transportation. The company continued to grow, transitioning to containerized cargo handling in the 1970s and acquiring additional shipping lines, including the West-Coast Australia Service of the Pacific Far East Line in 1975. By 1978, Farrell Lines had become the second-largest U.S.-flag merchant fleet, operating 44 ships, including two container ships under construction at Bath Iron Works.

However, financial difficulties in the 1980s forced the company to reduce its fleet significantly. Farrell Lines dropped its African and European routes, selling 38 of its 44 ships. By 1991, it operated with only four vessels, focusing on routes in the Mediterranean and Persian Gulf.

==== Farrell Lines International ====
Farrell Lines International Corp., a Liberian subsidiary of Farrell Lines Inc., operated from the 1950s until the outbreak of the First Liberian Civil War in 1988. Its feeder fleet of four coastal vessels—M/V Kpo, M/V Farmington, M/V Cestos, and M/V Cavalla—provided essential supplies to Firestone Natural Rubber plantations and transported cargo to remote areas via Liberian National Airways. These ships were specifically designed for the challenging conditions of West African coastal waters and rivers, contributing to the region's supply chain.

==== Sale and revitalization ====
In 2000, Farrell Lines was acquired by P&O Nedlloyd, which was subsequently purchased by Maersk in 2005. Under Maersk#Maersk Line, Limited—the U.S. flag operating arm of Maersk—Farrell Lines reemerged as a roll-on/roll-off (RO/RO) carrier. The Farrell Lines brand was revitalized in 2010, and the fleet was increased to four vessels.

==== Current operations ====
The Farrell Lines fleet includes three modern pure car and truck carriers—the Alliance Fairfax, the Alliance St. Louis, and the Alliance Norfolk. These vessels are designed for roll-on/roll-off (RO/RO) and breakbulk (B/B) cargo, with adjustable deck configurations to accommodate both commercial and military shipping needs. Built by Daewoo Shipbuilding & Marine Engineering Co., Ltd. in Geoje, South Korea, all vessels are registered under the U.S. flag to Alliance Navigation LLC, a wholly owned subsidiary of Höegh Autoliners ASA and classified by Lloyd's Register.

The vessels are owned under trust agreements benefiting Höegh Autoliners and are under charter to Maersk Line, Limited, which operates as the vessel-operating common carrier (VOCC). Farrell Lines, as a subsidiary of Maersk Line, Limited, plays a key role in supporting military logistics by handling cargo bookings for military shipments. Farrell Lines primarily operates on routes connecting the Gulf of Mexico and the U.S. East Coast with the Middle East and Southwest Asia.

Farrell Lines is an active participant in the United States Maritime Administration (MARAD) Maritime Security Program (MSP) and the Voluntary Intermodal Sealift Agreement (VISA), exclusive programs designed to ensure the availability of U.S.-flagged vessels and intermodal resources during times of national emergency or military contingency. Participation in these programs requires stringent qualification criteria and reflects Farrell Lines' strategic importance to U.S. national security and defense logistics.

The Alliance St. Louis, built in 2005, has a gross tonnage of 57,280 tons and a summer deadweight tonnage (DWT) of 21,081 tons. The vessel measures 199.9 meters in length, with a beam of 32.25 meters and a draught of 9 meters. It was previously named Hual Paris until September 2006 and Höegh Paris until February 2008, during which time it sailed under the Norwegian flag. The vessel operates under the callsign WGAE.

The Alliance Norfolk, built in 2007, has a gross tonnage of 57,280 tons and a summer DWT of 21,500 tons. It is 199.9 meters in length, with a beam of 32.25 meters and a draught of 8.2 meters. The vessel was formerly named Höegh Madrid until November 2007, during which time it sailed under the Norwegian flag. The vessel operates under the callsign WGAH.

The Alliance Fairfax, built in 2005, has a gross tonnage of 59,705 tons and a summer DWT of 19,670 tons. Like the other vessels, it measures 199.9 meters in length, with a beam of 32.25 meters and a draught of 9 meters. It was initially named Maersk Willow until June 2008, during which time it sailed under the Singaporean flag, and then Höegh Kyoto until February 2013, when it sailed under the Norwegian flag. The vessel operates under the callsign WLMQ.

== Identity and branding ==
Farrell Lines' house flag

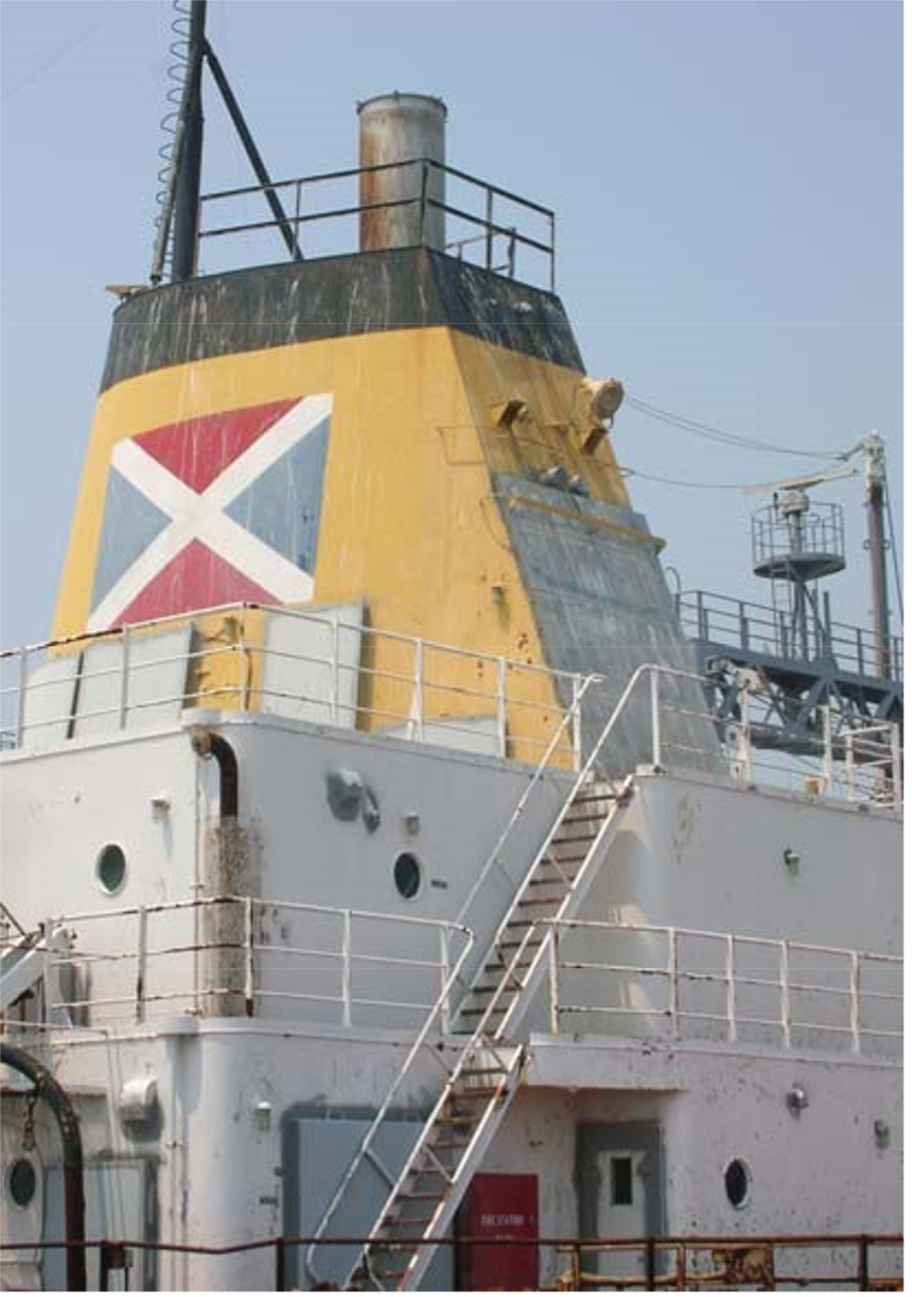
Farrell Lines' funnel design on the SS Resolute

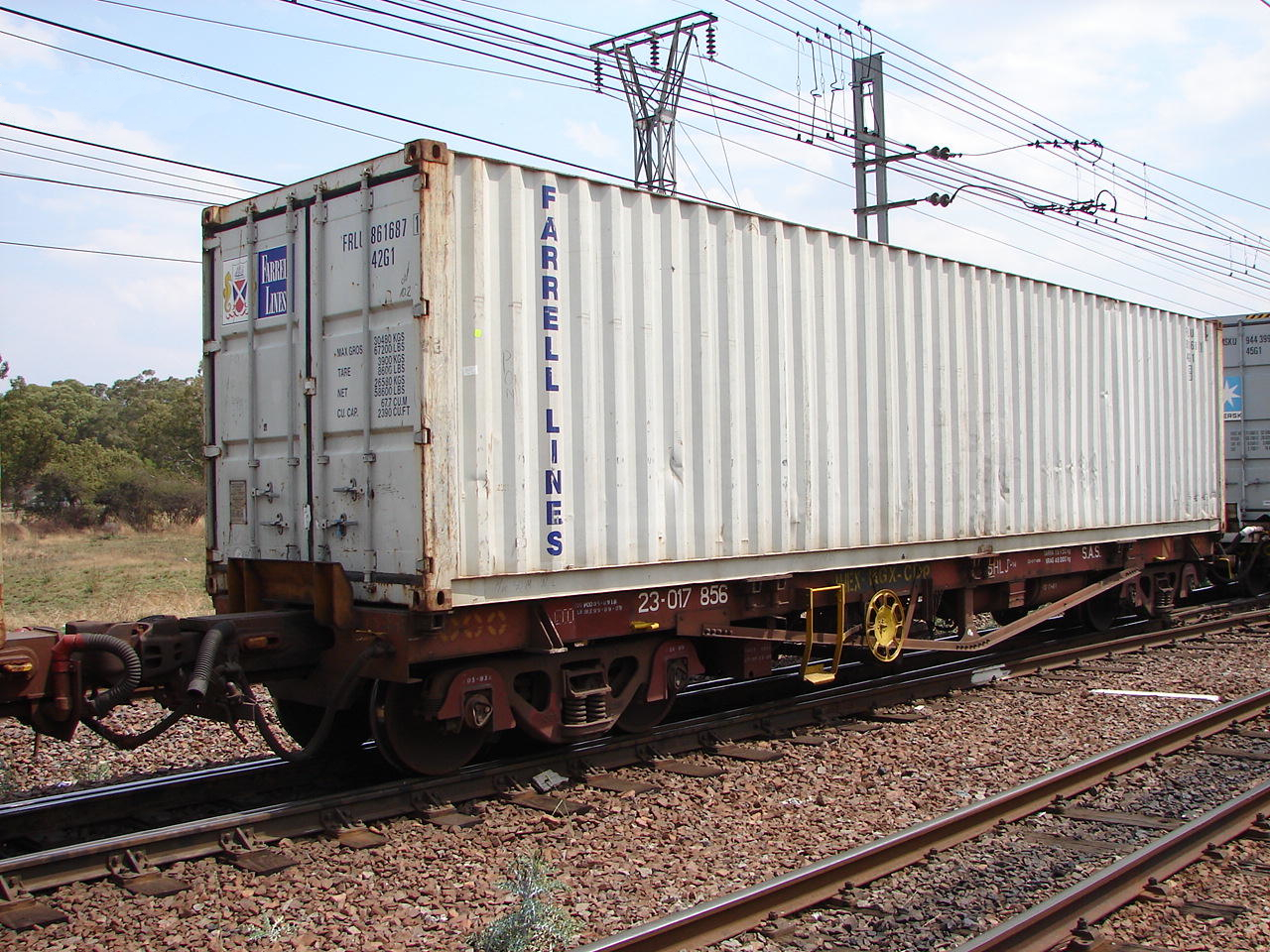
A 40-foot-long (12.2 m) Farrell Lines shipping container

=== House flag ===
The house flag of Farrell Lines, first adopted as the house flag of the American South African Line, features a white St. Andrew's Cross dividing the field into four sections. The top and bottom triangles are red, while the left and right triangles are blue. This design symbolized the company's maritime identity and continued to represent Farrell Lines following its renaming in 1948.

On November 24, 1954, the Treasury Department's Office of the Commissioner of Customs officially registered the house flag and funnel mark of Farrell Lines, Inc., in accordance with section 3.81(a) of the Customs Regulations (19 CFR 3.81(a)). The registered description of the house flag noted its rectangular shape, with the fly measuring 1.5 times the height of the hoist, and its distinctive white St. Andrew's Cross dividing the alternating blue and red field.

=== Ships' funnel ===
The funnel mark was also registered, featuring the house flag design on a round buff funnel. The funnel included a black band at its top, extending down a width equal to that of the funnel, with the house flag centered three feet below the black band.

- 1925 - 1946: buff
- 1946 - 2000: buff with black top, house flag on each side

=== Logo ===
When the company was renamed, it adopted a coat of arms as its official logo. The design, rich in maritime symbolism, is blazoned as follows: on a square escutcheon, per saltire argent, azure, and gules; a double engrailed chief argent bearing the square-rigger Tusitala argent, outlined in azure, to sinister; supported by two seahorses or, respectant, upon a compartment of stylized waves, gules.

Over time, the company modernized its visual identity. The current logo features a stylized shield flanked by two seahorses in blue. The shield retains the original colors of the house flag. Below the shield, the company’s name is displayed in bold, uppercase letters.

=== Containers ===
Farrell Lines' reporting mark is FRLU. These containers were typically painted white, with the company's coat-of-arms logo displayed in full color on the upper left door. The company name was featured in bold blue lettering, displayed vertically along the sides and near the door. These containers were used for intermodal transport across ships, rail, and trucks. While the company continues to manage intermodal logistics, it no longer utilizes its own branded containers.

=== Historical fleet ===
- Argonaut Lines
  - Atlantic
  - Charles H. Cramp
  - Henry S. Grove
  - Lancaster
  - Pacific
  - Sagadahoc
- United States Shipping Board (USSB)
  - Challenger
  - Glade
  - Eastern Glen
  - SS West Cawthon
  - West Isleta
  - West Cheswald
  - Western Knight
- War Shipping Administration - owner (ASAL) operator
  - SS Samuel Ashe
  - SS Bernard Carter
  - Chincha
  - SS Jeremiah M. Daily
  - SS Minnie M. Fiske
  - Daniel Morgan
  - SS Henry St. George Tucker
  - Escanana Victory (USS Regulus (AF-57)
  - SS Maritime Victory
  - SS George Washington Carver
  - William Hopper
- Farrell Lines Steamship Inc
  - SS Argonaut
  - SS Resolute
  - African Comet (1)
  - African Comet (2)
  - African Dawn
  - African Dawn (2)
  - African Endeavor
  - African Enterprise
  - African Glade
  - African Glen
  - African Grove
  - African Lightning
  - African Meteor (1)
  - African Meteor (2)
  - African Mercury
  - African Moon
  - African Neptune
  - African Patriot
  - African Pilgrim
  - African Pilot
  - African Planet (1)
  - African Planet (2)
  - African Rainbow
  - African Star (1)
  - African Star (2)
  - African Sun
  - Austral Endurance
  - Austral Energy
  - Austral Ensign
  - Austral Entente
  - Austral Envoy
  - Austral Glen
  - Austral Lighting
  - Austral Moon
  - Austral Patriot
  - Austral Pilgrim
  - Austral Pilot
  - Austral Pioneer
  - Austral Puritan
  - Austral Rainbow
  - Australian Gem
  - Australian Gulf
  - Australian Surf
  - City of New York
  - Highlands
  - James A. Farrell
  - Manderson Victory
  - Richard Bland
  - Soubarissen
- Farrell Lines International:
  - M/V Kpo
  - M/V Farmington
  - M/V Cestos
  - M/V Cavalla
- American Export Lines
  - CV Lightning
  - CV Staghound
  - Defiance
  - Axport Adventurer
  - Export Agent
  - Export Aide
  - Export Ambassador
  - Export Banner
  - Export Bay
  - Export Builder
  - Export Buyer
  - Export Challenger
  - Export Champion
  - Export Commerce
  - Export Courier
  - Export Defender
  - Export Democracy
  - Export Diplomat
  - Four Aces
  - Export Freedom
  - Export Leader
  - Export Patriot
  - Great Republic
  - Red Jacket
  - Young America
- Farrell Lines Incorporated
  - Alliance Beaumont
  - Alliance Charleston
