= James Bowron =

Chairman of Gulf States steel corporation

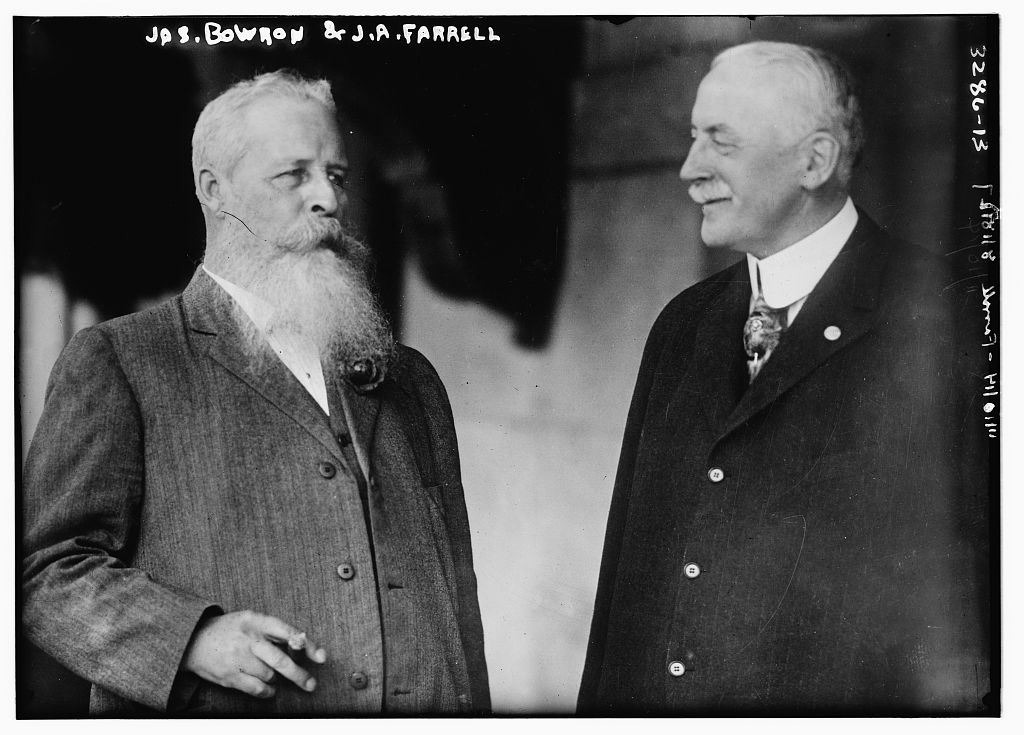
James Augustine Farrell and James Bowron in 1914

James Bowron (November 16, 1844 - August 26, 1928) was chairman of the board of the Gulf States Steel Corporation.

== Biography ==
He was born in Stockton-on-Tees, England on November 16, 1844. He married Ada Louisa Barrett on June 20, 1870. He and his father migrated to South Pittsburg, Tennessee around 1875. They started a small iron manufacturing business. In 1882 the Tennessee Coal, Iron, and Railroad Company purchased their company and Bowron became the treasurer of the merged company.

He died of August 26, 1928 in Birmingham, Alabama.
