= National Foreign Trade Council =

United States-based trade association

The National Foreign Trade Council (NFTC) is a United States trade association formed in 1914. It focuses on policy issues related to international trade and taxation. The organization is based in Washington, D.C., and its current president is Jake Colvin.

== History ==
The NFTC was established in 1914 following a resolution passed at the first National Foreign Trade Convention. James A. Farrell, then president of U.S. Steel, served as the organization's first chairman. Its early work focused on trade with Caribbean and Latin American countries, later expanding to broader trade policy issues.

== Activities ==
The NFTC advocates for trade and export finance policies intended to support its member companies in international markets. The organization has been involved in legal cases, including Crosby v. National Foreign Trade Council, which resulted in the Supreme Court of the United States overturning the Massachusetts Burma Law.

Current areas of focus for the NFTC include investment, taxation, export finance, and workforce-related issues connected to international trade.
