= Maupertuis Bay =

- Location in South Australia
- Location: Flinders Chase, South Australia
- Coordinates: 35°59′46″S 136°39′36″E
- Type: Bay
- Primary inflows: Rocky River
- Basin countries: Australia
- Max. length: 13 kilometres (8.1 mi)
- Max. width: about 3 kilometres (1.9 mi)
- Average depth: 30–60 metres (98–197 ft)

Maupertuis Bay (French: Baie Maupertuis) is a bay in the Australian state of South Australia located on the south-west coastline of Kangaroo Island.

It faces to the south-west and extends for a distance of about 13 kilometres (8.1 mi) from an unnamed headland in the north-west to Cape du Couedic in the south-east. Its coastline is located within the locality of Flinders Chase.

Rivers draining into the bay includes the Rocky River which rises from within a catchment located in both the Flinders Chase National Park and the Ravine des Casoars Wilderness Protection Area.

Maupertuis Bay was named after mathematician and philosopher Pierre Louis Maupertuis by the French explorer Nicolas Baudin.

On 24 April 1899, the Scottish barque Loch Sloy was wrecked off the coast from Maupertuis Bay resulting in the deaths of all but three of its 32 crew and passengers.

Since 2012, the waters of the bay have been located within a "habitat protection zone" with the Western Kangaroo Island Marine Park which is managed by the Government of South Australia.

== See also ==
- Maupertuis (disambiguation)
