= Rocky River (Kangaroo Island) =

Rocky
- Location of the river mouth in South Australia

Location
- Country: Australia
- State: South Australia
- Region: Kangaroo Island
- Locality: Flinders Chase

Physical characteristics
- Mouth: Maupertuis Bay
  - coordinates: 35°57′56″S 136°39′10″E
- Length: 40 km (25 mi)
- Basin size: 216 km^{2} (83 sq mi)

Basin features
- Protected areas: Flinders Chase National Park; Ravine des Casoars Wilderness Protection Area

The Rocky River is a stream in the Australian state of South Australia located on the west end of Kangaroo Island in the locality of Flinders Chase.

Rocky River flows in a generally south-westerly direction over a distance of approximately 40 kilometres (25 mi) and discharges into Maupertuis Bay on the island's west coast. The catchment area of approximately 216 square kilometres (83 sq mi) is considered to be the only river catchment in South Australia essentially unaffected by land clearing and other human impacts and is located within the boundaries of the protected areas Flinders Chase National Park and Ravine des Casoars Wilderness Protection Area.

== See also ==
- List of rivers of Australia § South Australia
