= County of Carnarvon (South Australia) =

Carnarvon South Australia
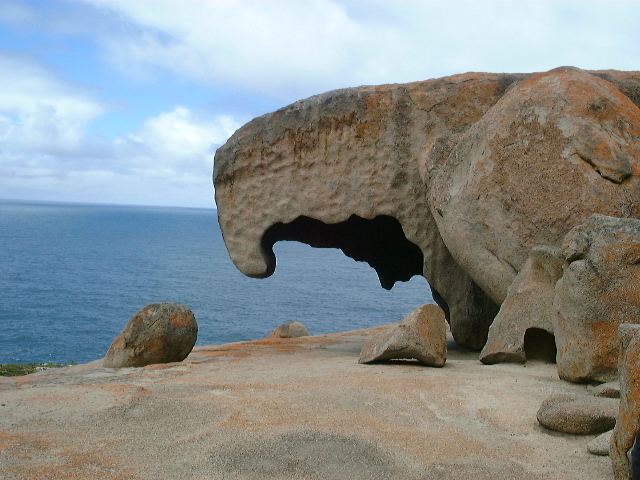
- Remarkable Rocks formation in Flinders Chase within the Hundred of McDonald

- Coordinates: 35.807920°S 137.284350°E
- Established: 1874; 151 years ago
- LGA(s): Kangaroo Island Council
- Region: Fleurieu and Kangaroo Island
Lands administrative divisions around Carnarvon:
Ocean	Investigator Strait	Hindmarsh
Ocean	Carnarvon	Ocean
Ocean	Ocean	Ocean
- Footnotes: Coordinates

County of Carnarvon is a cadastral unit located in the Australian state of South Australia which covers the full extent of Kangaroo Island. It was proclaimed in 1874 by Governor Musgrave in response to the demand for agriculture land on Kangaroo Island.

== Description ==
The County of Carnarvon covers the full extent of Kangaroo Island and “all islands adjacent thereto.”

== History ==
The County of Carnarvon was gazetted in 1874 in response to the demand for agricultural land on Kangaroo Island. The county was proclaimed by Anthony Musgrave, the ninth Governor of South Australia on 13 August 1874 along with the first of its constituent hundreds, the Hundred of Dudley. The county was named after Henry Herbert, 4th Earl of Caernarfon, Wales who served two terms as the British Secretary of State for the Colonies. The following twelve hundreds were proclaimed within the County between the years 1874 and 1960 - Dudley in 1874, Menzies in 1878, Haines in 1883, Cassini in 1884, MacGillivray in 1906, Seddon in 1908, Newland in 1909, Duncan in 1909, Ritchie in 1909, McDonald in 1910, Gosse in 1931, and Borda in 1960. A thirteenth hundred was proposed during the 1930s but was never proclaimed - the Hundred of Baudin (35°53′45″S 136°37′14″E).

== List of constituent hundreds ==
=== Description of layout of the hundreds ===
The hundreds located within the County of Carnarvon are laid out as follows (from west to east) - Borda, Gosse, Duncan, Cassini and Menzies overlooking the north coast of the island, MacDonald, Ritchie, Newland, Seddon and MacGillivray overlooking the south coast of the island, with Haines occupying the full extent of the island south of Nepean Bay and Dudley occupying the full extent of the Dudley Peninsula.

=== Hundred of Borda ===
The Hundred of Borda (35°47′40″S 136°40′50″E was proclaimed on 4 February 1960 and was named after the headland, Cape Borda. Its extent includes the locality of Cape Borda and part of Flinders Chase.

=== Hundred of Cassini ===
The Hundred of Cassini (35°40′20″S 137°18′02″E) was proclaimed on 8 May 1884. It covers an area of 270 square kilometres (104 sq mi) and was named after the headland, Cape Cassini. Its extent includes most of the locality of Cassini and a small section of the locality of Duncan.

=== Hundred of Dudley ===
The Hundred of Dudley (35°48′16″S 137°58′09″E) was proclaimed on 13 August 1874. It covers an area of 390 square kilometres (149 sq mi) principally on what is now the Dudley Peninsula and was named after the American jurist, Dudley Field who was the father-in-law of Governor Musgrave. Its extent includes the localities of American Beach, Antechamber Bay, Baudin Beach, Brown Beach, Cuttlefish Bay, Dudley East, Dudley West, Island Beach, Kangaroo Head, Ironstone, Pelican Lagoon, Penneshaw, Porky Flat, Sapphiretown, Willoughby and Willson River.

=== Hundred of Duncan ===
The Hundred of Duncan (35°44′52″S 137°06′57″E) was proclaimed on 9 December 1909. It covers an area of 400 square kilometres (156 sq mi) and was named after John Duncan, a South Australian politician and pastoralist. Its extent includes the localities of Middle River and Stokes Bay, most of the locality of Duncan, and parts of the localities of Gosse, Newland, Seddon and Western River.

=== Hundred of Gosse ===
The Hundred of Gosse (35°45′52″S 136°53′30″E) was proclaimed on 25 June 1931. It covers an area of 364 square kilometres (140.5 sq mi) and was named after William Christie Gosse, an explorer and a former Deputy Surveyor-General in South Australia. Its extent includes the locality of De Mole River, most of the locality of Western River, and parts of the localities of Gosse and Flinders Chase.

=== Hundred of Haines ===
The Hundred of Haines (35°49′13″S 137°39′10″E) was proclaimed on 10 May 1883. It covers an area of 370 square kilometres (141 sq mi) and was named after William Haines, a South Australian politician. Its extent includes the localities of American River, Ballast Head, D'Estrees Bay, Haines, Muston and nearly all of Nepean Bay.

=== Hundred of MacGillivray ===
The Hundred of MacGillivray (35°52′51″S 137°28′40″E) was proclaimed on 20 December 1906. It originally covered an area of 374.9 square kilometres (144.75 sq mi) which was expanded in 1945 to 553.6 square kilometres (213.75 sq mi). It was named after Ivor MacGillivray, a South Australian politician. Its extent includes nearly all of the localities of Macgillivray and Birchmore and parts of Kohinoor and Menzies.

=== Hundred of McDonald ===
The Hundred of McDonald (35°56′14″S 136°46′05″E) was proclaimed on 27 January 1910. It was named after Alexander McDonald, a South Australian politician. It includes parts of the localities of Flinders Chase, Karatta and Gosse, with most of the hundred being located within parts of the Flinders Chase National Park and the Ravine des Casoars Wilderness Protection Area.

=== Hundred of Menzies ===
The Hundred of Menzies (35°39′35″S 137°29′11″E) was proclaimed on 11 April 1878. It covered an area of 320 square kilometres (124 sq mi) and was named after a Lord Menzies who is described as being a friend of William Jervois, the tenth Governor of South Australia. Its extent includes the localities of Bay of Shoals, Brownlow KI, Cygnet River, Emu Bay, Kingscote, North Cape and Wisanger, nearly all of the locality of Menzies and parts of the localities of Birchmore and Nepean Bay.

=== Hundred of Newland ===
The Hundred of Newland (35°55′16″S 137°06′27″E) was proclaimed on 4 March 1909. It covers an area of 400 square kilometres (154 sq mi) and was named after John Newlands, a South Australian politician. Its extent includes part of the localities of Gosse, Karatta, Newland, Seddon, Stun'Sail Boom and Vivonne Bay.

=== Hundred of Ritchie ===
The Hundred of Ritchie (35°55′44″S 136°56′06″E) was proclaimed on 9 December 1909. It covers an area of 400 square kilometres (154 sq mi) and was named after George Ritchie, a South Australian politician. Its extent includes parts of the localities of Gosse, Karatta and Stun'Sail Boom.

=== Hundred of Seddon ===
The Hundred of Seddon (35°51′38″S 137°18′02″E) was proclaimed on 31 January 1908. It covers an area of 400 square kilometres (156 sq mi) and was named after Richard Seddon, a former Prime Minister of New Zealand. Its extent includes the localities of Parndana and Seal Bay, most of the locality of Seddon, and parts of the localities of Cassini, Duncan, Kohinoor, MacGillivray, Newland and Vivonne Bay.

== See also ==
- Lands administrative divisions of South Australia
- Carnarvon (disambiguation)
