= Mount Taylor Conservation Park =

Protected area in South Australia

- IUCN category III (natural monument or feature)
- Location within South Australia
- Location: South Australia
- Nearest city: Vivonne Bay
- Coordinates: 35°55′48.1″S 137°3′8.1″E
- Area: 18 ha (44 acres)
- Established: 1 January 1970
- Governing body: Department for Environment and Water

Mount Taylor Conservation Park is a protected area in the Australian state of South Australia located on Kangaroo Island in the gazetted locality of Newland. It was dedicated in 1970 primarily for the conservation of the rare triggerplant Stylidium tepperianum.

== Description ==
The conservation park has an area of 18 hectares (44 acres). It lies near the eastern end of Flinders Chase National Park, about 10 kilometres (6.2 miles) south-east of American River and 13 kilometres (8.1 miles) north-west of Vivonne Bay on the southern coast of the island. It encompasses Mount Taylor, a large rounded hill. The conservation park's vegetation is mostly an open scrubland and heath of Eucalyptus diversifolia, E. baxteri and E. cosmophylla, over Acacia myrtifolia and Pultenaea aceroa. It contains small patches of E. leucoxylon / E. cladocalyx woodland. Tepper's triggerplant occurs in the understorey.

The conservation park is classified as an IUCN Category III protected area.

== See also ==
- Protected areas of South Australia
