= Newland, South Australia =

Newland
- Town
- Coordinates: 35.872340°S 137.122910°E
- Country: Australia
- State: South Australia
- Region: Fleurieu and Kangaroo Island
- LGA: Kangaroo Island Council
- Location: 168 km (104 mi) south-west of Adelaide; 50 km (31 mi) south-west of Kingscote
- Established: 2002

Government
  - State electorate: Mawson
  - Federal division: Mayo

Population
  - Total: 52 (SAL 2021)
- Time zone: UTC+9:30 (ACST)
  - Summer (DST): UTC+10:30 (ACST)
- Postcode: 5223
- County: Carnarvon
- Mean max temp: 21.0 °C (69.8 °F)
- Mean min temp: 9.0 °C (48.2 °F)
- Annual rainfall: 444.0 mm (17.48 in)
Localities around Newland
| Duncan | Duncan | Duncan |
| Gosse; Karatta | Newland | Seddon |
| Karatta | Vivonne Bay | Vivonne Bay |
- Coordinates; Locations; Climate; Adjoining localities

Newland is a locality in the Australian state of South Australia located on Kangaroo Island about 168 kilometres (104 miles) south-west of the state capital of Adelaide and about 50 kilometres (31 miles) south-west of the municipal seat of Kingscote.

Its boundaries were created in May 2002 for the “long established name” which was derived from the cadastral unit of the Hundred of Newland. The Playford Highway forms the northern boundary of the locality.

The principal land use in the locality is primary production with land of an area of 18 hectares (44 acres) in its south-west corner zoned for conservation and occupied by the Mount Taylor Conservation Park.

Newland is located within the federal division of Mayo, the state electoral district of Mawson and the local government area of the Kangaroo Island Council.
