= Casuarina (disambiguation) =

Casuarina is a genus of plants from the family Casuarinaceae

Casuarina can also refer to:

- Casuarina, New South Wales
- Casuarina, Northern Territory
  - Electoral division of Casuarina, an electoral division of the Northern Territory
- Casuarina, Western Australia
- Casuarina Islets, a pair of islets in South Australia.
- Casuarina Prison, a prison in Western Australia.
- Westin Casuarina Las Vegas Hotel, Casino & Spa
- Casuarina (band), a Brazilian samba and choro band
- Casuarina Square, a shopping mall in Darwin, NT, Australia
