= Kangaroo Island bushfires =

Kangaroo Island bushfires may refer to:

- 2007 Kangaroo Island bushfires
- 2020 Kangaroo Island bushfires
