= Duncan, South Australia =

Duncan
- Town
- Coordinates: 35°46′31″S 137°07′09″E
- Country: Australia
- State: South Australia
- Region: Fleurieu and Kangaroo Island
- LGA: Kangaroo Island Council
- Location: 162 km (101 mi) south-west of Adelaide; 49 km (30 mi) west of Kingscote
- Established: 2002

Government
  - State electorate: Mawson
  - Federal division: Mayo

Population
  - Total: 67 (SAL 2021)
- Time zone: UTC+9:30 (ACST)
  - Summer (DST): UTC+10:30 (ACST)
- Postcode: 5223
- County: Carnarvon
- Mean max temp: 21.0 °C (69.8 °F)
- Mean min temp: 9.0 °C (48.2 °F)
- Annual rainfall: 444.0 mm (17.48 in)
Localities around Duncan
| Western River | Middle River; Stokes Bay | Cassini |
| Gosse | Duncan | Cassini; Parndana |
| Gosse | Newland; Seddon | Seddon |
- Coordinates; Locations; Climate; Adjoining localities

Duncan is a locality in the Australian state of South Australia located on Kangaroo Island about 162 kilometres (101 miles) south-west of the state capital of Adelaide and about 49 kilometres (30 miles) west of the municipal seat of Kingscote.

Its boundaries were created in May 2002 for the “long established name” which was derived from the cadastral unit of the Hundred of Duncan. The Playford Highway forms the southern boundary of the locality.

The principal land use in the locality is primary production with land on the western side of the locality located in a ‘water protection zone’ in order to manage the aquifer system existing within Duncan and adjoining localities.

Duncan is located within the federal division of Mayo, the state electoral district of Mawson and the local government area of the Kangaroo Island Council.
