= Carnarvon =

Carnarvon and Caernarvon are forms of the name Caernarfon which are no longer used for the town in north Wales, but remain in use in other contexts. The first two forms are in English orthography and the third is the Welsh spelling, adopted in English since the 1970s. Most places and things named after Caernarfon use one of the former spellings.

== Places ==
=== Australia ===
Queensland

- Carnarvon Range
- Carnarvon Highway, state highway
- Carnarvon National Park
  - Carnarvon Gorge
- Carnarvon Park, Queensland, a locality in the Central Highlands Region
- Carnarvon Station Reserve

South Australia

- County of Carnarvon (South Australia), a cadastral unit of land administration on Kangaroo Island

Western Australia

- Carnarvon xeric shrublands, IBRA region
- Carnarvon, Western Australia, coastal town
  - Carnarvon Airport (Western Australia)
- Carnarvon County, Western Australia
- Carnarvon Range (Western Australia)
- Carnarvon Tracking Station
- Carnarvon xeric shrublands, deserts and xeric shrublands ecoregion
- OTC Satellite Earth Station Carnarvon
- Shire of Carnarvon, local government area

=== Canada ===
- Caernarvon (Edmonton), residential neighbourhood in Edmonton, Alberta
- Carnarvon Avenue, Upper Lonsdale, District of North Vancouver, British Columbia
- Carnarvon Elementary School, Vancouver, British Columbia
- Carnarvon Park (next to Carnarvon Elementary School), Vancouver, British Columbia
- Carnarvon Park, District of Oak Bay, Vancouver Island, British Columbia
- Carnarvon Street, City of Victoria and District of Oak Bay, Vancouver Island, British Columbia
- Carnarvon (Ontario), hamlet in Minden Hills, Haliburton County, Ontario
- Mount Carnarvon, Yoho National Park, Kootenay Land District, British Columbia

=== Hong Kong ===
- Carnarvon Road, Tsim Sha Tsui, Kowloon

=== New Zealand ===
- Carnarvon, former name of the small town of Himatangi

=== South Africa ===
- Carnarvon, South Africa, town in the Karoo region
  - Carnarvon Airport (South Africa)

=== United Kingdom (Wales) ===
- Caernarfon, town in Gwynedd, north-west Wales
  - Caernarfon Airport
  - Caernarfon Castle, castle constructed by King Edward I of England
  - Caernarvon railway station (closed 1970, originally spelled "Carnarvon")
  - Caernarfon railway station (Welsh Highland Railway, opened 1997)
  - Carnarvon (Pant) railway station a temporary terminus on the town's southern outskirts in the late 1860s
  - Carnarvon (Morfa) railway station a temporary terminus on the town's southern edge in the late 1860s
  - Carnarvon Castle railway station, northern passenger terminus of the Nantlle Railway in the mid-nineteenth century
  - Caernarfon Town F.C., football team in the League of Wales
  - CR Caernarfon, rugby union team in the Welsh Rugby Union Division Four North League
- Caernarfon Bay, inlet of the Irish Sea defined by the Llŷn peninsula and Anglesey
- Caernarfon (National Assembly for Wales constituency)
- Caernarfon (UK Parliament constituency)
- Caernarfonshire, also spelt Caernarvonshire or Carnarvonshire, one of thirteen historic counties of Wales

=== United States of America ===
- Carnarvon, Iowa
- Caernarvon, Louisiana
- Caernarvon Township, Berks County, Pennsylvania
- Caernarvon Township, Lancaster County, Pennsylvania

== People ==
- Earl of Carnarvon, a title created more than once
  - Robert Dormer, 1st Earl of Carnarvon (1610–1643)
  - Charles Dormer, 2nd Earl of Carnarvon (1632–1709)
  - James Brydges, 1st Duke of Chandos, 1st Earl of Carnarvon (1673–1744)
  - Henry Herbert, 1st Earl of Carnarvon (1741–1811)
  - Henry Herbert, 2nd Earl of Carnarvon (1772–1833)
  - Henry Herbert, 3rd Earl of Carnarvon (1800–1849)
  - Henry Herbert, 4th Earl of Carnarvon (1831–1890)
  - George Herbert, 5th Earl of Carnarvon (1866–1923), financed the excavations which discovered Tutankhamun's tomb
  - Henry Herbert, 6th Earl of Carnarvon (1898–1987)
  - Henry Herbert, 7th Earl of Carnarvon (1924–2001)
  - George Herbert, 8th Earl of Carnarvon (born 1956)

== Ships ==
- HMS Carnarvon (1903), Royal Navy cruiser
- HMS Carnarvon Bay (K630), Royal Navy frigate, launched 1945

== Other ==
- 1945 Caernarvon Boroughs by-election
- Caernarvon tank, a developmental UK heavy tank of 1952
- Carnarvonia (disambiguation)
- Carnarvonshire Railway
