= Fides Bluff =

Fides Bluff South Australia
- Coordinates: 35°41′49″S 136°50′18″E
- Location: 70 km (43 mi) west of Kingscote

Fides Bluff is a headland in the Australian state of South Australia located on the north coast of Kangaroo Island in the gazetted locality of De Mole River about 70 kilometres (43 miles) west of the municipal seat of Kingscote.

It was named by the Government of South Australia on 23 October 2003 to commemorate the loss of the Finnish barque Fides which was wrecked on the nearby coastline on 22 May 1860 with the loss of her captain and 10 of her 14 crew. A plaque was unveiled at Fides Bluff by Mike Rann, the Premier of South Australia, and Anneli Puura-Märkälä, the Finnish Ambassador to Australia on 7 December 2003 to commemorate the naming of the headland.
