= Cape Borda, South Australia =

Cape Borda
- Town
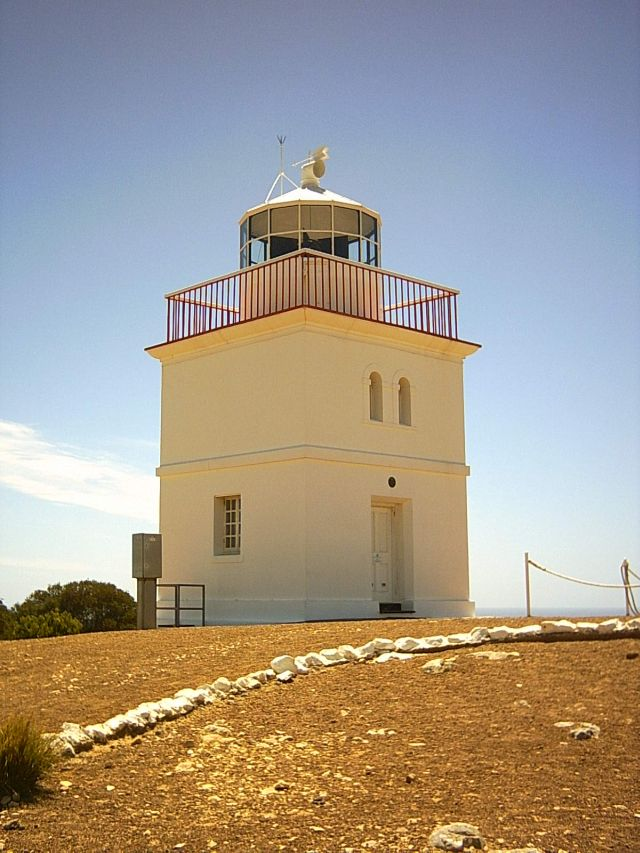
- Cape Borda Lighthouse

- Coordinates: 35.752910°S 136.593390°E
- Country: Australia
- State: South Australia
- Region: Fleurieu and Kangaroo Island
- LGA: Kangaroo Island Council
- Location: 192 km (119 mi) south-west of Adelaide; 95 km (59 mi) west of Kingscote
- Established: 2002

Government
  - State electorate: Mawson
  - Federal division: Mayo
- Elevation: 158 m (518 ft)

Population
  - Total: 9 (SAL 2021)
- Time zone: UTC+9:30 (ACST)
  - Summer (DST): UTC+10:30 (ACST)
- Postcode: 5223
- County: Carnarvon
- Mean max temp: 19.1 °C (66.4 °F)
- Mean min temp: 11.6 °C (52.9 °F)
- Annual rainfall: 531.6 mm (20.93 in)
Localities around Cape Borda
Investigator Strait
Cape Borda	De Mole River; Gosse
Flinders Chase	Flinders Chase
- Distances; Coordinates; Climate; Adjoining localities

Cape Borda is a locality in the Australian state of South Australia located on Kangaroo Island about 192 kilometres (119 miles) south-west of the state capital of Adelaide.

Its boundaries were created in 2002 in respect to “the long established name” which is reported to be derived from the navigation aid within its boundaries - the Cape Borda Lightstation.

The major land uses within the locality includes conservation and primary production with the former land use including the following protected areas - the Flinders Chase National Park, the Ravine des Casoars Wilderness Protection Area and the Cape Torrens Wilderness Protection Area. Part of the southern boundary of Cape Borda is formed by the Playford Highway.

The locality includes the three following state heritage places - Harveys Return Cemetery, the Cape Borda Lighthouse and the Harveys Return Landing Site.

Cape Borda is located within the federal division of Mayo, the state electoral district of Mawson and the local government area of the Kangaroo Island Council.

== Climate ==
Cape Borda has a warm-summer mediterranean climate (Köppen: Csb) with tepid, dry summers and mild, relatively wet winters. On average, the town experiences 181.0 cloudy days and only 49.2 clear days per annum. Extreme temperatures ranged from 40.0 °C (104.0 °F) on 28 January 2009 to 1.8 °C (35.2 °F) on 12 June 1999. The wettest recorded day was 23 March 1877 with 93.7 mm (3.69 in) of rainfall.

The original weather station recorded temperature, precipitation, solar exposure, 9 am and 3 pm conditions. It was closed in 2007.

Climate data for Cape Borda Comparison (35.75°S 136.59°E) (143 m (469 ft) AMSL) (1865-2007)
Month	Jan	Feb	Mar	Apr	May	Jun	Jul	Aug	Sep	Oct	Nov	Dec	Year
Record high °C (°F)	39.0 (102.2)	36.8 (98.2)	34.0 (93.2)	29.2 (84.6)	24.8 (76.6)	20.4 (68.7)	20.0 (68.0)	22.0 (71.6)	26.5 (79.7)	32.6 (90.7)	34.4 (93.9)	37.0 (98.6)	39.0 (102.2)
Mean daily maximum °C (°F)	23.0 (73.4)	23.3 (73.9)	21.3 (70.3)	18.7 (65.7)	16.4 (61.5)	14.6 (58.3)	13.9 (57.0)	14.0 (57.2)	15.1 (59.2)	16.9 (62.4)	19.4 (66.9)	21.2 (70.2)	18.2 (64.7)
Mean daily minimum °C (°F)	13.8 (56.8)	14.3 (57.7)	13.5 (56.3)	12.4 (54.3)	11.2 (52.2)	9.8 (49.6)	9.1 (48.4)	8.9 (48.0)	9.3 (48.7)	10.0 (50.0)	11.2 (52.2)	12.5 (54.5)	11.3 (52.4)
Record low °C (°F)	6.1 (43.0)	8.0 (46.4)	7.2 (45.0)	6.7 (44.1)	3.3 (37.9)	1.8 (35.2)	2.2 (36.0)	2.2 (36.0)	2.8 (37.0)	3.3 (37.9)	4.1 (39.4)	6.0 (42.8)	1.8 (35.2)
Average precipitation mm (inches)	15.4 (0.61)	16.9 (0.67)	23.7 (0.93)	45.2 (1.78)	79.0 (3.11)	106.4 (4.19)	104.2 (4.10)	86.5 (3.41)	55.3 (2.18)	41.7 (1.64)	26.1 (1.03)	21.0 (0.83)	620.7 (24.44)
Average precipitation days (≥ 0.2 mm)	5.4	5.0	7.5	11.9	17.1	19.6	21.2	19.8	16.0	12.8	8.7	7.5	152.5
Average afternoon relative humidity (%)	54	55	59	65	71	73	74	72	70	65	59	58	65
Average dew point °C (°F)	10.9 (51.6)	11.3 (52.3)	11.1 (52.0)	10.3 (50.5)	9.8 (49.6)	8.6 (47.5)	7.9 (46.2)	7.6 (45.7)	8.0 (46.4)	8.3 (46.9)	8.8 (47.8)	10.2 (50.4)	9.4 (48.9)
Source: Bureau of Meteorology (1865-2007)

A newer weather station was opened in 2002. It records temperature, precipitation and solar exposure.

Climate data for Cape Borda (35.75°S 136.60°E) (158 m (518 ft) AMSL) (2002-2025)
Month	Jan	Feb	Mar	Apr	May	Jun	Jul	Aug	Sep	Oct	Nov	Dec	Year
Record high °C (°F)	40.0 (104.0)	37.9 (100.2)	35.5 (95.9)	30.3 (86.5)	24.6 (76.3)	20.9 (69.6)	18.1 (64.6)	21.0 (69.8)	25.6 (78.1)	31.1 (88.0)	36.2 (97.2)	39.1 (102.4)	40.0 (104.0)
Mean daily maximum °C (°F)	24.6 (76.3)	23.9 (75.0)	22.6 (72.7)	19.7 (67.5)	17.0 (62.6)	15.0 (59.0)	14.3 (57.7)	14.7 (58.5)	16.0 (60.8)	18.1 (64.6)	20.6 (69.1)	22.6 (72.7)	19.1 (66.4)
Mean daily minimum °C (°F)	14.5 (58.1)	14.5 (58.1)	13.8 (56.8)	12.6 (54.7)	11.2 (52.2)	9.9 (49.8)	9.3 (48.7)	9.2 (48.6)	9.5 (49.1)	10.2 (50.4)	11.7 (53.1)	13.0 (55.4)	11.6 (52.9)
Record low °C (°F)	7.0 (44.6)	8.7 (47.7)	7.7 (45.9)	6.0 (42.8)	5.1 (41.2)	2.9 (37.2)	3.9 (39.0)	3.4 (38.1)	2.6 (36.7)	3.5 (38.3)	4.5 (40.1)	6.0 (42.8)	2.6 (36.7)
Average precipitation mm (inches)	17.8 (0.70)	15.9 (0.63)	20.3 (0.80)	37.9 (1.49)	66.1 (2.60)	94.0 (3.70)	86.1 (3.39)	69.9 (2.75)	45.9 (1.81)	30.2 (1.19)	27.6 (1.09)	22.5 (0.89)	531.6 (20.93)
Average precipitation days (≥ 0.2 mm)	5.0	4.7	8.4	12.2	18.7	19.6	21.1	21.1	16.4	11.3	9.4	8.0	155.9
Source: Bureau of Meteorology (2002-2025)

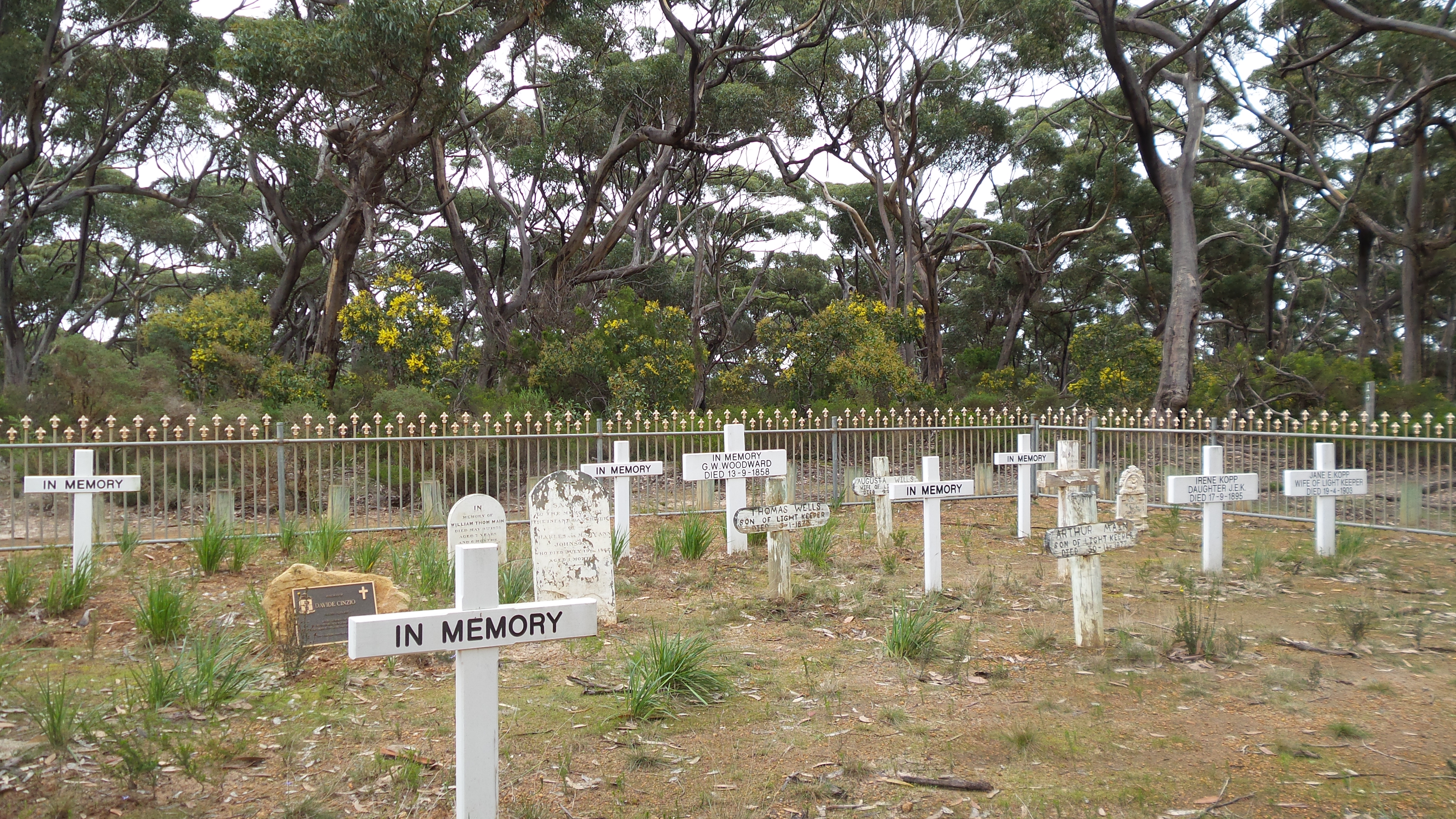
Harvey's Return cemetery

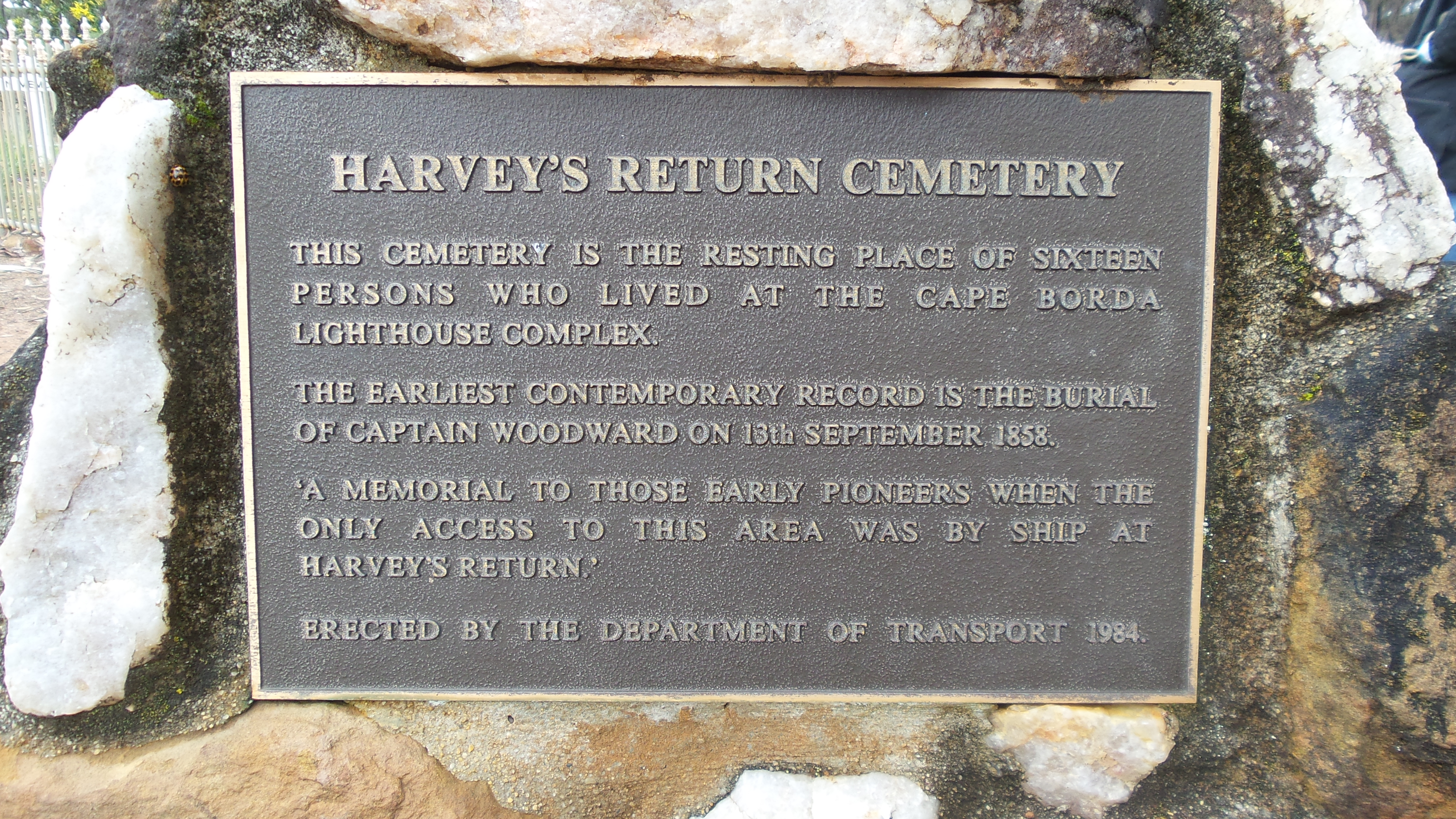
Harvey's Return plaque
