= Carnarvonia =

Carnarvonia may refer to:

- Carnarvonia (plant), a genus of plants in the family Proteaceae
- Carnarvonia (animal), an extinct genus of arthropod
