= Karatta, South Australia =

Karatta
- Town
- Coordinates: 35°58′30″S 136°56′15″E
- Country: Australia
- State: South Australia
- Region: Fleurieu and Kangaroo Island
- LGA: Kangaroo Island Council
- Location: 191 km (119 mi) south-west of Adelaide
- Established: 2002

Government
  - State electorate: Mawson
  - Federal division: Mayo

Population
  - Total: 37 (SAL 2021)
- Time zone: UTC+9:30 (ACST)
  - Summer (DST): UTC+10:30 (ACST)
- Postcode: 5223
- County: Carnarvon
- Mean max temp: 22.1 °C (71.8 °F)
- Mean min temp: 11.5 °C (52.7 °F)
- Annual rainfall: 534.0 mm (21.02 in)
Localities around Karatta
Flinders Chase	Gosse	Gosse
Flinders Chase	Karatta	Newland; Vivonne Bay; Stun’Sail Boom
Ocean	Ocean	Ocean
- Distances; Coordinates; Climate; Adjoining localities

Karatta is a locality in the Australian state of South Australia located on the south coast of Kangaroo Island overlooking the body of water known in Australia as the Southern Ocean and by international authorities as the Great Australian Bight. Karatta is located about 191 kilometres (119 miles) south-west of the state capital of Adelaide.

Its boundaries were created in 2002 in respect to “the long established name.” Its western boundary is formed by the West End Highway in the north and by the Sanderson Fire Access Track in the south.

Land use within the locality is divided largely between agriculture and conservation. The former land use includes land adjoining the coastline which has additional statutory constraints to "conserve the natural features of the coast." The latter land use including two portions of the Flinders Chase National Park with one being located in the west and the other in the north, and an area of land in the locality's south-east corner being occupied by the Cape Bouguer Wilderness Protection Area and the Kelly Hill Conservation Park.

The locality includes the Grassdale Homestead which is listed on the South Australian Heritage Register.

Karatta is located within the federal division of Mayo, the state electoral district of Mawson and the local government area of the Kangaroo Island Council.
