= Gosse, South Australia =

Gosse
- Town
- Coordinates: 35.794150°S 136.979590°E
- Country: Australia
- State: South Australia
- Region: Fleurieu and Kangaroo Island
- LGA: Kangaroo Island Council
- Location: 175 km (109 mi) south-west of Adelaide
- Established: 1961

Government
  - State electorate: Mawson
  - Federal division: Mayo

Population
  - Total: 25 (SAL 2021)
- Time zone: UTC+9:30 (ACST)
  - Summer (DST): UTC+10:30 (ACST)
- Postcode: 5223
- County: Carnarvon
- Mean max temp: 22.1 °C (71.8 °F)
- Mean min temp: 11.5 °C (52.7 °F)
- Annual rainfall: 534.0 mm (21.02 in)
Localities around Gosse
De Mole River	De Mole River	Middle River
Cape Borda; Flinders Chase	Gosse	Duncan; Newland
Flinders Chase	Karatta	Newland
- Distances; Coordinates; Climate Adjoining localities

Gosse is a locality in the Australian state of South Australia located on Kangaroo Island about 175 kilometres (109 miles) south-west of the state capital of Adelaide city centre.

The locality includes a part of the Hundred of Gosse which was proposed as the site of a soldier settlement town during the 1950s. A site was surveyed in June 1961 and gazetted as a government town in September 1961 with the name Gosse which is derived from Sir James Hay Gosse who had an interest in native fauna and flora conservation on Kangaroo Island and whose father, William Gosse, is remembered in the naming of the Hundred of Gosse. The locality's boundaries which include the former government town of Gosse were created in May 2002.

The major land uses within the locality includes conservation and primary production with the former land use consisting of land within the boundaries of the Flinders Chase National Park.

The Playford Highway passes through Gosse.

Gosse is located within the federal division of Mayo, the state electoral district of Mawson and the local government area of the Kangaroo Island Council.

== See also ==
- Gosse (disambiguation)
