= Maupertuis (disambiguation) =

Pierre Louis Maupertuis (1698–1759) was a French mathematician and philosopher.

Maupertuis may also refer to:

- Maupertuis Bay, a bay on Kangaroo Island in South Australia
- Maupertuis (crater), a lunar crater (named after Pierre Louis Maupertuis)
- Maupertuis' principle, a formulation of the principle of least action
- Maupertuis, Manche, a commune in Manche, France
- Maupertus-sur-Mer, a commune in Manche, France
- Nouaillé-Maupertuis, near the site of the 1356 Battle of Poitiers and occasionally lending its name to that battle
- Maleperduis, Malperduys or Maupertuis, the fictional lair of Reynard the Fox

== See also ==
- Malpertuis, a horror novel by the Belgian author Jean Ray
