= Little Sahara (Kangaroo Island) =

Coordinates: 35.954°S 137.246°E

Location of Little Sahara in South Australia

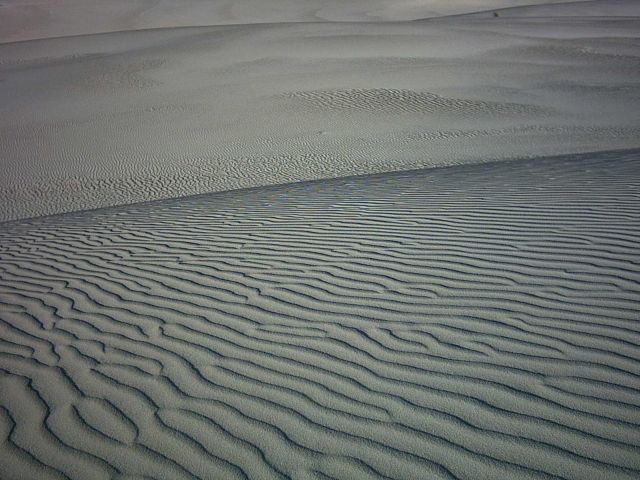
The Little Sahara dune system

Little Sahara is a dune system in the Australian state of South Australia located on Kangaroo Island in the gazetted locality of Vivonne Bay. It is a naturally occurring sand dune system roughly covering two square kilometres. The dunes vary in size with plenty of small dunes and the highest dune is approximately 70 metres above sea level.

Little Sahara is one of twenty geological features on Kangaroo Island that have been listed as a geological monument by the Geological Society of Australia.

Visitors may sand-board and toboggan on the dunes by renting the equipment from the building at the entrance located at 3733 south coast road, Vivonne Bay.
