= Playford Highway =

Road in South Australia, Australia

Playford Highway Telegraph Road, Kohinoor Road, Cape Borda Road South Australia
- Coordinates: 35.653675°S 137.641723°E (East end); 35.752966°S 136.593959°E (West end)

General information
- Type: Highway
- Length: 103 km (64 mi)
- Route number(s): B23 (1998–present) (Kingscote–Cygnet River)

Major junctions
- East end: Anzac Street; Kingscote, South Australia
- Hog Bay Road; West End Highway
- West end: No through road Cape Borda, South Australia

Location(s)
- Region: Fleurieu and Kangaroo Island
- Major settlements: Cygnet River, Parndana

Highway system
- Highways in Australia; National Highway • Freeways in Australia; Highways in South Australia

Playford Highway (with Telegraph Road and Kohinoor Road through Kingscote at its eastern end, and Cape Borda Road at its western end) is a main road on Kangaroo Island in South Australia, with its eastern end designated part of route B23. It extends from Kingscote through Cygnet River and Parndana to Cape Borda.

== Major junctions ==
Playford Highway is entirely contained within the Kangaroo Island Council local government area.

Location	km	mi	Destinations	Notes
Kingscote	0	0.0	Anzac Street – Kingscote	Eastern terminus of Telegraph Road and route B23
Kingscote	0	0.0	Esplanade (north) – Kingscote; Kingscote Terrace (south) – Kingscote	
Kingscote	0.6	0.37	Cemetery Avenue (north) – Kingscote; Cygnet Road (south) – Kingscote	Name change: Telegraph Road (east), Kohinoor Road (west)
Kingscote	1.3	0.81	Keratta Terrace – Kingscote	Name change: Kohinoor Road (east), Playford Highway (west)
Kingscote	4.0	2.5	North Coast Road – Emu Bay	
Cygnet River	7.2	4.5	Hog Bay Road (B23) – American River, Penneshaw	To ferry service to Cape Jervis; Route B23 heads south along Hog Bay Road
Cygnet River	13.8	8.6	Arronmore Road – Kingscote Airport	
Cygnet River	13.9	8.6	Birchmore Road – Vivonne Bay, Flinders Chase	
Parndana	38.5	23.9	Wedgewood Road – Seddon	
Parndana	43.4	27.0	Stokes Bay Road – Stokes Bay	
Gosse	73.2	45.5	West End Highway – Flinders Chase, Cape du Couedic	Name change: Playford Highway (east), Cape Borda Road (west)
Cape Borda	84.4	52.4	Jump Off Road – Cape Torrens Wilderness Protection Area	
Cape Borda	85.5	53.1	Shackle Road – Flinders Chase, West Bay Beach	
Cape Borda	103	64	Cape Borda Road – Cape Borda	Western terminus of Cape Borda Road
Route transition
