= Gosse =

Gosse is a surname. Notable people with the surname include:

- Bob Gosse (born 1963), American film producer and director
- Charles Gosse (1849–1885), Australian surgeon, son of William
- Clarence Gosse (1912–1996), Canadian physician and Lieutenant Governor of Nova Scotia
- Edmund Gosse (1849–1928), English poet, author and critic, son of Philip
- Emily Bowes Gosse (1806–1857), English painter and illustrator
- Étienne Gosse (1773–1834), French playwright, chansonnier and journalist
- George Gosse (1912–1964), Australian landmine clearance specialist
- Gordie Gosse (1955–2019), Canadian politician
- James Hay Gosse (1876–1952), Australian businessman, sportsman, and zoo director
- Jean-Pierre Gosse (1924–2001), Belgian biologist and ichthyologist
- John Gosse, Canadian geologist
- Marguerite Gosse (1890–1972), American politician from Nevada
- Nicolas Gosse (1787-1878), French historical painter
- Peter Gosse (born 1938), German poet, prose author and essayist
- Philip Henry Gosse (1810–1888), English naturalist, author of Omphalos: An Attempt to Untie the Geological Knot
- Sylvia Gosse (1881–1968, born Laura Gosse), English painter and engraver, daughter of Edmund
- William Gosse (disambiguation), several people:

- William Gosse (explorer) (William Christie Gosse)
- William Gosse (surgeon), British Australian doctor
- William Gosse (MP) for Bridgwater (UK Parliament constituency)
- William Gosse Hay, brother-in-law and nephew of William Christie Gosse

== See also ==
- Gosses Bluff, impact crater in the southern Northern Territory, Australia
- Gosse Ludigman (elected 989, died 1000), the sixth elected governor of Friesland
- Saint-Laurent-de-Gosse, commune in the Landes department in Aquitaine, France
- Sainte-Marie-de-Gosse, communes in the Landes department in Aquitaine, France
- Gosse, South Australia, a locality
