= Vivonne Bay, South Australia (locality) =

Vivonne Bay
- Town
- Coordinates: 35.981420°S 137.180510°E
- Country: Australia
- State: South Australia
- Region: Fleurieu and Kangaroo Island
- LGA: Kangaroo Island Council
- Location: 174 km (108 mi) southwest of Adelaide; 55 km (34 mi) southwest of Kingscote
- Established: 2002

Government
  - State electorate: Mawson
  - Federal division: Mayo

Population
  - Total: 95 (SAL 2021)
- Time zone: UTC+9:30 (ACST)
  - Summer (DST): UTC+10:30 (ACST)
- Postcode: 5223
- County: County of Carnarvon
- Mean max temp: 22.1 °C (71.8 °F)
- Mean min temp: 11.5 °C (52.7 °F)
- Annual rainfall: 534.0 mm (21.02 in)
Localities around Vivonne Bay
Karatta	Newland; Seddon	Seddon
Karatta; Stun’Sail Boom	Vivonne Bay	Seal Bay
Ocean	Ocean	Ocean
- Coordinates; Locations; Climate; Adjoining localities

Vivonne Bay is a locality in the Australian state of South Australia located on the south coast of Kangaroo Island. It is located about 174 kilometres (108 miles) southwest of the state capital of Adelaide and about 55 kilometres (34 miles) southwest of the municipal town of Kingscote.

Human settlement started in what is now the locality as the town of Vivonne which was surveyed during August 1908, named after the adjoining bay and proclaimed as a government town by Governor Bosanquet on 19 May 1909. The locality's boundaries were created in May 2002 which includes both the former government town of Vivonne and the Harriet River Shack Site, was given the “long established name” which is also derived from the adjoining bay.

Vivonne Bay is bound by the southern coast of Kangaroo Island and includes the following coast features (from west to east) - Cape Kersaint, Point Ellen and the bay known as Vivonne Bay. Two rivers, the Harriet and the Eleanor, flow throughout the locality to discharge into the bay. A dune system known as Little Sahara is located near the locality's eastern boundary. The South coast Road passes through the locality from west to east and connects to a settlement is located on the site of the former shack site via a side road. Facilities associated with the settlement include a general store located on the South Coast Road, an outdoor education facility operated by the Sealink Travel Group and a camping ground operated by the Kangaroo Island Council.

The majority land use is agriculture, with a protected area known as the Vivonne Bay Conservation Park located on the coastline immediately west of both Point Ellen and the bay.

The settlement was threatened by bushfire in December 2007, and again in January 2020. The 2007 fires resulted in the evacuation of residents after South Australian Country Fire Service determined that the area was difficult to defend and the destruction of one dwelling, with acting state premier, Kevin Foley criticising residents for not adequately clearing vegetation around their homes.

Vivonne Bay is located within the federal division of Mayo, the state electoral district of Mawson and the local government area of the Kangaroo Island Council.

== See also ==
- Vivonne (disambiguation)
