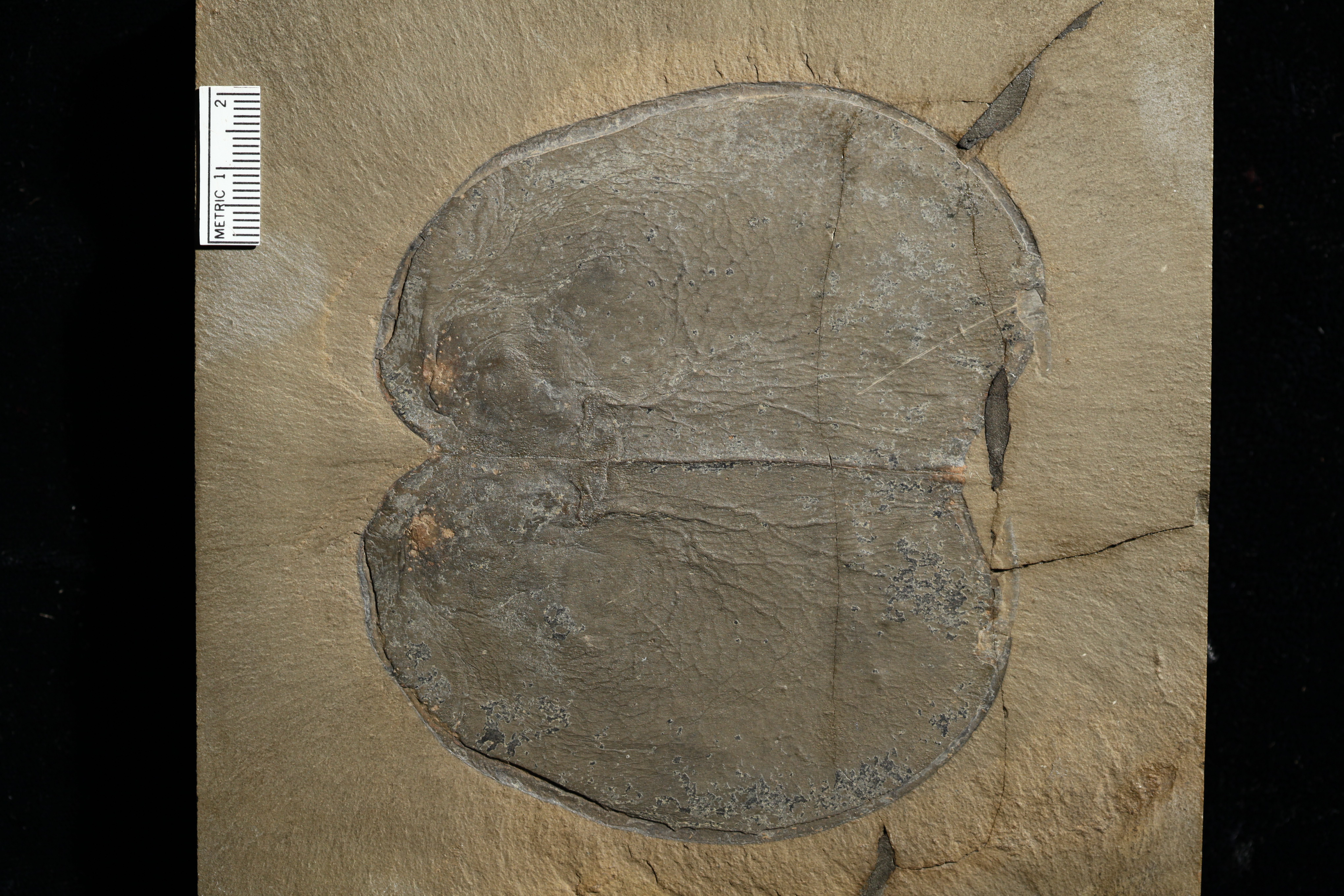
- Holotype specimen

Scientific classification
- Kingdom: Animalia
- Phylum: Arthropoda
- Genus: †Carnarvonia; Walcott, 1912
- Species: †C. venosa

Binomial name
- †Carnarvonia venosa Walcott, 1912

= Carnarvonia venosa =

Carnarvonia venosa Temporal range: Burgess Shale

Extinct species of arthropod

Carnarvonia is a genus of arthropods of uncertain affinities, known from the Middle Cambrian Burgess Shale. It is only known from a single specimen, which preserves a dorsally flattened bivalved carapace, which bears the imprints of veins, and is superficially similar in shape to those of Phyllocarida and Canadaspis, the latter of which also occurs in the Burgess Shale.
