= Cape du Couedic =

- other
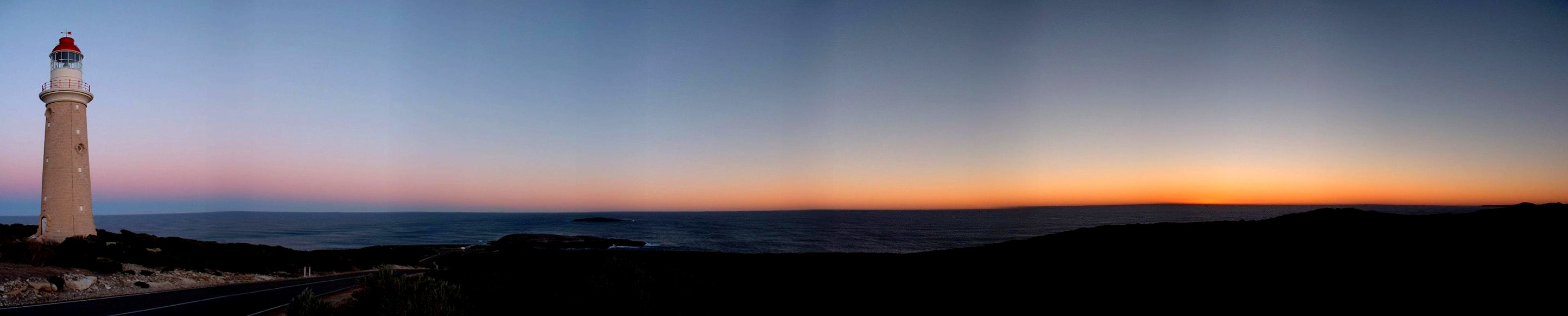
- Cape du Couedic at sunset

- Coordinates: 36°03′40″S 136°41′55″E
- Country: Australia
- State: South Australia
- Elevation: 78 m (256 ft)

Cape du Couedic is a headland in the Australian state of South Australia located on the southwest tip of Kangaroo Island in the locality of Flinders Chase. It was named after a French naval officer, Charles Louis du Couëdic de Kergoualer, by the Baudin expedition to Australia during January 1803. It is the site for the Cape du Couedic Lighthouse. It is currently located within the Flinders Chase National Park.

== Description ==
Cape du Couedic is located 96 kilometres (60 miles) southwest of the municipal seat of Kingscote at the most southwesterly point of the Kangaroo Island coast. It is the termination for a pair of coastlines - the western coastline extending from Cape Borda in the north and the southern coastline extending from Cape Willoughby in the east. It is described as "a narrow promontory about 1 mile long" (i.e. 1 nautical mile (1.9 kilometres; 1.2 miles)) and that "its SW face slopes to the sea whereas its N and S sides are steep."

== Formation, geology & oceanography ==
Cape du Couedic was formed when the sea reached its present level 7,500 years ago after sea levels started to rise at the start of the Holocene. The cliff line which includes Cape du Couedic consists of a metamorphic rock belonging to the Kanmantoo group bedrock called Middleton Sandstone. The water adjoining Cape du Couedic drops to depths ranging between 20 metres (66 feet) to 30 metres (98 feet) at the base of its cliff face.

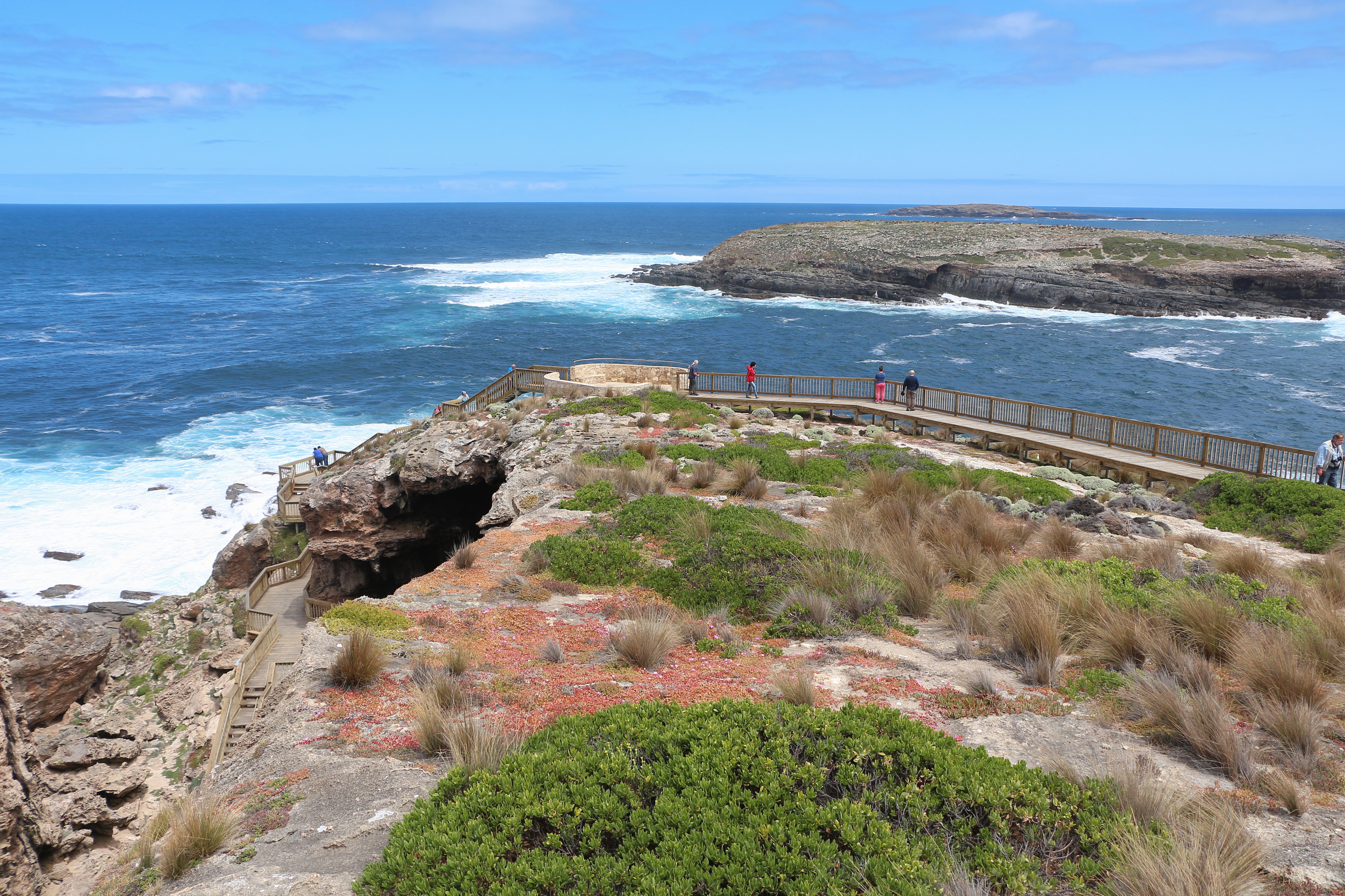
Cape du Couedic

Cape du Couedic is one of twenty geological features on Kangaroo Island that have been listed as a geological monument by the Geological Society of Australia.

== History ==
=== Aboriginal use ===
Aboriginal sites have been identified by the South Australian Museum at Cape du Couedic. As of 1999, radiocarbon dating of material recovered via archaeological excavation from sites at Cape du Couedic and Rocky River suggest Aboriginal presence in the western end of Kangaroo Island from approximately 7,500 years BP to as recent as 350–400 years BP.

=== European discovery ===
Cape du Couedic was named in January 1803 by the Baudin expedition of 1800-03 in the memory of Charles Louis Chevalier du Couëdic de Kergoualer (1740–1780), a French naval officer, who commanded the frigate La Surveilante and who died in 1780 as the result of wounds received in the action of 6 October 1779 against HMS Quebec.

== Navigation aid ==
The loss of both Loch Vennachar and Loch Sloy convinced the Marine Board of South Australia to argue for the bringing forward of a plan that it recommended in 1902 to build a lighthouse at Cape du Couedic. Its view was that the loss of both ships could have been avoided if a lighthouse had been operating at Cape du Couedic. Construction commenced in 1907 and the light was officially lit on 27 June 1909.

== Protected area status ==
Cape du Couedic is currently located within the protected area known as the Flinders Chase National Park. As of 2012, the waters surrounding its shores are part of a combined restricted access and sanctuary zone located within the boundaries of the Western Kangaroo Island Marine Park.

== Climate ==
Climate data for Cape du Couedic (75m ASL)
Month	Jan	Feb	Mar	Apr	May	Jun	Jul	Aug	Sep	Oct	Nov	Dec	Year
Mean daily maximum °C (°F)	21.5 (70.7)	21.2 (70.2)	20.8 (69.4)	18.9 (66.0)	17.0 (62.6)	15.2 (59.4)	14.4 (57.9)	14.6 (58.3)	15.9 (60.6)	17.3 (63.1)	18.4 (65.1)	20.4 (68.7)	18.0 (64.4)
Daily mean °C (°F)	17.9 (64.2)	18.0 (64.4)	17.6 (63.7)	16.0 (60.8)	14.3 (57.7)	12.8 (55.0)	11.9 (53.4)	11.9 (53.4)	12.8 (55.0)	13.9 (57.0)	15.0 (59.0)	16.6 (61.9)	14.9 (58.8)
Mean daily minimum °C (°F)	14.2 (57.6)	14.8 (58.6)	14.3 (57.7)	13.1 (55.6)	11.6 (52.9)	10.3 (50.5)	9.3 (48.7)	9.1 (48.4)	9.6 (49.3)	10.5 (50.9)	11.5 (52.7)	12.8 (55.0)	11.8 (53.2)
Average rainfall mm (inches)	16.0 (0.63)	24.5 (0.96)	23.6 (0.93)	48.2 (1.90)	74.0 (2.91)	104.6 (4.12)	110.5 (4.35)	82.0 (3.23)	55.8 (2.20)	40.2 (1.58)	29.8 (1.17)	24.6 (0.97)	634.4 (24.98)
Average rainy days	5.0	5.3	7.6	12.1	16.3	18.8	20.4	18.2	14.8	11.5	8.9	7.0	145.9
Average relative humidity (%) (at 3pm)	68	70	68	71	74	74	73	71	69	69	69	67	70

== See also ==
- Casuarina Islets
