= Ravine des Casoars Wilderness Protection Area =

Protected area in South Australia

- IUCN category Ib (wilderness area)
- Location within South Australia
- Location: South Australia, Cape Borda& Flinders Chase
- Nearest city: Kingscote
- Coordinates: 35°50′29″S 136°42′56″E
- Area: 413.63 km^{2} (159.70 sq mi)
- Established: 15 October 1993
- Governing body: Department for Environment and Water

Ravine Des Casoars Wilderness Protection Area is a protected area on the west end of Kangaroo Island in South Australia, about 80 km (50 mi) west of Kingscote. It was established in 1993 on land previously part of the Flinders Chase National Park.

== Description ==
=== Location ===
Ravine des Casoars Wilderness Protection Area is located at the north-western end of Kangaroo Island in South Australia, approximately 80 kilometres (50 mi) west of Kingscote. It is located within the gazetted localities of Cape Borda and Flinders Chase.

=== Extent ===
The wilderness protection area is bounded to the south by the West Bay Road and the West Melrose Track, to the east by the West End Highway, and the north in part by the Playford Highway. The remainder is the coastline, down to the mean low water mark, from the cove known as Harvey's Return in the north-east, to West Bay in the west. The coastline boundary excludes the former lighthouse reserve at Cape Borda, which is part of the Flinders Chase National Park.

=== Protected area designation ===
The Wilderness Protection Area is classified as an IUCN Category Ib protected area.

== History and prior use of land ==
The wilderness protection area was proclaimed on 15 October 1993, "to protect and preserve the outstandingly high wilderness qualities of the area". It was named after the Ravine des Casoars, a valley and associated drainage basin located in the northern half of the wilderness protection area. Previously, the land had been part of the Flinders Chase National Park and its predecessors since 1919.

Prior to being part of a protected area, the land which was never cleared by European colonists for agricultural or any other purpose, appears to have supported Aboriginal people on the basis of archaeological evidence. As of 1999, radiocarbon dating of material recovered via archaeological excavation from sites at Cape du Couedic and Rocky River just outside the wilderness protection area's southern boundary, suggest an Aboriginal presence from approximately 7,500 years BP, to as recent as 350–400 years BP.

== Wilderness qualities ==
The following qualities have been identified by the government agency managing the wilderness protection area:

The extensive woodlands and nature forests are virtually pristine. The area contains several complete natural drainage systems, from watershed to their discharge at sea. Wilderness quality is recorded as high over the entire area except where it is reduced in a narrow north-south band by the presence of Shackle Road, an unsealed public access road. The vegetation is biologically intact and many endemic plants are present.

== Visitor services ==
The wilderness protected area can be visited on foot via the following walking and trekking trails, which connect locations both in the wilderness protection area and the Flinders Chase National Park.

The Return Road Hike is a 4.5 kilometres (2.8 miles) walking trail that starts at Harvey's Return and finishes at the Cape Borda Lightstation.

The Flinders Chase Coastal Trek is a trekking trail between Cape du Couedic and the Ravine Des Casoars car park, on the north side of the ravine, at the southern end of Ravine Road. The trekking trail has three sections: Cape Du Couedic to Snake Lagoon (length of 16 kilometres (9.9 miles)), Snake Lagoon to West Bay (length of 20 kilometres (12 miles)) and West Bay to Ravine Des Casoars car park (length of 18 kilometres (11 miles)).
