= Flinders Chase National Park =

National park in Australia

- IUCN category II (national park)
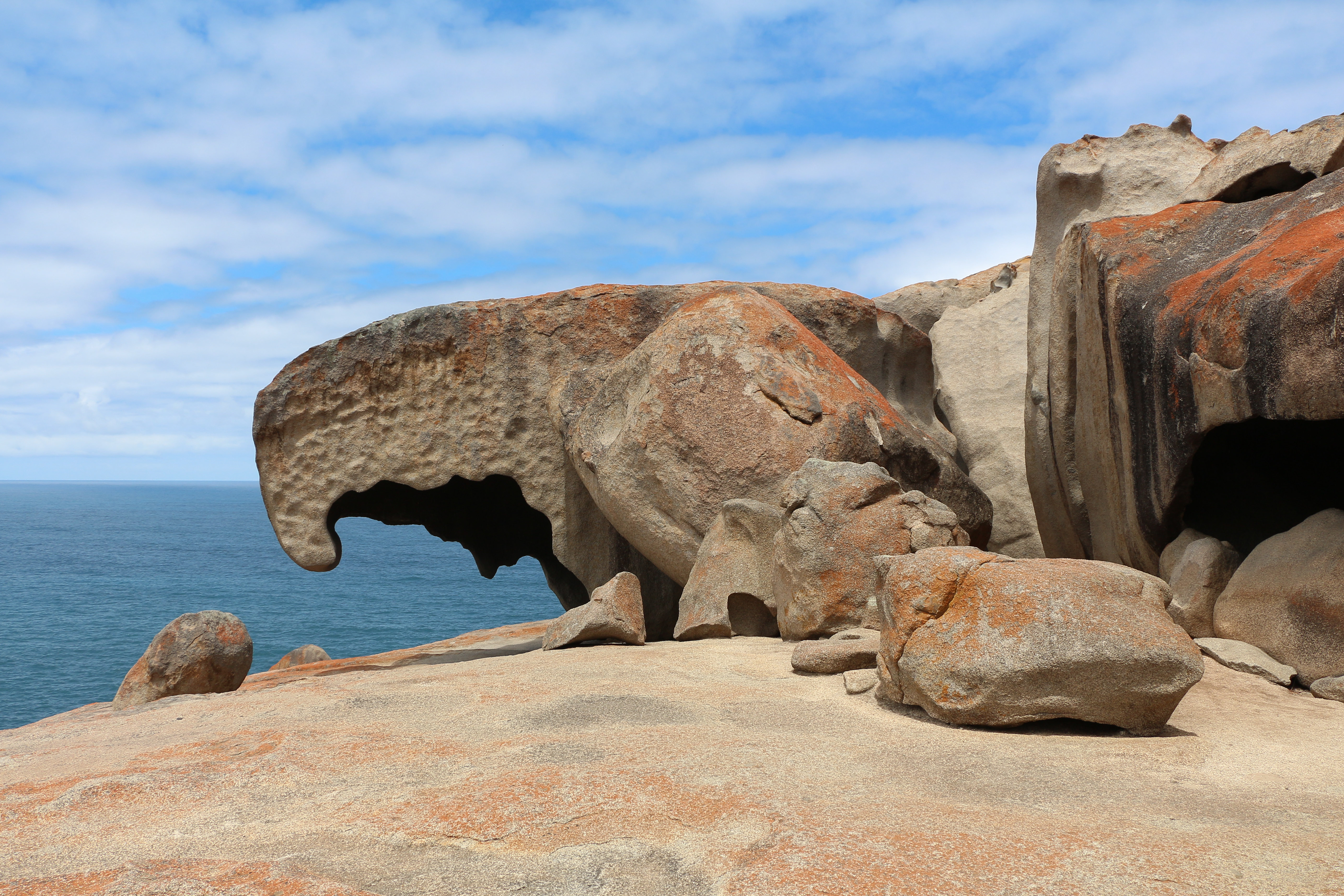
- Remarkable Rocks, in the southern part of the park

- Location within South Australia
- Location: South Australia
- Nearest city: Kingscote
- Coordinates: 35°58′38″S 136°40′22″E
- Area: 326.61 km^{2} (126.10 sq mi)
- Established: 1919; 1972 (national park)
- Governing body: Department for Environment and Water
- Website: Official website

Flinders Chase National Park (formerly Flinders Chase) is a protected area in the Australian state of South Australia located at the west end of Kangaroo Island about 177 kilometres (110 miles) west-south west of the state capital of Adelaide and 110 kilometres (68 miles) west of the municipal seat of Kingscote. It is a sanctuary for endangered species and home to a few geological phenomena. It was the second national park to be declared in South Australia.

Flinders Chase National Park consists of three sections - an area of coastal landscapes around Cape du Couedic in the south west corner of the island, the Gosse Lands in the centre of the west end of the island and the former Cape Borda Lightstation reserve in the north west corner of the island.

== Description ==
=== Location ===
Flinders Chase National Park is located at the north-western end of Kangaroo Island in South Australia approximately 110 kilometres (68 miles) west of Kingscote. It is located within the gazetted localities of Flinders Chase, Gosse and Karatta.

=== Extent ===
As of 1993, the national park consists of three separate parcels of land:

- Cape du Couedic which is refers to the main parcel of land within the national park and which is bounded at the north by the West Bay Road and the West Melrose Track, to the east by the West End Highway and an unsealed track called the Sand Dune Track; and the portion of coastline extending from West Bay in the west to Cape du Couedic in the south and to Sanderson Bay in the east. This portion of the national park includes the following islands - Paisley Islet (also known as West Bay Island) at West Bay and the Casuarina Islets immediately south of Cape du Couedic.
- The Gosse Lands - a parcel of land which is bounded by the Playford Highway to the north and the West End Highway to the west.
- The former lighthouse reserve at Cape Borda.

=== Protected area designation ===
The national park is classified as an IUCN category II protected area.

== History ==
1 Du Mole River outlet
2 Rocky River ranger station
3 Cape Borda
4 Cape Du Couedic

Following a deputation of scientists in 1906, the premier, Tom Price, agreed to set aside the Cape Borda lighthouse reserve of 61 square miles as a nature reserve. and in 1909 the South Australian government converted another 79 square miles of what had been pastoral reserve to a nature reserve, (Note: These figures are inexact: figures of 60 square miles for the first and 86 for the second have been reported.) under the control of the Fauna and Flora Board. The board had asked for 300 square miles but the additional properties needed had already been leased, and the lessees, who had yet to make any improvements, demanded £28,000 as compensation for losing what they had been getting for £28 per year Professor Stirling urged that when those leases expired they be turned over to the Board.

The reserve was named Flinders Chase at the suggestion of Samuel Dixon (died 1927). Apart from its intended use as a habitat for koalas and other mammals, it was considered a likely refuge for the lyre bird, "pheasant" (perhaps the malleefowl, [Leipoa ocellata]) and "bush turkey" (perhaps Australian brushturkey, [Alectura lathami]), all threatened on the mainland due to depredations by foxes. The Rocky River was touted as a platypus reserve.

Parts of the national park first acquired protected area status as a "flora and fauna reserve" declared on 16 October 1919 under the Fauna and Flora Reserve Act 1919, an act whose specific purpose was:

…to establish a Reserve on Kangaroo Island for the Protection, Preservation, and Propagation of Australasian Fauna and Flora, and to provide for the Control of such Reserve, and for other purposes.

No funds were made available for fencing or provision of a ranger however, and the laws regarding burning, shooting, poisoning and taking of protected species were unenforceable and broken with impunity. In 1922 the government brought the Chase's total area close to 200 square miles (520 km^{2}) by the addition of the Rocky River freehold and leases south of Rocky River to the landing reserve by the Cape du Couedic lighthouse. The Chase's eastern boundary was now a straight line running south from the De Mole River mouth to the island's south coast. It also gave the board a couple of cottages for the use of a ranger and visitors.

It was constituted as a national park upon the proclamation of the National Parks and Wildlife Act 1972 on 27 April 1972 which repealed five items of existing legislation including the Fauna and Flora Reserve Act 1919. At proclamation in 1972, it consisted of the following land in the following cadastral units as well as the entirety of the Casuarina Islets - section 11 in the Hundred of Borda, section 64 in the Hundred of Gosse, section 17 in the Hundred of McDonald and section 66 in "South out of Hundreds".

On 15 October 1993, land in section 11 of the Hundred of Borda, section 64 of Hundred of Gosse and Allotments 50 and 52 in DP 38340 and with an area of 416.63 square kilometres (160.86 sq mi) was removed from the national park and constituted under the Wilderness Protection Act 1992 as the Ravine des Casoars Wilderness Protection Area.

== Sanctuary ==
Since creation in November 1919, it has become a sanctuary for endangered species, some of them introduced from the mainland in the 1920s and 1930s. During the 1940s, 23 additional species were introduced, including koalas (1923) and platypus (1928). Most of these species can still be observed today. Kangaroos, goannas and echidnas are commonly seen in the national park.

=== Little penguins ===
Little penguins have been recorded in Flinders Chase in the 1920s, 1930s, 1940s, and 1950s. It is believed that these colonies have since gone extinct, partly due to the increase of long-nosed fur seal populations after the end of commercial sealing. In 1886, little penguins were seen at Admiral's Arch.

== Geological monuments ==
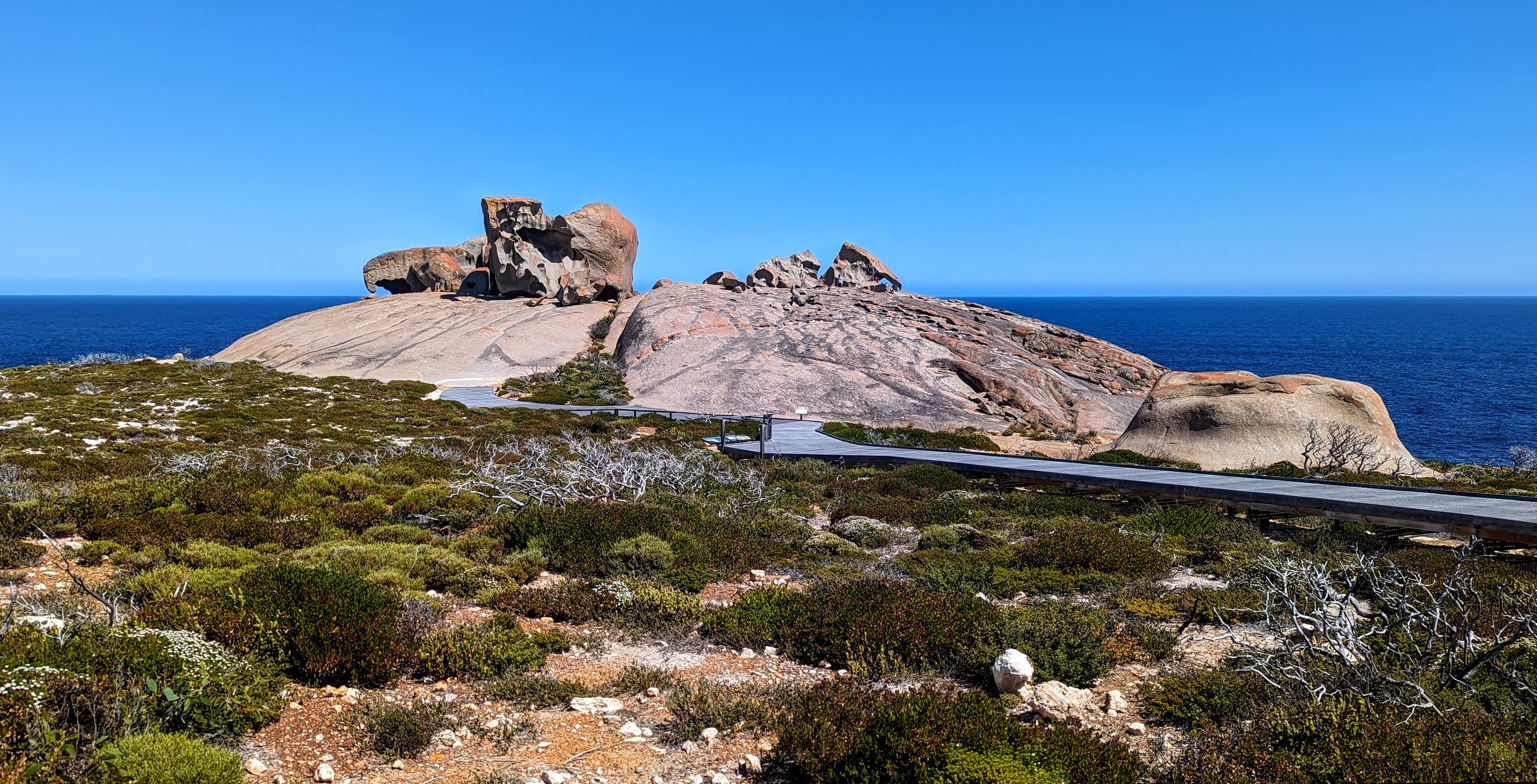
The Remarkable Rocks granite dome. The boardwalk was built after the 2020 fires.

The national park contains two geological features that have been listed as geological monuments by the Geological Society of Australia: Cape du Couedic and Remarkable Rocks.

Remarkable Rocks are naturally sculptured formations precariously balanced atop a granite outcrop. They remind visitors of the sculptures of Henry Moore.

== Fire ==
Lightning strikes on Thursday 6 December 2007 caused approximately 60,000 hectares (150,000 acres) of land in both the national park and the adjoining Ravine des Casoars Wilderness Protection Area to be burnt, before being brought under control ten days later. The national park was again damaged during the 2019–20 Australian bushfire season, with the Visitor Centre completely destroyed.

== Gallery ==
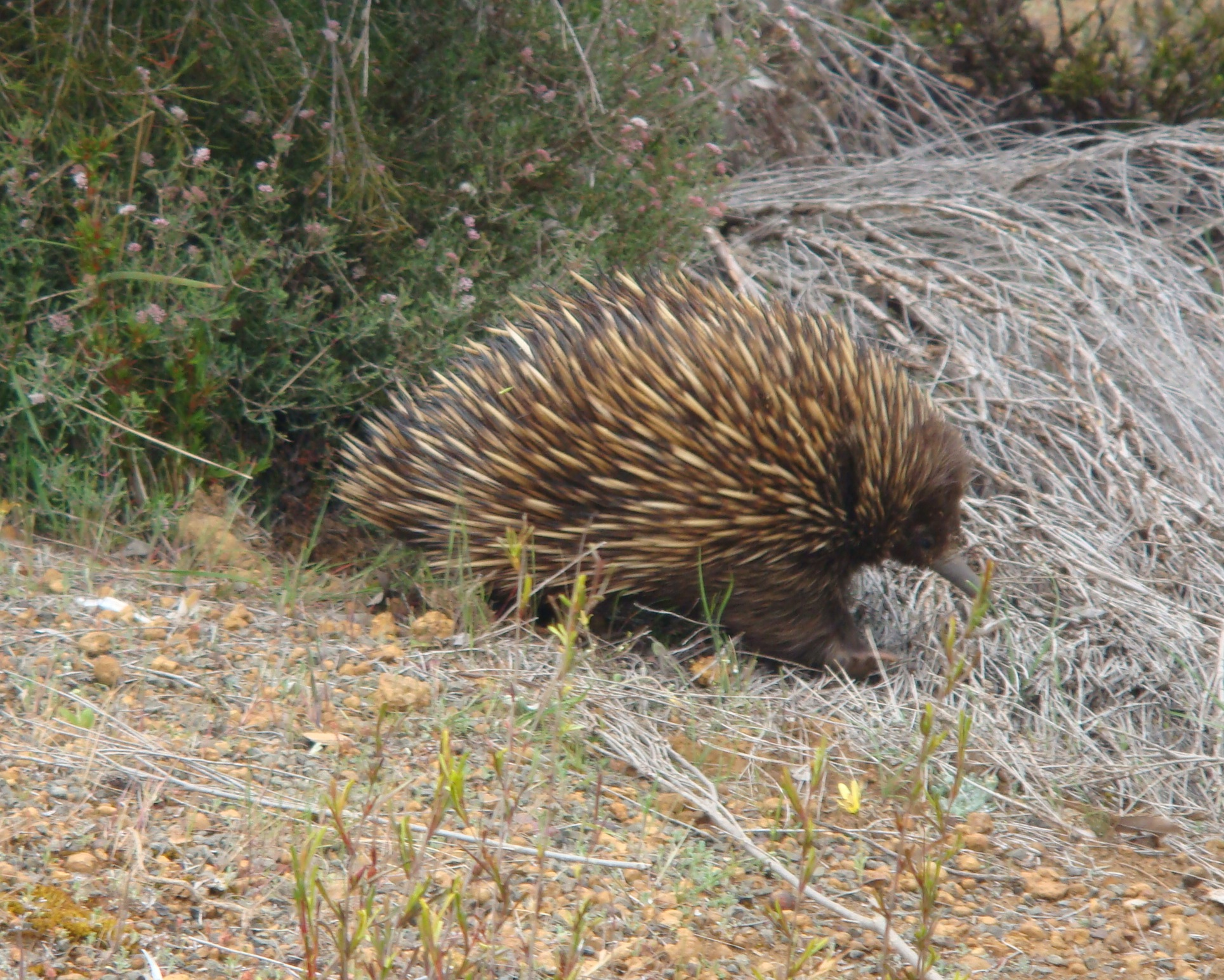
An echidna at Flinders Chase National Park

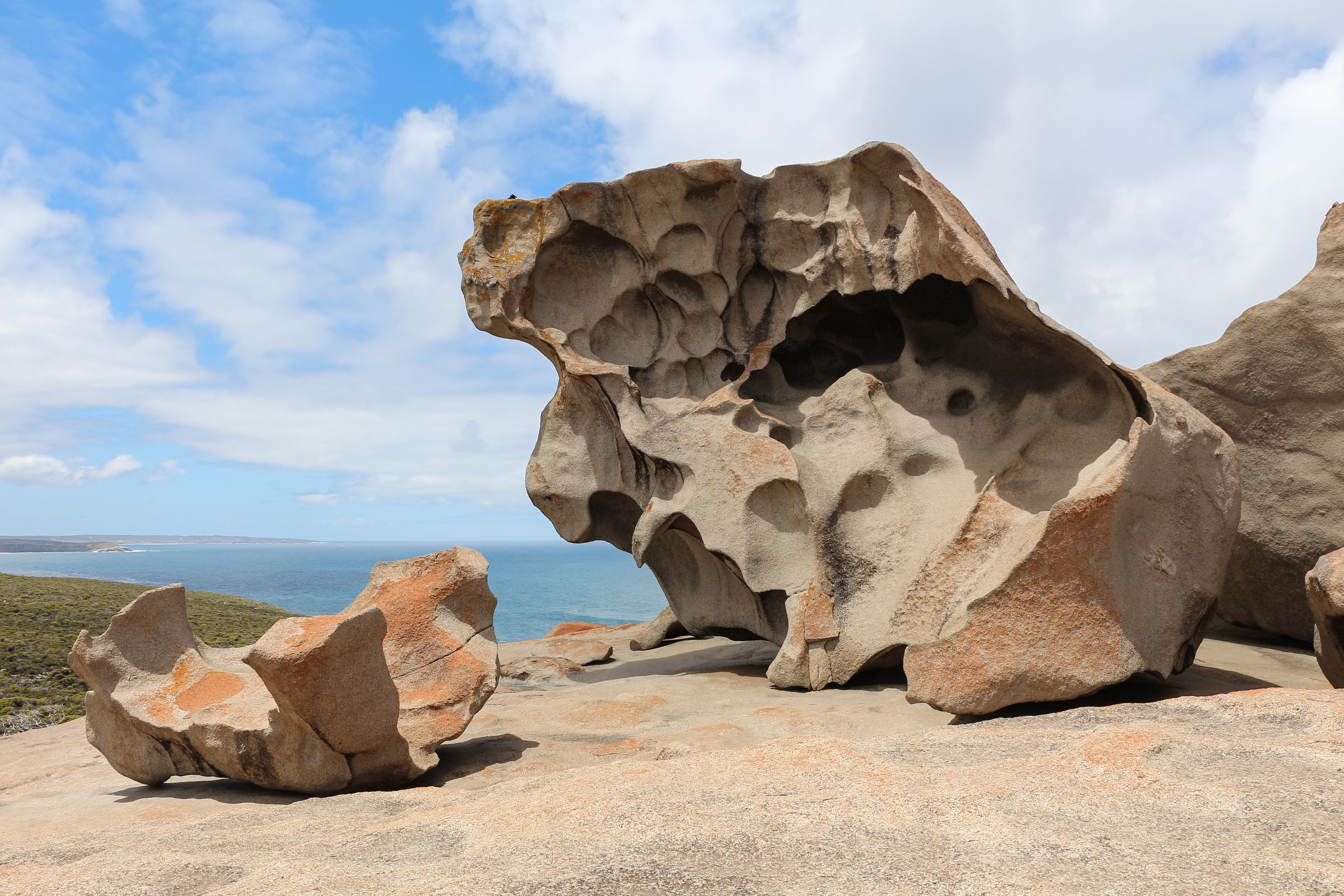
Remarkable Rocks

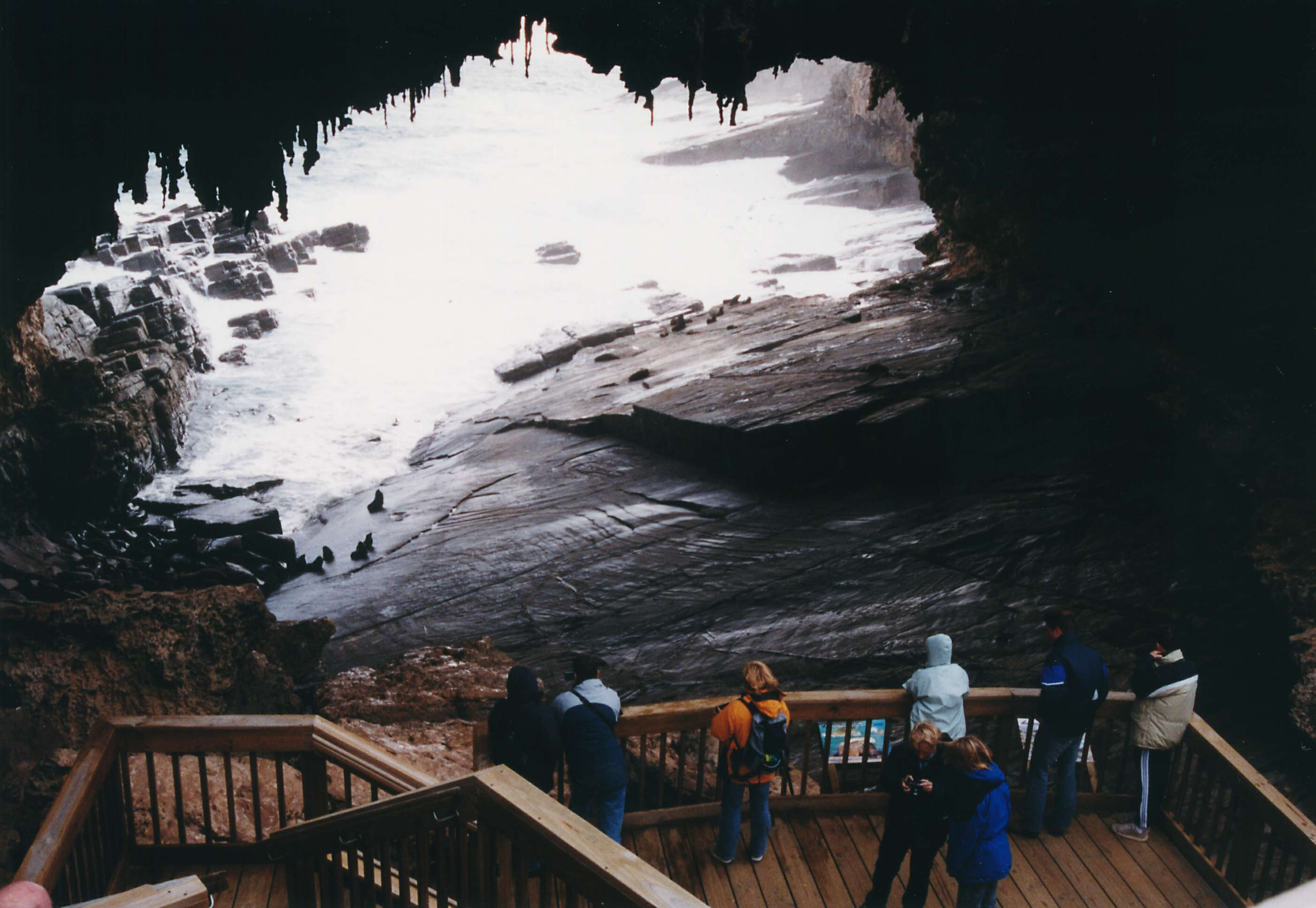
Admirals Arch

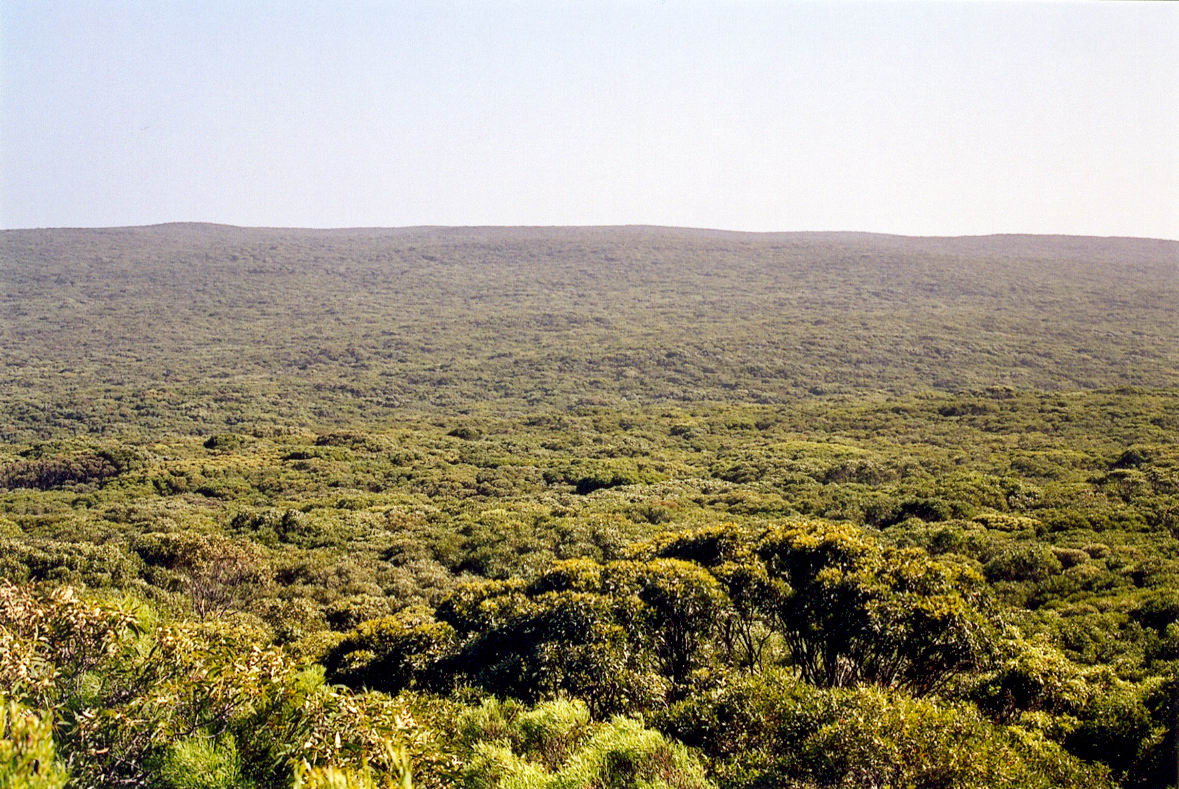
View from Bunker Hill lookout

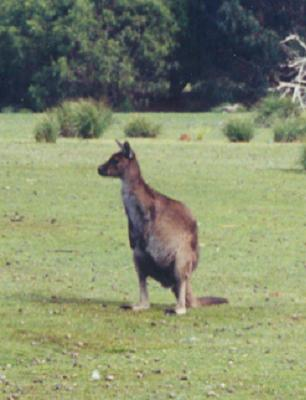
Western grey kangaroo

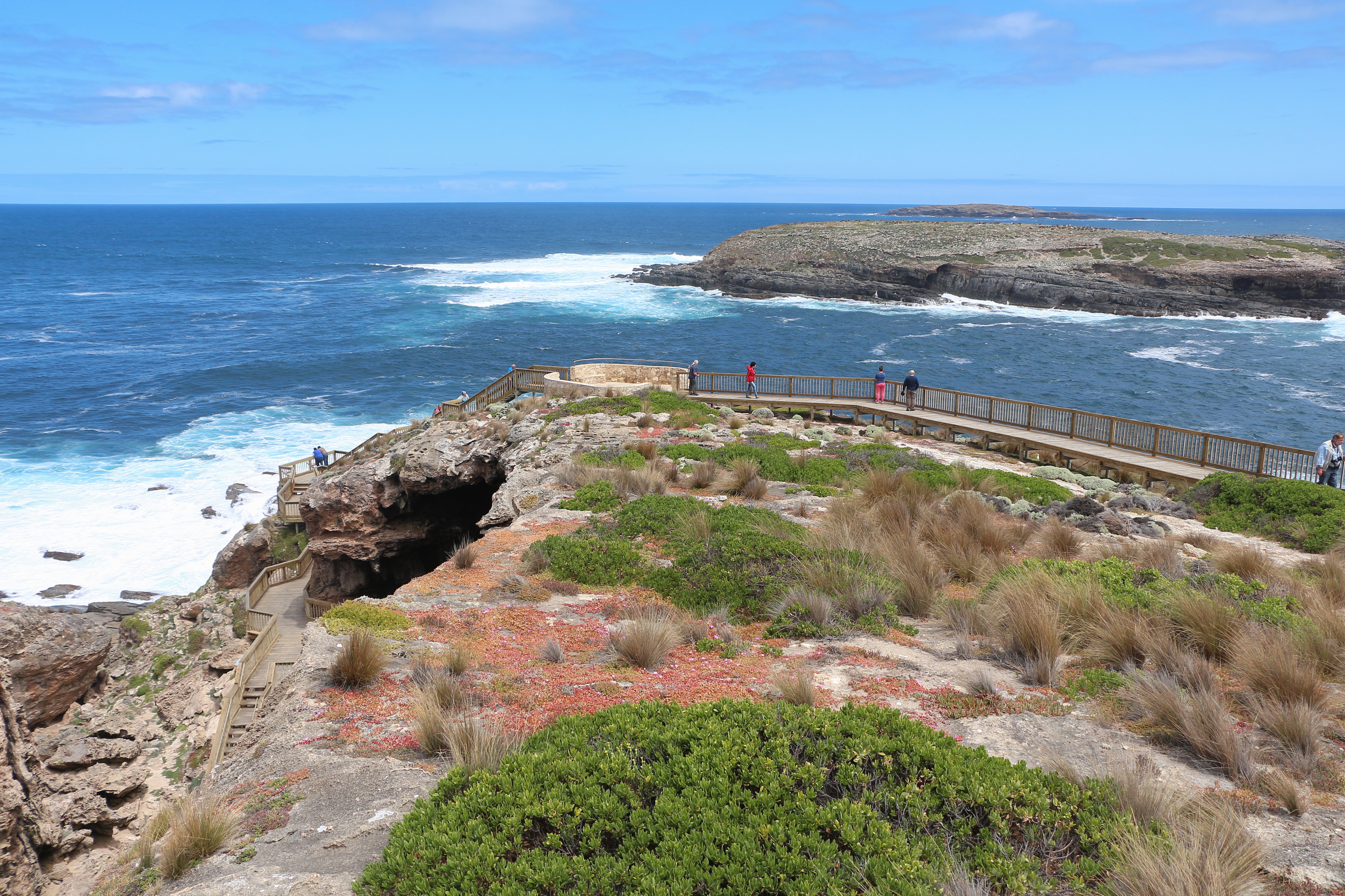
Cape de Couedic

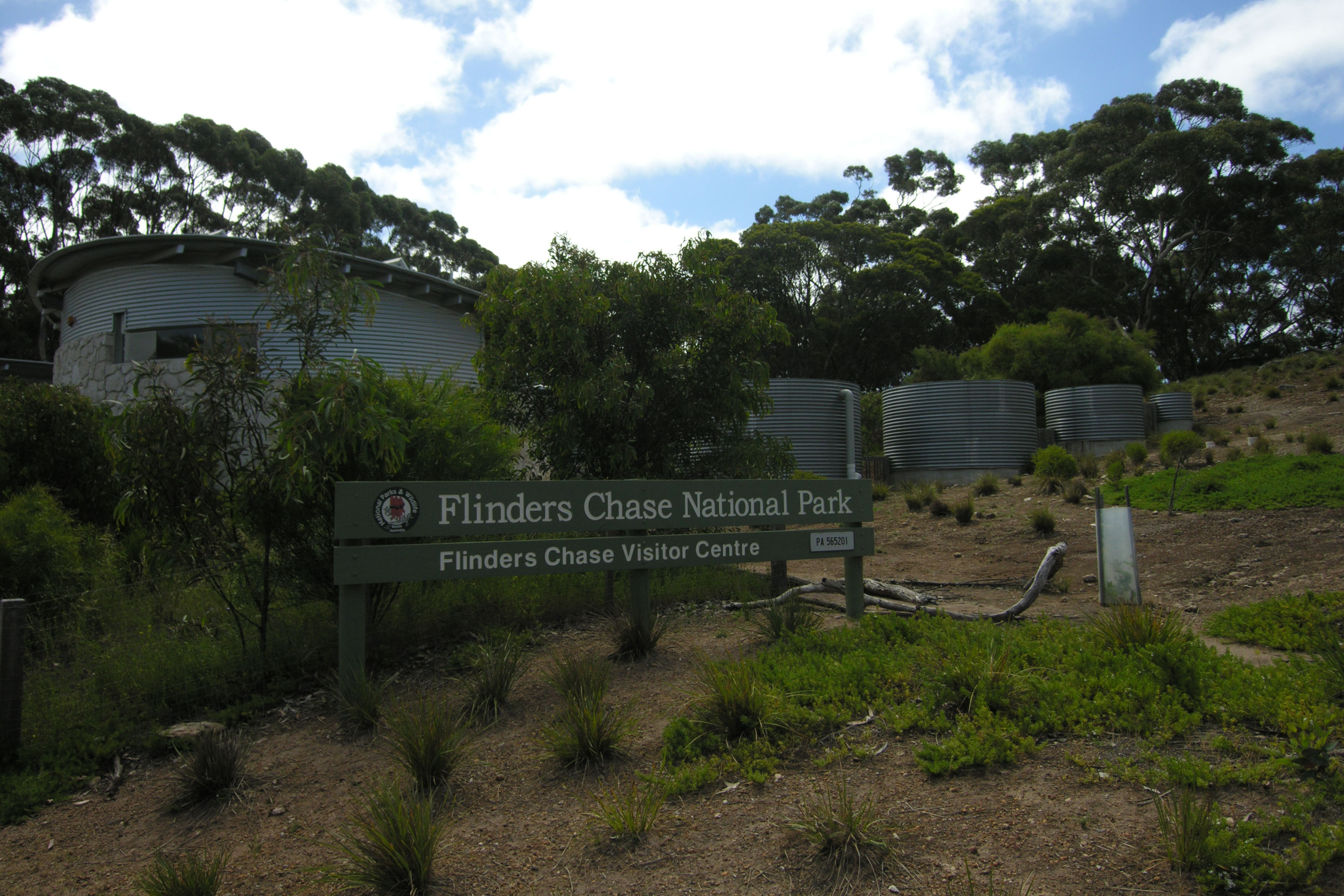
Flinders Chase Visitor Centre

== See also ==
- Protected areas of South Australia
- Loch Vennachar
- 2007 Kangaroo Island bushfires
- Rocky River (Kangaroo Island)
- Field Naturalists Society of South Australia
