= 2007 Kangaroo Island bushfires =

Bushfires in South Australia

Kangaroo Island bushfires
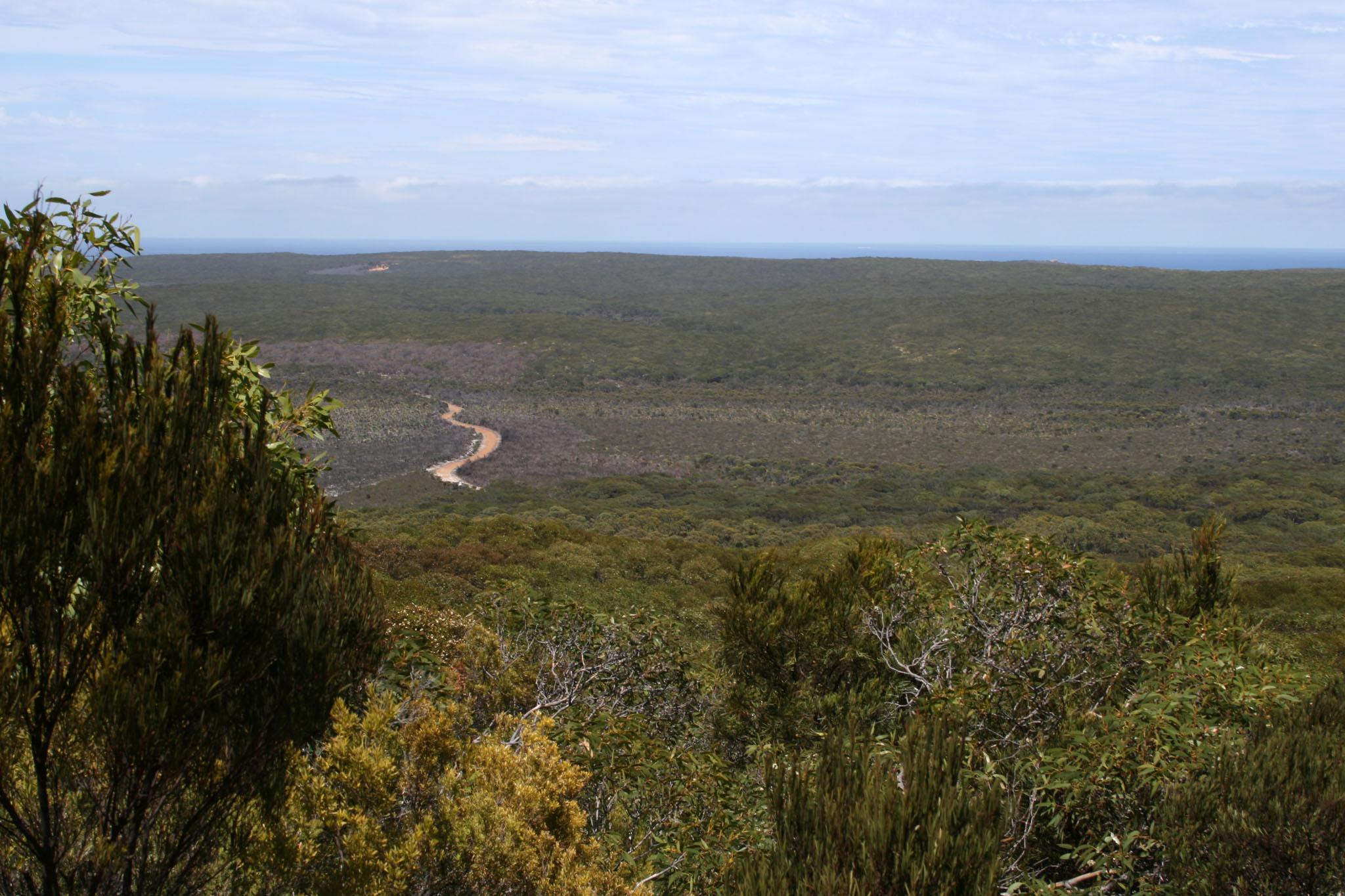
- A significant proportion of Flinders Chase National Park was burnt in this bushfire event
- Date: 6 December 2007 – 14 December 2007
- Location: Kangaroo Island, South Australia, Australia
- Coordinates: 35°58′S 136°40′E

Statistics
- Burned area: 95,000 hectares (230,000 acres)
- Land use: National Park and wilderness protection area

Impacts
- Deaths: 1
- Cost: A$2.3 million

Ignition
- Cause: Lightning, strong winds

Map
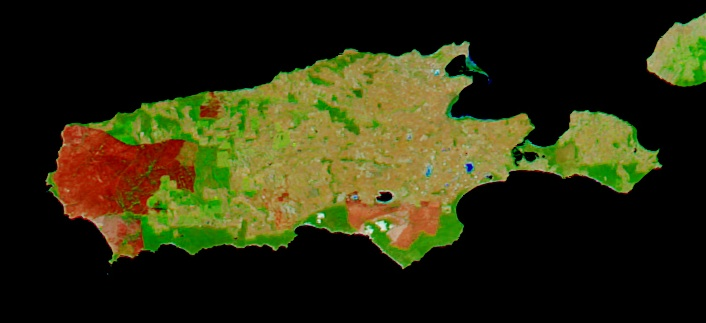
- Burn scars show red in this false-colour satellite image of Kangaroo Island, South Australia taken by NASA in December 2007

The 2007 Kangaroo Island bushfires were a series of bushfires caused by lightning strikes on 6 December 2007 on Kangaroo Island, South Australia, resulting in the destruction of 95,000 hectares (230,000 acres) of national park and wilderness protection area. The fires occurred mainly across the western side of the island near Flinders Chase National Park, Vivonne Bay, D'Estrees Bay, Western River and Riverleas.

== Overview ==
The D'Estrees Bay fire in Cape Gantheaume Conservation Park was contained by 12 December 2007, while intense fires in the west, which included the protected areas of Flinders Chase National Park and Ravine des Casoars Wilderness Protection Area, were more difficult to extinguish.

On 14 December 2007, the Country Fire Service officially announced that all fires were contained. The event was South Australia's largest bush fire operation to date with over 800 personnel, 7 fixed wing water bombers and an Elvis Skycrane Helitanker all assisting in firefighting efforts, together with units from Victoria's Country Fire Authority and the New South Wales Rural Fire Service.

A state of emergency was considered but was rejected on 10 December 2007 due to cooler conditions. A state of emergency would have seen the Australian Army move in to assist the Country Fire Service and Department of Environment personnel.

Before being contained on 16 December 2007, over 900 square kilometres (220,000 acres) (or 20% of the Island) had been burnt, principally within National Park and Conservation Reserves. The most serious outbreak occurred in Flinders Chase, with 630 square kilometres (160,000 acres) (or 85% of the total Park area) having been burnt. The total damage bill is estimated at A$2.3 million.
