= Casuarina Islets =

Islands in South Australia

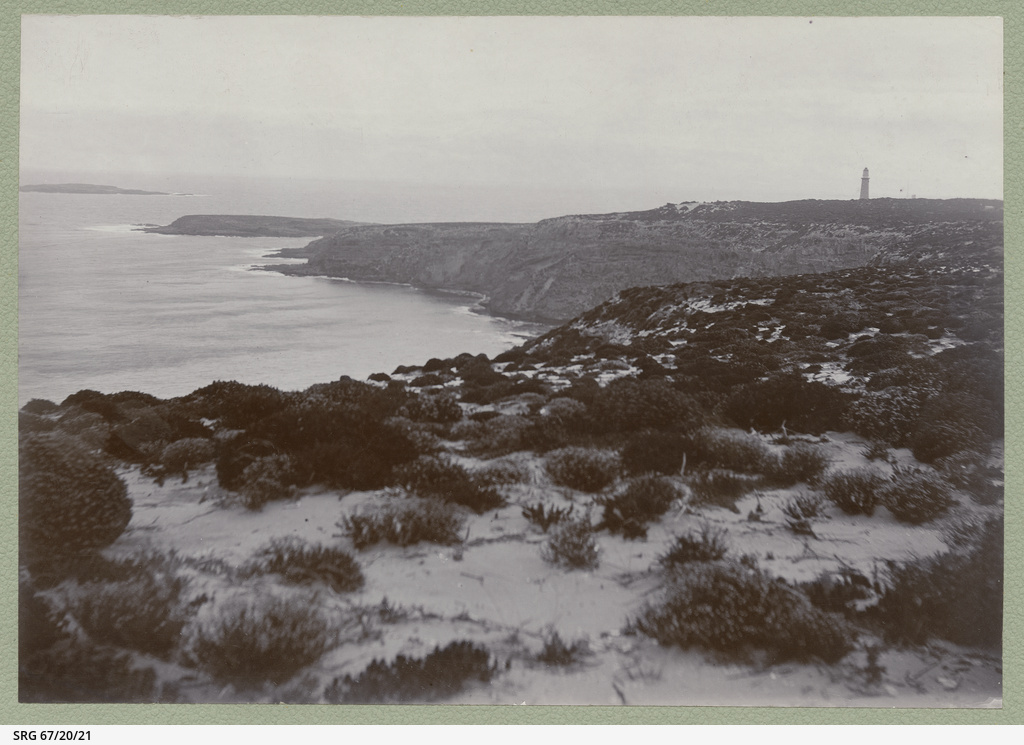
- Cape Du Couedic and the two Casuarina Islands, circa 1912 (State Library of South Australia, SRG-67-20-21)

- Location within South Australia

Geography
- Location: Great Australian Bight
- Coordinates: 36°04′01″S 136°42′08″E
- Area: 4 ha (9.9 acres)

Administration
- Australia

The Casuarina Islets (French: Ilots du Cassuarina), also known as The Brothers, is a pair of islands located in the Great Australian Bight immediately off the south-west coast of Kangaroo Island in South Australia approximately 96 kilometres (60 miles) south-west of Kingscote. The pair is currently part of the Flinders Chase National Park.

== Location and features ==
Casuarina Islets are located approximately 96 kilometres (60 miles) south-west of Kingscote. The North Islet and the South Islet lay respectively 370 metres (1,210 feet) and 2.3 kilometres (1.4 miles) south of Cape du Couedic. The North Islet covers an area of about 2 hectares (4.9 acres) and reaches an elevation of 29 metres (95 feet). The South Islet covers an area of about 2 hectares (4.9 acres) and reaches an elevation of 35 metres (115 feet).

The Casuarina Islets were formed between 7500 and 8900 years ago after sea levels rose at the start of the Holocene. Both islets are humps of Kanmantoo group metasandstone that have been rounded by wave action. A remnant cap of calcarenite still exists over the eastern half of the North Islet while the South Islet has lost its calcarenite cap due to wave action. The North Islet is located in waters of 30 metres (98 feet) depth while the South Islet located in waters of 40 metres (130 feet) depth.

=== Economic activity ===
The Casuarina Islets is one of the island sites from which guano was mined under licence from the South Australian Government prior to 1919.

== Flora and fauna ==
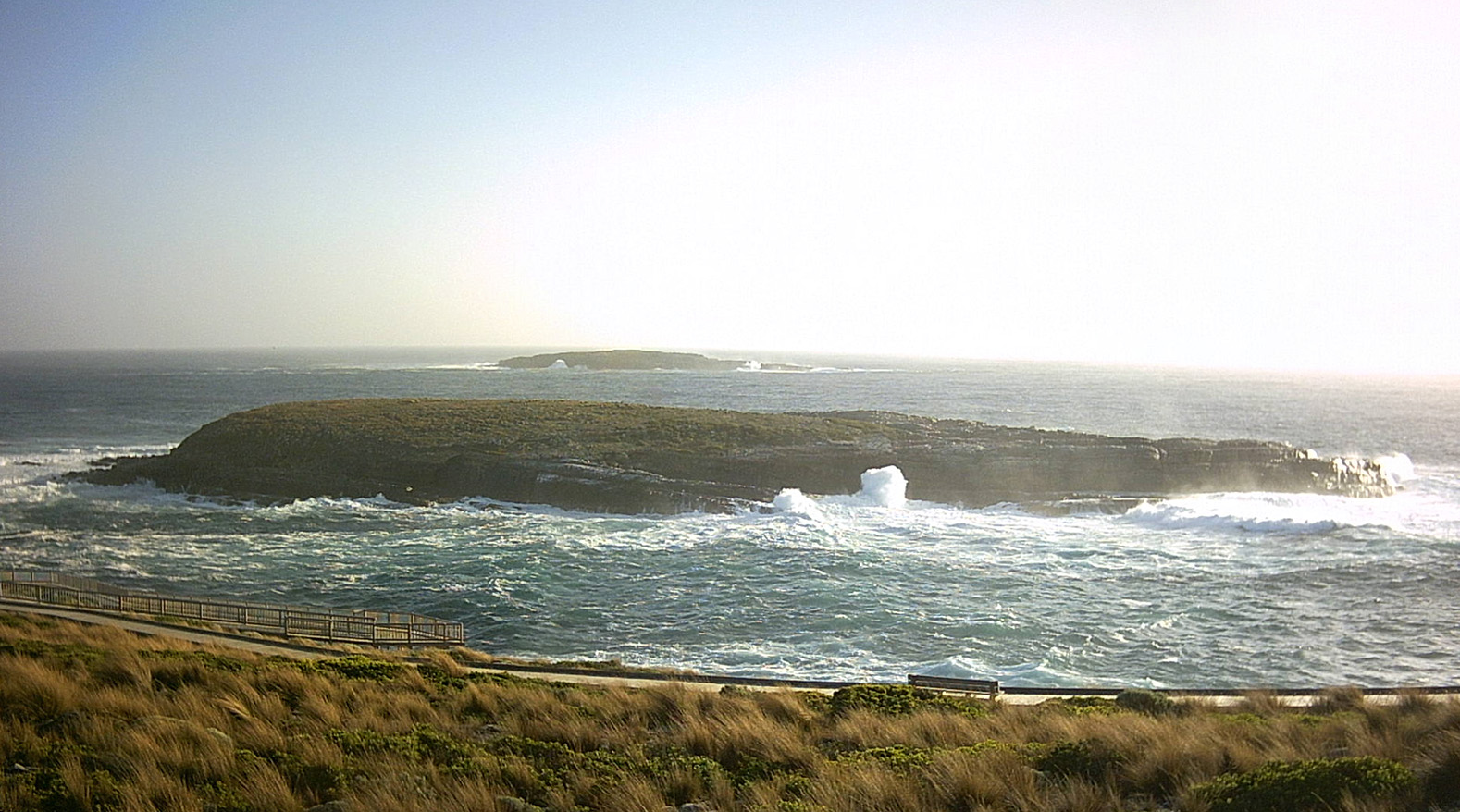
The islets in 2009

=== North Islet ===
A survey in 1996 found nine species of plant to be present with roundleaved pigface, sea celery, beaded samphire and bower spinach occupying the exposed areas of the islet while the more sheltered areas were occupied by nitre-bush, ruby saltbush, variable groundsel and feather spear-grass. Vertebrate animals were represented by mammals, birds and reptiles. The islet supports a breeding colony of New Zealand fur seals while serving as a haul out for Australian sea lions. Breeding colonies of silver gulls, Pacific gulls and crested terns are observed along with specimens of rock parrots, welcome swallows and Australian pipit. The only reptile found was a single specimen of the marbled gecko.

=== South Islet ===
As of 1996, four species of plant were found to be present – round-leaved pigface which was the dominant species, sea celery, ruby saltbush and austral seablite. Vertebrate animals were represented by mammals, birds and reptiles. A non-breeding colony of New Zealand fur seals are the main occupants of the islet while birds were represented by turnstones, sooty oystercatchers and welcome swallows. The only reptile found was a single specimen of the four-toed earless skink.

== History ==
The Casuarina Islets (Ilots du Cassuarina) were named by Nicolas Baudin on 3 January 1803 after one of the ships in his expedition, Casuarina which was under the command of Louis de Freycinet at the time. The islets are also known as The Brothers.

== Protected area status ==
The South Islet was declared a closed area in 1909 in respect to birds and animals under the Birds Protection Act 1900 following lobbying by the South Australian Ornithological Association which was concerned about the ongoing survival of one of the few remaining colonies of New Zealand fur seals on Kangaroo Island. North Islet was declared a sanctuary in September 1955 to protect the fur seal population ‘from shooting parties from the mainland’. Both islets were declared as fauna reserves under the Fauna Conservation Act 1964 and as a fauna conservation reserve under the Crown Lands Act 1929-1966 on 16 March 1967. Both Islets were proclaimed as part of the Flinders Chase National Park in 1972 and have since been specifically proclaimed as prohibited areas in order to protect breeding fur seals and seabirds. As of December 2012, the waters around both islets are part of a restricted access zone located within the boundaries of the Western Kangaroo Island Marine Park.
