= Flinders Chase, South Australia =

Flinders Chase
- Town
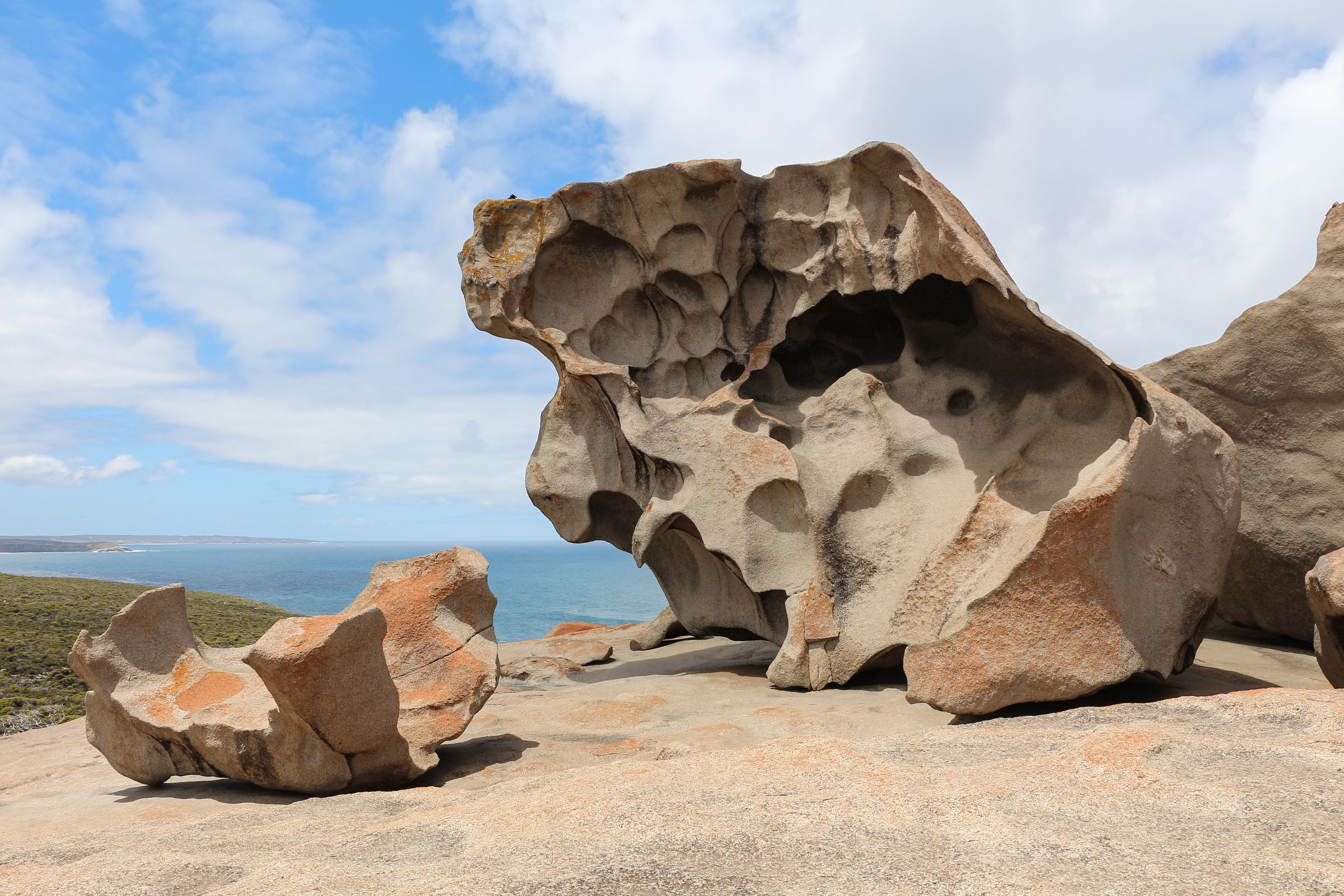
- Remarkable Rocks
- Interactive map of Flinders Chase
- Coordinates: 35°45′10″S 136°35′36″E
- Country: Australia
- State: South Australia
- Region: Fleurieu and Kangaroo Island
- LGA: Kangaroo Island Council
- Location: 192 km (119 mi) south-west of Adelaide city centre
- Established: 2002

Government
  - State electorate: Mawson
  - Federal division: Mayo

Population
  - Total: 0 (SAL 2016)
- Time zone: UTC+9:30 (ACST)
  - Summer (DST): UTC+10:30 (ACST)
- Postcode: 5223
- County: Carnarvon
- Mean max temp: 22.1 °C (71.8 °F)
- Mean min temp: 11.5 °C (52.7 °F)
- Annual rainfall: 534.0 mm (21.02 in)
Localities around Flinders Chase
Ocean	Cape Borda; Gosse	Gosse
Ocean	Flinders Chase	Gosse; Karatta
Ocean	Ocean	Ocean
- Distances; Coordinates; Climate; Adjoining localities

Flinders Chase is a locality in the Australian state of South Australia located in south-western Kangaroo Island overlooking the body of water known in Australia as the Southern Ocean and by international authorities as the Great Australian Bight. It is located about 210 kilometres (130 miles) south-west of the state capital of Adelaide.

Its boundaries were created in 2002 in respect to “the long established name” which is reported to be derived from the Flinders Chase National Park. Its northern boundary is formed by the Playford Highway while its eastern boundary is formed by the West End Highway in the northern and by the Sanderson Fire Access Track in the south.

The principal land use within the locality is conservation with its full extent being occupied by the following protected areas - the southern part of the Flinders Chase National Park in the south and the Ravine des Casoars Wilderness Protection Area in the north.

The locality includes the five following state heritage places - David Kilpatrick's Grave being the burial place of a passenger who survived the loss of the barque, Loch Sloy in 1899 but died after reaching land, the Rocky River Homestead, the Cape du Couedic Lighthouse, the Cape du Couedic Lighthouse Keepers' Cottages, Stable and Store, and the Weirs Cove Jetty, Funnelway and Store Ruin.

Flinders Chase is located within the federal division of Mayo, the state electoral district of Mawson and the local government area of the Kangaroo Island Council.
