= Cape Borda =

Cape Borda South Australia
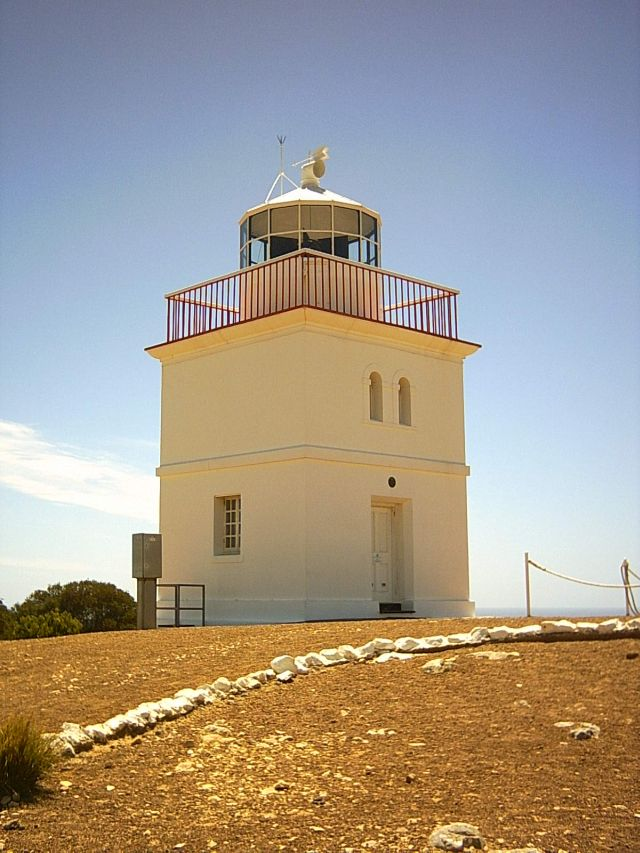
- Cape Borda Lighthouse

- Coordinates: 35°44′57.2274″S 136°35′15.612″E
- Elevation: 61 m (200 ft)
- Location: 70 km (43 mi) west of Kingscote

Cape Borda is a headland in the Australian state of South Australia located in the gazetted locality of Cape Borda on the north west tip of Kangaroo Island about 70 km (43 mi) west of the municipal seat of Kingscote. It was named after Jean-Charles de Borda (1733–1799), the French mathematician, physicist, naturalist and sailor, by the Baudin expedition to Australia during January 1803. It has been the site of an operating lighthouse since 1858 and is currently located within the Flinders Chase National Park.

== Description ==
Cape Borda is located in the gazetted locality of Cape Borda about 70 kilometres (43 miles) west of Kingscote. It is the most north westerly point of the Kangaroo Island coast. It is the termination for a pair of coastlines – the western coastline extending from Cape du Couedic in the south and the northern coastline extending from Point Marsden in the east. It is described as ‘a bold cliffy headland, 61 metres (200 feet) high’ with ‘the upper half of the cliff is formed of white limestone, and the lower half is very dark volcanic rock’ and that ‘the hills at the cape rise to a height of more than 152 metres (499 feet) and are covered with small scrub.’

== Formation, geology & oceanography ==
Cape Borda was formed when the sea reached its present level 7,500 years ago after sea levels started to rise at the start of the Holocene. The cliff line which includes Cape Borda consists of base strata of a metasandstone belonging to the Kanmantoo group bedrock such as Middleton Sandstone and Balquhidder Formation, overlaid by a relatively thick capping of Bridgewater Formation calcarenite rock. The water adjoining the cliff face at Cape Borda drops to depths ranging between 20 metres (66 feet) to 30 metres (98 feet).

== History ==
=== Aboriginal use ===
By 1999, the literature had not cited any archaeological discoveries specific to Aboriginal use of land in the immediate vicinity of Cape Borda.

=== European discovery ===
Cape Borda was named in January 1803 by the Baudin expedition of 1800-03 in the memory of Jean-Charles de Borda (1733–1799), the French mathematician, physicist, naturalist and sailor.

== Navigation aid ==
The lighthouse at Cape Borda was the third of three provided for by legislation; the others being erected at Cape Willoughby and Troubridge Shoals (now called Troubridge Island). The light was officially lit on 13 July 1858 and was named the ‘Flinders Light’ in August 1858 in memory of Matthew Flinders.

== Fauna ==
The coast near the Cape Borda lighthouse previously supported colonies of little penguins which are now believed to be extinct. Causes for local extinction are likely to include (but not be limited to) predation by increasing New Zealand fur seal populations and changes in prey availability.

== Protected area status ==
Cape Borda is currently located within the protected area known as the Flinders Chase National Park. As of 2012, the waters surrounding its shores are part of a sanctuary zone located within the boundaries of the Western Kangaroo Island Marine Park.

== Climate ==
Climate data for Cape Borda (143m ASL)
Month	Jan	Feb	Mar	Apr	May	Jun	Jul	Aug	Sep	Oct	Nov	Dec	Year
Record high °C (°F)	39.0 (102.2)	37.9 (100.2)	34.0 (93.2)	29.2 (84.6)	24.8 (76.6)	20.4 (68.7)	20.0 (68.0)	22.0 (71.6)	26.5 (79.7)	32.6 (90.7)	34.4 (93.9)	37.0 (98.6)	39.0 (102.2)
Mean daily maximum °C (°F)	23.0 (73.4)	23.3 (73.9)	21.3 (70.3)	18.7 (65.7)	16.4 (61.5)	14.6 (58.3)	13.9 (57.0)	14.0 (57.2)	15.1 (59.2)	16.9 (62.4)	19.4 (66.9)	21.2 (70.2)	18.2 (64.8)
Daily mean °C (°F)	18.4 (65.1)	18.8 (65.8)	17.5 (63.5)	15.6 (60.1)	13.8 (56.8)	12.2 (54.0)	11.5 (52.7)	11.5 (52.7)	12.2 (54.0)	13.5 (56.3)	15.3 (59.5)	16.9 (62.4)	14.8 (58.6)
Mean daily minimum °C (°F)	13.8 (56.8)	14.3 (57.7)	13.6 (56.5)	12.4 (54.3)	11.2 (52.2)	9.8 (49.6)	9.1 (48.4)	8.9 (48.0)	9.3 (48.7)	10.0 (50.0)	11.2 (52.2)	12.5 (54.5)	11.3 (52.3)
Record low °C (°F)	6.1 (43.0)	8.0 (46.4)	7.2 (45.0)	6.7 (44.1)	3.3 (37.9)	1.8 (35.2)	2.2 (36.0)	2.2 (36.0)	2.8 (37.0)	3.3 (37.9)	4.1 (39.4)	6.0 (42.8)	1.8 (35.2)
Average rainfall mm (inches)	15.4 (0.61)	16.9 (0.67)	23.7 (0.93)	45.2 (1.78)	79.0 (3.11)	106.4 (4.19)	104.2 (4.10)	86.5 (3.41)	55.3 (2.18)	41.7 (1.64)	26.1 (1.03)	21.0 (0.83)	625.9 (24.64)
Average rainy days	5.4	5.0	7.5	11.9	17.1	19.6	21.2	19.8	16.0	12.8	8.7	7.5	152.5
Average relative humidity (%) (at 3pm)	54	55	59	65	71	73	74	72	70	65	59	58	64

== See also ==
- Loch Sloy
