= De Mole River, South Australia =

De Mole River
- Coordinates: 35.728980°S 136.804650°E
- Country: Australia
- State: South Australia
- Region: Fleurieu and Kangaroo Island
- LGA: Kangaroo Island Council
- Location: 186 km (116 mi) south-west of Adelaide
- Established: 2002

Government
  - State electorate: Mawson
  - Federal division: Mayo

Population
  - Total: 3 (SAL 2021)
- Time zone: UTC+9:30 (ACST)
  - Summer (DST): UTC+10:30 (ACST)
- Postcode: 5223
- County: Carnarvon
- Mean max temp: 22.1 °C (71.8 °F)
- Mean min temp: 11.5 °C (52.7 °F)
- Annual rainfall: 534.0 mm (21.02 in)
Localities around De Mole River
	Investigator Strait
Cape Borda	De Mole River	Western River; Gosse
Cape Borda	Gosse	Gosse
- Distances; Coordinates; Climate; Adjoining localities

De Mole River is a locality in the Australian state of South Australia located on the north coast of Kangaroo Island overlooking Investigator Strait about 175 kilometres (109 miles) south-west of the state capital of Adelaide.

The locality's boundaries were created in May 2002 for the "long established name" which is reported to be derived from the stream located within its boundaries. The name is of unknown origin, but was established by 1855, several years before the survey by Captain Douglas and George de Mole. Nevertheless Rodney Cockburn asserts that it has a "similar derivation" to Point De Mole, Streaky Bay, named by Captain Douglas in 1858.

The principal land use within the locality is conservation and some agriculture, with uncleared land and land adjoining the coastline having additional statutory constraints to 'conserve natural flora and fauna' and "conserve the natural features of the coast".

De Mole River is located within the federal division of Mayo, the state electoral district of Mawson and the local government area of the Kangaroo Island Council.
