= Loch Sloy =

Scottish barque wrecked in South Australia

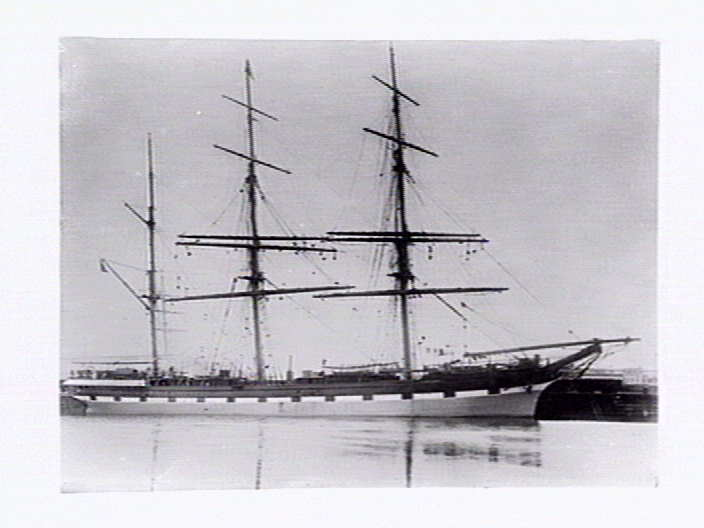
- Loch Sloy

History

United Kingdom
- Name: Loch Sloy
- Owner: Loch Line
- Builder: D. and W. Henderson and Company, Glasgow
- Launched: August 1877
- In service: 1877
- Out of service: 24 April 1899
- Fate: Wrecked 24 April 1899

General characteristics
- Type: Clipper
- Tons burthen: 1,280 tons
- Length: 225 ft 4 in (68.68 m)
- Beam: 35 ft 5 in (10.80 m)
- Depth of hold: 21 ft 2 in (6.45 m)
- Propulsion: Sail
- Sail plan: Barque
- Complement: 26 crew

Loch Sloy was a Scottish sailing barque that operated between Great Britain and Australia from the late 19th century until 1899. Her name was drawn from Loch Sloy, a freshwater loch which lies to the north of the Burgh of Helensburgh, in the region of Argyll and Bute, Scotland. Ships Captains: 1877 - 1885 James Horne, 1885 – 1890 John McLean, 1890 – 1895 Charles Lehman, 1895 – 1896 James R. George, 1896 – 1899 William J. Wade, 1899 Peter Nicol.

In the early hours of 24 April 1899, Loch Sloy overran her distance when trying to pick up the light at Cape Borda and was wrecked on Brothers Rocks, about 300 metres from shore off Maupertuis Bay, Kangaroo Island, South Australia. Of the 34 passengers and crew on board, there were only four survivors, one who died from injuries and exposure shortly afterwards.

== History and description ==
Loch Sloy was built in 1877 by D. and W. Henderson and Company, Glasgow, Yard No 178 for the Glasgow Shipping Company, more commonly known as the Loch Line.

Under the command of Captain Peter Nicol, Loch Sloy was on passage from Glasgow to Adelaide and Melbourne with a load of general cargo and seven passengers, including 2 women; David Kilpatrick, a cook from Glasgow (25), George Lamb, a clerk from Edinburgh, (30), Robert Logan, a piano tuner from Inverness, (40), Alexander McDonald, an engineer from Aberdeen (34), Captain Osmond Leicester (30) and Mrs Leicester (real name Blanche Sophia Meyer-Edmunds, 26, but listed as 30; Osmond's real wife Fermina had been abandoned) of Liverpool, and Rosalind Cartlidge (25). In the early hours of 24 April 1899, she met with disaster on the coast of Kangaroo Island at the mouth of the Investigator Strait, South Australia. The ship overran her distance when trying to pick up the light at Cape Borda. She was too close inshore and the light was hidden by the cliffs between Cape Bedout and Cape Couedie. In the darkness of the morning she ran full on to a reef 300 yards from shore to the north of the Casuarina Islets in Maurpetuis Bay.

The crew and passengers took refuge in the rigging, but one by one the masts broke and went over the side and the men were hurled into the breakers. There was little opportunity for her crew to save themselves. The ship had struck well off shore and only four men reached it - a passenger, two able seamen and an apprentice. None of the survivors remembered how they actually got ashore; they heard the crash of the masts, and then felt the wreckage bumping them about in the surf.

== Crew of the final voyage ==
Ship's Officers

- Captain: Peter Nicol, 38, Peterhead, Aberdeenshire.
- First Officer: John MacMillan, 25, Fortrose, Inverness-shire.
- Second Officer: Geoffrey J. Twidale, 24, Glentham, Lincoln, England.
- Third Officer: Thomas Allan Cleland, 21, Blythswood, Glasgow, Lanarkshire.

Ship's Specialists

- Carpenter: Hugh McBride 25, Greenock, Renfrewshire.
- Sailmaker: Robert Birnie, 22, Amoy, China.
- Chief Steward: William M. Hardinge, 48, Gloucestershire, England.
- Second Steward: John A. Browne, 26, Liverpool.
- Cook: John Chisholm, 34, Inverness.

Five Apprentices

- William ‘Willie’ John Simpson 19, Aberdeen, Aberdeenshire.
- George W. Youden, 19, Dover, Kent, England.
- Thomas H. Leach, 18, Hull, Yorkshire, England.
- Robert Milligan, 16, Portobello, Midlothian.
- Frederick William Lyons, 20, Baymount, Sligo.

Able Seamen

- Peter Cleland AB, 24, Bothwell, Lanarkshire.
- John Buchanan AB, 35, Uig, Ross-shire.
- John Finlayson AB, 29, Inverness.
- Johan ‘John’ Olsson AB, 35, Gothenburg, Sweden.
- Paul Blasznowski AB, 38, Danzic, Westpreußen, Germany.
- John Terry AB, 38, Ramsgate, Kent, England.
- William Mitchell AB, 47, Caldewgate, Carlisle.
- Duncan McMillan AB, 22, Dundee, Forfar.
- George Caclard AB, 38, Rouen, France.
- Bernard Sterne AB, 25, Poland, Germany.

Ordinary Seamen

- Archibald 'Archie' Martin OS, 19, Govan, Lanarkshire.
- Robert John Haddow Smith OS, 27, Haddington, East Lothian.
- William ‘Paddy’ Cummings OS ‘Deckboy’, Ireland.

== See also ==
- List of shipwrecks of Australia
