= Cape Borda Lighthouse =

Lighthouse in South Australia

Cape Borda Lightstation
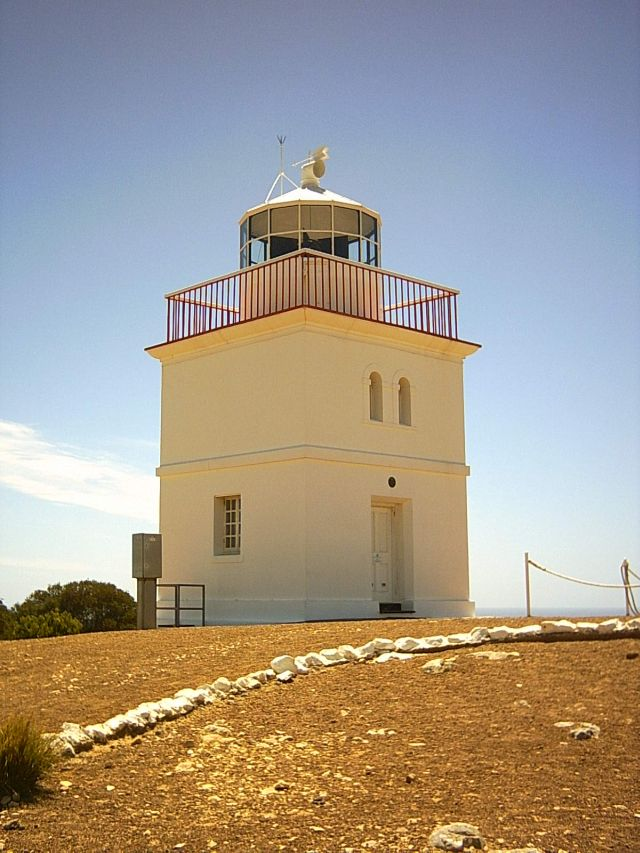
- Location: Kangaroo Island; South Australia; Australia
- Coordinates: 35°45′09.9″S 136°35′35.7″E

Tower
- Construction: stone tower
- Automated: 1989
- Height: 10 metres (33 ft)
- Shape: square tower with balcony and lantern
- Markings: white tower and lantern, red balcony rail
- Power source: mains electricity
- Operator: Australian Maritime Safety Authority
- Heritage: state heritage place since 24 July 1980

Light
- First lit: 1858
- Focal height: 155 metres (509 ft)
- Intensity: 170,000 cd
- Range: 21 nautical miles (39 km)
- Characteristic: Fl (4) 20s.

Cape Borda Lighthouse (formerly known as the Flinders Light) is a lighthouse in the Australian state of South Australia located at Cape Borda on Kangaroo Island.

== History ==
It was built in 1858 and is the third oldest remaining and only square stone lighthouse in South Australia. The lighthouse was built to guide ships travelling along the Roaring Forties trade route heading into the Investigator Strait towards Port Adelaide. Originally there was no road linking Cape Borda to the rest of Kangaroo Island and all supplies had to be hauled up from ships via a steep steel railway at a nearby cove known as Harvey's Return then taken to the lighthouse every three months.

Its focal plane is situated at a height of 155 metres (509 ft), the light characteristic is a group of four white flashes that occurs every 20 seconds. The lightstation was automated in 1989 and is still fully operational. In 1999 the original fog signal cannon was restored, today it is fired daily at 12:30 hours.

== Today ==
The lighthouse and surrounding cottages are looked after by the Department of Environment and Natural Resources while the top floor of the lightstation and the light itself is the property of the Australian Maritime Safety Authority. Visitors are able to go on tours of the lighthouse and stay in the surrounding cottages.

The lighthouse has been listed as a state heritage place on the South Australian Heritage Register since 24 July 1980. Its significance is reported as follows:

The Cape Borda Lighthouse (1858), originally termed the Flinders Light, was the third lighthouse constructed in the Colony following those at Cape Willoughby (1852) and Troubridge Shoal (1856). It is significant for being one of very few square stone lighthouses remaining in Australia and is the only one in South Australia. In addition, its Deville & Co lantern is one of only three known to remain in Australia.

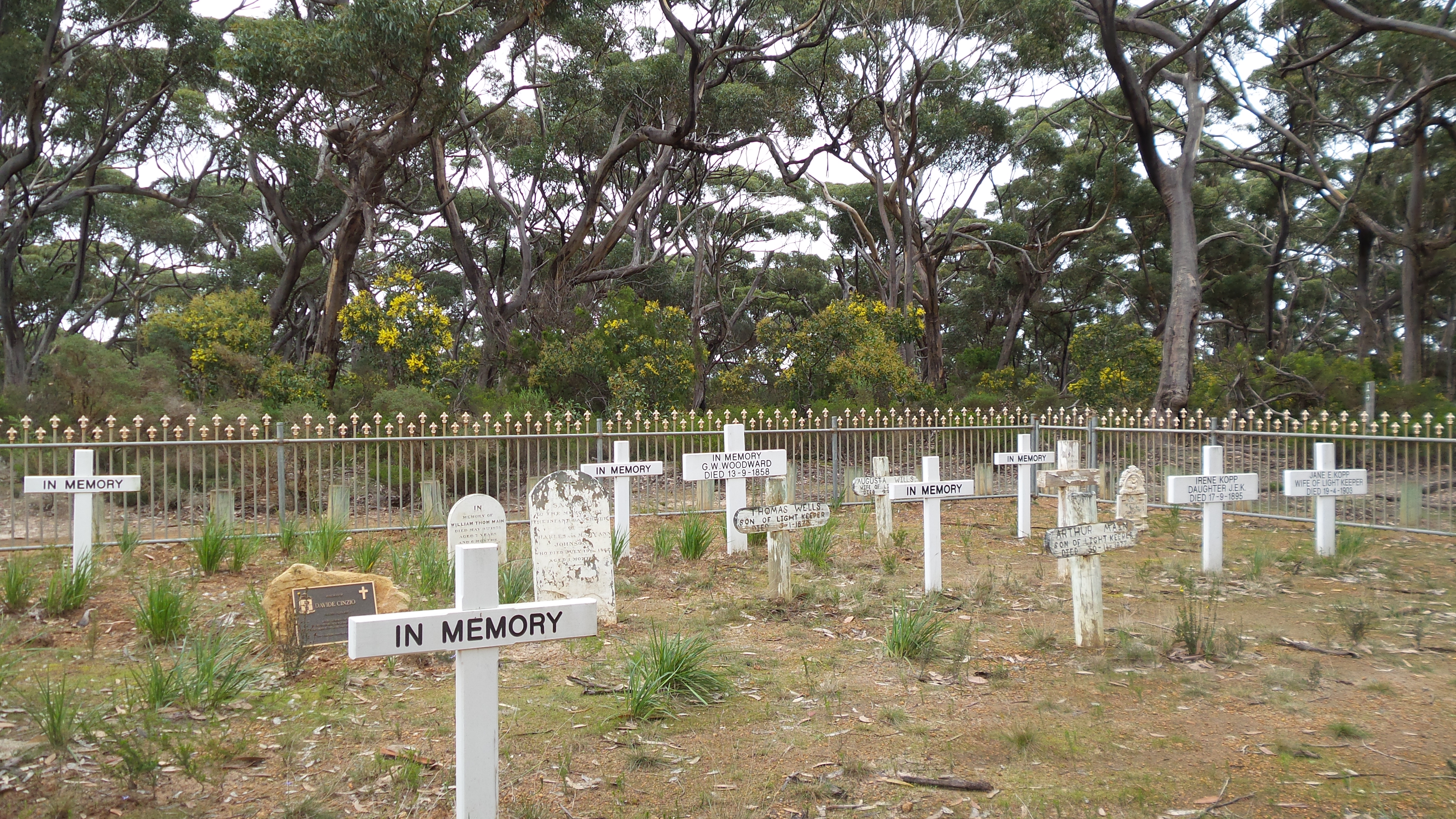
Harvey's Return cemetery

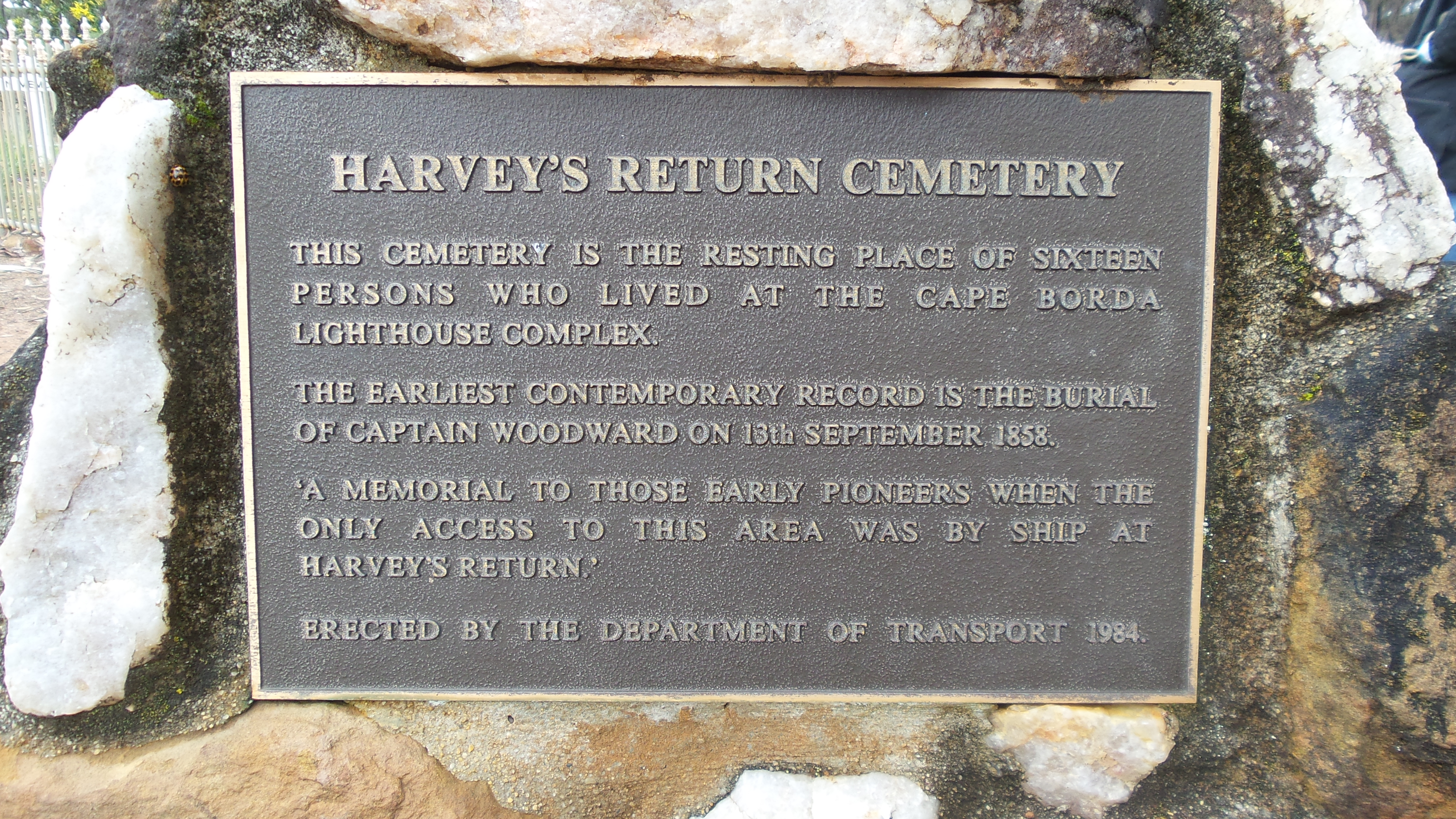
Harvey's Return plaque

== See also ==
- List of lighthouses in Australia
