= Vivonne Bay Conservation Park =

Protected area in South Australia

- IUCN category Ia (strict nature reserve)
- Location within South Australia
- Location: South Australia
- Nearest city: Vivonne Bay
- Coordinates: 36°00′30″S 137°09′30″E
- Area: 15.65 km^{2} (6.04 sq mi)
- Established: 21 January 1971
- Governing body: Department for Environment and Water

Vivonne Bay Conservation Park, formerly the Vivonne Bay National Park, is a protected area in the Australian state of South Australia located on the south coast of Kangaroo Island in the gazetted locality of Vivonne Bay. It was dedicated in 1971 to conserve coastal country containing vegetation not already protected in Kelly Hill Conservation Park.

== Description ==
The conservation park has an area of 1,565 hectares (3,870 acres), stretching from Point Ellen, at the western end of Vivonne Bay, south-westwards along the coast for about 5 km (3.1 mi), extending inland for 3 km (1.9 mi). The vegetation is mainly open scrub and open heath dominated by Eucalyptus diversifolia and E. rugosa, with low Calocephalus brownii shrubland on the coastal dunes and cliffs. The conservation park is classified as an IUCN Category Ia protected area.

== See also ==
- Vivonne (disambiguation)
