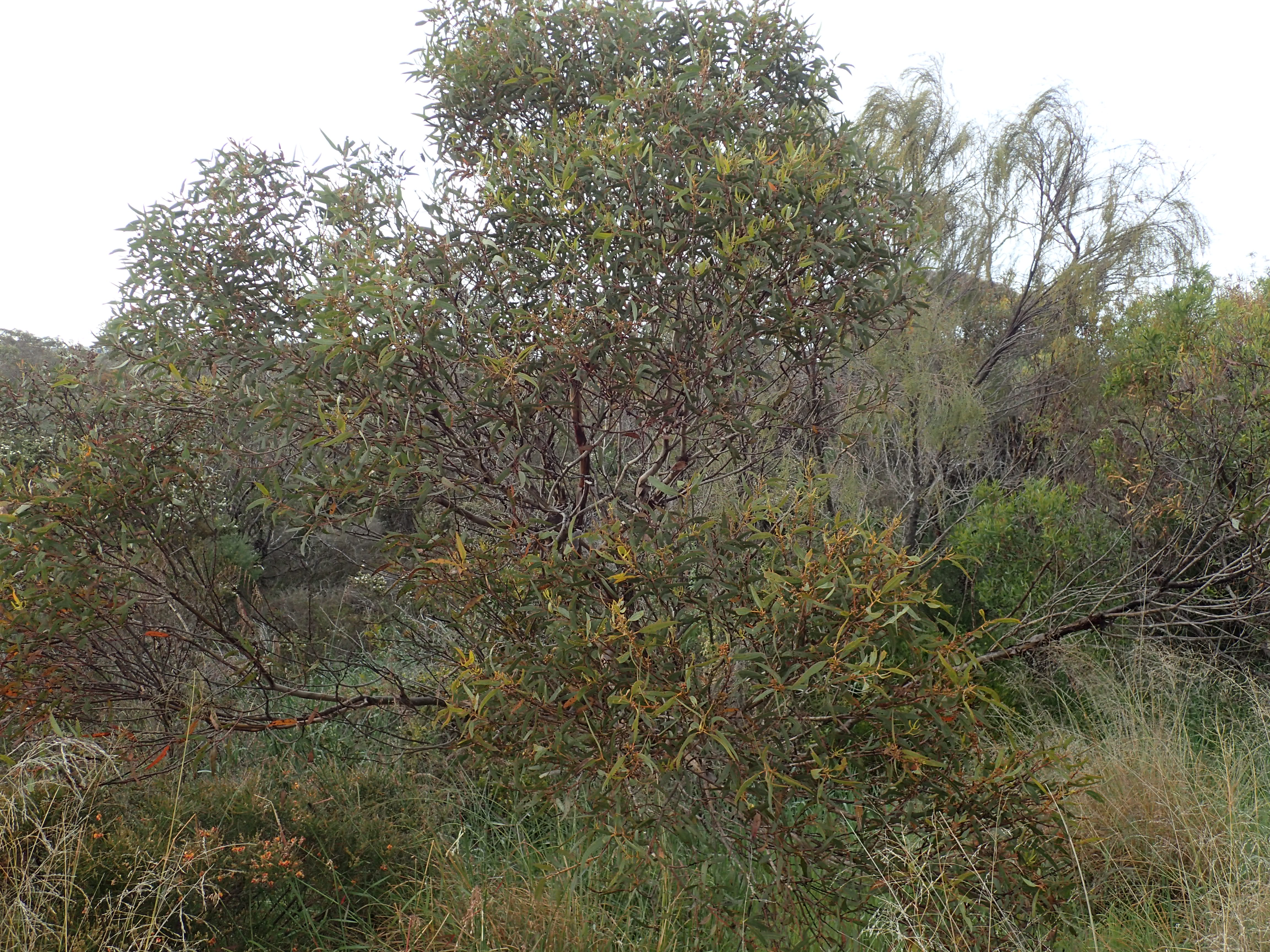
- Near Hopetoun

Conservation status
- Vulnerable (IUCN 3.1)

Scientific classification
- Kingdom: Plantae
- Clade: Tracheophytes
- Clade: Angiosperms
- Clade: Eudicots
- Clade: Rosids
- Order: Myrtales
- Family: Myrtaceae
- Genus: Eucalyptus
- Species: E. phenax

Binomial name
- Eucalyptus phenax Brooker & Slee

= Eucalyptus phenax =

Species of eucalyptus

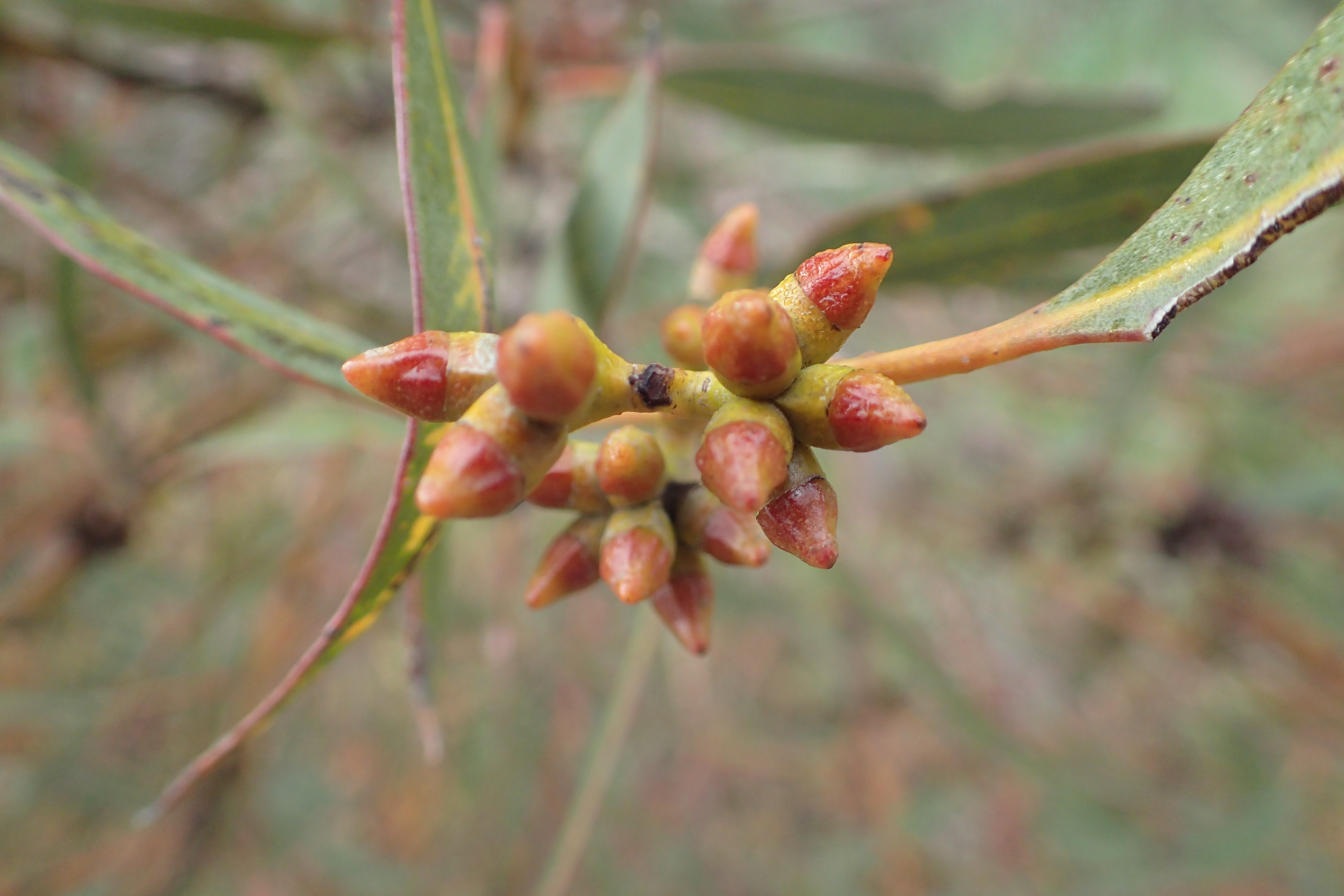
Flower buds

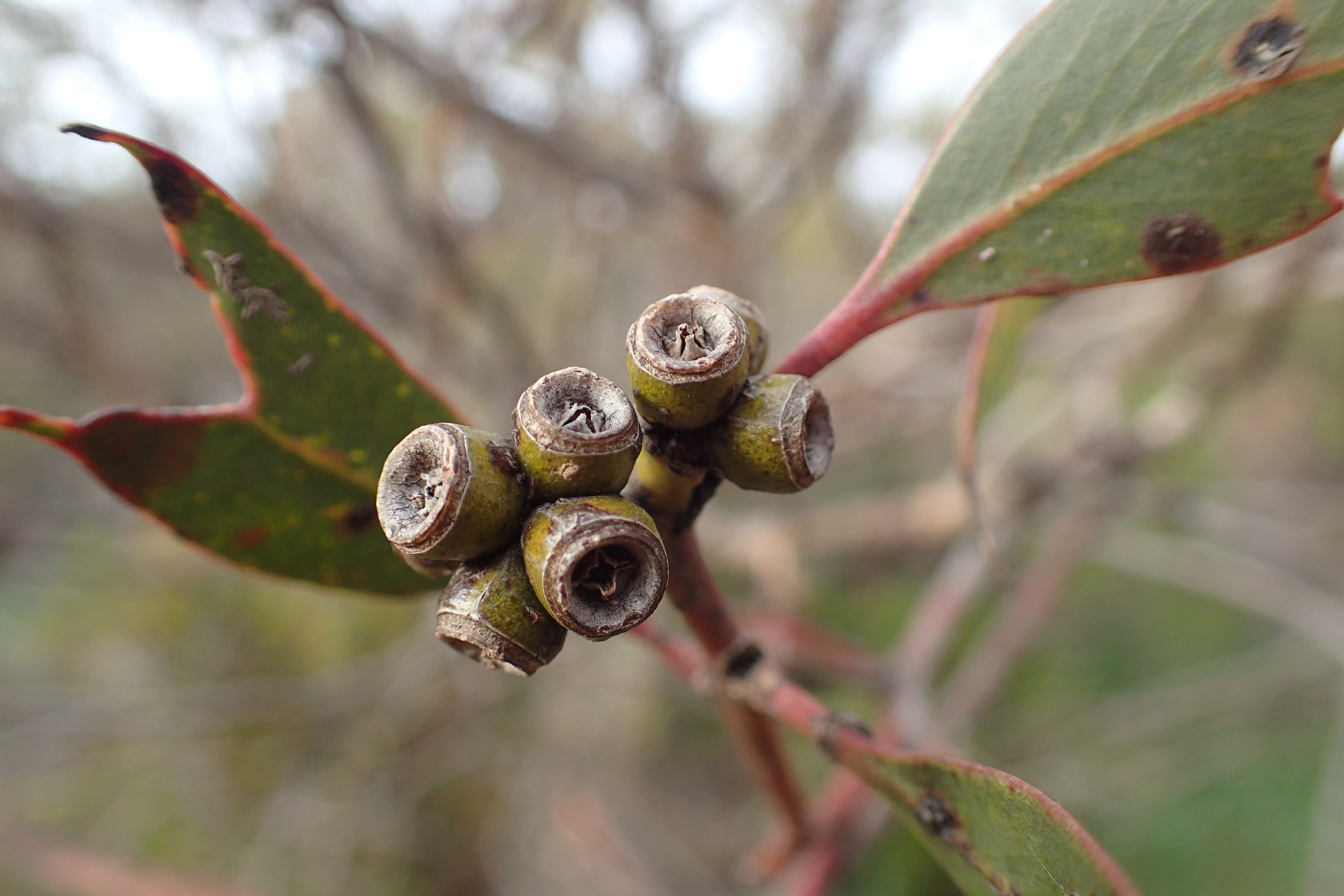
Fruit

Eucalyptus phenax, commonly known as green dumosa mallee or white mallee, is a species of mallee that is endemic to southern Australia. It has smooth bark, lance-shaped adult leaves, flower buds in groups of seven or nine, white flowers and cup-shaped to cylindrical fruit.

== Description ==
Eucalyptus phenax is a mallee or shrub that typically grows to a height of 3–8 m (9.8–26.2 ft) and forms a lignotuber. It has smooth, creamy grey bark that is shed in ribbons. Young plants and coppice regrowth have egg-shaped to lance-shaped leaves that are 40–90 mm (1.6–3.5 in) long and 9–30 mm (0.35–1.18 in) wide. Adult leaves are the same glossy green on both sides, lance-shaped, 50–120 mm (2.0–4.7 in) long and 8–35 mm (0.31–1.38 in) wide on a petiole 7–30 mm (0.28–1.18 in) long. The flower buds are arranged in leaf axils, usually in groups of seven or nine on an unbranched peduncle 3–18 mm (0.12–0.71 in) long, the individual buds sessile or on pedicels up to 3 mm (0.12 in) long. Mature buds are cylindrical to oval, 7–11 mm (0.28–0.43 in) long and 4–6 mm (0.16–0.24 in) wide with a conical to rounded operculum. Flowering occurs between October and May and the flowers are white. The fruit is a woody, cup-shaped to cylindrical capsule 4–10 mm (0.16–0.39 in) long and 5–8 mm (0.20–0.31 in) wide.

== Taxonomy and naming ==
Eucalyptus phenax was first formally described in 1996 by Ian Brooker and Andrew Slee from material collected by Dean Nicolle near Tailem Bend in 1985. The specific epithet (phenax) is an ancient Greek word meaning "imposter", referring to the fact that this species was previously known as E. anceps, now a synonym of E.rugosa.

In 2000, Dean Nicolle described two subspecies and the names have been accepted by the Australian Plant Census:

- Eucalyptus phenax subsp. compressa D. Nicolle that has longer peduncles, larger flower buds and fruit than subspecies phenax;
- Eucalyptus phenax Brooker & Slee subsp. phenax.

== Distribution and habitat ==
This eucalypt grows in mallee scrubs and is widely distributed in the southwest of Western Australia, the south-east of South Australia and the north-west of Victoria. It is most common in Western Australia where it occurs from near Bolgart through the southern wheatbelt to Esperance. Subspecies compressa is only known from the eastern side of Kangaroo Island and on the Fleurieu Peninsula.

== Conservation status ==
In Western Australia, this eucalypt is classified as "not threatened" in Western Australia by the Western Australian Government Department of Parks and Wildlife. The IUCN Red List assesses the species as Vulnerable.

== See also ==
- List of Eucalyptus species
