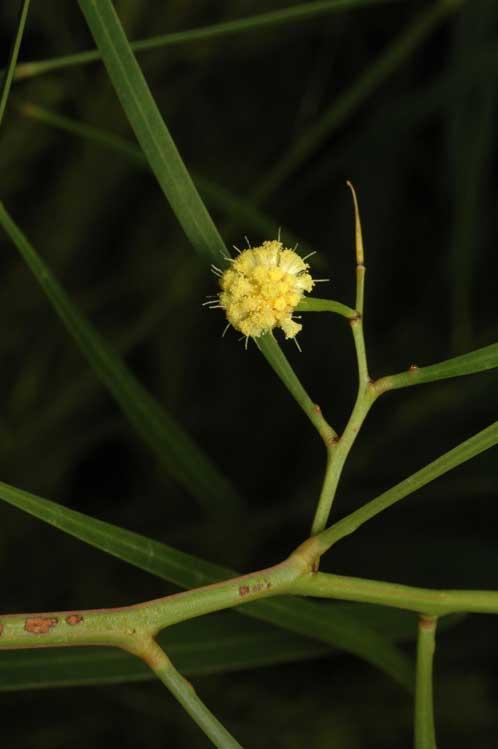
- In the Australian National Botanic Gardens

Scientific classification
- Kingdom: Plantae
- Clade: Tracheophytes
- Clade: Angiosperms
- Clade: Eudicots
- Clade: Rosids
- Order: Fabales
- Family: Fabaceae
- Subfamily: Caesalpinioideae
- Clade: Mimosoid clade
- Genus: Acacia
- Species: A. gillii

Binomial name
- Acacia gillii Maiden & Blakely
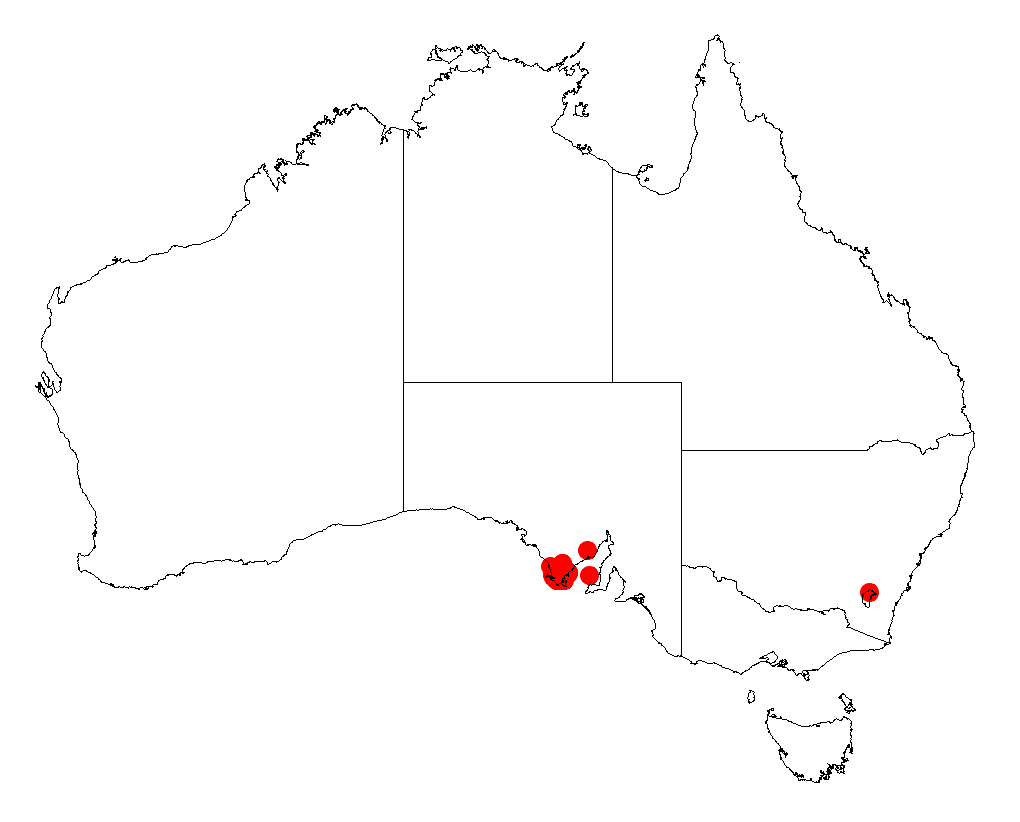
- Occurrence data from AVH

Synonyms
- Acacia pycnantha var. angustifolia Benth.; Acacia retinodes var. angustifolia (Benth.) J.M.Black; Acacia retinodes var. gillii Maiden orth. var.; Acacia retinodes var. gilliorum Maiden nom. illeg., nom. superfl.nom. illeg.; Acacia rhetinodes var. angustifolia J.M.Black orth. var.nom. illeg.; Acacia rhetinodes var. gillii J.M.Black orth. var.nom. illeg.; Racosperma gillii (Maiden & Blakely) Pedley nom. illeg.

= Acacia gillii =

Gill's wattle

Species of plant

Acacia gillii, commonly known as Gill's wattle, is a species of flowering plant in the family Fabaceae and is endemic to South Australia. It is a straggly, open shrub with pendulous branches, glabrous, dark reddish brown branchlets, narrowly lance-shaped or linear phyllodes, spherical heads of golden yellow flowers and linear, leathery to crusty, glabrous pods.

== Description ==
Acacia gillii is a straggly, open shrub that typically grows to a height of 2–4 m (6 ft 7 in – 13 ft 1 in) and has a pendulous branches and winding branchlets that are flat or angled at the ends, dark reddish brown and glabrous. The phyllodes are lance-shaped with the narrower end towards the base or linear, 50–175 mm (2.0–6.9 in) long, 6–15 mm (0.24–0.59 in) wide, leathery and glabrous with the midrib and edges prominent. There is a gland 1–10 mm (0.039–0.394 in) above the pulvinus. The flowers are borne in spherical heads in racemes 20–80 mm (0.79–3.15 in) long on peduncles 10–20 mm (0.39–0.79 in) long, each headwith 43 to 72 densely arranged golden yellow flowers. Flowering occurs at irregular periods throughout the year, and the pods are linear, up to 170 mm (6.7 in) long, 5–7 mm (0.20–0.28 in) wide, glabrous and leathery to crusty. The seeds are elliptic, 4.5–6.0 mm (0.18–0.24 in) long and dull black with a club-shaped aril.

== Taxonomy ==
Acacia gillii was first formally described in 1927 by the botanists Joseph Maiden and William Blakely in the Journal and Proceedings of the Royal Society of New South Wales. The specific epithet (gillii) honours Walter Gill who collected the type specimen and Thomas Gill, a public servant.

== Distribution and habitat ==
Gill's wattle is found in a small area of South Australia in southern parts of the Eyre Peninsula from near Port Lincoln to Ungarra, where it grows in clay or loam in open scrub, often with Eucalyptus diversifolia and Eucalyptus phenax.

== See also ==
- List of Acacia species
