= Island Seaway =

Ship built in 1987

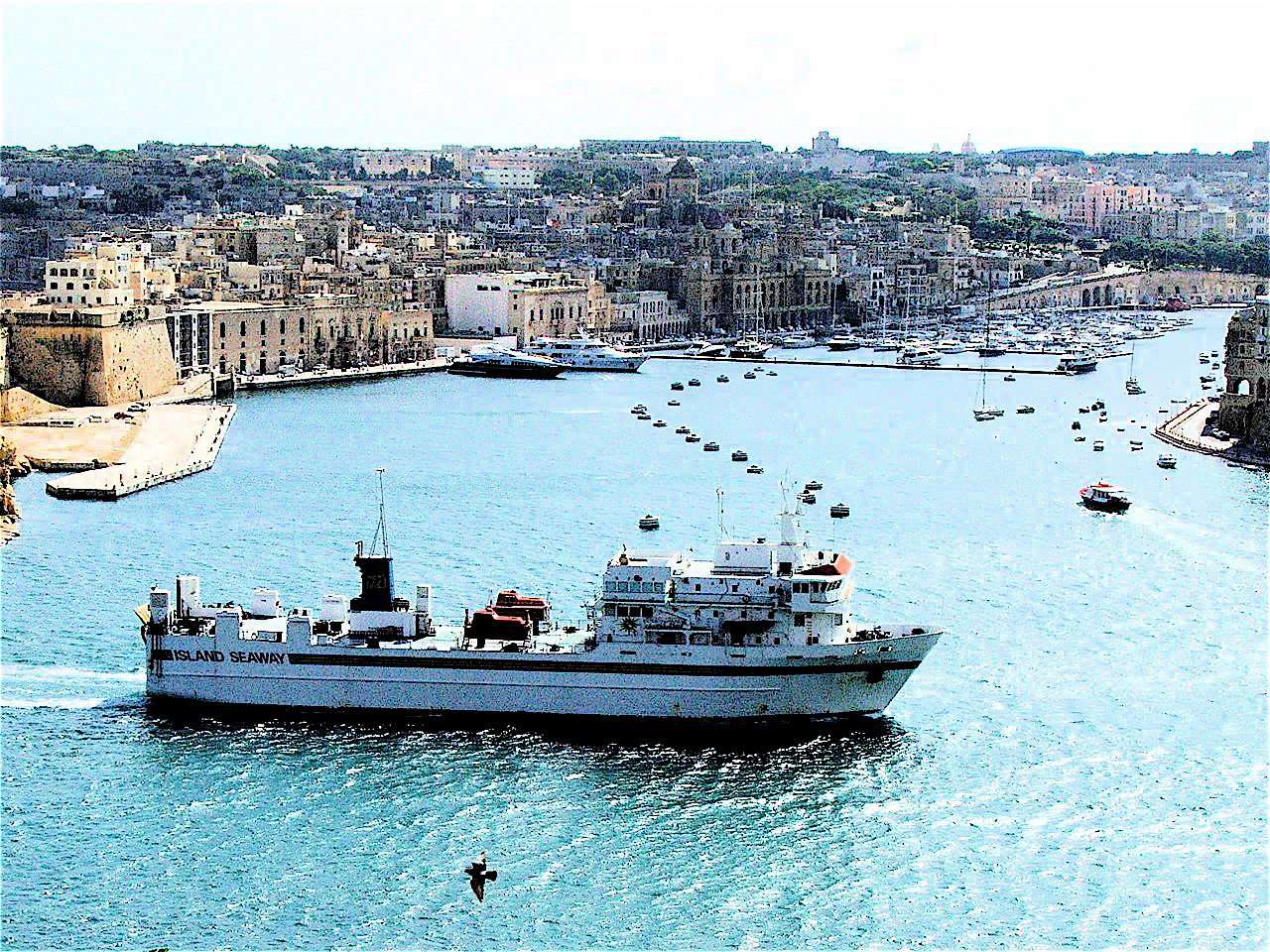

History
- Builder: Eglo Engineering
- Yard number: 3
- Laid down: 6 May 1986
- Launched: 13 May 1987
- Maiden voyage: 13 November 1987
- Identification: IMO number: 8600739
- Fate: Scrapped

General characteristics
- Tonnage: 3,235 GRT, 996 DWT
- Length: 80.35 metres
- Beam: 16.53 metres
- Draught: 3.67 metres
- Installed power: Mirrlees Blackstone
- Speed: 11 knots

Island Seaway was a roll-on/roll-off ship operated by RW Miller between Port Lincoln, Adelaide and Kangaroo Island in South Australia.

Built by Eglo Engineering, Port Adelaide in 1987 to replace the Troubridge, it made its maiden voyage on 13 November 1987.

After the Port Lincoln to Kangaroo Island service ceased in March 1995, the Island Seaway was sold. It was renamed Seaboard Supporter in November 2011 and Flying Viking in March 2012 under Norwegian ownership.
