= MV Troubridge =

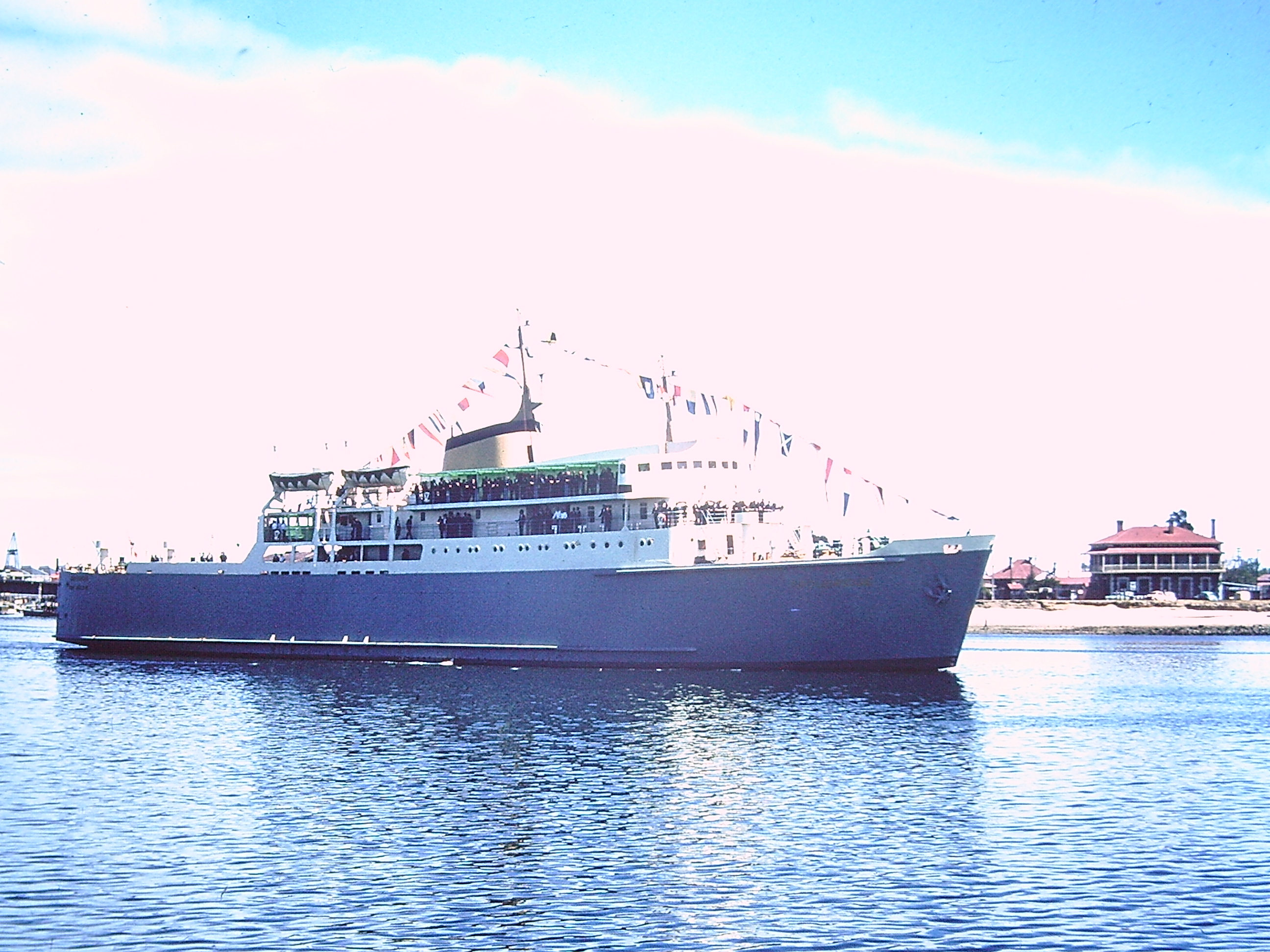
- Maiden voyage of MV Troubridge, Port Adelaide

History

Australia Australia
- Name: MV Troubridge (1962-ca1987); City of Famagusta; European Glory; Karden; Marwa
- Namesake: Sir Thomas Troubridge, 1st Baronet
- Owner: South Australian Steamship Company (1961-1977); RW Miller and South Australian Government
- Port of registry: Adelaide
- Builder: Evans Deakin & Company of Brisbane, Queensland
- Identification: IMO number: 5369437
- Fate: Scrapped 2004

General characteristics
- Type: Roll on roll off ferry
- Tonnage: 1,995 GRT
- Length: 291 ft 6 in (88.85 m)
- Beam: 50 ft 1 in (15.27 m)
- Draught: 13 ft 1 in (3.99 m)
- Ramps: 1 rear ramp
- Installed power: Twin Polar Diesel 4110BHp
- Speed: 14.5 knots (26.8 km/h)
- Capacity: 582 tons (591 tonnes)

MV Troubridge was a ferry that served the South Australian coastal trade between Port Adelaide, Kingscote on Kangaroo Island and Port Lincoln. She was built by Evans Deakin & Company, of Brisbane, Queensland as a roll on roll off ferry to minimise loading time and maximise time spent at sea.

== Operational history ==
Troubridge was built to replace SS Karatta in serving on the Adelaide - Kingscote - Port Lincoln route. She began services to Kingscote and Port Lincoln in 1961. Services to Port Lincoln were eventually discontinued leaving Troubridge to dedicated Kingscote Services. She operated until 1 June 1987, when she was replaced by Island Seaway.

Troubridge was sold and went to Malta in 1990 as City of Famagusta. She was then bought by European Seaways and renamed European Glory. Her ownership passed to Poseidon Lines, under the name Sea Wave. In 1995 she was registered in Turkey as Karden. She was re-registered in North Korea in 2003 as Marwa, before being finally scrapped in Turkey in 2004.
