= Little Sahara =

Little Sahara may refer to:

- Little Sahara (Kangaroo Island), a sand dune system on Kangaroo Island in South Australia
- Little Sahara Recreation Area in Utah
- Little Sahara State Park in Oklahoma
