= Ravine des Casoars =

Gorge and associated drainage basin in Australia

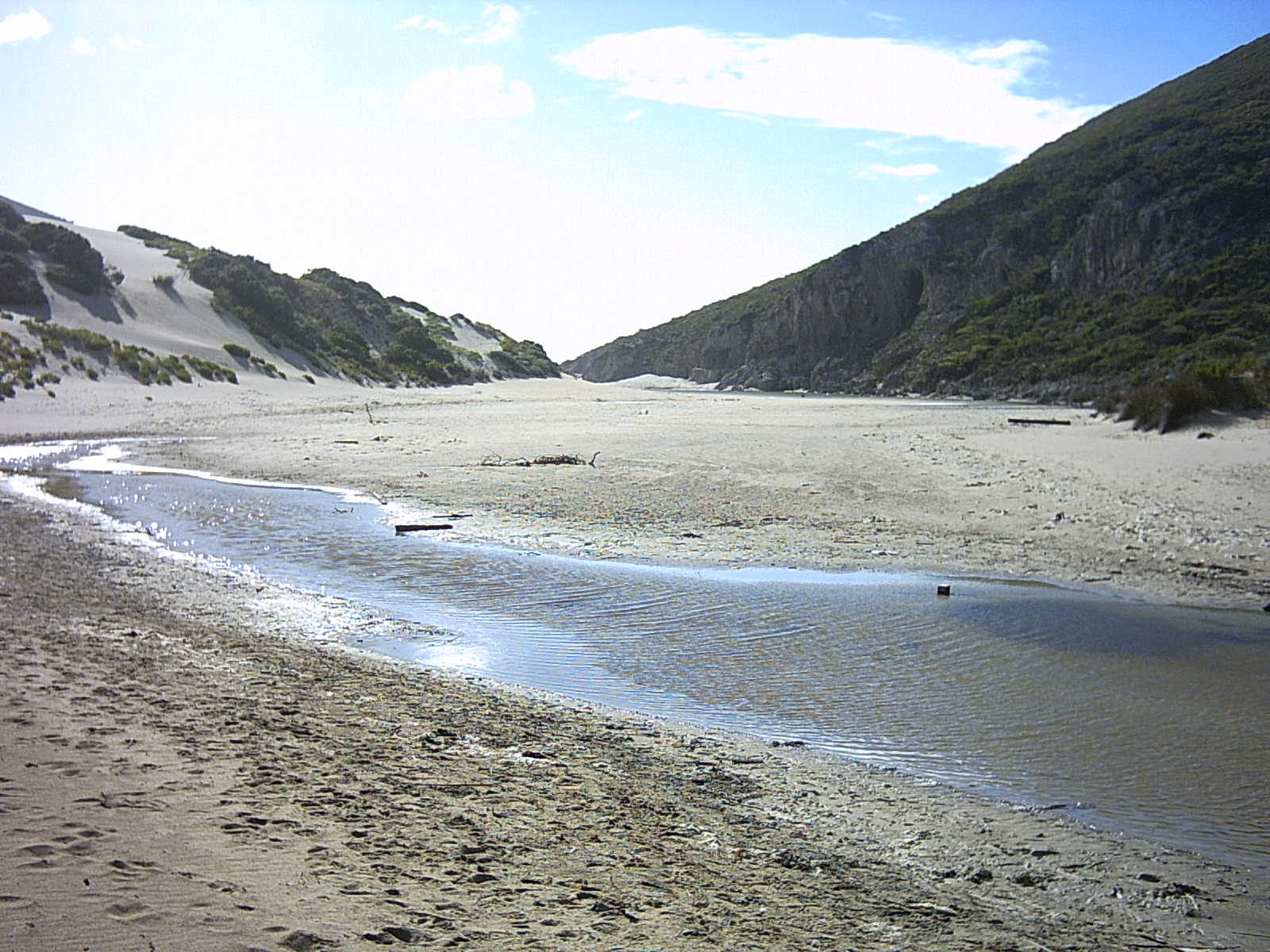
- Ravine des Casoars

- Location within South Australia
- Length: 3 kilometres (1.9 miles) east–west
- Area: 96 square kilometres (37 square miles)
- Depth: 100 metres (330 feet)

Geography
- Coordinates: 35°47′34.72″S 136°34′44.57″E
- Interactive map of Ravine des Casoars

Ravine des Casoars (English: Ravine of the Cassowaries) is a gorge and an associated drainage basin in the Australian state of South Australia located on the west coast of Kangaroo Island about 95 kilometres (59 miles) west of Kingscote.

== Description ==
The Ravine des Casoars is a steep sided valley of 3 kilometres (1.9 miles) length with an east–west alignment and with a maximum depth of 100 metres (330 feet). The ravine drains a catchment area of approximately 9,600 hectares (24,000 acres) within the western end of Kangaroo Island.

The ravine meets the sea on the west coast of Kangaroo Island via a gap of about 120 metres (390 feet) width in the coastline's continuous cliff line. A beach is located between the two headlands. The beach and an accompanying sand dune extends about 600 metres (2,000 feet) back into the south side of the ravine to an elevation of about 100 metres (330 feet) while a creek and an associated lagoon flows on the north side of the ravine.

The base of the cliffs on the northern side of the beach had eroded with the result of caves being formed. As of 1965, two caves were described. The first known as ‘K5’ which accommodated at the time in this entrance, a little penguin rookery, was described as being 50 feet (15 metres) wide and as having a ‘massive rockfall’ and decoration including flowstone. The penguin rookery was also noted by author and naturalist Mervinia Masterman in her book Flinder's Chase Revisited (1972).

Adjacent to ‘K5’ is ‘K16’ which was described as being 400 feet (120 metres) long, 40 feet (12 metres) wide and 10 feet (3.0 metres) high with decoration consisting of rimstone and stalactites.

== History ==
=== Aboriginal use ===
Aboriginal sites have been identified by the South Australian Museum at Ravine des Casoars. As of 1999, radiocarbon dating of material recovered via archaeological excavation from sites at Cape du Couedic and Rocky River to the south of the ravine's catchment area suggest Aboriginal presence in the western end of Kangaroo Island from approximately 7,500 years BP to as recent as 350–400 years BP.

=== European discovery ===
The members of the Baudin expedition of 1800-03 were the first Europeans known to have visited the ravine. Baudin reportedly named the ravine after the numbers of the now-extinct Kangaroo Island Emu present at the time and which he mistook for the Cassowary. Reliable witnesses have reported the existence of an inscription in one of the caves on the coast where Ravine des Casoars meets the sea bearing Baudin's name and several other names of French origin. As of 1999, the inscription had not been located, possibly due to temporary obscurement by the movement of sand within the cave and other changes in the level of the cave floor.

== Protected area status ==
Ravine des Casoars is currently located within the protected area of the same name - the Ravine des Casoars Wilderness Protection Area.
