= Vivonne Bay (South Australia) =

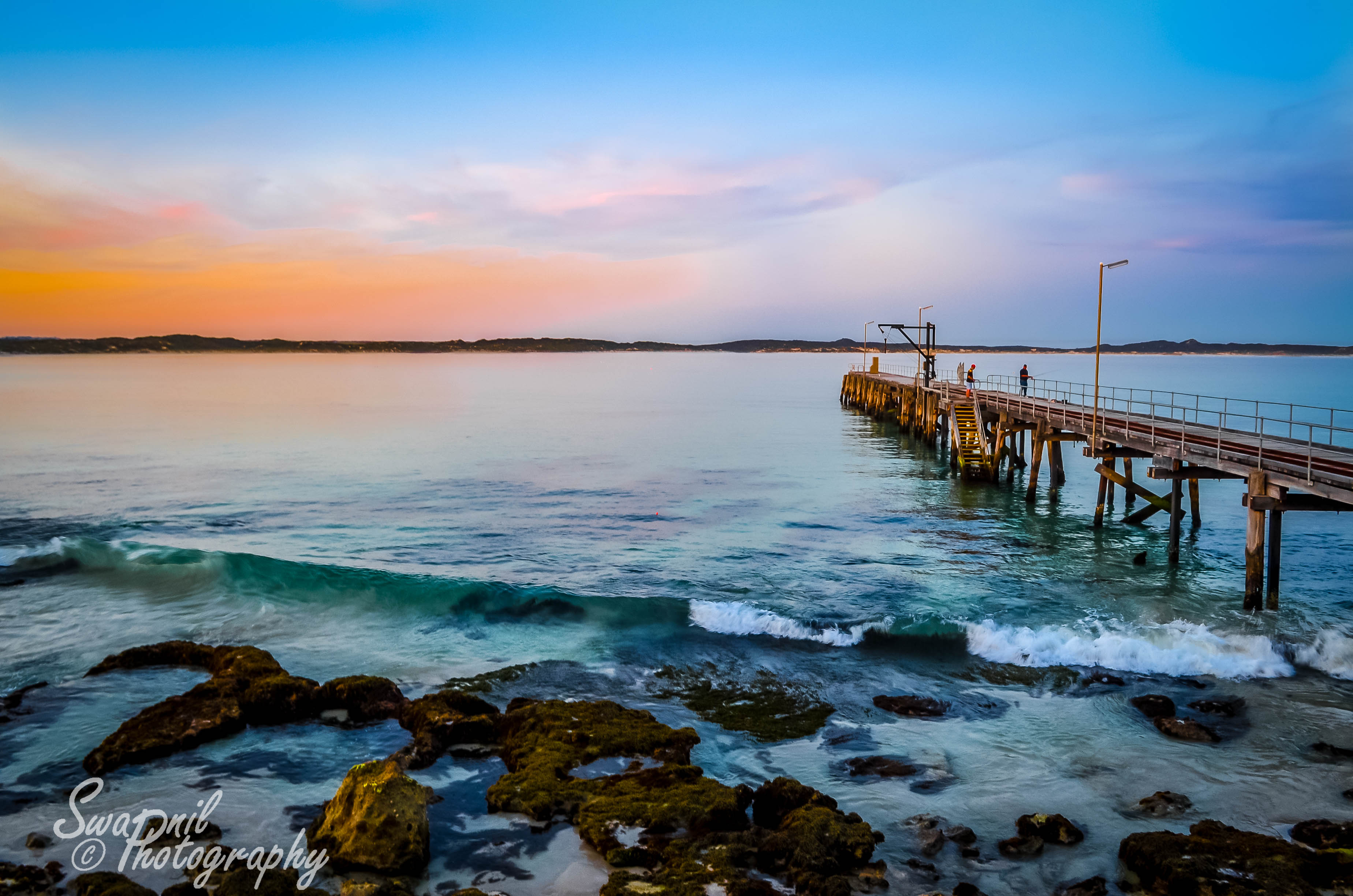
- View of Vivonne Bay at sunset

- Location in South Australia
- Location: Kangaroo Island, South Australia
- Coordinates: 35°58′53″S 137°10′50″E
- Type: Bay
- Primary inflows: Eleanor River; Harriet River
- Basin countries: Australia
- Frozen: never
- Settlements: Vivonne Bay

Vivonne Bay (French: Baie Vivonne) is a bay in the Australian state of South Australia located on the south coast of Kangaroo Island about 61 kilometres (38 mi) from Kingscote, the island's main town, and which was named by the members of Baudin expedition to Australia who visited the bay in January 1803. In a survey of 10,000 beaches by Professor Andrew Short, director of Sydney University's marine studies centre, the beach at Vivonne Bay was adjudged as one of the best in Australia.

== Description ==
=== Location ===
Vivonne Bay is located on the south coast of the Kangaroo Island in South Australia overlooking the body of water known in Australia as the Southern Ocean and by international authorities as the Great Australian Bight about 61 kilometres (38 mi) south-west of the municipal seat of Kingscote.

=== Extent ===
Vivonne Bay has been described in an American source as being "a bight in the coast" between Point Ellen in the west and the Eleanor River in the east which is referred to as being the ‘Mary River’ and which is located about 1.75 nautical miles (3.24 km; 2.01 mi) north-northeast of Point Ellen. While the American source does nominate an eastern extremity, the official Australian source does not.

=== Depth ===
The depth of water within the bay is reported as being in the range of 9.1 to 11 metres (30 to 36 ft). The bay is reported as being suitable as an anchorage where there is a need to shelter from northerly and westerly winds. However, the bay is considered to be unsuitable as an anchorage in the case of "fresh SE winds" as "there is no space to get underway if the wind increases and a sea is raised."

=== Coastline ===
The bay's coastline consists of a curved sandy beach of about 5 kilometres (3.1 mi) in length with a western end relatively sheltered from wave action by Point Ellen and an eastern end that is subject to "higher wave energy" with the result of "well-developed offshore bars" being formed and the Eleanor River being "constricted due to the large volumes of marine-sourced sand" being recycled and trapped in its mouth. Point Ellen is described as being "a grassy mound 8.5m high" that is "bordered by low rocks at its base" and is formed of a "Pleistocene aeolianite, i.e. a "dune limestone." Two rivers, the Harriet and the Eleanor, flow into the bay with the Harriet being located at the west end and the Eleanor located at the east end. The Harriet River has an estuary coastal lagoon system at its mouth due to the local absence of the "bedrock cliffs" that dominate Kangaroo Island's coastline.

== History ==
=== European discovery ===
The bay was named by a member of the Baudin expedition to Australia in January 1803 after one of the following persons - Louis Victor de Rochechouart de Mortemart (1636–1688), a Marshal of France or Catherine de Vivonne, marquise de Rambouillet (1588–1665), a member of the French nobility. Two sources state that the bay was named by Nicolas Baudin while a third source states that Baudin himself did not visit the southern coast of Kangaroo Island and that it was explored by the Casuarina commanded by Louis de Freycinet and a fourth which states that the bay was named by François Péron and Freycinet.

=== 2011 drownings ===
Vivonne Bay is recognised as having a significant undertow and at times a sizeable swell, and is therefore suited only to experienced swimmers.

In April 2011, two Australian tourists drowned when a large wave swept them out to sea as they posed for a photograph with their backs to the water at Point Ellen at the western end of the bay.

=== Fires ===
Vivonne Bay was impacted by bushfires in January 2020 which necessitated the evacuation of Vivonne Bay township and surrounding areas on Thursday 9 January 2020

== Settlements and port infrastructure ==
There is some evidence that a shore-based bay whaling station operated in the bay in the 1840s.

A settlement known as Vivonne Bay is located on the coastline near the mouth of the Harriet River. Port infrastructure within the bay consists of a jetty located on the west side of the bay adjoining Point Ellen and having a length of 79 metres (259 ft). As of 2014, navigation aids within Vivonne Bay consisted of a light on Point Ellen.

== See also ==
- Vivonne (disambiguation)
- Vivonne Bay Conservation Park
