= SS Karatta =

Australian Cargo Boat

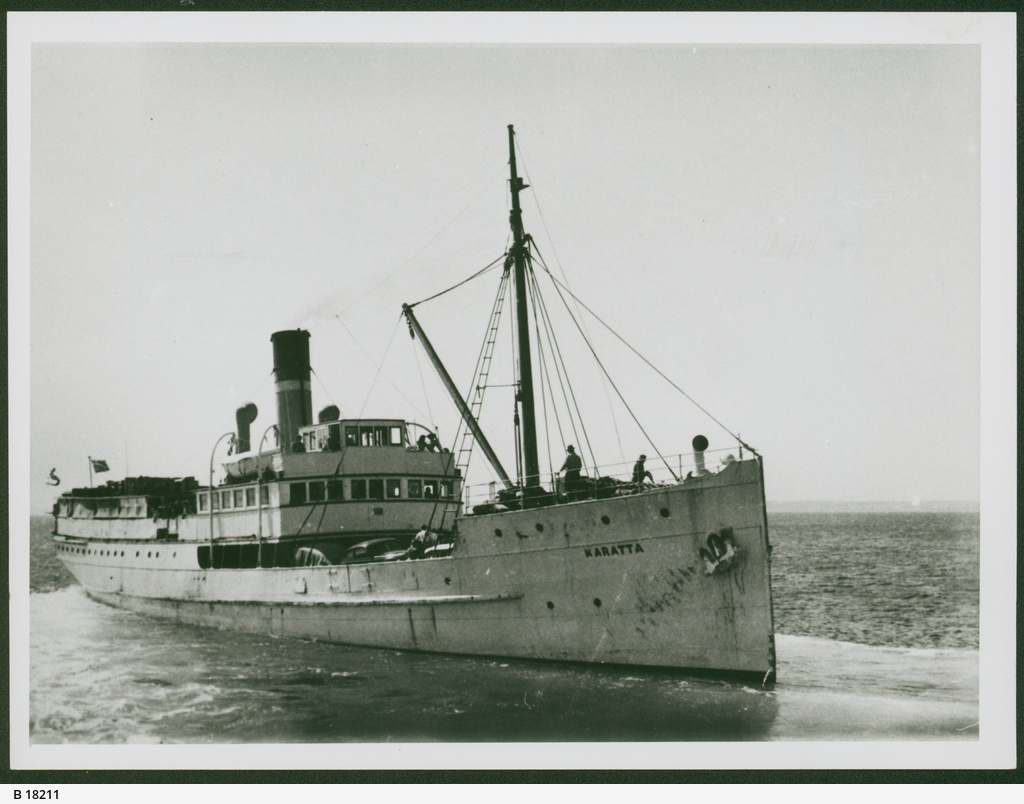
The SS Karatta circa 1950.

The SS Karatta was a steam-powered vessel that operated in South Australian waters. It mainly operated for 54 years between 1907 and 1961. Its last voyage was on 3 November 1961, and it was sold five days later to be broken up. It spent its career carrying goods and passengers between Adelaide, Kingscote (on Kangaroo Island) and Port Lincoln. It was replaced by the MV Troubridge in 1961.
