= Vivonne (disambiguation) =

Vivonne is a commune in France.

Vivonne may also refer to:

== People ==
- Louis Victor de Rochechouart de Mortemart (1636-1688), known by the name Vivonne
- Catherine de Vivonne, marquise de Rambouillet (1588-1665), a member of the French nobility.

== Places ==
- Cape Vivonne, a headland located in the locality of Ceduna Waters, South Australia
- Vivonne Bay (South Australia), a bay on Kangaroo Island in South Australia
  - Vivonne Bay, South Australia (locality), a locality
  - Vivonne Bay Conservation Park, a protected area in South Australia
