= Cape Bouguer Wilderness Protection Area =

Protected area in South Australia

- IUCN category Ib (wilderness area)
- Location within South Australia
- Location: South Australia
- Nearest city: Kingscote
- Coordinates: 36°0′54″S 136°55′56″E
- Area: 52.98 km^{2} (20.46 sq mi)
- Established: 15 October 1993
- Governing body: Department for Environment and Water

Cape Bouguer Wilderness Protection Area is a protected area located on the south coast of Kangaroo Island in South Australia about 84 kilometres (52 miles) south-west of Kingscote. The wilderness protection area was proclaimed in October 1993 under the Wilderness Protection Act 1992 to "protect and preserve the outstandingly high wilderness qualities of the area". It was created on land excised from the Kelly Hill Conservation Park. It is classified as an IUCN Category Ib protected area.

== See also ==
- Protected areas of South Australia
- Karatta, South Australia
