= Kelly Hill Conservation Park =

Protected area in South Australia

- IUCN category III (natural monument or feature)
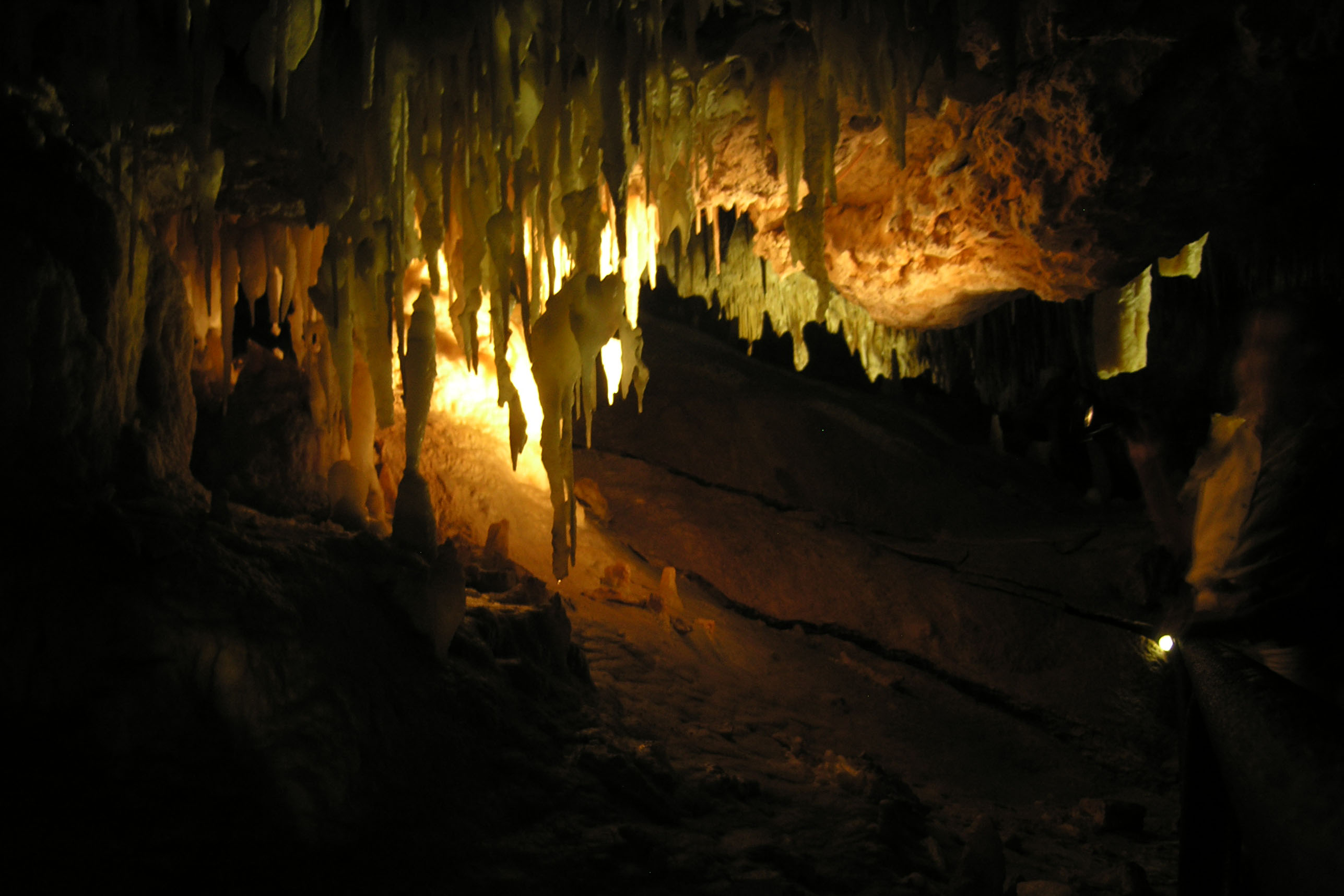
- Stalactite in Kelly Hill caves

- Location within South Australia
- Location: South Australia
- Nearest city: Kingscote
- Coordinates: 35°59′4″S 136°55′6″E
- Area: 2,176 ha (8.40 sq mi)
- Established: 21 January 1971
- Governing body: Department for Environment and Water
- Website: Official website

Kelly Hill Conservation Park, formerly the Kelly Hill National Park, is a protected area in South Australia located on Kangaroo Island. The Kelly Hill Caves system is the main attraction within the conservation park. In 1993, a portion of the conservation park was excised to create the Cape Bouguer Wilderness Protection Area. It is classified as an IUCN Category III protected area.

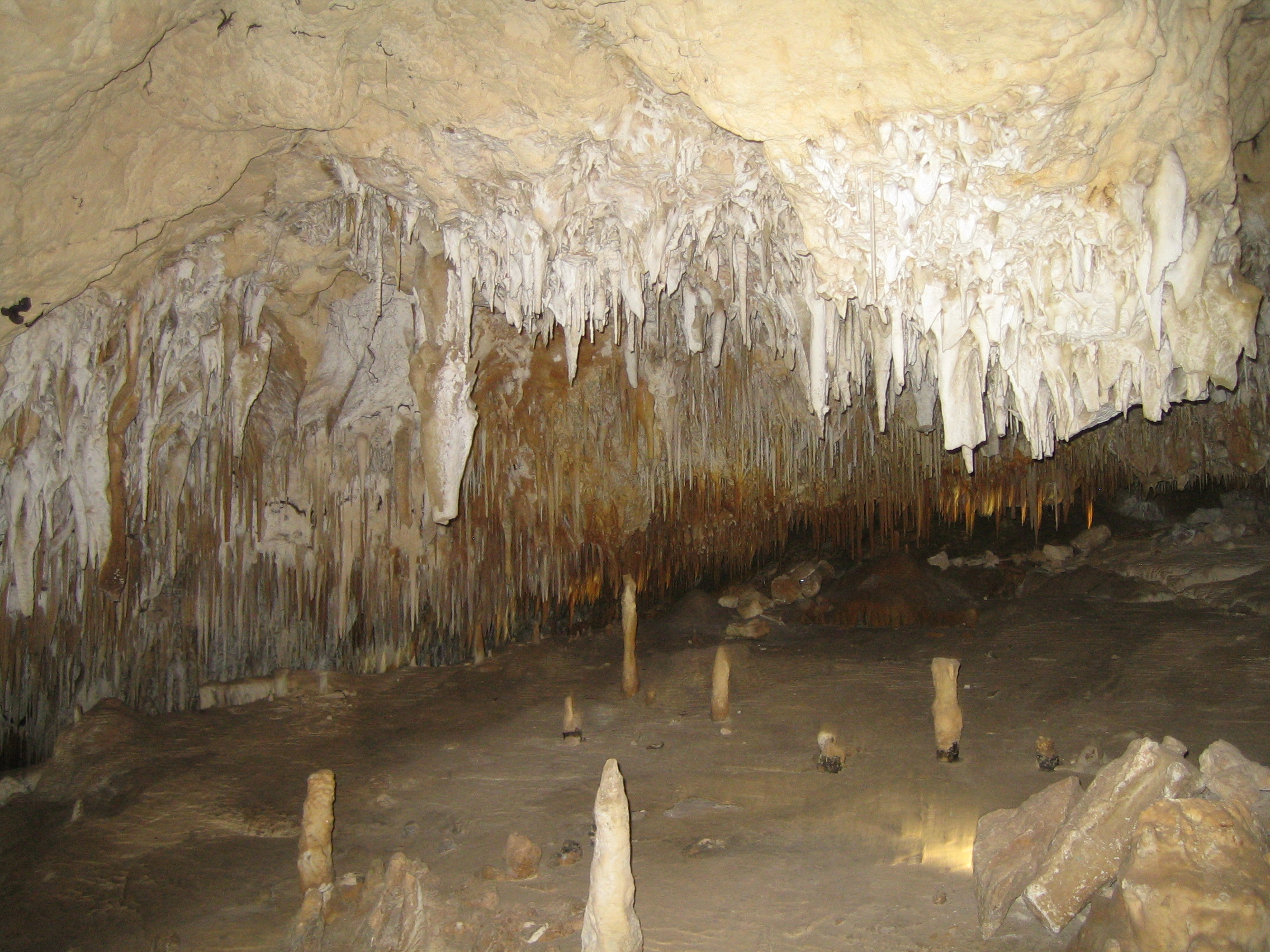
Inside Kelly Hill caves

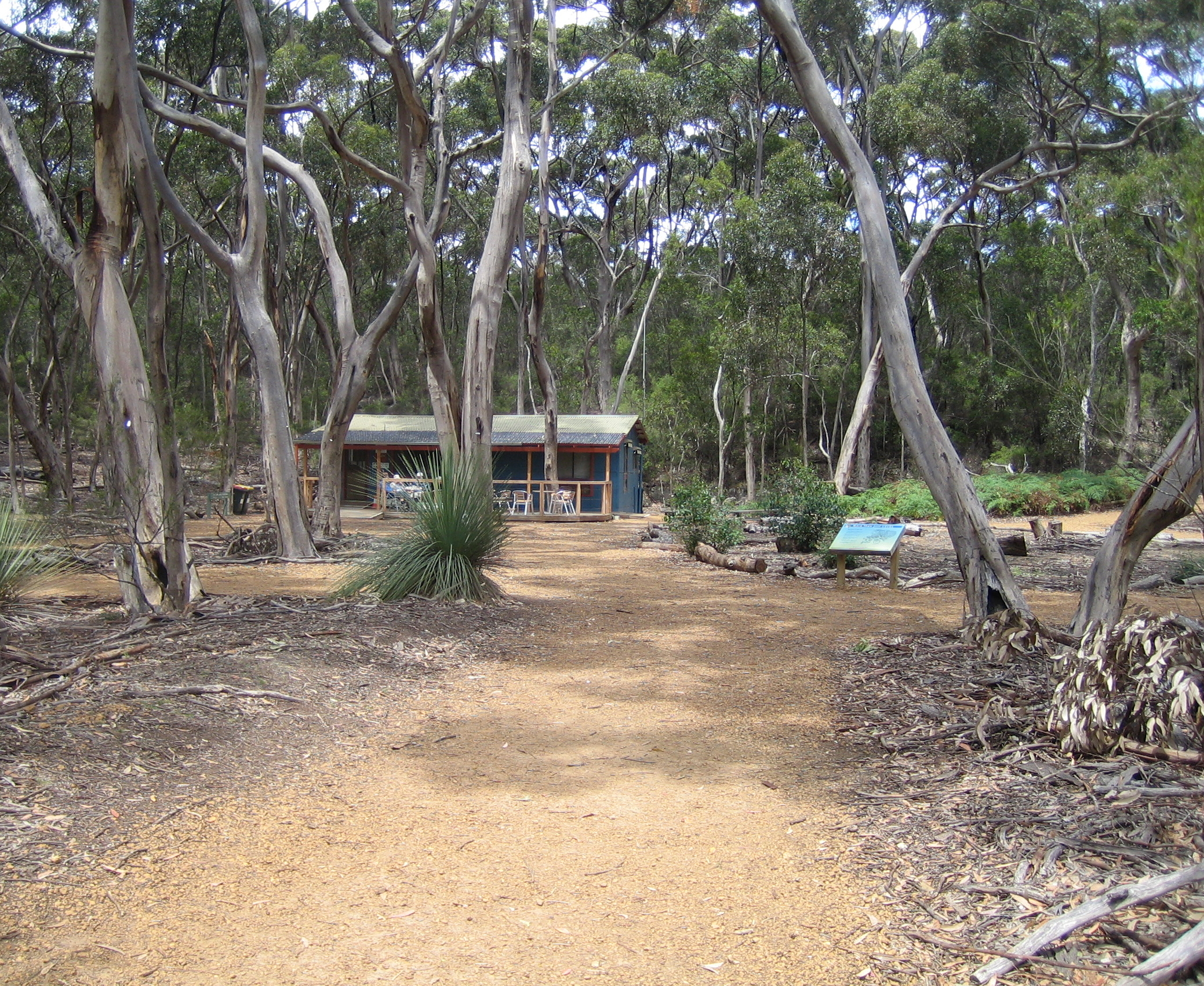
Visitors centre

== See also ==
- Karatta, South Australia
- Protected areas of South Australia
