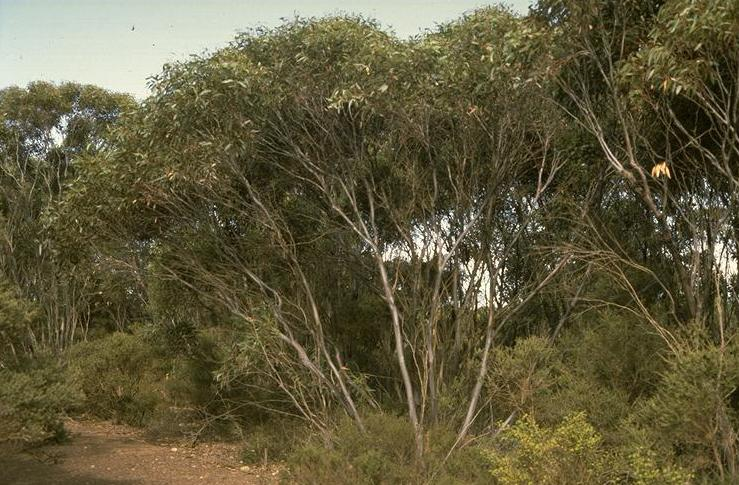
- Eucalyptus rugosa

Conservation status
- Near Threatened (IUCN 3.1)

Scientific classification
- Kingdom: Plantae
- Clade: Tracheophytes
- Clade: Angiosperms
- Clade: Eudicots
- Clade: Rosids
- Order: Myrtales
- Family: Myrtaceae
- Genus: Eucalyptus
- Species: E. rugosa

Binomial name
- Eucalyptus rugosa R.Br. ex Blakely

Synonyms
- Eucalyptus anceps R.Br. ex Maiden nom. inval., nom. subnud.; Eucalyptus anceps (R.Br. ex Maiden) Blakely; Eucalyptus conglobata var. anceps R.Br. ex Maiden

= Eucalyptus rugosa =

Kingscote mallee

Species of eucalyptus

Eucalyptus rugosa, commonly known as the Kingscote mallee, is a species of mallee that is endemic to coastal areas of southeastern Western Australia and southern South Australia. It has smooth bark, lance-shaped adult leaves, flower buds in groups of between seven and thirteen, white flowers and cup-shaped, conical or hemispherical fruit.

== Description ==
Eucalyptus rugosa is a mallee that typically grows to a height of 9–10 m (30–33 ft) and forms a lignotuber. It has smooth, cream-coloured to grey bark, sometimes with strips of bark hanging in the upper branches. Youn plants and coppice regrowth have dull green to greyish green, egg-shaped to lance-shaped leaves that are 50–85 mm (2.0–3.3 in) long and 20–40 mm (0.79–1.57 in) wide. Adult leaves are the same shade of glossy green on both sides, lance-shaped or broadly lance-shaped, 50–120 mm (2.0–4.7 in) long and 7–30 mm (0.28–1.18 in) wide on a petiole 6–27 mm (0.24–1.06 in) long. The flower buds are arranged in leaf axils in groups of between seven and thirteen on an unbranched peduncle 6–20 mm (0.24–0.79 in) long, the individual buds sessile or on pedicels up to 5 mm (0.20 in) long. Mature buds are oval or cylindrical, 8–12 mm (0.31–0.47 in) long and 5–8 mm (0.20–0.31 in) wide with a rounded to flattened operculum. Flowering occurs from September to November or from January to February or May and the flowers are white. The fruit is a woody cup-shaped, conical or hemispherical capsule 6–115 mm (0.24–4.53 in) long and 6–10 mm (0.24–0.39 in) wide with the valves near rim level or slightly protruding.

== Taxonomy and naming ==
Eucalyptus rugosa was first formally described in 1903 by William Blakely from an unpublished manuscript by Robert Brown. Blakely's description was published in his book A Critical Revision of the Genus Eucalyptus. The specific epithet (rugosa) is from the Latin rugosus meaning "wrinkled", referring to the buds and fruit.

== Distribution and habitat ==
Kingscote mallee grows in mallee shrubland in shallow soils over limestone in coastal districts. Dean Nicolle considers the species to be endemic to South Australia, occurring between Fowlers Bay in the east to the south-east coast and Kangaroo Island, but E. rugosa is also considered to occur in Western Australia by the Western Australian Herbarium.

== Conservation status ==
This mallee is listed as "not threatened" in Western Australia by the Western Australian Government Department of Parks and Wildlife. The IUCN Red List assesses the species as Near Threatened.

== See also ==
- List of Eucalyptus species
