= Kangaroo Island =

Island in South Australia

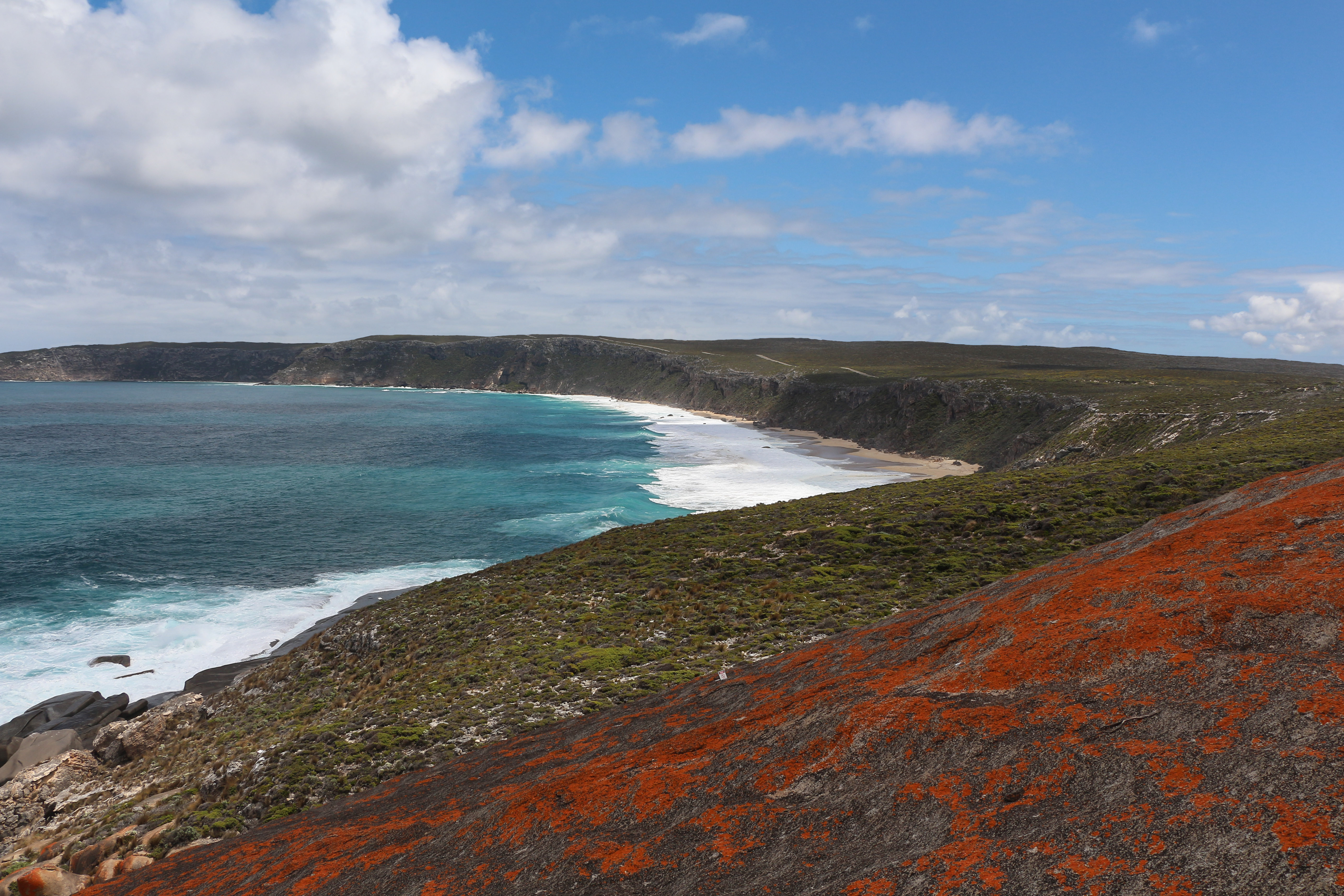
- View of the south west of the island

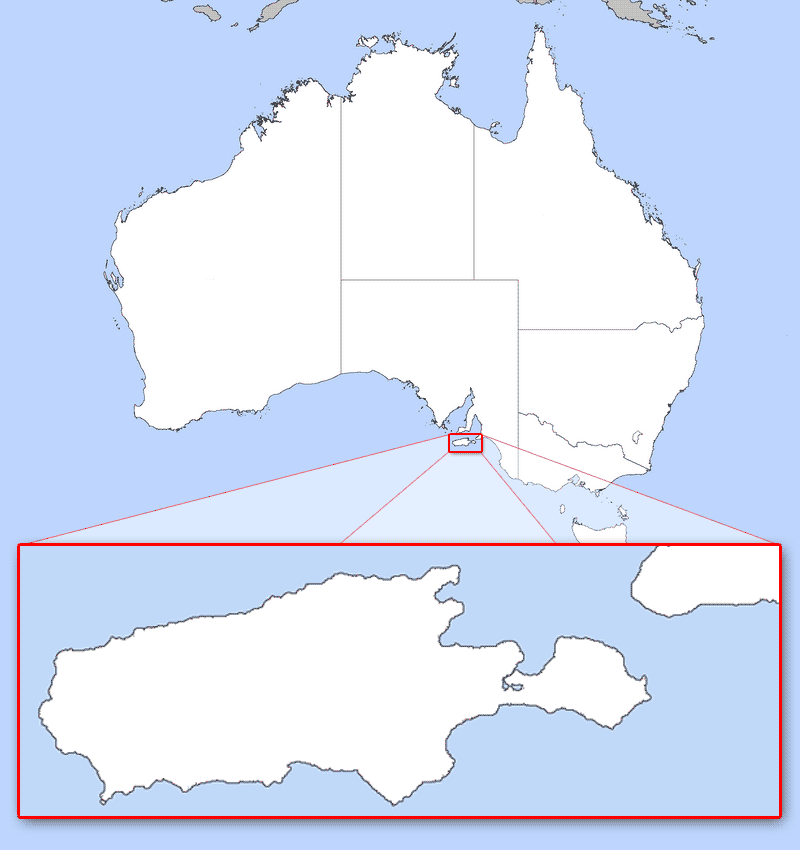

- Location within South Australia Location within Australia

Geography
- Location: Great Australian Bight
- Coordinates: 35°48′S 137°18′E
- Area: 4,405 km^{2} (1,701 sq mi)
- Length: 145 km (90.1 mi)
- Width: 0.9–54 km (0.56–33.55 mi)
- Coastline: 540 km (336 mi)
- Highest elevation: 307 m (1007 ft)

Administration
- Australia
- State: South Australia
- LGA: Kangaroo Island Council
- Largest settlement: Kingscote (pop. 1962)

Demographics
- Population: 4,894 (2021)
- Pop. density: 1.07/km^{2} (2.77/sq mi)

Kangaroo Island (Kaurna: Karta Pintingga, lit. 'Island of the Dead'), known colloquially as KI, is Australia's third-largest island, after Tasmania and Melville Island. It lies in the state of South Australia, 112 km (70 mi) southwest of Adelaide. Its closest point to the mainland is Snapper Point in Backstairs Passage, which is 13.5 km (8.4 mi) from the Fleurieu Peninsula.

Receiving over 200,000 visitors annually, Kangaroo Island is one of Australia's most popular travel destinations, and was ranked as the second-best travel destination globally by Lonely Planet in 2024. The island has several nature reserves to protect the remnants of its natural vegetation and native animals, with the largest and best-known being Flinders Chase National Park at the western end. It is particularly known for the abundance of sea lions at Seal Bay, and for its population of little penguins.

The native population that once occupied the island (sometimes referred to as the Kartan people) disappeared from the archaeological record sometime after the land became an island following the rising sea levels associated with the Last Glacial Period around 10,000 years ago. It was subsequently settled intermittently by sealers and whalers in the early 19th century, and from 1836 on a permanent basis during the British colonisation of South Australia. Since then the island's economy has been principally agricultural, with a southern rock lobster fishery and with tourism growing in importance. The island is subject to bushfires in the summer, and had two particularly devastating fires in 2007 and 2019. The largest town, and the administrative centre, is Kingscote.

== Description ==
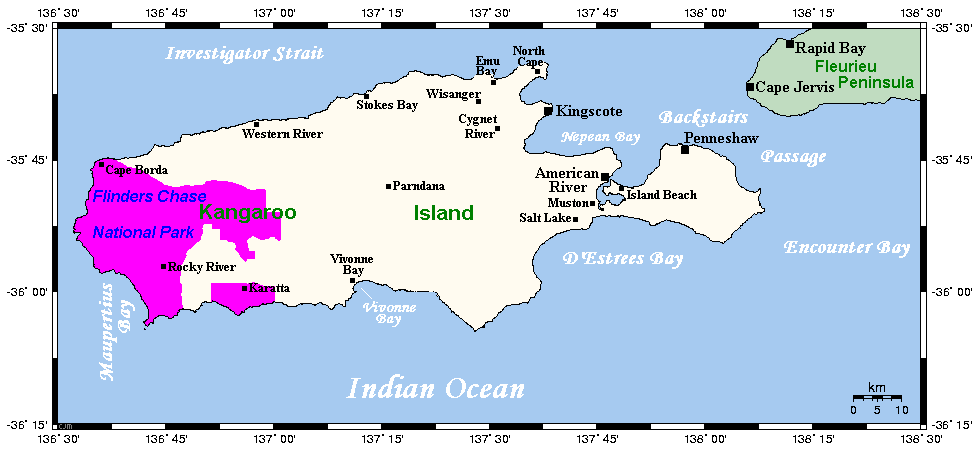
Kangaroo Island

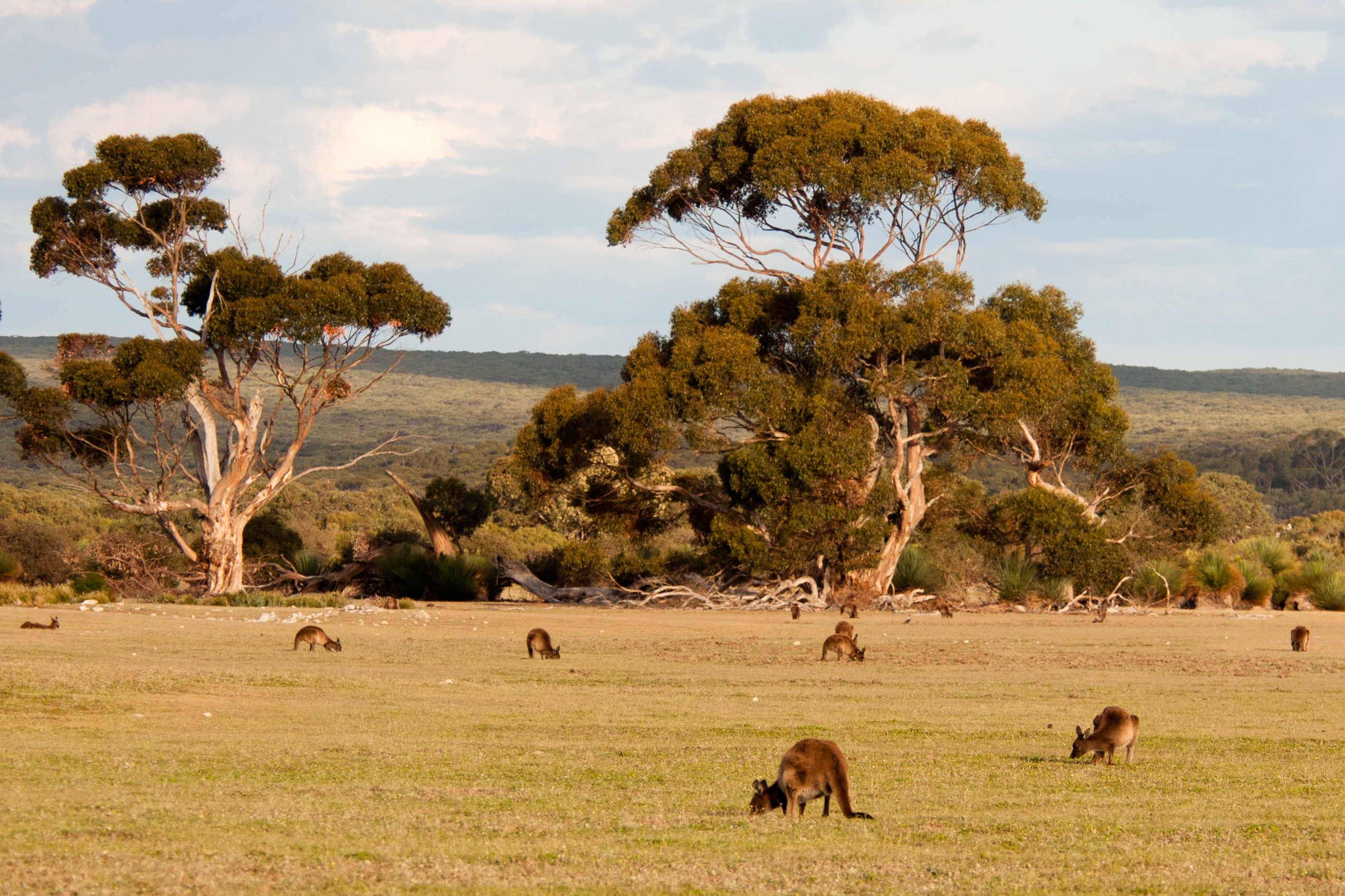
Open woodland with kangaroos

Kangaroo Island, colloquially known as "KI", is 145 kilometres (90 mi) long west/east and between 0.94 and 54 km (1 and 34 mi) from its narrowest to widest north/south points. Its area covers 4,405 km^{2} (1,701 sq mi). Its coastline is 540 km (336 mi) long, and its highest point of 307 m (1,007 ft) is in Flinders Chase National Park, west of the junction of the Playford and West End Highways. The second highest point is Mount MacDonnell at 299 m (981 ft) above sea level.

It is separated from Yorke Peninsula to the northwest by Investigator Strait and from Fleurieu Peninsula to the northeast by Backstairs Passage. A group of islets, the Pages, lie off the eastern end of the island.

== History ==
=== Aboriginal use and occupation ===
Kangaroo Island separated from mainland Australia around 10,000 years ago, due to rising sea level after the last glacial period. Known as (Karta) Pintingga ('Island of the Dead') by the mainland Aboriginal peoples, the existence of stone tools and shell middens shows that Aboriginal people once lived on Kangaroo Island. The people disappeared from the archaeological record sometime after the land became an island; it is thought that they occupied it as long ago as 16,000 years before the present and may have only disappeared from the island as recently as 2000 years ago. There is however evidence of the Kartan people on the mainland, for instance at Hallett Cove. A mainland Aboriginal dreaming story tells of the Backstairs Passage flooding:

Long ago, Ngurunderi's two wives ran away from him, and he was forced to follow them. He pursued them and as he did so he crossed Lake Albert and went along the beach to Cape Jervis. When he arrived there he saw his wives wading half-way across the shallow channel which divided Naroongowie from the mainland. He was determined to punish his wives, and angrily ordered the water to rise up and drown them. With a terrific rush the waters roared and the women were carried back towards the mainland. Although they tried frantically to swim against the tidal wave they were powerless to do so and were drowned.

=== European settlement ===
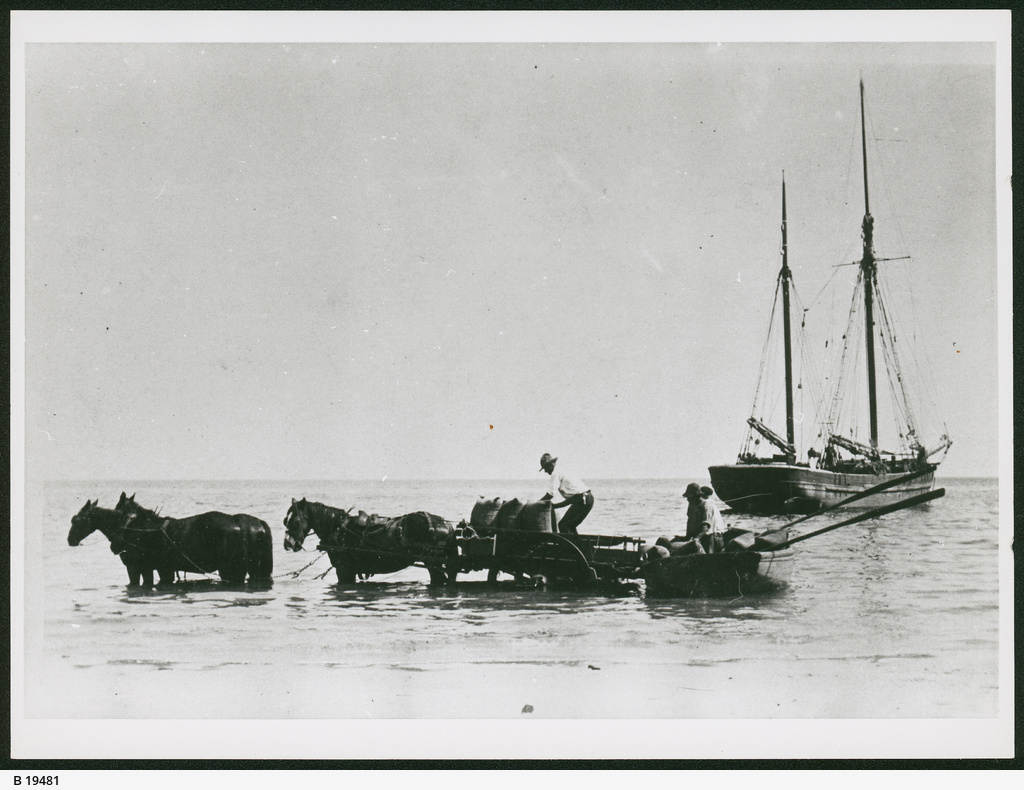
Loading grain from horsedrawn wagons to the ketch Free Selector

On 23 March 1802, British explorer Matthew Flinders, commanding HMS Investigator, named the land "Kanguroo (sic) Island", due to the endemic subspecies of the western grey kangaroo, Macropus fuliginosus fuliginosus, after landing near Kangaroo Head on the north coast of the Dudley Peninsula. He was closely followed by the French explorer Commander Nicolas Baudin, who was the first European to circumnavigate the Island and who mapped much of the island (which is why so many areas have French names).

Although the French and the British were at war at the time, the men met peacefully. They both used the fresh water seeping at what is now known as Hog Bay near Frenchman's Rock and the site of present-day Penneshaw. Baudin named the Island Île Borda, in honour of Jean-Charles de Borda, although the French chart published by Louis de Freycinet after Baudin's death referred to the Island as Île Decres.

A community of sealers and escaped convicts existed on Kangaroo Island from 1802 to the time of South Australia's colonisation in 1836. A sealing gang led by Joseph Murrrell are reported landing at Harvey's Return in 1806–07, and they established a camp on the beach. The sealers were rough men and several kidnapped Aboriginal women from Tasmania and mainland South Australia. The women were kept prisoner as wives and virtual slaves. At least two contemporary accounts (Taplin 1867, Bull 1884) report reputed crossings of Backstairs Passage from Kangaroo Island to the mainland by kidnapped women seeking to escape from their captors. "A fine specimen of her race" was pointed out to J. W. Bull as having swum the passage in 1835, and a woman and her baby were found dead on the beach after a presumed crossing in 1871. In 1803, sealers from the American brig Union built the schooner Independence, the first ship built in South Australia, at what is now American River.

In 1812, Richard Siddins reached Kangaroo Island on the Campbell Macquarie, which was engaged in salt harvesting on the island. When she was wrecked later that year, 30 tons of the mineral was recovered from her cargo. In 1819, a whaler named Henry Wallen established a farm near "Three Wells River" (later Cygnet River) and with the assistance of a later arrival, "Fireball" Bates, and a friend William Day, exerted his dominance over the island's rag-tag population, who deferentially referred to him as "King Wally".

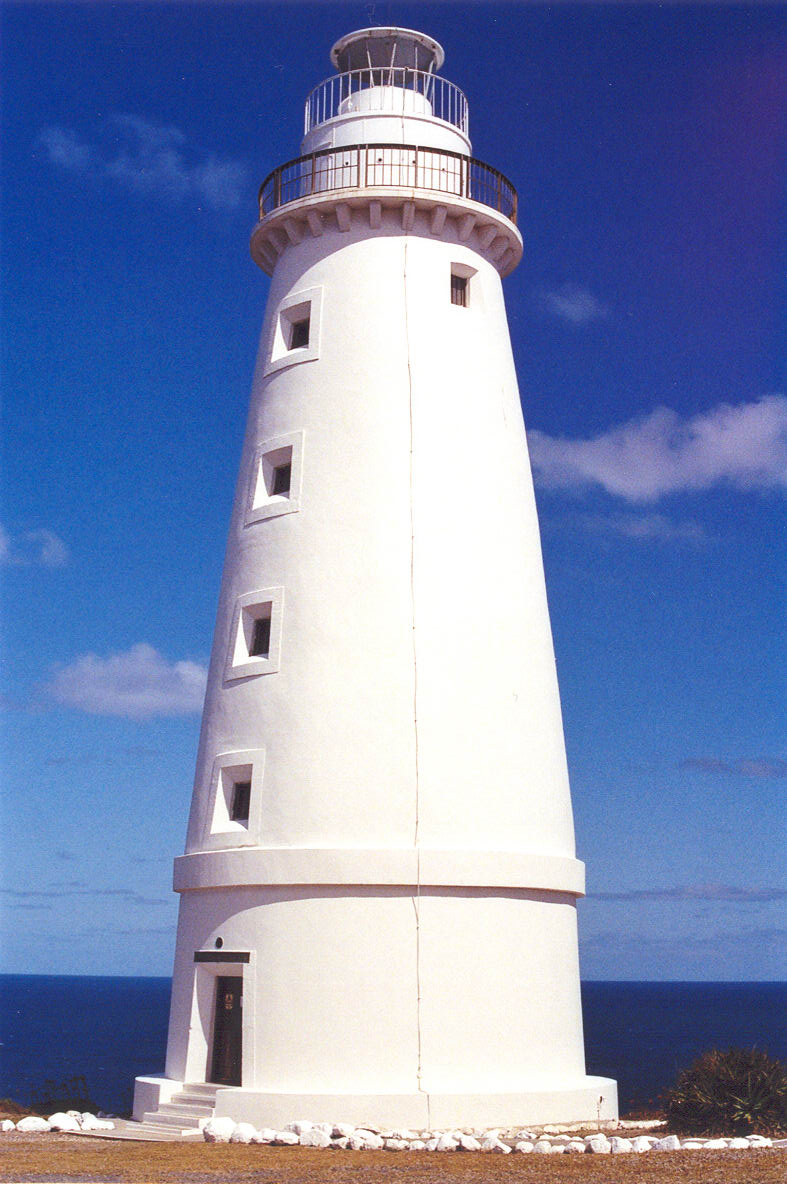
Cape Willoughby Lighthouse

Most ships of the "First Fleet of South Australia" that brought settlers for the new colony first stopped at Nepean Bay. The first was Duke of York commanded by Captain Robert Clark Morgan on 27 or 28 July 1836; Lady Mary Pelham, under Robert Ross, arrived a day or two later. The arrival of the Africaine, under John Finlay Duff, in November that year, was notable for the deaths of E. W. Osborne and Dr. John Slater, who perished on an exploratory trek from Cape Borda to Kingscote. Samuel Stephens, the colonial manager, was so impressed with Wallen's farm that he annexed it for the South Australian Company. A number of shore-based bay whaling stations operated on the coast in the 1840s. These were located at Doyle's Bay, D'Estrees Bay and Hog Bay.

=== Shipwrecks and lighthouses ===
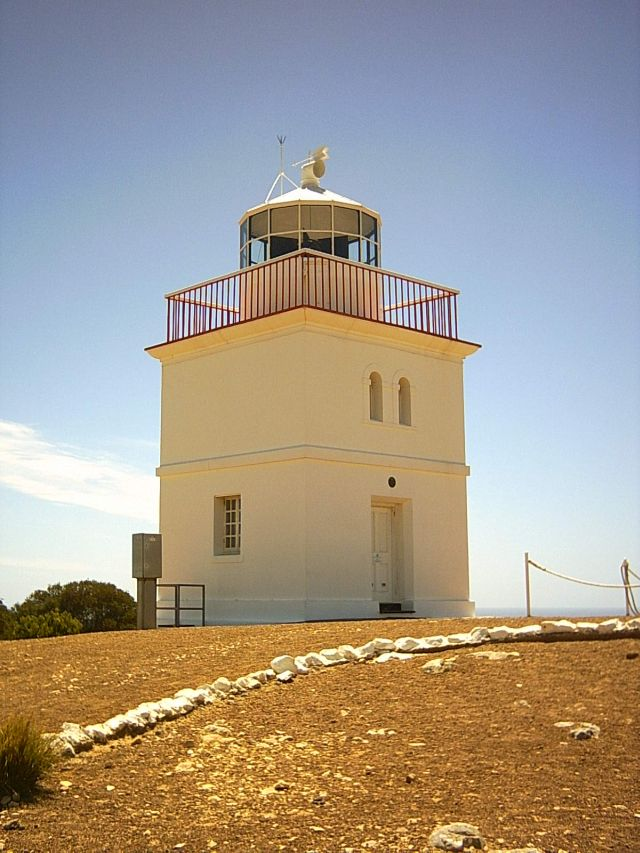
Cape Borda Lighthouse

Numerous ships have been wrecked on the Kangaroo Island coastline. The earliest was the cutter William (20 tons), which was wrecked while trying to enter Hog Bay on 23 August 1847. The largest vessel lost was Portland Maru (5,865 tons), which sank at Cape Torrens on 20 March 1935. The greatest loss of life occurred with the wreck of Loch Sloy on 24 April 1899 at Maupertuis Bay, when 31 people were drowned, and one initial survivor subsequently perished. Twenty-seven people drowned at West Bay in September 1905, when Loch Vennachar was wrecked.

The first lighthouse built was erected at Cape Willoughby in 1852; this was also the first lighthouse to be erected in South Australia. This was followed by the Cape Borda Lightstation in 1858, the Cape du Couedic Lighthouse in 1906 and Cape St Albans Lighthouse in 1908. All lighthouses continue to be operational.

== Geography and geology ==
Kangaroo Island has a rugged coastline. A network of limestone caves hidden beneath the surface, especially along the southern and western coasts of the island, are estimated to have formed between one and two million years ago. They were formed from shell fragments from the exposed seabed around this time, after the dunes hardened over time, and rainwater dissolved the soft limestone to create the caverns. Before the 2020 bushfires, 120 caves had been discovered. Speleologists who have been exploring the land devegetated by the fires had found a further 150 caves by December 2025. They have also found previously undocumented species living in the caves. Most of these caves are not open to the public, but Kelly's Hill Caves have been a tourist attraction since the early 20th century.

=== Fossils ===
Kangaroo Island
- Stratigraphic range: Cambrian Stage 4 ("Lower Cambrian")
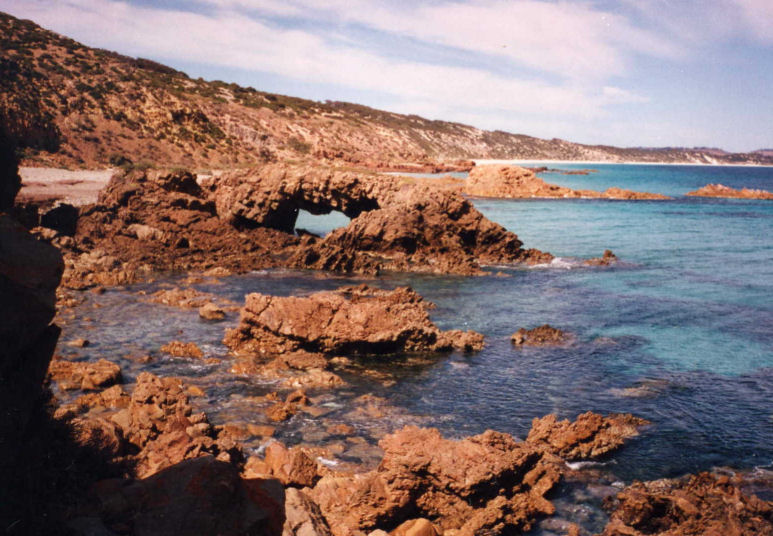
- North Coast of Kangaroo Island, Emu Bay
- Type: Geological formation

Lithology
- Primary: Shale

Location
- Coordinates: 35°35′S 137°30′E
- Region: The north coast of Kangaroo Island, around Emu Bay and Cape D'Estaing
- Country: South Australia, Australia.

The northern coast of Kangaroo Island contains important fossil-bearing deposits, dating from the late Lower Cambrian, such as the Emu Bay Shale (late Botomian, 517 million years old). A variety of primordial marine arthropods left their remains in this Burgess shale type preservation, but the larger grain size of the Emu Bay rock means that the quality of preservation is lower.

A few genera of non-biomineralized arthropods, among them Squamacula, Kangacaris, and the megacheiran Tanglangia, are known only from the Emu Bay Shale and Chengjiang. The site is also the source of specimens of trilobites such as Redlichia takooensis, Emuella polymera, Balcoracania dailyi, Megapharanaspis nedini, Holyoakia simpsoni, and Estaingia (=Hsuaspis) bilobata. Balcoracania and Emuella are the only known genera of the Redlichiina family Emuellidae, known for possessing the number of thoracic segments known for Trilobita as a whole (a record of 103 in one Balcoracania specimen), and so far entirely restricted to Australia and Antarctica.

The depositional environment of the majority of Burgess-Shale-type assemblages is outer shelf, deeper water. The Emu Bay Shale in contrast, appears to represent deposition in restricted basins on the inner shelf, indicating that soft tissue preservation occurred in a range of environmental settings during the Cambrian. Some Emu Bay fossils display extensive mineralization of soft tissues, most often of blocky apatite or fibrous calcium carbonate, including the oldest phosphatized muscle tissue – along with records from Sirius Passet in Greenland, the first thus far reported from the Cambrian. Mid-gut glands are preserved three-dimensionally in calcium phosphate in the arthropods Isoxys and Oestokerkus, as in related species from the Burgess Shale. Pleistocene fossilised footprints indicate extinct Australian megafauna, such as diprotodons, short faced kangaroos, and thylacines were once distributed on the island.

== Governance and population ==
The Kangaroo Island Council provides local government for the entire island and was formed in 1996, following amalgamation of the previous District Councils of Kingscote and Dudley. Kangaroo Island is in the federal Division of Mayo and in the state Electoral district of Mawson.

A 2005 enquiry into the financial sustainability of local government in South Australia determined that 26 out of 68 councils in South Australia were considered unsustainable in the long term. Among these was Kangaroo Island Council, due to its large land area, extensive road network, low population and high tourism visitation. A long term financial plan adopted by council included a rate increase of 2% above CPI for the ten years from 2010. On 13 May 2010, a development plan was authorised, representing a comprehensive review of Kangaroo Island's planning regulations.

=== Settlements ===
The biggest town on Kangaroo Island is Kingscote. Originally established at Reeves Point on 27 July 1836, it is South Australia's first colonial settlement. It was later suggested that Kingscote could serve as the capital of South Australia, but the island's resources were insufficient to support such a large community, so the settlement of Adelaide was chosen.

There are several smaller towns on the island. Penneshaw, the second largest town on Kangaroo Island, has a population of around 300 and is located on the north eastern tip of the Dudley Peninsula, on the eastern end of the island. It contains the ferry terminal, which brings most of the visitors to the island, along with all the necessary freight to sustain the local population. Parndana, in the centre of the island, has a population of about 150, but most do not live in the town; they are sprawled within a few kilometres. The historic area to the south-east of the township, known as the Research Centre to locals, was home to the research station that was set up in the 1940s and 1950s to research the viability of agriculture in the area and still has a small settlement of about 20 people.

American River, on the east coast between Kingscote and Penneshaw, has about 300 residents. Penneshaw and Parndana each have basic facilities, including a general store and fuel, and are home to hotels. Facilities such as banking and large supermarkets are available in Kingscote and Penneshaw.

=== Demographics ===
At the 2021 census, the island had a population of 4,894. Population growth has slowed in past years, with the attraction of mainland Australia for younger adults being the key factor. Censuses show the number of residents aged 55 and over increased from 24.1% in 2001 to 29.8% in 2006, 34.9% in 2011, 41% in 2016, and 43.5% in 2021.

== Economy ==
=== Agriculture ===
The economy is mostly agricultural (grapes, honey, wool, meat and grain). Traditionally, sheep grazing has been the key element in agriculture on the Island; however, in recent times, more diverse crops, such as potatoes and canola, have been introduced. Cattle farming has grown as well, with good quality beef cattle being raised in the higher rainfall areas. Tourism and fishing also play significant roles, with the island experiencing over 186,000 visitors per annum, and some of the best southern rock lobster being sourced from the island's rugged south coast. Kangaroo Island has South Australia's only eucalyptus oil distillery, with oil distilled from the endemic Kangaroo Island narrow leaf mallee. The future of over 19,000 hectares, which had been planted (or were due to be planted) with blue gum for future harvesting, is now in doubt, following the collapse of Great Southern Plantation Ltd. in May 2009.

=== Wine industry ===
The island has 30 wine growers and 12 wineries. The first vineyard was planted near Eastern Cove in 1976 and the first wine made in 1982. This was blended with Tolleys Barossa wine and sold from the cellar door of Eastern Cove Wine as KI-Barossa blend. The Florance vineyard was established under supervision of B. Hayes, who produced its first wine – Eastern Cove Cygnet – and introduced it at the University of South Australia in 1990. The wine carried a Kangaroo Island appellation label as first wine 100% of the region.

=== Ligurian bees ===
Kangaroo Island is noted for its honey and its Ligurian honey bees. The island has the world's only pure-bred and disease-free population of this type of bee. The exporting of pure-bred queen bees is a notable industry for the island. For this reason, there are significant quarantine restrictions on bringing bee products and bee-handling equipment onto the island. It is the world's oldest bee sanctuary.

The Advertiser, 24 December 1883, reported "A few weeks since the Chamber of Manufactures forwarded an order to Mr. Carroll, a bee master, near Brisbane, for a swarm of Ligurian bees." The American Bee Journal, 25 November 1885, stated "Several pure colonies were reared from this one, [the first hive from Queensland] and two of them were sent to Kangaroo Island, where they appear to thrive well." An almost word perfect report in the British Bee Journal, 1 November 1885, added: "They came from the apiary of Mr. Chas. Fullwood."

A. E. Bonney quickly commenced queen bee breeding near Adelaide at his Upper Kensington apiary in January 1884. In the South Australian Advertiser, 7 March 1884, Bonney stated "About three weeks ago I divided the original colony, and the Chamber of Manufactures now possesses three good swarms of Ligurians; two of these will probably be ready to send out towards the end of the month." And on 9 May 1884 "To show that I think highly of the Ligurians, I may say that in March I imported two more colonies from Queensland. ... During Easter holidays Mr Justice Boucaut took one queen [bred and mated in Adelaide] in a full colony to Mr Buick, of American River, Kangaroo Island." From the South Australian Advertiser, 1 August 1884 "On June 25 the original hive of Ligurian bees, imported by the chamber from Queensland, was sent safely to Mr Turner, at Smith's Bay, Kangaroo Island."

In September 2025, authorities became concerned about the varroa destructor parasite, capable of wiping out hives of bees, had been found on mainland SA for the first time, after having previously been found in New South Wales, Victoria, Queensland, and the ACT.. Extra biosecurity measures have been put in place, including the placement of sentinel beehives and extra checks on passengers arriving by ferry.

=== Tourism and recreation ===
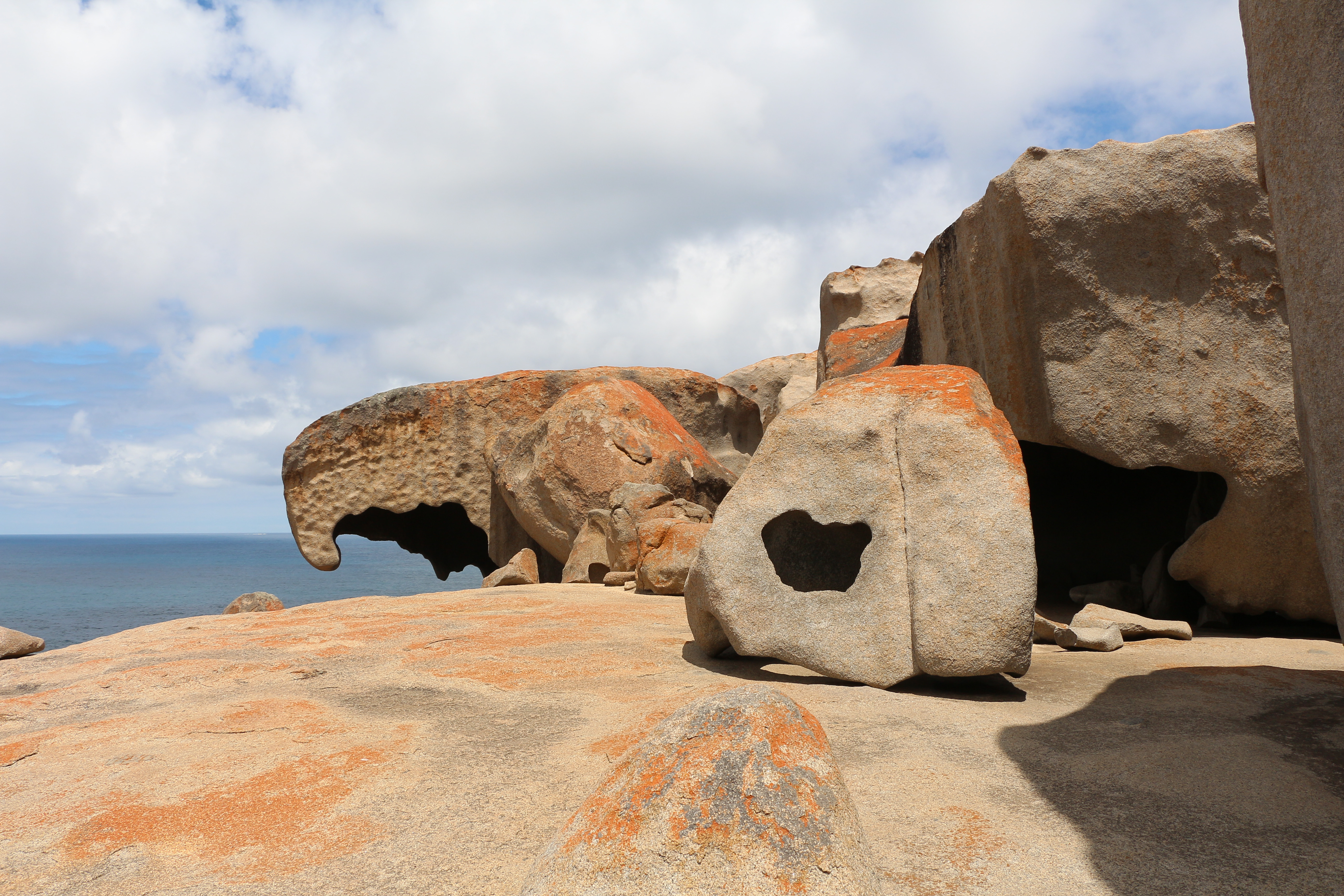
Remarkable Rocks

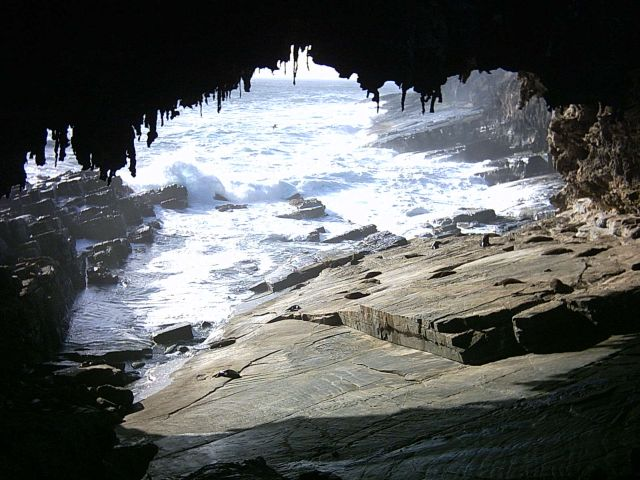
Admiral's Arch

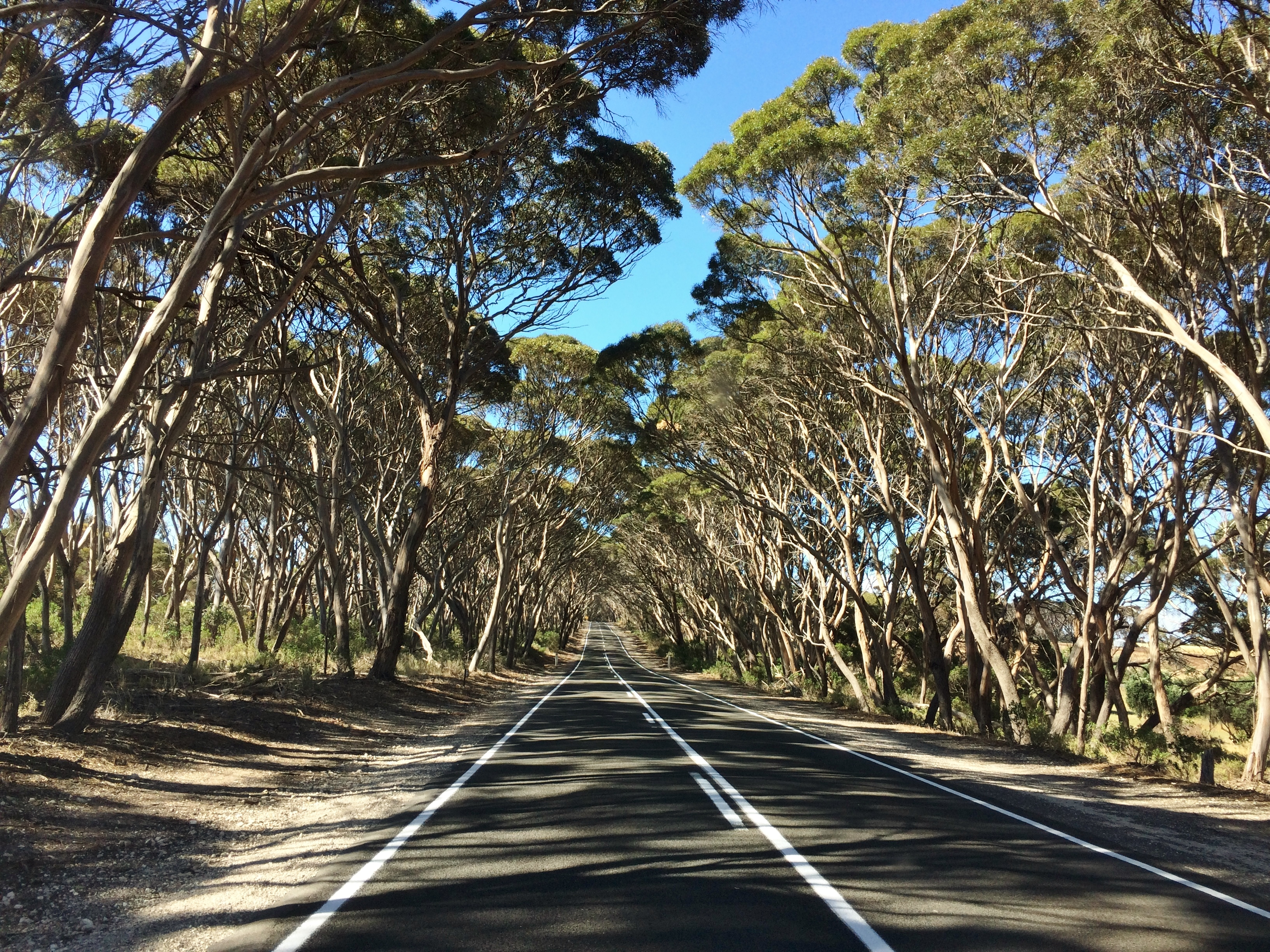
Eucalyptus cneorifolia along Cape Willoughby Road, Kangaroo Island

Kangaroo Island is one of South Australia's most popular tourist attractions, attracting over 140,000 visitors each year, with international visitors, primarily from Europe, accounting for more than 25% of these visits. There were 114 businesses operating in the sector in June 2016 and the visitor expenditure reached $123 million in December 2017. The expenditure is expected to reach the mark of $168 million by December 2020. Some of the most popular tourist spots are:

- Seal Bay Conservation Park with ranger guided walks among basking Australian sea lions.
- Flinders Chase National Park which includes Remarkable Rocks, Admiral's Arch, lighthouses at Cape Borda and Cape du Couedic, and multiple walking trails and camping areas.
- Cape Willoughby
- Kelly Hill Caves

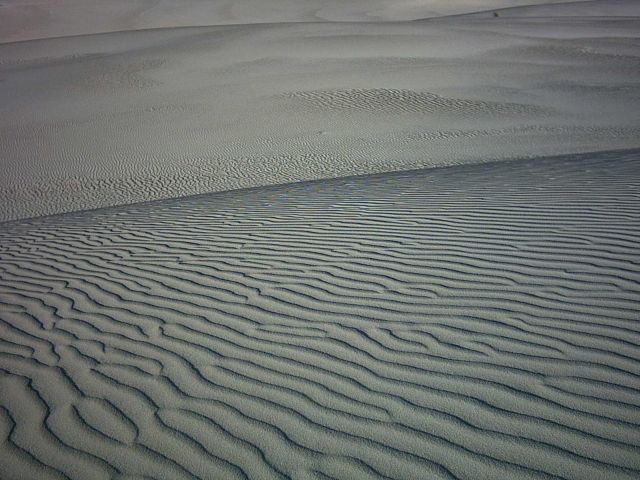
Little Sahara

- Little Sahara, huge sand dunes on the south coast.
- The lookout Mount Thisby (officially designated Prospect Hill in 2002 to honour Matthew Flinders' original naming) with a 360-degree view around the island.
- Murray Lagoon with its abundant aquatic bird life.
- The Kangaroo Island Wildlife Park at Duncan includes local wildlife like koalas, kangaroos, little penguins and reptiles, but also animals such as brown capuchin monkeys, common marmosets, dingoes, meerkats and serval.
- Kangaroo Island Penguin Centre (formerly Kangaroo Island Marine Centre) at Kingscote is now closed but a local tour operator, Kangaroo Island Hire a Guide, is still organising nocturnal tours from Kingscote.
- Raptor Domain (In-flight bird of prey presentation and reptile show)
- The Hanson Bay Wildlife Sanctuary koala walk and Nocturnal tour offer visitors a chance to see the local wildlife.
- A number of farms that sell honey from the Ligurian bees
- The Emu Ridge Eucalyptus Oil Distillery which manufactures eucalyptus oil using a very old furnace

Kangaroo Island is also considered to be one of South Australia's best locations for scuba diving, with many popular locations along the north coast. Many of South Australia's iconic marine species can be seen there, including the Leafy seadragon. Penneshaw jetty is known for its Gorgonian corals and there are many other timber jetties and shipwrecks that can be dived and enjoyed around the island.

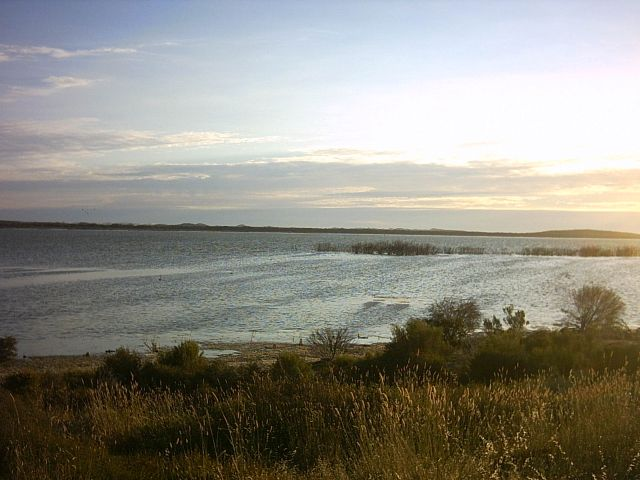
Murray Lagoon

Safe swimming is possible on the northern beaches, such as Emu Bay, Stokes Bay, or Snellings Beach, and at Island Beach on the Dudley Peninsula. The south coast has dangerous undertows and is more suitable for stronger and experienced swimmers only. An ocean pool with easy shore and pontoon access exists at Kingscote and is free to use. The island is home to the Kangaroo Island Football League and has several other organised sporting competitions.

== Flora and fauna ==
The Kangaroo Island kangaroo, Rosenberg's sand goanna, southern brown bandicoot, tammar wallaby, common brushtail possum, short-beaked echidna, Australian sea lion, and long-nosed fur seal are native to the island, as well as six bat and frog species. The sole endemic vertebrate species is a small marsupial carnivore, the Kangaroo Island dunnart.

The koala, common ringtail possum, and platypus have been introduced and still survive there. The introduced koalas have flourished, to the degree that their preferred food source, the manna gum, is at risk of local extinction. The idea of a cull of the burgeoning koala numbers is distasteful to the public, and the state government prefers to use sterilisation for population control. Although chlamydophila pneumoniae is widespread in most koala populations, the disease is not present on Kangaroo Island due to its isolation from other colonies.

=== Birds ===
An endemic species of emu, the Kangaroo Island emu, became extinct between 1802 and 1836. The island is the last South Australian refuge of an endangered subspecies of the glossy black cockatoo (Calyptorhynchus lathami halmaturinus).

==== KI Important Bird Area ====
Kangaroo Island has been identified by BirdLife International as an Important Bird Area (IBA) because it supports populations of the vulnerable fairy tern, the near threatened bush stone-curlew, hooded plover and western whipbird, and the biome-restricted rock parrot and purple-gaped honeyeater. It also supports over 1% of the world populations of Cape Barren geese, black-faced cormorants, Pacific gulls and pied oystercatchers, and sometimes of musk ducks, blue-billed ducks, freckled ducks, Australian shelducks, chestnut teals and banded stilts.

==== Little penguin colonies ====
Little penguin colonies at Penneshaw and Kingscote can be accessed by joining guided nocturnal tours. Both colonies are currently in decline. Several colonies elsewhere on the island are believed to now be extinct, or contain only 'a few' birds. Historic colonies on Kangaroo Island include Cape Gantheaume, Ravine des Casoars and Harvey's Return. In 1950 and 1972, author Mervinia Masterman claimed that little penguins could be found at Flinders Chase in "thousands". She described the population utilising the limestone caves at Ravine de Casoars as "innumerable" and described watching "dozens" come ashore at Sandy Beach. Penguins were also present at Hanson Bay on the island's south coast in the 1950s. The decline of penguin populations has prompted expanded monitoring regimes from 2011 to the present. The 2013 Kangaroo Island little penguin census revealed that numbers had decreased by 44 to 100 percent at all surveyed colonies over the prior two years. The census included eight survey sites.

== Conservation ==
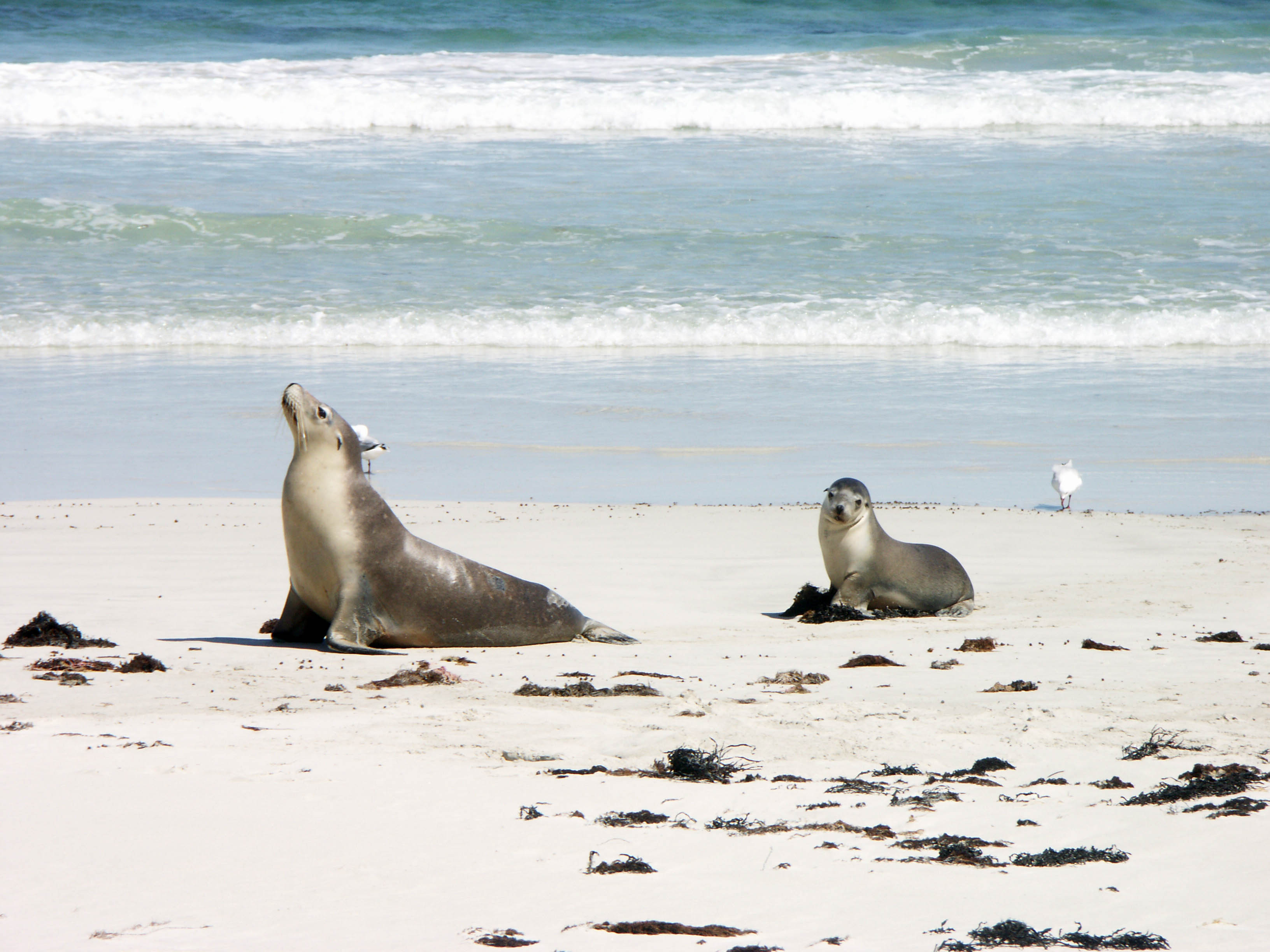
Seal Bay's Australian sea lions

Nearly half of the island has never been cleared of vegetation, and a quarter of it is conserved in National Parks, Conservation Parks, and five Wilderness Protection Areas. The main protected areas are:

- Flinders Chase National Park
- Seal Bay Conservation Park
- Cape Gantheaume Conservation Park
- Cape Bouguer Wilderness Protection Area
- Ravine des Casoars Wilderness Protection Area

Because of its isolation from mainland Australia, foxes and rabbits are absent from and prohibited from entering the island. Feral cats are a major threat to endangered endemic native fauna, including the Kangaroo Island dunnart, the Kangaroo Island echidna, and the Southern brown bandicoot. And also, because of their ability to spread livestock diseases such as Sarcocystis and Toxoplasmosis, a program to eradicate an estimated population of between 3,000 and 5,000 cats within 15 years was started in 2016. Then mayor Peter Clements said: "We have to reach a point where we don't have any cats on this island. The feral cat is an apex predator. It is ruining our species here on the island and we are totally committed to eliminating all cats." Registration and microchipping of cats is mandatory.

=== Conservation vs development ===
Conservation interests have come into conflict with proponents of various development proposals made since the 2000s. These include a helipad in the island's south-western wilderness; a southern bluefin tuna pen on the north coast of the island, which resulted in the withdrawal of the proposal; The Cliffs Golf Resort near Pennington Bay, for which Crown land was considered for private sale or lease to developers; and a port proposal at Smith Bay to facilitate timber exports, as well as cruise ship visitation.

== Electricity supply ==
Kangaroo Island is connected to the main South Australian power grid by a pair of 33 kV subsea cables across Backstairs Passage. The original 30-year-old 10,000 kVA cable was retained when the second cable, with double its capacity, was laid in 2018 at a cost of $45 million.

Before the new cable was commissioned, University of Technology Sydney conducted a study to assess the viability of renewable energy technology being used to independently generate the island's power with a combination of wind, solar and biomass. Although the study concluded that it was indeed possible for the island to sustainably produce its own power for around the same price as the new cable, SA Power Networks ultimately decided against the idea. The Kangaroo Island power station has three 2 MWe Caterpillar 3516B diesel generators capable of providing a combined 6 MW through the Kingscote substation to provide stability of supply if the submarine cables are unavailable.

== Transport ==
=== Sea transport ===
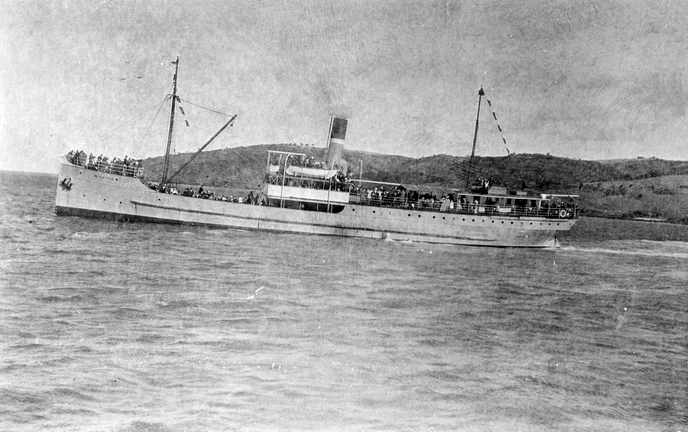
Karatta leaving Hog Bay

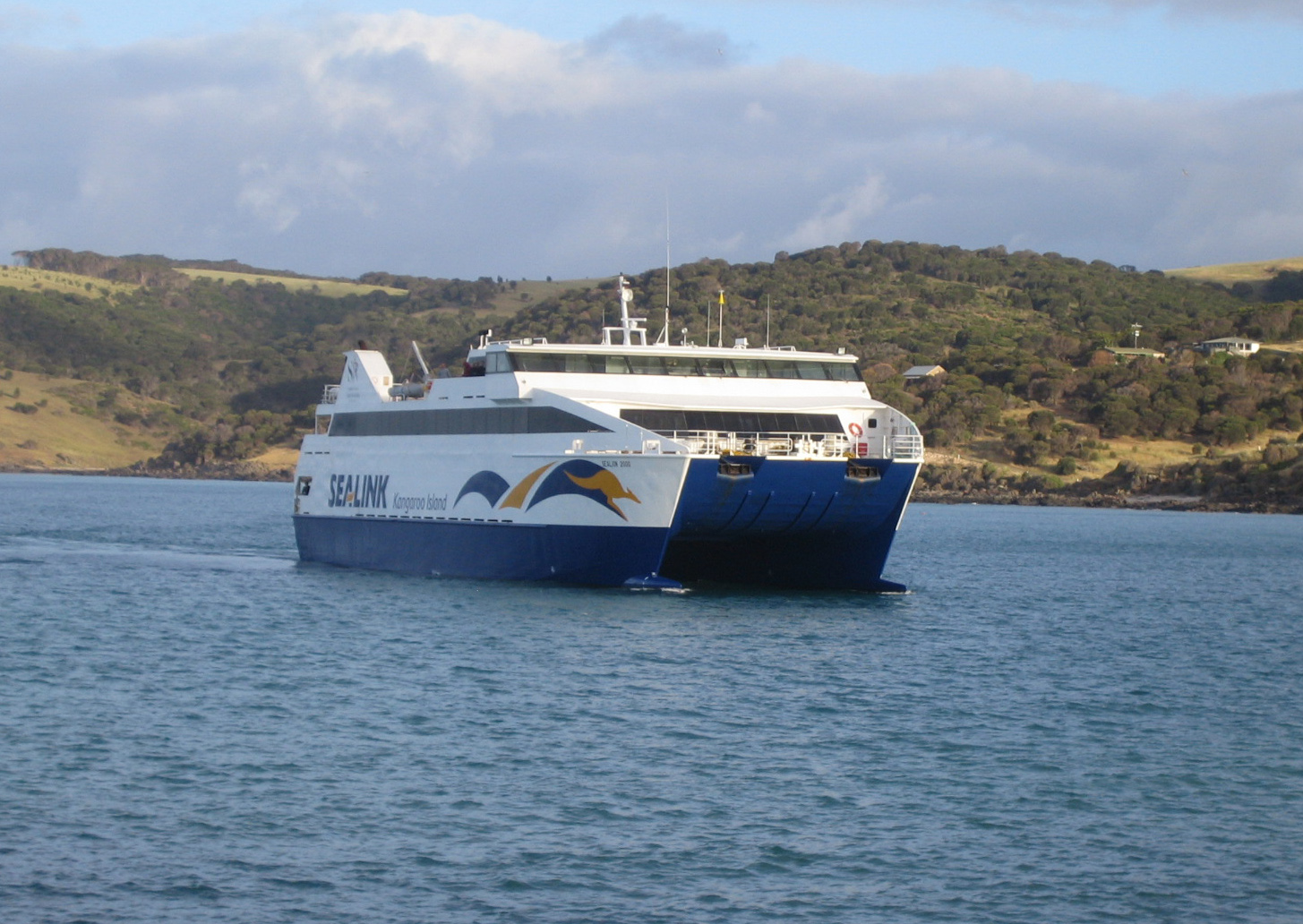
Sealion 2000 arriving at Penneshaw

Kangaroo Island is reliant on ferry services for the majority of its transport to and from the mainland. Ferry services are currently provided by Kangaroo Island SeaLink which uses two ferries, the Sealion 2000 and the Spirit of Kangaroo Island, to provide freight and passenger services.

From 1907 to 1961, Karatta was the prime freight and passenger vessel operating between Port Adelaide and Kingscote. Following withdrawal from service of Karatta, RW Miller operated the MV Troubridge, in later years as a joint venture with the South Australian Government. Troubridge was a roll on, roll off vessel of 1,996 tons, which used specially designed loading gantries at Port Adelaide, Port Lincoln and Kingscote.

Troubridge operated until 1 June 1987, when it was replaced by the government run $23 million Island Seaway. Built locally in Port Adelaide by Eglo Engineering, Island Seaway used the same loading platforms as Troubridge. Island Seaway was severely criticised as being unsuitable for the Backstairs Passage crossing. Seventy-five sheep and cattle died on the inaugural trip due to carbon monoxide poisoning, and the ship was once described as 'steering like a shopping trolley'. The vessel subsequently underwent a A$1 million refit of its propulsion system in September 1989 which improved its reliability.

Island Seaway began to experience competition from Kangaroo Island SeaLink which began services from Cape Jervis to Penneshaw in 1989. SeaLink acquired the ferry service originally introduced by Peter March. His "Philanderer Ferries" pioneered the crossing from Cape Jervis to Penneshaw, with Philanderer 3 being a passenger and vehicle carrying catamaran style vessel. In the 1980s, two passenger only services, Hydroflite H33, and Islander, operated for a short time from Glenelg to Kingscote.

SeaLink has outlasted several competing companies since it began operations. Boat Torque, a Western Australian company, operated Superflyte from 1994 until 1997, sailing from Glenelg to Kingscote. Kangaroo Island Ferries had a short-lived venture with SeaWay, which travelled from Wirrina Cove to Kingscote from September 2004 until February 2005. SeaWay could not handle rough weather as well as SeaLink vessels which impacted the service's reliability. Under different proprietorship, SeaWay recommenced services in August 2007. However, in May 2008, the operator of SeaWay announced suspension of services until October 2008, citing increased fuel prices. In June 2008 the SeaWay's operating company was placed in administration and the vessel advertised for sale.

With the introduction by SeaLink of the Island Navigator, the fate of Island Seaway was sealed, with the service subsequently withdrawn and SeaLink drawing on Government subsidies to operate all freight services to and from the Island. SeaLink now holds a virtual monopoly on sea transport to Kangaroo Island, primarily due to its long term lease of the Cape Jervis berth. Sealink's agreement with the SA Government, expiring in 2024, precludes other operators from using the Cape Jervis facility for one hour before, and one hour after any scheduled SeaLink service. Kangaroo Island residents have expressed displeasure with the exclusive arrangement granted to SeaLink.

=== Air transport ===
Guinea Airways operated the first commercial service to Kangaroo Island, commencing in the 1930s. In 1959, the airline was acquired by Airlines of South Australia (ASA), a subsidiary of Ansett Transport Industries. The airline's final service was on 4 April 1986. ASA primarily operated Convairs, Douglas DC-3 and Fokker F-27 aircraft. A Piaggio P.166 was used infrequently in the 1970s, whilst Rossair operated Cessna 402s in an arrangement with ASA to replace the F27s in off-peak times. Following the withdrawal of ASA, Kendell Airlines (another Ansett subsidiary), operated 19-seat Fairchild Metroliners and 34-seat Saab aircraft to the island. Upon Ansett's ultimate demise in 2002, Rex Airlines acquired the Kendell aircraft and continued services to Kingscote Airport until early 2020, when it ceased operation citing competition from Qantas.

In competition with the larger aircraft, and generally with more flexible timetables, a succession of smaller airlines from the 1970s tried with varying success to maintain a 'second string' presence. Island Air and Pagas operated briefly in the 1970s, whilst the most successful, Emu Airways, commenced in 1980 and made its final flight in November 2005. Emu flew Piper Chieftain aircraft to Kingscote, American River, Penneshaw and Parndana, before air regulations dictated abandonment of all airstrips except Kingscote. Air Kangaroo Island (formerly Air Transit), flew Cessna 402s to the Island in the 1990s.

From 1986 to 1990, Lloyd Aviation operated Embraer EMB 110 Bandeirante aircraft, before flying the Short 330. For several years in the 1980s, Commodore Airlines (eventually becoming State Air) offered another alternative service. QantasLink briefly operated a service after the demise of Emu Airways, commencing 18 December 2005, but withdrew less than six months later. QantasLink also operated direct flights from Kangaroo Island to Melbourne, the first time the route was operated. In January 2007, Air South commenced four services daily using Titan nine seat aircraft, but ceased flights in October 2009.

In June 2017, Qantas announced direct Qantaslink flights to Kangaroo Island from Adelaide and Melbourne from December 2017, offering five flights a week from Adelaide over the peak summer months, reducing to three flights a week after Easter, and two flights a week from Melbourne over the peak tourist season in December and January. An $18 million upgrade of the Kingscote Airport was completed in May 2018.

Currently as at July 2026 Qantas operates daily flights year round and twice daily in peak season offering the most cost effective way for interstate and international tourist to get to and from the island if they are not self driving.

=== Rail transport ===
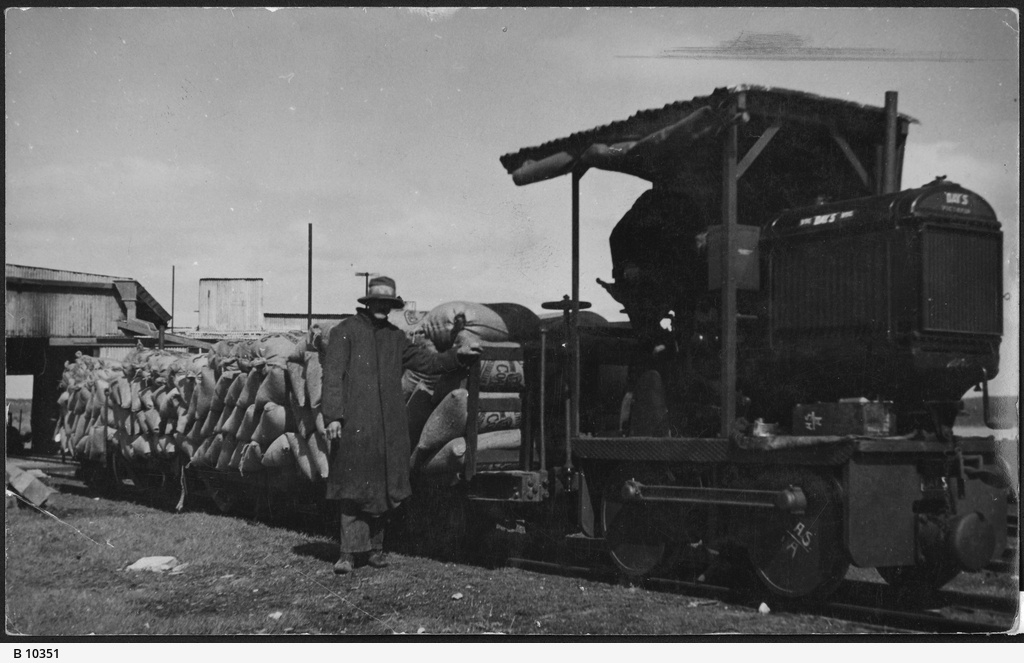
Salt railway on Kangaroo Island

Around 1938, the Salt Company on Kangaroo Island used a rail tractor built by W. Day & Sons of South Melbourne to transport salt on a short narrow gauge railway between its factory and the port in Muston. Salt was obtained from Muston Lake, White Lagoon, Salt Lagoon and smaller lagoons near Kingscote. It was sold to domestic and industrial users, e.g. for fish and meat preservation and tanning. The salt exports from Kangaroo Island to Adelaide rose from 13 tons in 1843 to 20,000 tons in 1913. Plans for further railway lines did not pass the planning stage.

== Climate ==
Having a warm-summer Mediterranean climate (Csb), the winters between June and September are mild and wet, the summers usually warm and dry. Tempered by the ocean, particularly on the coastline, maximum temperatures in summer rarely exceed 35 °C (95 °F). Average temperatures in August range between 13 and 16 °C (55 and 61 °F) and in February, the hottest month, between 20 and 25 °C (68 and 77 °F). Between May and September the island receives two-thirds of its annual rainfall, varying from 450 millimetres (18 in) in Kingscote to around 900 millimetres (35 in) near Roo Lagoon on the top of the central plateau. The wettest month is July.

Climate data for Kingscote Airport, Cygnet River, Kangaroo Island
Month	Jan	Feb	Mar	Apr	May	Jun	Jul	Aug	Sep	Oct	Nov	Dec	Year
Record high °C (°F)	43.8 (110.8)	43.8 (110.8)	39.9 (103.8)	33.9 (93.0)	27.1 (80.8)	22.4 (72.3)	24.0 (75.2)	25.0 (77.0)	27.8 (82.0)	33.8 (92.8)	38.8 (101.8)	43.0 (109.4)	43.8 (110.8)
Mean daily maximum °C (°F)	26.6 (79.9)	26.6 (79.9)	24.5 (76.1)	21.6 (70.9)	18.6 (65.5)	16.1 (61.0)	15.4 (59.7)	16.1 (61.0)	18.0 (64.4)	20.1 (68.2)	23.0 (73.4)	24.8 (76.6)	21.0 (69.8)
Mean daily minimum °C (°F)	13.2 (55.8)	13.6 (56.5)	11.1 (52.0)	8.7 (47.7)	7.9 (46.2)	6.8 (44.2)	6.0 (42.8)	5.7 (42.3)	6.5 (43.7)	7.1 (44.8)	9.6 (49.3)	10.9 (51.6)	8.9 (48.0)
Record low °C (°F)	3.1 (37.6)	5.3 (41.5)	−0.4 (31.3)	−1.0 (30.2)	−0.6 (30.9)	−2.4 (27.7)	−2.1 (28.2)	−1.9 (28.6)	−2.0 (28.4)	−2.0 (28.4)	0.4 (32.7)	1.0 (33.8)	−2.4 (27.7)
Average precipitation mm (inches)	14.4 (0.57)	16.2 (0.64)	25.8 (1.02)	27.1 (1.07)	46.9 (1.85)	67.2 (2.65)	66.0 (2.60)	56.3 (2.22)	45.0 (1.77)	30.0 (1.18)	22.0 (0.87)	19.3 (0.76)	436.4 (17.18)
Average precipitation days (≥ 0.2 mm)	4.1	3.7	6.4	8.9	15.0	18.2	19.4	19.0	15.5	10.1	7.9	7.2	159.4
Source: Bureau of Meteorology

== Fires ==
=== 2007 bushfires ===
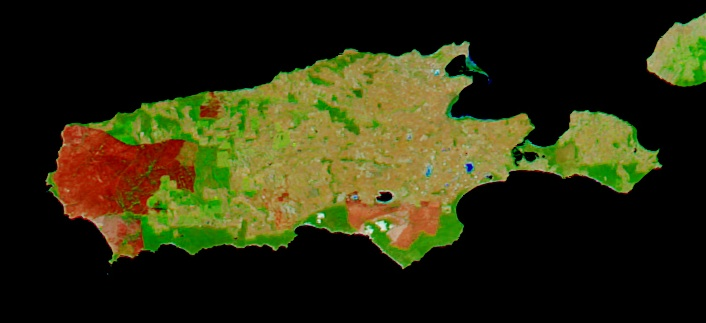
Burn scars from 2007 show red in this false-colour satellite image

Lightning strikes on Thursday 6 December 2007 caused several fires on the Island. Before being contained on 16 December 2007, over 20% of the Island had been burnt, totaling 900 square kilometres (220,000 acres), principally within National Park and Conservation Reserves. The most serious outbreak occurred in Flinders Chase National Park, with 630 square kilometres (or 85% of the total park area) having been burnt.

=== 2020 bushfires ===
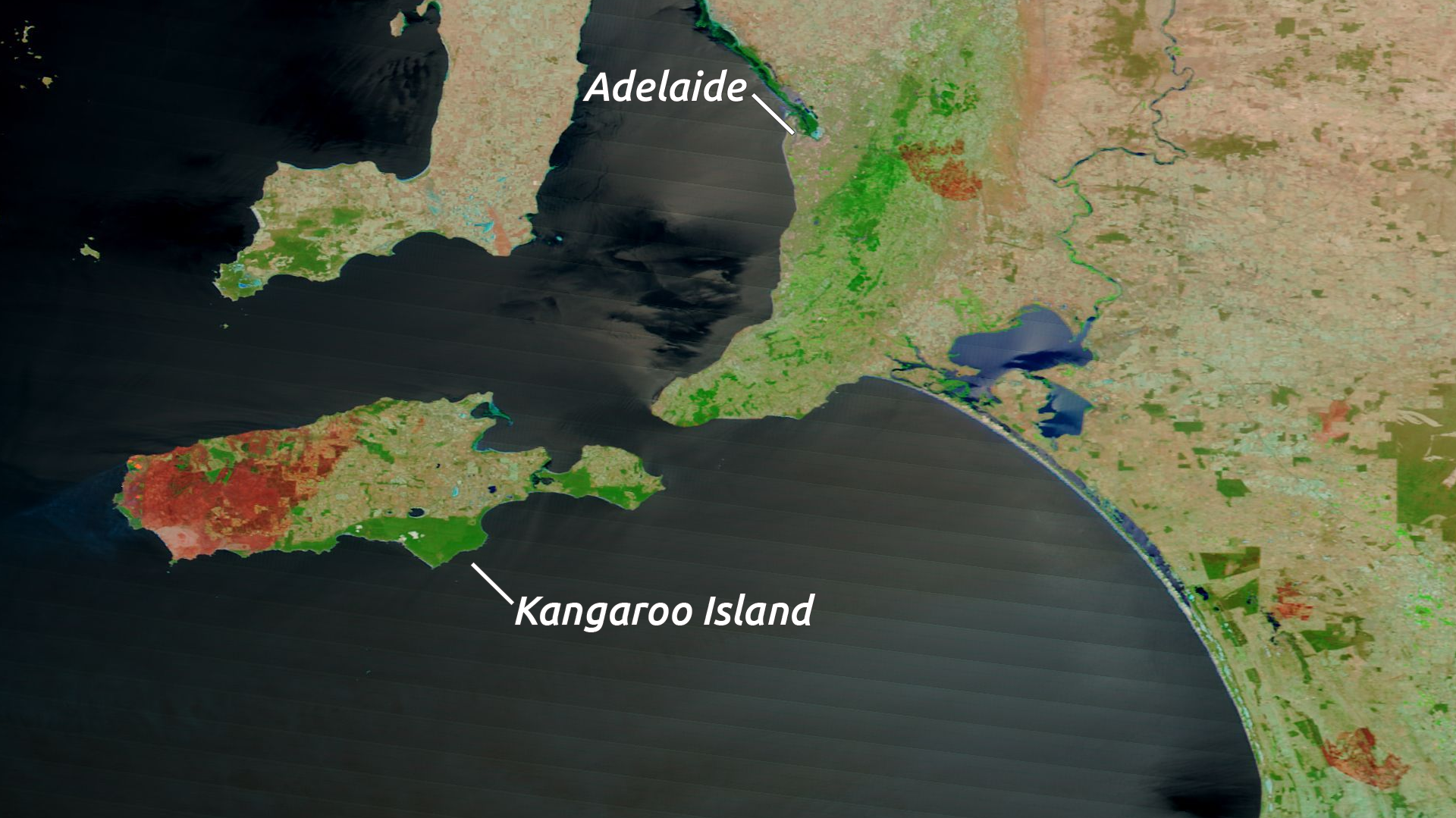
False colour imagery from Terra satellite showing burnt area from 2019–20 bushfire season

In January 2020, the island was one of many places nationwide affected by bushfire as part of the 2019–2020 Australian bushfire season. Across Kangaroo Island, several fires burnt in excess of 2,100 square kilometres (520,000 acres), about 52 percent of the island. A bushfire emergency warning was issued on 3 January 2020 as the fire advanced towards Vivonne Bay, and the town of Parndana was evacuated. The fires were not declared contained until 21 January.

Two people died on Kangaroo Island due to the fires. A number of wildlife species, some unique to Kangaroo Island and some already endangered before the 2019–2020 bushfires, might be facing extinction in the wild as a result of the fires. An estimated 80% of the 50,000 koalas on the island died in the fires. The Flinders Chase National Park was again damaged in the 2019–20 Australian bushfire season.

== In film ==
The 2024 drama feature film Kangaroo Island, directed by Tim Piper/Timothy David and written by his wife Sally Gifford, was filmed on the island. It had its world premiere on the closing night of the 2024 Adelaide Film Festival on 3 November 2024.

== See also ==
- Proclamation Day
- List of islands of Australia
- Western Kangaroo Island Commonwealth Marine Reserve
- Southern Kangaroo Island Commonwealth Marine Reserve
