= R. W. Miller =

Australian company

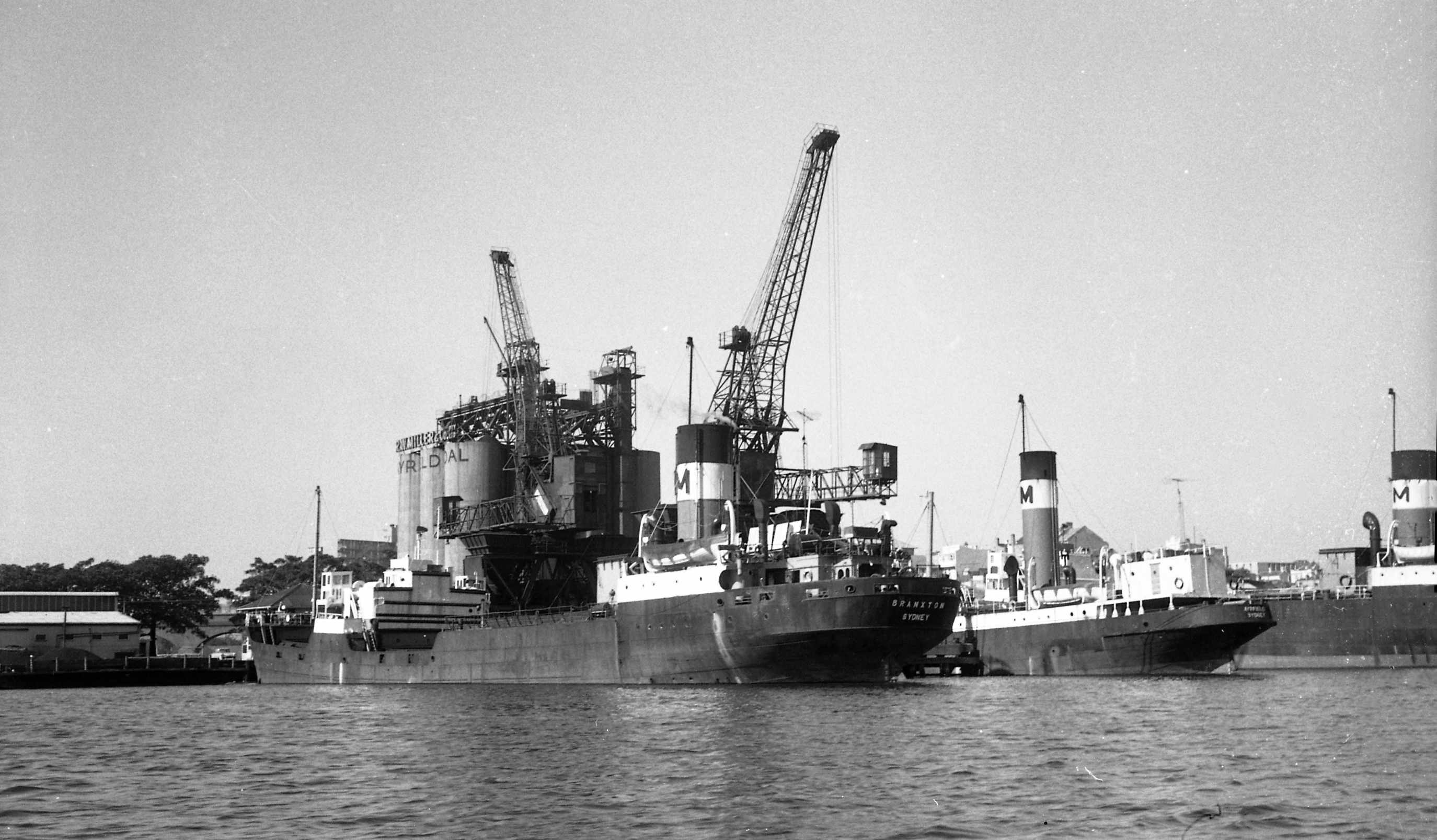
- Port facility and ships of R.W. Miller at Blackwattle Bay in 1968
- Industry: Coal mining Pubs; Shipping
- Founded: 1923
- Headquarters: Sydney, Australia
- Area served: Australia

R. W. Miller was an Australian company that had interests in coal mining, pubs and shipping. The company was named after its founder Robert William Miller (1879-1958).

== History ==
R. W. Miller was founded in 1923 as a colliery proprietor and coal dealer. It became involved in the coastal coal-carrying trade of New South Wales to convey coal between Newcastle and Sydney.

R. W. Miller owned many coal mines in the Hunter Valley. In 1942, a brewery was purchased in Petersham. This was followed by the purchase of many pubs. In 1967, the Miller's Brewery was sold to Tooheys, followed by the pubs in 1968.

In the late-1960s and early-1970s, TNT, Ampol and Howard Smith built up substantial shareholdings with takeover offers by the latter two resulting in a protracted takeover battle resulting in an important legal case and subsequent appeal to the Privy council, Howard Smith Ltd v Ampol Petroleum Ltd. In 1979, Howard Smith's shareholding was increased to 67% in 1979 when it acquired Ampol's shareholding and in February 1985 it took 100% ownership. In 1988, R. W. Miller merged with Coal & Allied.
