= Seal Bay =

Seal Bay may refer to:

Antarctica

- Seal Bay (Antarctica)

Australia

- Seal Bay (South Australia), a bay on Kangaroo Island
  - Seal Bay Aquatic Reserve, a marine protected area on the south coast of Kangaroo Island
  - Seal Bay Conservation Park, a protected area on Kangaroo Island
  - Seal Bay, South Australia, a locality on Kangaroo Island in Australia

Falkland Islands

- Seal Bay, Falkland Islands

United Kingdom

- Seal Bay, a holiday park in Selsey, West Sussex

United States

- Seal Bay Seaplane Base, Alaska
