= MacGillivray, South Australia =

MacGillivray
- Town
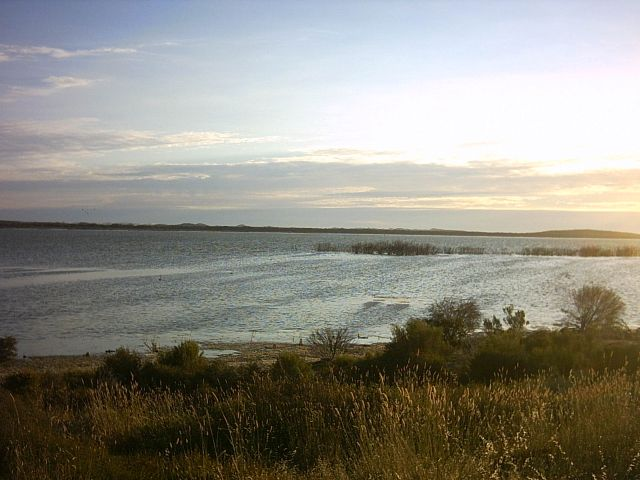
- Murray Lagoon

- Coordinates: 35.810530°S 137.519980°E
- Country: Australia
- State: South Australia
- Region: Fleurieu and Kangaroo Island
- LGA: Kangaroo Island Council
- Location: 140 km (87 mi) southwest of Adelaide; 24 km (15 mi) south of Kingscote
- Established: 2002

Government
  - State electorate: Mawson
  - Federal division: Mayo

Population
  - Total: 117 (SAL 2016)
- Time zone: UTC+9:30 (ACST)
  - Summer (DST): UTC+10:30 (ACST)
- Postcode: 5223
- County: County of Carnarvon
- Mean max temp: 21.0 °C (69.8 °F)
- Mean min temp: 9.0 °C (48.2 °F)
- Annual rainfall: 444.0 mm (17.48 in)
Localities around MacGillivray
Seddon	Kohinoor; Birchmore; Cygnet River	Nepean Bay
Seddon; Seal Bay	MacGillivray	Haines; D'Estrees Bay
Ocean	Ocean	Ocean
- Coordinates; Locations; Climate; Adjoining localities

MacGillivray is a locality in the Australian state of South Australia located on the south coast of Kangaroo Island overlooking the body of water known in Australia as the Southern Ocean and by international authorities as the Great Australian Bight. It is located about 140 kilometres (87 miles) southwest of the state capital of Adelaide and about 24 kilometres (15 miles) south of the municipal seat of Kingscote.

Its boundaries were created in May 2002 for the “long established name” which is derived from the cadastral unit of the Hundred of MacGillivray in which it is located.

The land use within the locality consists of agriculture and conservation with the former use occupying the northern end of the locality while the latter use occupying the southern end and consisting of the following protected areas - the part of the Cape Gantheaume Conservation Park associated the wetland system at Murray Lagoon and the Cape Gantheaume Wilderness Protection Area which covers the entire coastland including the headland known as Cape Gantheaume.

The locality includes the former Faulding's Eucalyptus Plantation, which is listed on the South Australian Heritage Register

MacGillivray is located within the federal division of Mayo, the state electoral district of Mawson and the local government area of the Kangaroo Island Council.

== See also ==
- MacGillivray (disambiguation)
