= Seal Bay (South Australia) =

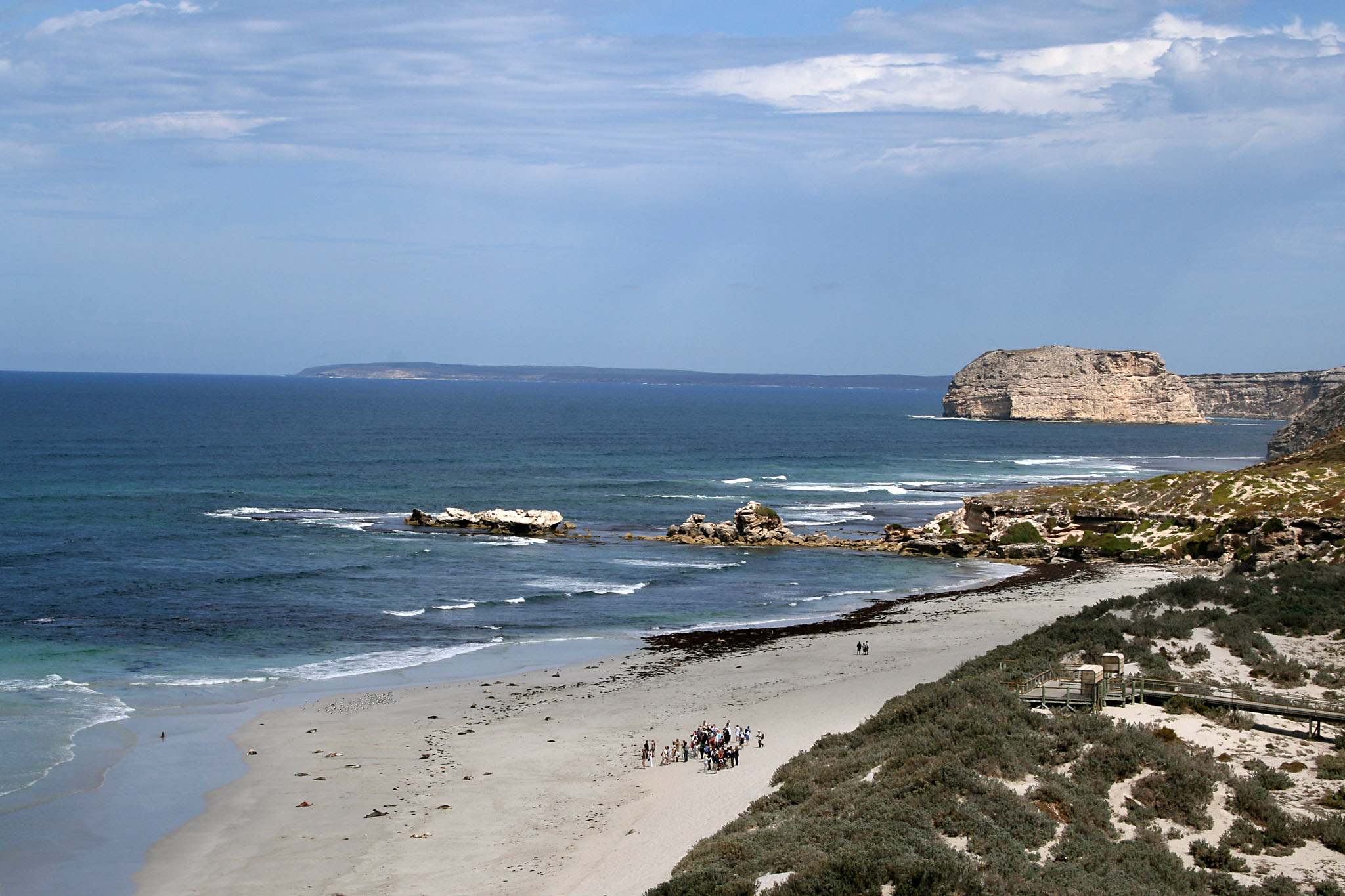
- View to the west along the Seal Bay coastline towards Nobby Islet

- Location in South Australia
- Location: Kangaroo Island, South Australia
- Coordinates: 35°59′45″S 137°19′09″E
- Type: Bay
- Basin countries: Australia
- Max. length: about 7.8 kilometres (4.8 mi)
- Islands: Nobby Islet

Seal Bay is a bay in the Australian state of South Australia located on the south coast of Kangaroo Island about 164 kilometres (102 miles) southwest of the state capital of Adelaide and about 50 kilometres (31 miles) south of the municipal seat of Kingscote.

The name ‘Seal Bay’ refers to the section of coastline associated with both the visitor facilities and the prohibited areas located within the Seal Bay Conservation Park.

The name was gazetted in 1992 after being in use since at least the 1950s.

Protected areas located within the bay’s extent include the Seal Bay Aquatic Reserve and the South Kangaroo Island Marine Park.
