= D'Estrees Bay, South Australia =

D'Estrees Bay
- Town
- Interactive map of D'Estrees Bay
- Coordinates: 35.94866°S 137.57916°E
- Country: Australia
- State: South Australia
- Region: Fleurieu and Kangaroo Island
- LGA: Kangaroo Island Council
- Location: 145 km (90 mi) southwest of Adelaide; 32 km (20 mi) south of Kingscote
- Established: 2002

Government
  - State electorate: Mawson
  - Federal division: Mayo

Population
  - Total: 11 (SAL 2021)
- Time zone: UTC+9:30 (ACST)
  - Summer (DST): UTC+10:30 (ACST)
- Postcode: 5223
- County: Carnarvon
- Mean max temp: 21.0 °C (69.8 °F)
- Mean min temp: 8.9 °C (48.0 °F)
- Annual rainfall: 444.0 mm (17.48 in)
Localities around D'Estrees Bay
MacGillivray	Haines	D'Estrees Bay (water body)
MacGillivray	D'Estrees Bay	D'Estrees Bay (water body)
Ocean	Ocean	Ocean
- Coordinates; Locations; Climate; Adjoining localities

D’Estrees Bay is a locality in the Australian state of South Australia located on the south coast of Kangaroo Island overlooking the body of water known in Australia as the Southern Ocean and by international authorities as the Great Australian Bight. It is located about 145 kilometres (90 miles) southwest of the state capital of Adelaide and about 32 kilometres (20 miles) south of the municipal seat of Kingscote.

Its boundaries which include the Point Tinline Shack Site were created in May 2002 for the “long established name” which is derived from the bay on its eastern coastline.

D’Estrees Bay consists of land which adjoins the southern half of the coastline with D'Estrees Bay and extends to the south coast of the island. The land use within the locality is divided between agriculture, conservation and residential use. Land zoned for conservation consists parts of the following protected areas - the Cape Gantheaume Conservation Park at the south end of the bay and Cape Gantheaume Wilderness Protection Area to the west of the conservation park, and the land adjoining the coastline of the bay to the north of the conservation park. The residential area which is located on the coastline adjoining the bay consists of “single detached dwellings and recreation facilities for holiday makers and permanent residents.”

There was a shore-based bay whaling site in operation here by 1843. In that year the operation consisted of 13 men, two boats and was supervised by a Mr Thompson. The owners of the operation are named as Messrs Bennett and McEllen. There is reference to a whaling station at Flour Cask Bay in operation in the area by 1844, and that it was owned by Messrs Hagan and Hart. However it is likely this was a different name for the same location. A jetty at American River, named Hart’s Jetty, was used by Hart & Co to ship their whale oil to the mainland.

The locality includes the following historic places which are listed on the South Australian Heritage Register - the D'Estrees Bay Whaling Site and the Threshing Floor, Cape Gantheaume Conservation Park.

D’Estrees Bay is located within the federal division of Mayo, the state electoral district of Mawson and the local government area of the Kangaroo Island Council.

== See also ==
- Estrées (disambiguation)
