= Southern Kangaroo Island Marine Park =

Marine protected area south of Kangaroo Island in South Australia

- IUCN category VI (protected area with sustainable use of natural resources)
- Interactive map of Southern Kangaroo Island Marine Park
- Location: Australia
- Nearest city: Kingscote, South Australia
- Coordinates: 36°8′54.96″S 137°22′8.39″E
- Area: 629.93 km^{2} (243.22 sq mi)
- Established: 8 December 2012
- Governing body: Director of National Parks
- Website: Official website

Southern Kangaroo Island Marine Park (formerly Southern Kangaroo Island Commonwealth Marine Reserve) is a marine protected area located south of South Australia in waters within the Australian Exclusive economic zone to the south of Kangaroo Island and ranging in depth from 15 metres (49 feet) to 100 metres (330 feet).

It was gazetted in November 2012. It was renamed on 11 October 2017.

It is part of a group of Australian marine parks managed by the Department of the Environment and Energy known as the South-west Marine Park Network. It is bounded on its northern side by the Southern Kangaroo Island Marine Park, which is managed by the Government of South Australia.

The marine park includes an ecosystem representative of the bioregion known as the "Spencer Gulf Shelf Province", a "key ecological feature" consisting of a feature known as the "Kangaroo Island Pool" and the associated "Eyre Peninsula upwelling" both notable for their "high productivity, breeding and feeding aggregations", a calving area for southern right whale and feeding areas for both the Australian sea lion and the great white shark.

The marine park is classified as an IUCN Category VI protected area.

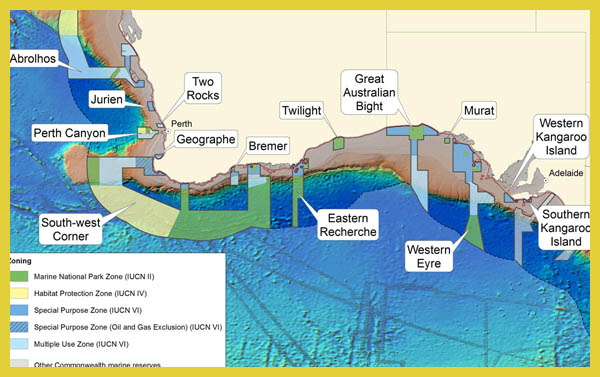
The South-west Corner Marine Reserves Network, including the Southern Kangaroo Island Commonwealth Marine Reserve

== See also ==
- Protected areas managed by the Australian government
