= Pelorus Islet =

Islet in South Australia

Coordinates: 36°06′S 137°32′E

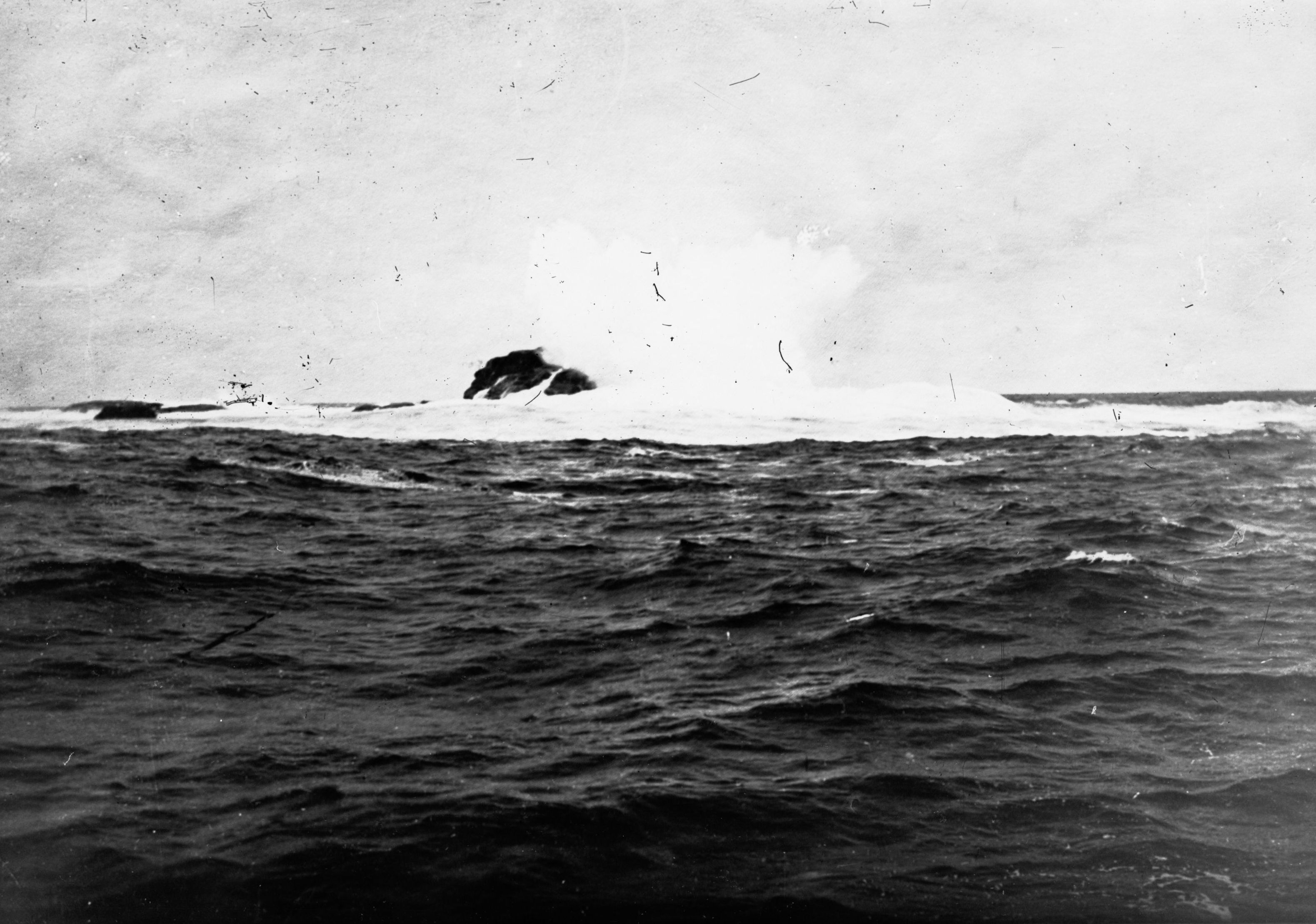
- Pelorus Rocks, off Kangaroo Island, ca 1925

Geography
- Location: Great Australian Bight

Administration
- Australia

Demographics
- Population: 0

Pelorus Islet (also known as Pelorus Reef and Pelorus Rock) is an islet in the Australian state of South Australia located in Great Australian Bight off the south coast of Kangaroo Island approximately 7 kilometres (4.3 miles) east south-east of Cape Gantheaume. It was named by Captain Francis Harding, RN after HMS Pelorus.

== Description ==
Pelorus Islet is about 7 kilometres (4.3 miles) east south-east of Cape Gantheaume. It consists of three separate islets - a main round topped peak of 12 metres (39 feet) height with a reef with several rocks sitting above water level to its east and another exposed rock to its south-west. It is inaccessible by boat as it is subject to continuous swells.

== Formation, geology and oceanography ==
Peloris Islet was formed between 7500 and 8900 years ago after sea levels rose at the start of the Holocene when Kangaroo Island became separated from Yorke and Fleurieu Peninsulas. Pelorus Islet is the remains of a volcanic intrusion reported as being some 506 million years old. The islet rises abruptly from a depth of 35 metres (115 feet).

== Flora and fauna ==
As of 1996, no terrestrial vegetation was present as the islet has been ‘scoured of any soil and small eroded fragments, leaving only a few large boulders’ while the only vertebrate animals observed were New Zealand fur seals and crested terns.

== History ==
Nicolas Baudin is reported as being the first European to describe the islet, however he did not name the islet. The islet was surveyed in May 1838 by HMS Pelorus under the command of Captain Francis Harding RN. It is reported that Harding named the islet after the ship. The Pelorus Islet is reported as being the site of the wrecking of You Yangs on 14 June 1890. You Yangs was a 672 gross tonnage barque rigged screw steamer owned by Howard Smith and Sons.

== Protected areas status ==
Pelorus Islet originally obtained protected area status as a fauna reserve under the former Fauna Conservation Act 1964 As of 1996, it was described as being vacant crown land. It obtained status as a fauna conservation reserve declared under the Crown Lands Act 1929-1966 on 16 March 1967. As of 2016, the islet is part of the Cape Gantheaume Conservation Park. As of 2012, the waters surrounding its shores are part of a habitat protection zone located within the boundaries of the Southern Kangaroo Island Marine Park.
