= Southern Kangaroo Island Marine Park (state waters) =

Marine park in Australia

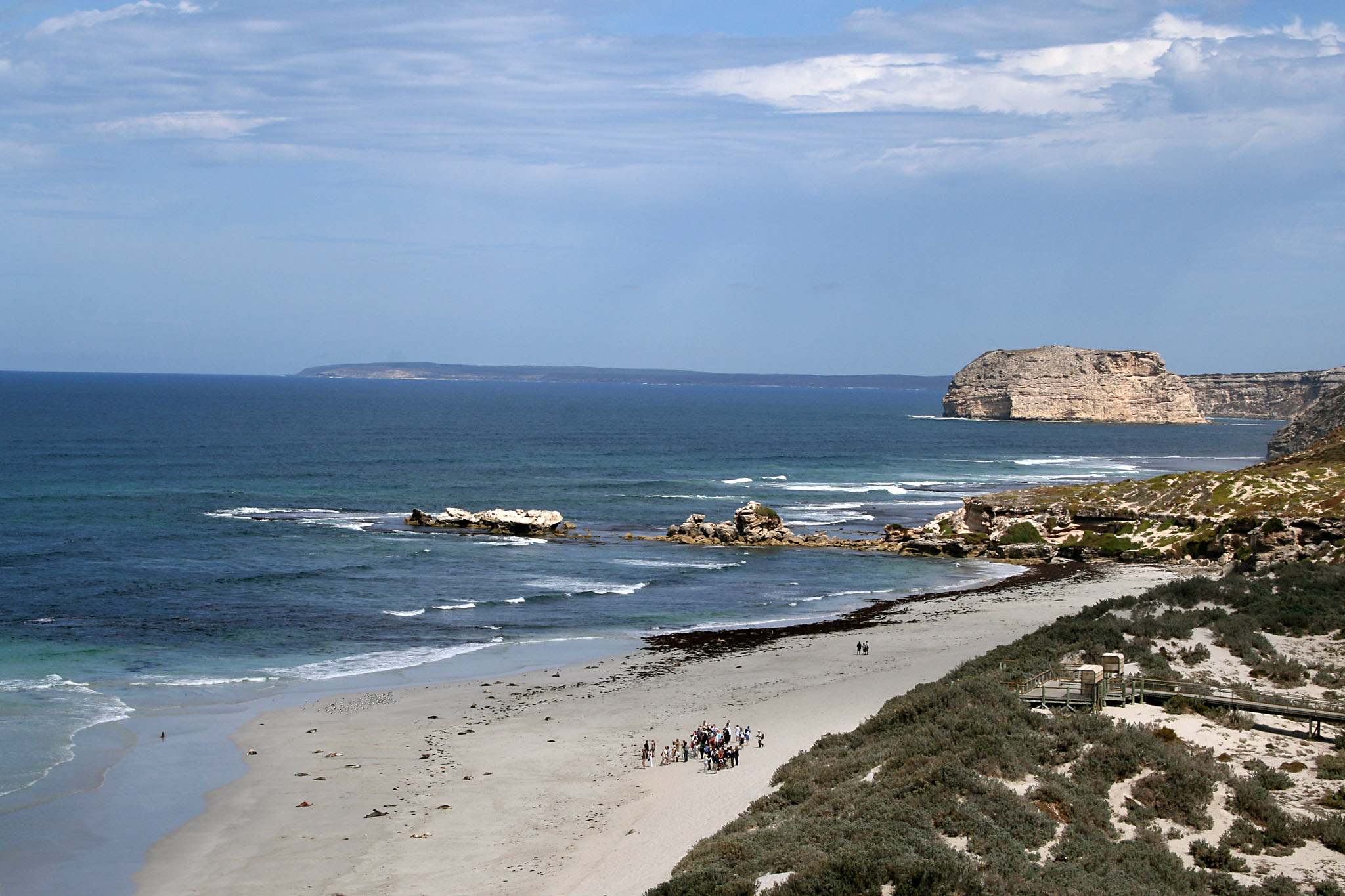
- View of Seal Bay (with Nobby Islet in background) where a Restricted Access Zone is in force.

- Location within South Australia
- Location: South Australia
- Nearest city: Kingscote
- Coordinates: 36°08′34″S 137°30′10″E
- Area: 673 km^{2} (260 sq mi)
- Established: 29 January 2009
- Governing body: Department for Environment and Water
- Website: Official website

Southern Kangaroo Island Marine Park is a marine protected area in the Australian state of South Australia located in state coastal waters adjoining both the south coast of Kangaroo Island and a group of islets located to the south of Kangaroo Island.

The marine park was established on 29 January 2009 under the Marine Parks Act 2007.

The marine park consists of two areas of water. The first is the portion of state waters on the southern coast of Kangaroo Island to a distance of 1.6 kilometres (0.99 mi) from ‘median high water’ from the western end of the Seal Bay Conservation Park in the west to the southern headland of D'Estrees Bay in the east including the waters around Pelorus Islet. The second is the extent of state waters around the following exposed islets located about 27 kilometres (17 mi) south-west of Cape Gantheaume - North Rock, Young Rocks and South West Rock.

The marine park is divided into zones to manage the marine environment to ensure varying degrees of “protection for habitats and biodiversity” and varying levels of “ecologically sustainable development and use” as follows:

- One “restricted access zone” which underlays the full extent of the Seal Bay Aquatic Reserve and part of the Seal Bay Conservation Park.
- One “sanctuary zone” that occupies the full extent of the marine park iat its western end and where “the removal or harm of plants, animals or marine products” is prohibited. It adjoins both the Seal Bay Conservation Park and the Cape Gantheaume Wilderness Protection Area, and overlays the full extent of the Bales Beach Aquatic Reserve.
- Two “habitat protection zones” adjoining the remainder of the coastline of Kangaroo Island in the east and the waters around North Rock, Young Rocks and South West Rock, where “activities and uses that do not harm habitats or the functioning of ecosystems” are only permitted.

The portion of the marine park on the coastline of Kangaroo Island is adjoined by the Southern Kangaroo Island Marine Park which is a marine protected area managed by the Australian government, on its southern side at the limits of state waters.

As of 2016, the marine park has been classified under the IUCN system of protected area categories with the “restricted access zone” being Category Ia, the “sanctuary zone” being IUCN Category II and the “habitat protection zones” being IUCN Category IV.
