= Cape Gantheaume =

- other
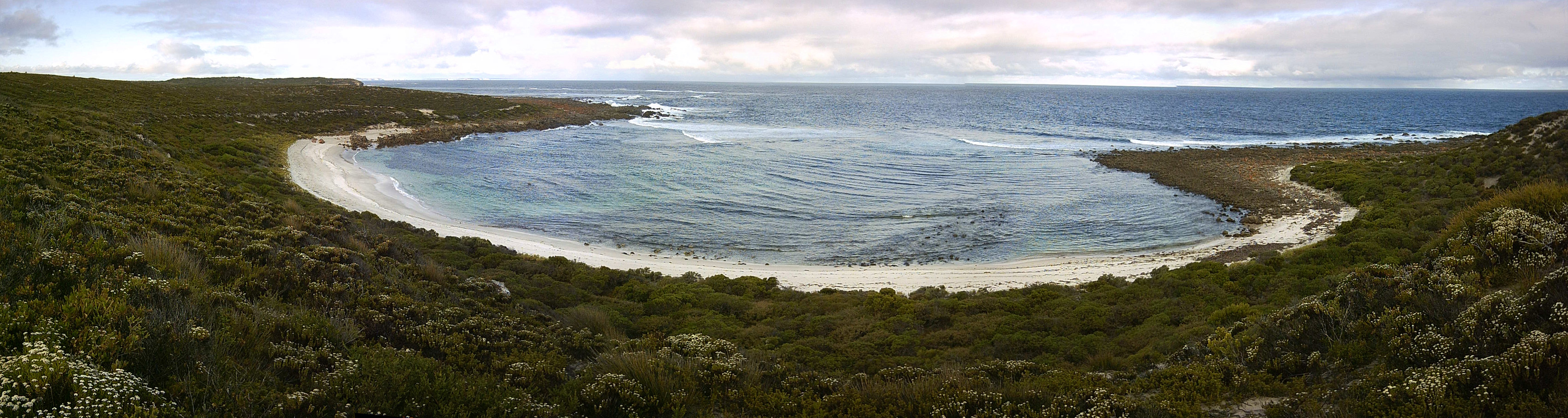
- Cape Gantheaume horseshoe-shaped bay

- Coordinates: 36°04′30″S 137°27′38″E
- Country: Australia
- State: South Australia
- LGA: Kangaroo Island Council
- Elevation: 46 m (151 ft)

Cape Gantheaume is a headland located on the south coast of Kangaroo Island in South Australia. It was named after Vice admiral Honoré Joseph Antoine Ganteaume (1755–1818) by the Baudin expedition to Australia during 1803. It is currently located within the protected area known as the Cape Gantheaume Wilderness Protection Area.

== Description ==
Cape Gantheaume is the most southerly point on the south coast of Kangaroo Island. It is the termination for a pair of cliffed coastlines – one extending from Vivonne Bay in the north west and the other extending from D'Estrees Bay in the north east. Its cliff top is 46 metres (151 feet) above sea level. When viewed from the south on a platform such as a ship, the cape is reported as being 'steep on its W(est) side and sloping on its E(ast) side.'

== Formation, geology & oceanography ==
Cape Gantheaume was formed when the sea reached its present level 7,500 years ago after sea levels started to rise at the start of the Holocene. The cliff line which includes Cape Gantheaume consists of a metamorphic rock belonging to the Kanmantoo group bedrock called Middleton Sandstone. The cliff at Cape Gantheaume is described as having 'spectacular re-entrants' due to the 'differential weathering of near vertical basic dykes.' The water adjoining Cape Gantheaume drops to a depth of 50 metres (160 feet) within 4 nautical miles (7.4 km; 4.6 mi) of the coastline. In addition to wave-cut platforms along its west and east sides, a reef extends about 0.75 nautical miles (1.39 km; 0.86 mi) in a west south-west direction from the cape.

== Flora and fauna ==
=== Flora ===
A coastal heath occupies the cliff top from Cape Gantheaume eastward to D'Estrees Bay for a distance from 200 metres (660 feet) to 700 metres (2,300 feet) inland from the cliff edge. The heath has a cover of 70 to 80% with exception of the immediate cliff edge and grows on soils varying from shallow sand to sheet limestone where plants will form mats over the bare rock surface. The heath does not exceed 1 metre (3 feet 3 inches) in height with the exception of hollows sheltered from the prevailing weather. As of 1977, the main species found in the heath were Acaena anserinifolia, Acrotriche patula, Bitter bush, Goodenia varia, Phyllota pleurandroides, Lasiopetalum discolour, Lasiopetalum schultzenii, Logania crassifolia and Muehlenbeckia adpressa.

=== Fauna ===
Cape Gantheaume and the coast immediately to its east is notable as a haul out area and breeding colony for New Zealand fur seals. A colony of Little penguins once existed at Cape Gantheaume, but is now extinct.

== History ==
=== Aboriginal use ===
As of 1999, the literature had not cited any archaeological discoveries specific to Aboriginal use of land in the immediate vicinity of Cape Gantheaume.

=== European use ===
Cape Gantheaume was discovered and named after Vice Admiral Honoré Joseph Antoine Ganteaume (1755–1818) by the Baudin expedition to Australia during 1803. In 1954, Cape Gantheaume became the eastern end of a closed area proclaimed under the Animals and Birds Protection Act 1946 extending from Nobby Islet in the west for the purpose of protecting sea lions. Cape Gantheaume was part of the parcel of land which was initially dedicated in 1971 as the Cape Gantheaume Conservation Park and which was re-dedicated again in 1972 following the enactment of the National Parks and Wildlife Act 1972. In 1993, a large portion of the conservation park including Cape Gantheaume was excised to create a new protected area called the Cape Gantheaume Wilderness Protection Area.

== Economic activity ==
As of 2014, the sole economic use of the land at Cape Gantheaume is the use of an unmarked trekking trail for which a fee is charged. The trail extends along the coast from near D'Estrees Bay within the Cape Gantheaume Conservation Park in the east to Bales Bay within the Seal Bay Conservation Park in the west.

== Protected area status ==
Cape Gantheaume is currently located within the protected area known as the Cape Gantheaume Wilderness Protection Area. As of 2012, the waters surrounding its shores are part of a habitat protection zone located within the boundaries of the Southern Kangaroo Island Marine Park.
