= Seal Bay Conservation Park =

Protected area in South Australia

- IUCN category VI (protected area with sustainable use of natural resources)
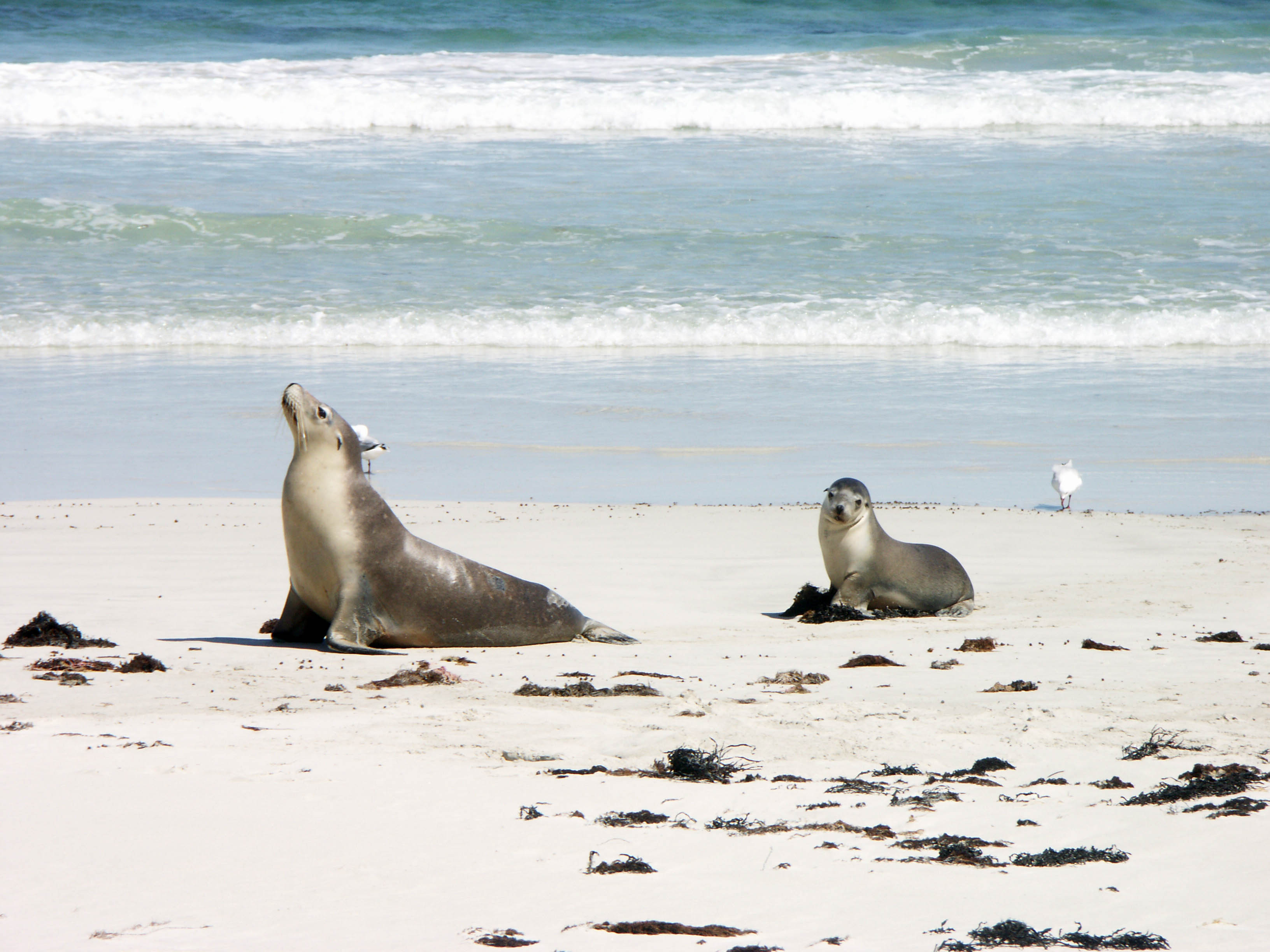
- Australian sea lions on beach at Seal Bay Conservation Park

- Location within South Australia
- Location: South Australia
- Nearest city: Kingscote
- Coordinates: 35°59′55″S 137°21′45″E
- Area: 63.67 km^{2} (24.58 sq mi)
- Established: 27 April 1967
- Visitors: 85374 (in 2022)
- Governing body: Department for Environment and Water
- Website: Official website

Seal Bay Conservation Park is a protected area located on the south coast of Kangaroo Island in the Australian state of South Australia. It is the home of the third largest Australian sea lion colony in Australia.

It is one of the most popular tourist destinations on Kangaroo Island, with 121,819 visitors in 2018-19. To protect the colony, visitors are only allowed on the beach as part of a guided tour.

== Description ==
=== Location ===
Seal Bay Conservation Park is located in South Australia on the south coast of Kangaroo Island about 50 kilometres (31 mi) south of the municipal seat of Kingscote. It is located within the gazetted locality of Seal Bay.

=== Extent ===
The conservation park is part of a group of protected areas extending along the coastline from the east end of Vivonne Bay in the west to the southern end of D'Estrees Bay in the east. It occupies several parcels of land which are bounded to the north in part by the South Coast Road by the West Bay Road and by the coastline in the south. It also includes Nobby Islet.

A road named Seal Bay Road provides access to visitor facilities at Bales Beach in the east and overlooking the body of water known as Seal Bay in the west.

=== Protected area designation ===
The conservation park is classified as an IUCN Category VI protected area.

== History ==
The sea lion population on Kangaroo Island had been exploited for economic purposes since the European colonisation. As sea lions were still being hunted as a source of shark bait post 1945, the Field Naturalists section of the Royal Society of South Australia wrote to the South Australian Museum in 1953 requesting that sea lions be given protection along the southern coast of Kangaroo Island. The request was also supported by both the South Australian Ornithological Association and the fledgling tourism industry on Kangaroo Island. A recommendation was forwarded to the Department of Fisheries and Game for the proclamation of a sanctuary of 10 miles (16 kilometres) in length. A closed area for sea-lions extending from Nobby Islet to Cape Gantheaume was subsequently proclaimed under the Animals and Birds Protection Act 1946 at Seal Beach on 28 October 1954.

Organised tours commenced in 1955 as an initiative of a Kangaroo Island resident. As of 1969, six operators conveyed total of 7525 tourists to the reserve while "a large number of people visited the area with private and hire cars". In 1974, the estimated annual visitation was between 25,000 and 30,000 people; in 1994 it was 70,000 people; and in 2014-15, it was 101,595.

On 27 April 1967, the reserve was re-dedicated as a fauna reserve under the Fauna Conservation Act 1964 along with the inclusion of two prohibited areas intended to protect the breeding area from interference. The reserve was also concurrently dedicated as a fauna conservation reserve under the Crown Lands Act 1929.

In 1971, an aquatic reserve in the waters adjoining the Seal Beach foreshore was proclaimed under the Fisheries Act 1971 . In 1972, the reserve was again re-dedicated as the Seal Bay Conservation Park under the newly enacted National Parks and Wildlife Act 1972.

In 1980, the conservation park was listed on the now-defunct Register of the National Estate.

== Associated protected areas ==
The Seal Bay Conservation Park is associated with three other protected areas which support the objectives of its management plan. These are the Seal Bay Aquatic Reserve, the Bales Beach Aquatic Reserve and the Southern Kangaroo Island Marine Park.

== Gallery ==
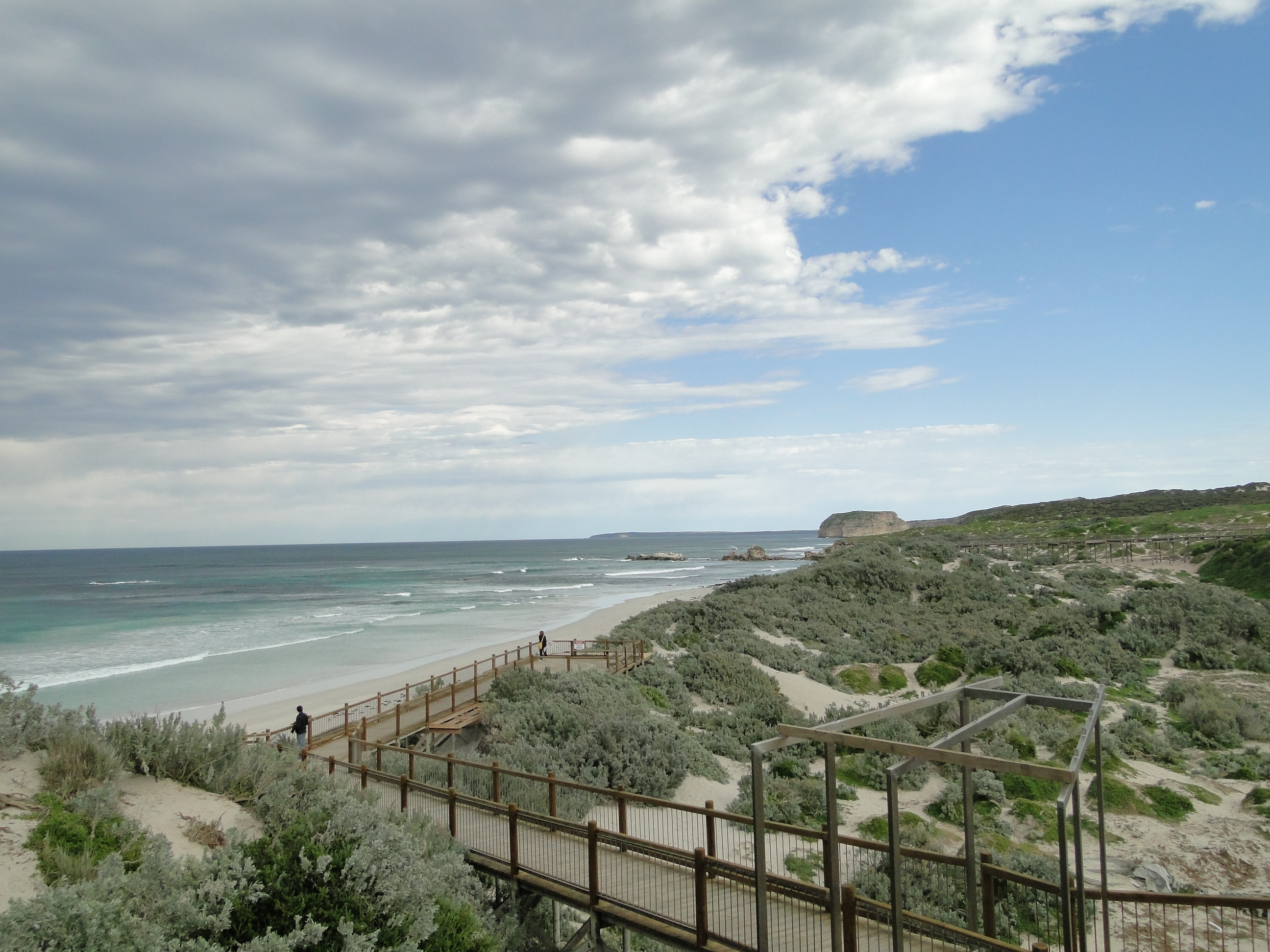
Board walk

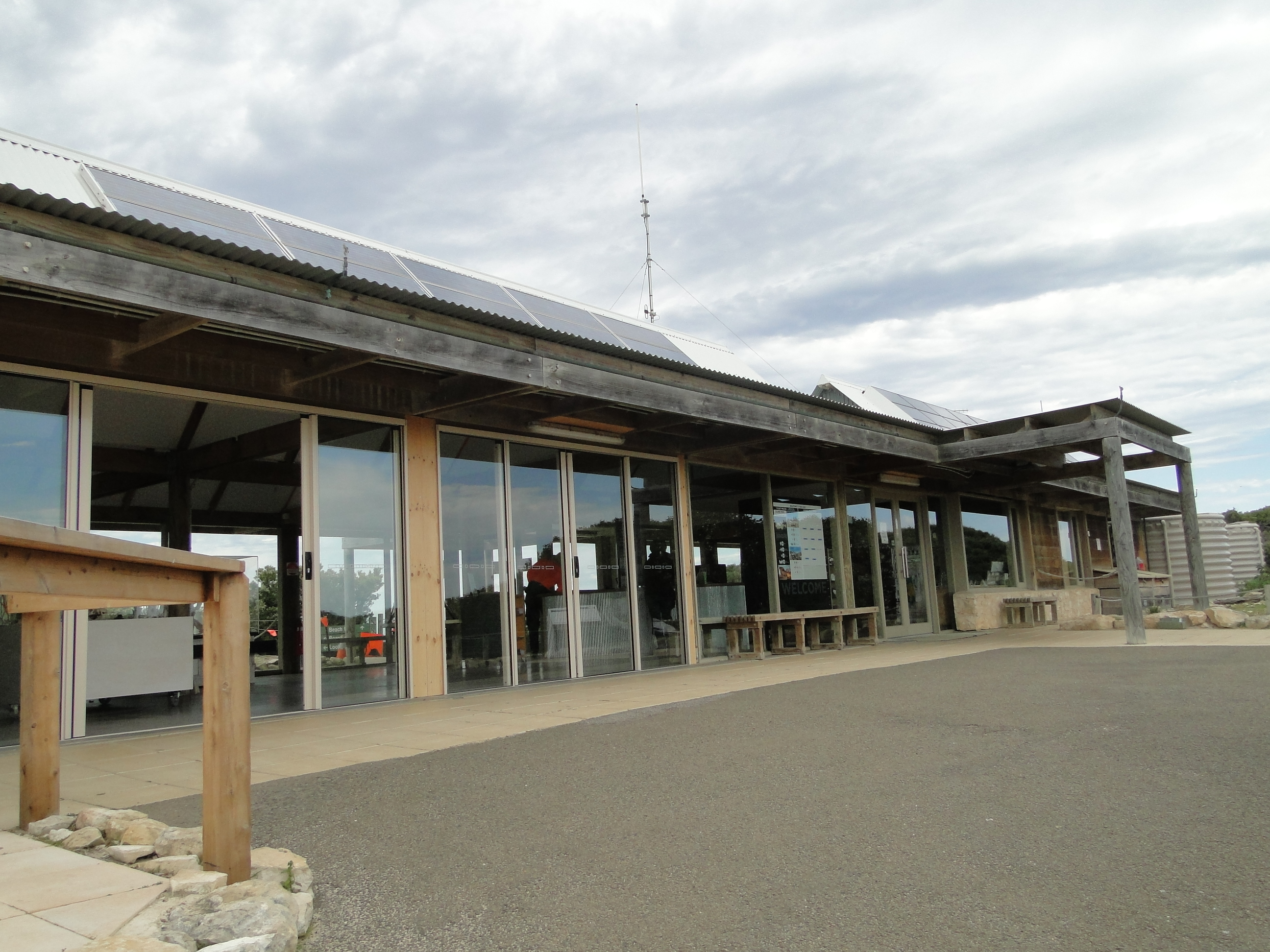
Visitor centre

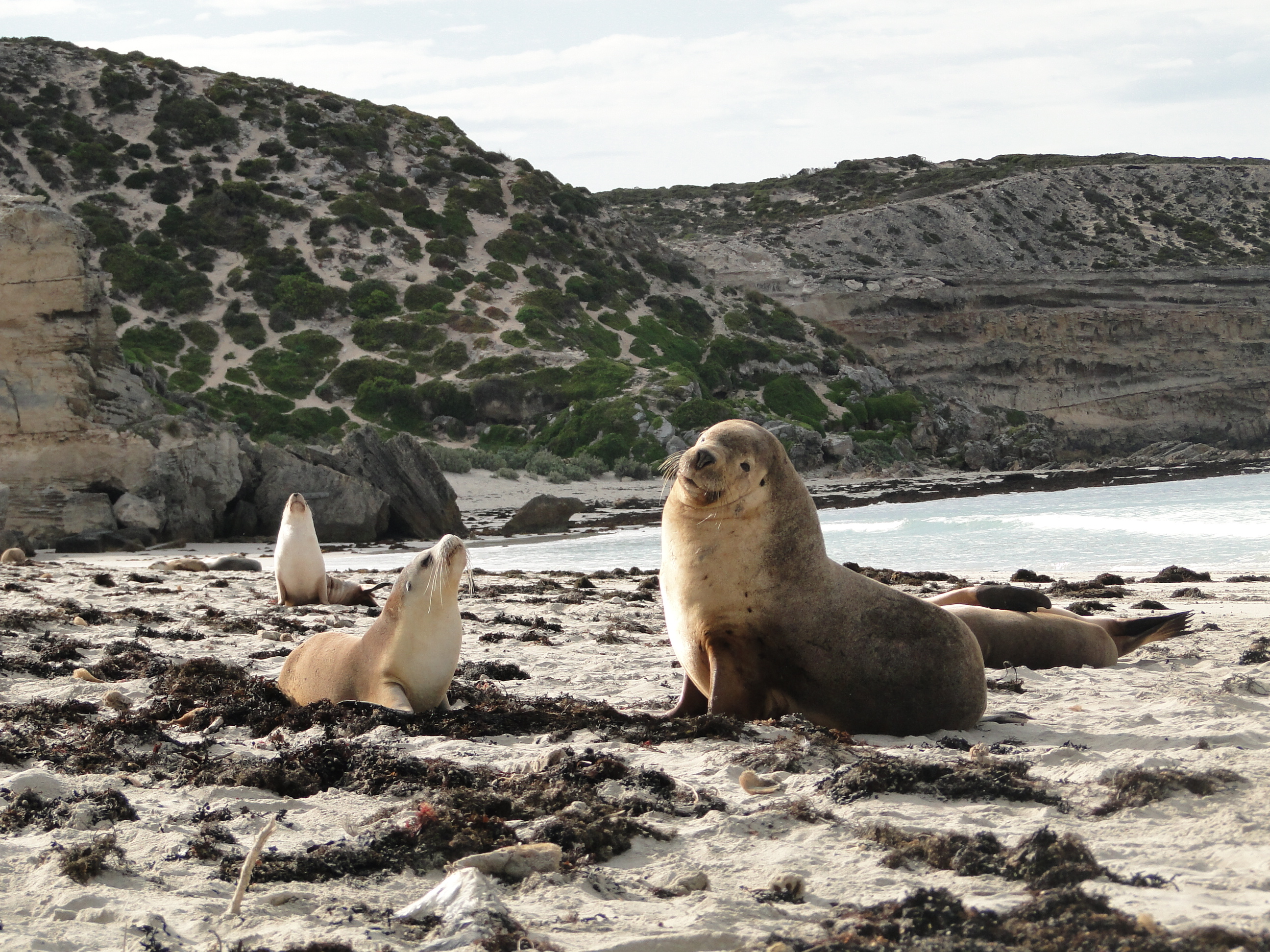
Sea lions on the beach

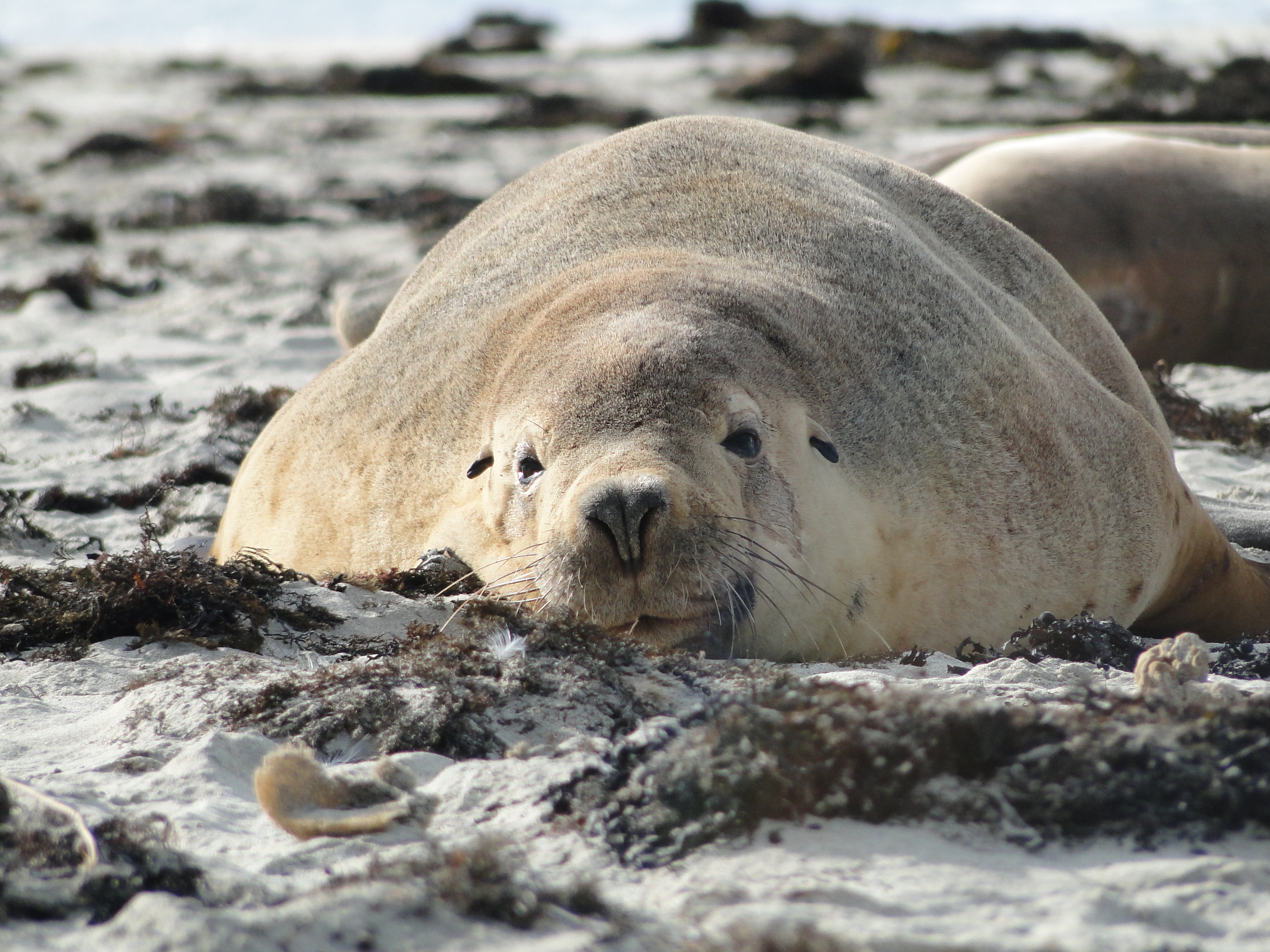
Sea lion on beach

== See also ==
- Protected areas of South Australia

== Citations and references ==
Citations

References

- "Seal Bay Conservation Park Management Plan, amendment to plan of management" (PDF). Department of Environment and Natural Resources (DENR). 1993.
- "Management Plan, Seal Bay and Cape Gantheaume Conservation Parks, Kangaroo Island, South Australia" (PDF). National Parks and Wildlife Service, Department of Environment (NPWS). 1977.
- "Southern Kangaroo Island Marine Park Management Plan 2012" (PDF). Department of Environment Water and Natural Resources. 2012.
- "(DEWNR) Annual Report 2014-15" (PDF). Department of Environment, Water and Natural Resources. 30 September 2015.
- "Protected Areas of South Australia September (Map) 2015 Edition" (PDF). Department of Environment, Water and Natural Resources (DEWNR). 30 July 2015.
- A.C., Robinson; Canty, P.; Mooney, T.; Rudduck, P. (1996). South Australia's offshore islands (PDF). Canberra: Australian Heritage Commission. ISBN 0-644350-11-3.
