= Bales Beach Aquatic Reserve =

Protected area in South Australia

- IUCN category II (national park)
- Location within South Australia
- Location: South Australia
- Nearest city: Vivonne Bay.
- Coordinates: 36.0005°S 137.3547°E
- Area: 7.3 km^{2} (2.8 sq mi)
- Established: after 1971
- Governing body: Primary Industries and Regions SA (PIRSA)

Bales Beach Aquatic Reserve was a marine protected area in the Australian state of South Australia located in waters off the south coast of Kangaroo Island immediately adjoining and including the intertidal zone within the locality of Seal Bay whose full extent is occupied by the Seal Bay Conservation Park.

It was declared after 1971 for the purpose of "the protection of a major breeding colony of the Australian sea lion". The collection or the removal of any marine organism was prohibited within the reserve. The aquatic reserve which immediately adjoined the Seal Bay Aquatic Reserve extents eastward for a distance of about 5 kilometres (3.1 miles) Bay and also extends seaward a distance of about 1 nautical mile (1.9 km; 1.2 mi). It has an area of 7.3 square kilometres (2.8 square miles). While it was managed in conjunction with the Seal Bay Aquatic Reserve, it was gazetted as a separate aquatic reserve. On 20 October 2016, it was abolished.

Since 2012, it was located within the boundaries of a "habitat protection zone" within the Southern Kangaroo Island Marine Park.

The aquatic reserve was classified as an IUCN Category II protected area.

== See also ==
- Protected areas of South Australia
