= Uncinaria sanguinis =

Scientific classification
- Kingdom: Animalia
- Phylum: Nematoda
- Class: Chromadorea
- Order: Rhabditida
- Family: Ancylostomatidae
- Genus: Uncinaria
- Species: U. sanguinis

Binomial name
- Uncinaria sanguinis Marcus et al., 2014

Species of roundworm

Uncinaria sanguinis is a species of nematode. It is a parasite of the Australian sea lion, found in South Australia.
