= Seal Bay Aquatic Reserve =

Protected area in South Australia

- IUCN category Ia (strict nature reserve)
- Location within South Australia
- Location: South Australia
- Nearest city: Vivonne Bay
- Coordinates: 35°59′52″S 137°18′15″E
- Area: 4.04 km^{2} (1.56 sq mi)
- Established: 1 December 1971
- Governing body: Primary Industries and Regions SA (PIRSA)

Seal Bay Aquatic Reserve was a marine protected area in the Australian state of South Australia located in waters off the south coast of Kangaroo Island immediately adjoining and including the intertidal zone within the locality of Seal Bay which is also part of the Seal Bay Conservation Park.

It was declared on 30 November 1971 as the Seal Beach Aquatic Reserve for the purpose of "the protection of a major breeding colony of the Australian sea lion". The following activities are prohibited in the aquatic reserve - access to waters adjoining Seal Bay by members of the public, fishing, and the collection or the removal of any marine organism. The aquatic reserve covered the full extent of the coastal frontage of Seal Bay and extended seaward a distance of about 1 nautical mile (1.9 km; 1.2 mi) covering an area of 4.04 square kilometres (1.56 square miles). Its extent included the waters around Nobby Islet. It was bounded by the Bales Beach Aquatic Reserve to its immediate east. On 20 October 2016, it was abolished.

Since 2012, it was located within the boundaries of a “restricted access zone” within the Southern Kangaroo Island Marine Park.

In 2014, the aquatic reserve was classified as an IUCN Category Ia protected area.

== See also ==
- Protected areas of South Australia
