= Estrées (name) =

Estrées is an old French family name. The etymology of the name is from strata, after "strata"/"estrée" - the stone-layered Roman roads which gave their name to numerous villages in the north of France through which such a road passes (see Estrées). Other variations on the family name are: Estrée, d'Estrées, d'Estrée, Destree, D'Estree, de Lestrée, de Tray, and DeTray (the last two being Anglicized versions of d'Estrées).

The name was borne by a French noble family, the Maison d'Estrées, of which some members also held the title of Duc d'Estrées.

== People ==
- Antoine d'Estrées (1529–1609), Governor of Boulonnais, lieutenant-general of Île-de-France
- Gabrielle d'Estrées, (1571–1599), sister of François Annibal, lover of Henry IV of France
- François Annibal d'Estrées (1573-1670), Marshal of France
- Jean II d'Estrées (1624–1707), Admiral and Marshal of France
- César d'Estrées (1628–1714), brother of Jean II, diplomat and Prelate
- Victor-Marie d'Estrées (1660–1737), Marshal of France
- Jean III d'Estrées, (1666–1718), brother of Victor Marie, diplomat, Prelate and Archbishop of Cambrai
- Louis Charles César Le Tellier (1695-1771), Marshal of France

== See also ==
- Estrées (disambiguation)
