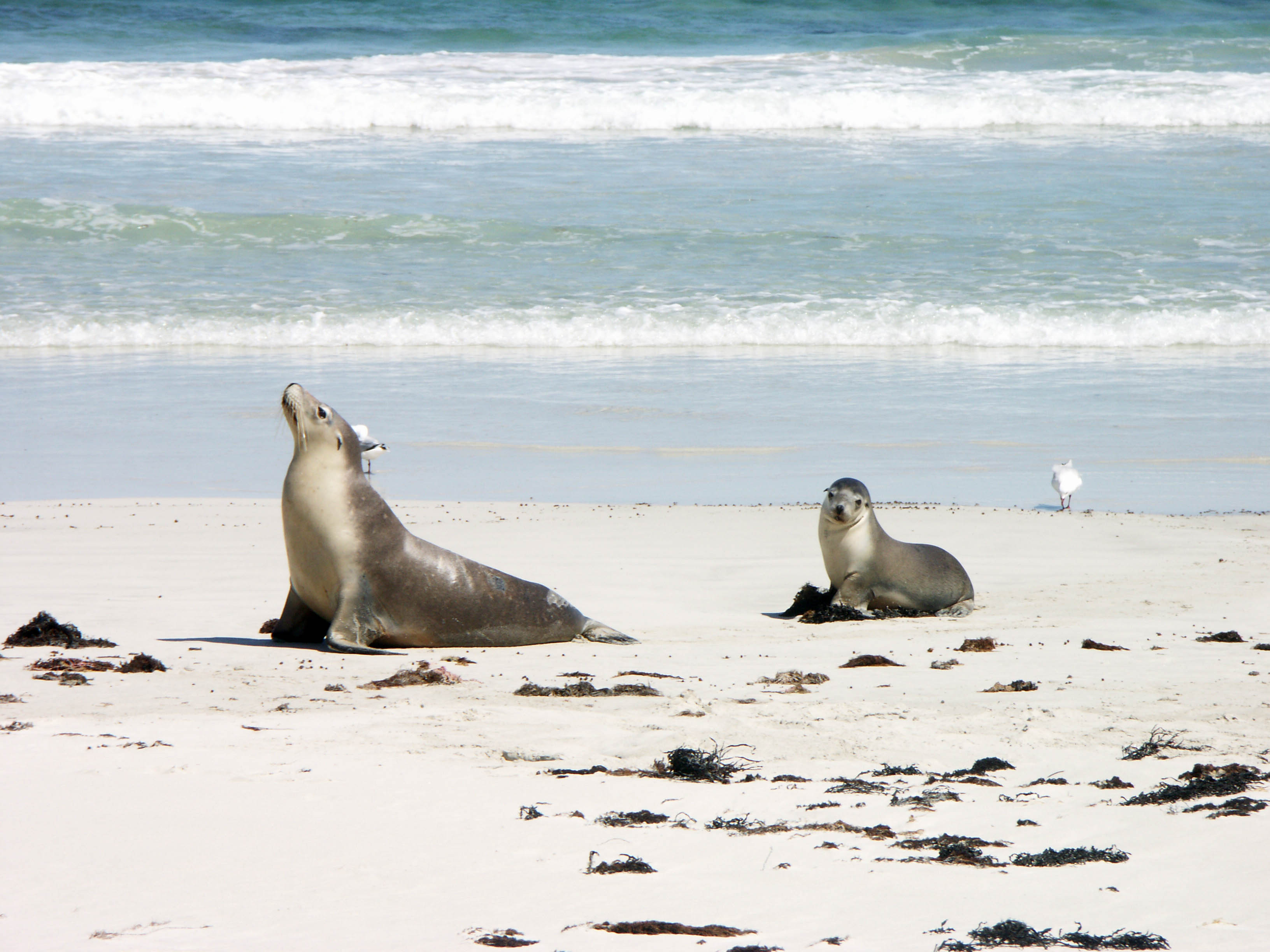
- N. cinerea, adult and pup

Scientific classification
- Kingdom: Animalia
- Phylum: Chordata
- Class: Mammalia
- Order: Carnivora
- Parvorder: Pinnipedia
- Family: Otariidae
- Genus: Neophoca; Gray 1866

Type species
- Arctocephalus lobatus Gray 1828

Species
- N. cinerea; †N. palatina

= Neophoca =

Genus of carnivores

Neophoca is a genus of the family Otariidae (sea lions and fur seals) of order Carnivora. It is combined by some taxonomists with the genus Phocarctos, the (extant) New Zealand sea lion.
