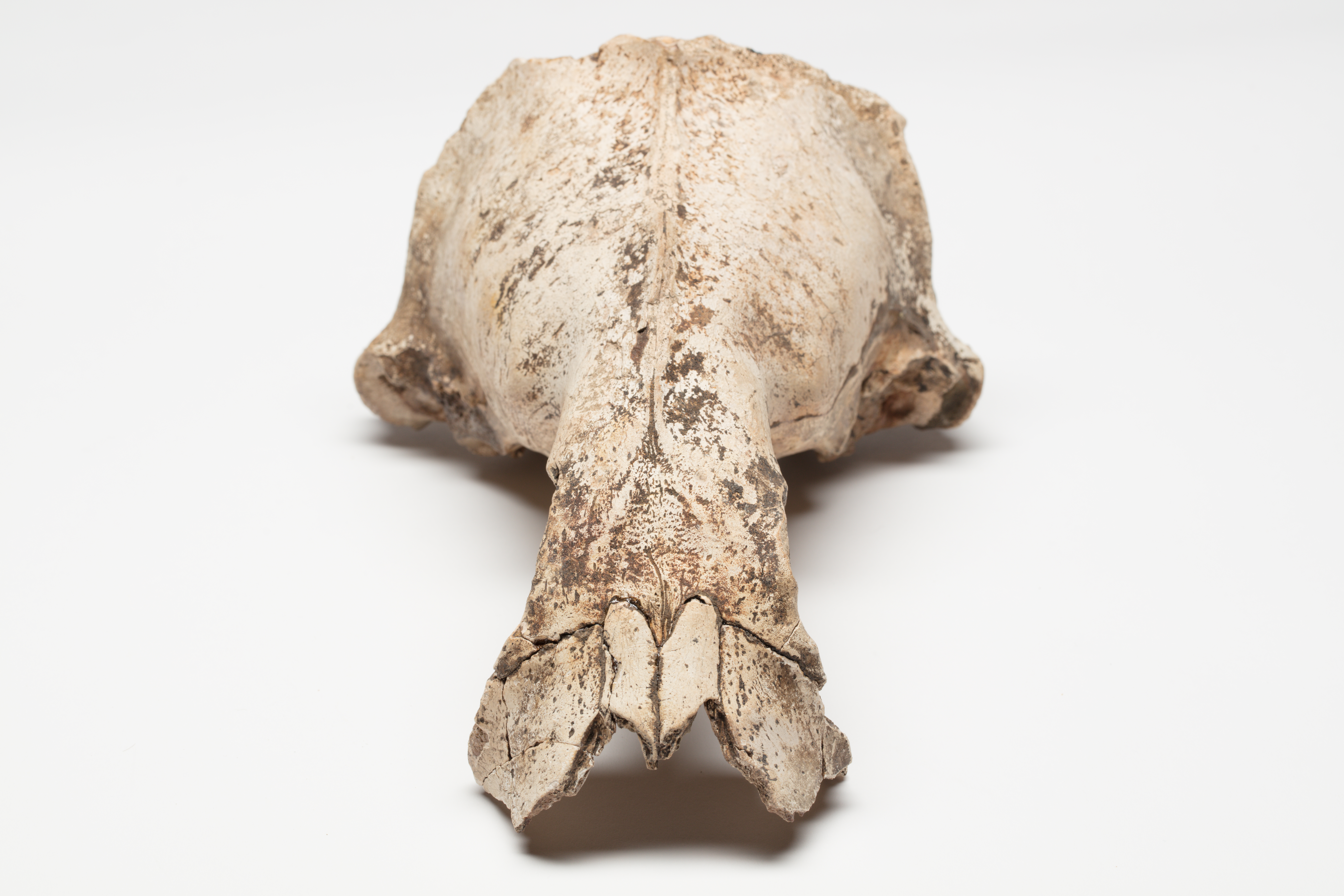
- The adult male skull holotype in Auckland Museum.

Scientific classification
- Domain: Eukaryota
- Kingdom: Animalia
- Phylum: Chordata
- Class: Mammalia
- Order: Carnivora
- Clade: Pinnipedia
- Family: Otariidae
- Genus: Neophoca
- Species: †N. palatina

Binomial name
- †Neophoca palatina (King, 1983)

= Neophoca palatina =

Neophoca palatina Temporal range: Pleistocene

Extinct species of carnivore

Neophoca palatina, the Pleistocene New Zealand sea lion, is an extinct species of pinniped known from a nearly-complete adult male skull found at Ōhope Beach on the North Island in 1937. It was found in a stratum from the late Castlecliffian stage, suggesting an approximate age of 400,000 years. It was not recognised as representing a new species until 1983, distinguishable from the extant Australian sea lion and New Zealand sea lion by the short palate (leading Dr. J. A. Berry to suggest the species name), lack of processes on the ethmoid bulla and the very wide basiocciptal. A more advanced morphometric analysis in 2016 strongly confirmed that the skull represented a distinct species, closely related to the Australian sea lion. Paleoclimate reconstructions suggest that N. palatina was more tolerant of cold water temperatures than N. cinerea, the only other known member of the genus.
