= Estrées =

Estrée or Estrées may refer to:

- Estrées (name), a French family name and the name of the Maison d'Estrées family (including a list of people bearing this name)
- Duke of Estrées, a title of nobility in the peerage of France that was created for the Maison d'Estrées in 1663

== Places ==
=== France ===
- Estrées, Aisne, canton of Catelet, Saint-Quentin arrondissement, Aisne department, Picardy region
- Estrées, Nord, canton of Arleux, Douai arrondissement, Nord department, Nord-Pas-de-Calais region
- Estrées-Deniécourt, in the Somme department
- Estrées-la-Campagne, in the Calvados department
- Estrées-lès-Crécy, in the Somme department
- Estrées-Mons, in the Somme department
- Estrées-Saint-Denis, in the Oise department
- Estrées-sur-Noye, in the Somme department
- Estrée, in the Pas-de-Calais department
- Estrée-Blanche, in the Pas-de-Calais department
- Estrée-Cauchy, in the Pas-de-Calais department
- Estrée-Wamin, in the Pas-de-Calais department
- Mesnil-sur-l'Estrée, in the Eure department

=== Elsewhere ===
- D'Estrees Bay, a bay on the southern coast of Kangaroo Island, Australia
  - D'Estrees Bay, South Australia, a locality
- Fort d'Estrées, fort named after Jean II d'Estrées which now houses the Historical Museum of Senegal on Gorée island, Senegal

=== In literature ===
- Estrées, a town extensively described in Ch. XXI of André Maurois' "The Silences of Colonel Bramble" and which may or may not refer to one of the actual places so named.

== Other uses ==
- D'Estrées-class cruiser, a pair of protected cruisers built for the French Navy
