= Uncinaria =

Scientific classification
- Kingdom: Animalia
- Phylum: Nematoda
- Class: Chromadorea
- Order: Rhabditida
- Family: Ancylostomatidae
- Genus: Uncinaria; Frölich, 1789

Genus of roundworms

Uncinaria is a genus of nematodes. The genus was circumscribed by Josef Aloys Frölich in 1789.

Species include:

- Uncinaria criniformis (Goeze, 1782)
- Uncinaria lucasi Stiles, 1901
- Uncinaria sanguinis Marcus et al., 2014
- Uncinaria stenocephala (Railliet, 1884)
- Uncinaria yukonensis (Wolfgang, 1956)
