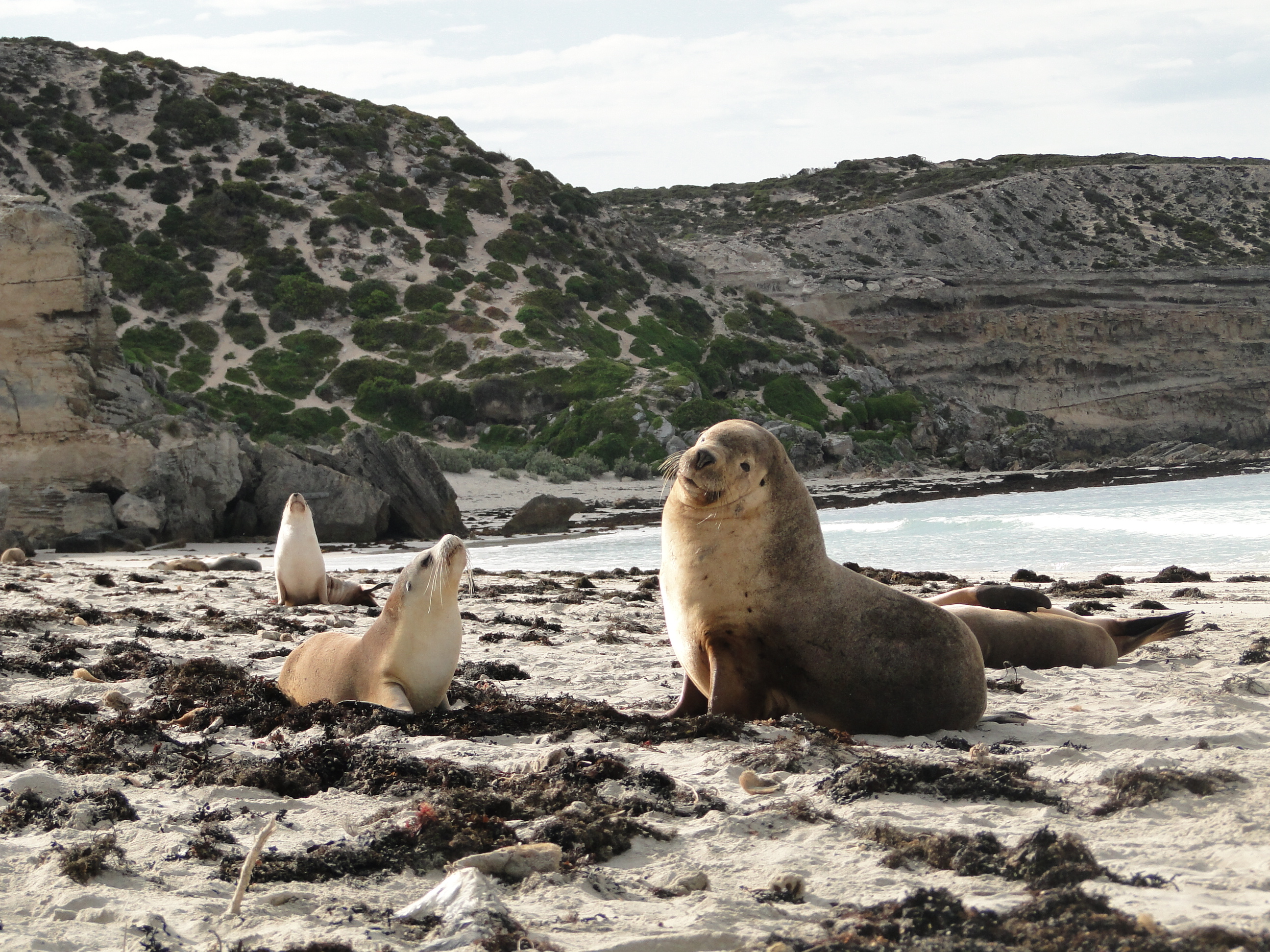

Conservation status
- Endangered (IUCN 3.1)

Scientific classification
- Kingdom: Animalia
- Phylum: Chordata
- Class: Mammalia
- Order: Carnivora
- Parvorder: Pinnipedia
- Family: Otariidae
- Genus: Neophoca
- Species: N. cinerea

Binomial name
- Neophoca cinerea (Péron, 1816)
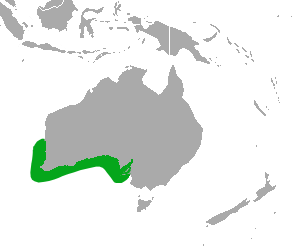
- Australian sea lion range

= Australian sea lion =

Species of carnivore

The Australian sea lion (Neophoca cinerea), also known as the Australian sea-lion or Australian sealion, is a species of sea lion that is the only endemic pinniped in Australia. It is currently monotypic in the genus Neophoca, with the extinct Pleistocene New Zealand sea lion Neophoca palatina the only known congener. With a population estimated at 14,730 animals, the Wildlife Conservation Act of Western Australia (1950) has listed them as "in need of special protection". Their conservation status is listed as endangered. These pinnipeds are specifically known for their abnormal breeding cycles, which are varied between a 5-month breeding cycle and a 17-18-month aseasonal breeding cycle, compared to other pinnipeds, which fit into a 12-month reproductive cycle. Females are either silver or fawn with a cream underbelly, and males are dark brown with a yellow mane and are bigger than the females.

== Distribution ==
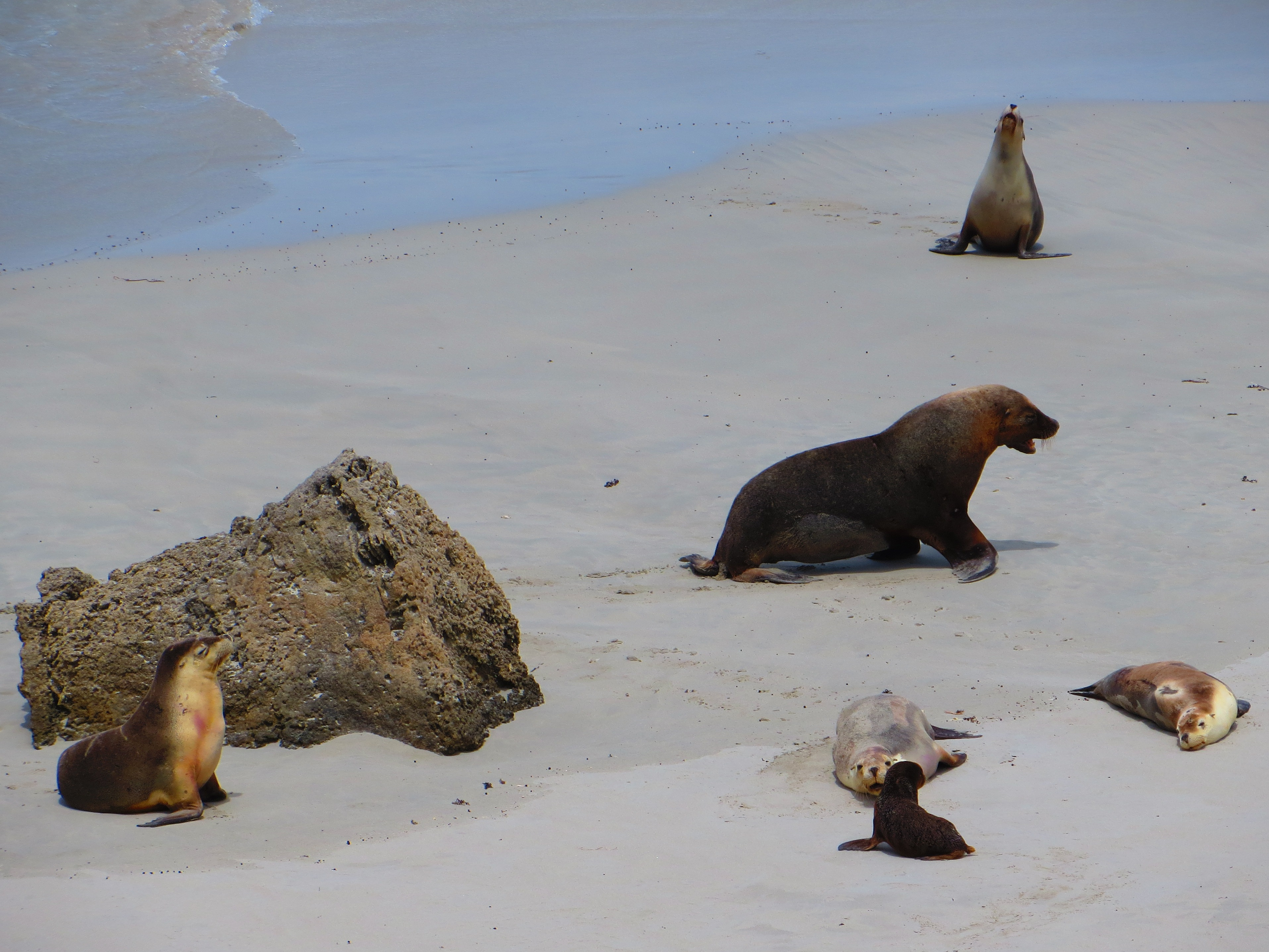
A colony of Australian sea lions at the beach in Seal Bay Conservation Park, Kangaroo Island, South Australia

Australian sea lions are sparsely distributed across their range, from the Houtman Abrolhos Islands (28°S, 114°E) in Western Australia, along the southern Australian coast to The Pages Islands (35°46'S, 138°18'E) in South Australia. Sixty-six breeding colonies have been identified, with 28 in Western Australia and 38 in South Australia.

Most breeding colonies exist on offshore islands, with the exception of Point Labatt in South Australia, Baxter Cliffs (west of Twilight Cove) in Western Australia, and the Bunda Cliffs, Great Australian Bight, which straddles the border between the two states. About 42% of the total known population is found within the three largest colonies east of Port Lincoln; Seal Bay (on Kangaroo Island's south coast), The Pages, and Dangerous Reef (in Spencer Gulf).

The species' breeding range has contracted as the population has fallen. Now-extinct breeding colonies previously existed in the Bass Strait, particularly on Clarke Island and adjacent islands in the Furneaux Group. The Abrolhos Island breeding colony is believed to be much smaller today than it was prior to European settlement. Kangaroo Island's northeasterly coasts, in addition to some islands near Perth and Albany, once hosted now-extinct breeding colonies.

== Phylogeny ==
The Australian sea lion is a pinniped, most closely related to other species of sea lions and fur seals making up the family Otariidae. These mammals use their flippers to propel themselves in water and walk on land. Australian sea lions share distinct features with other sea lions, including short fur, short flippers, and a bulky body.

== Communication ==
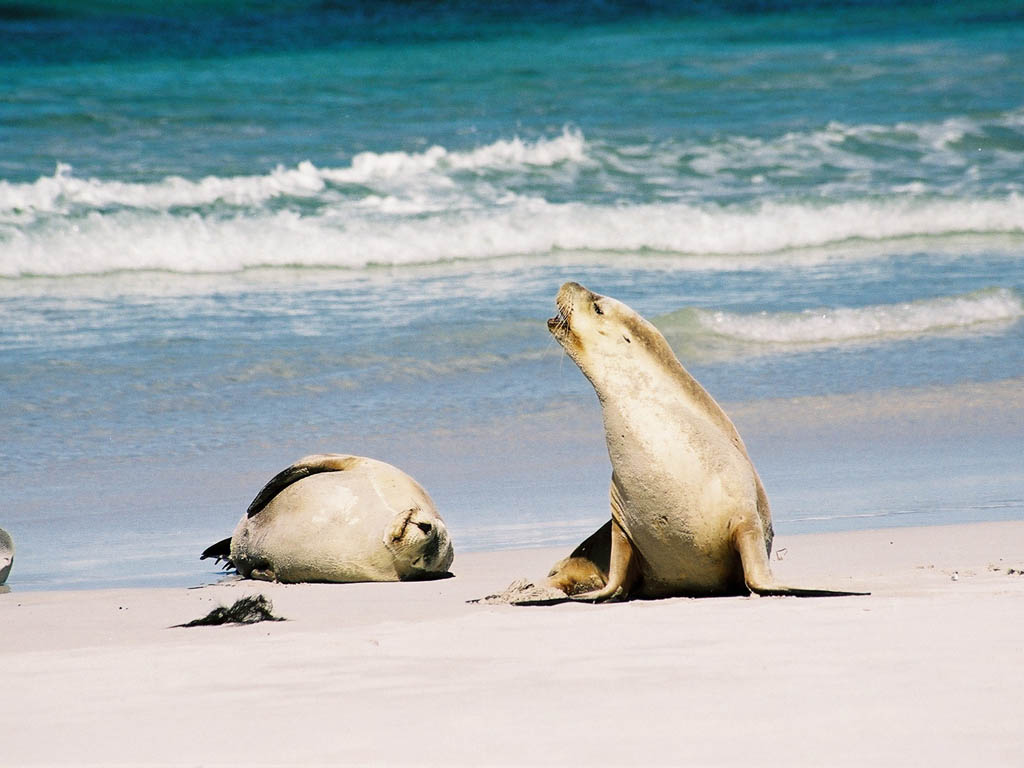
An Australian sea lion vocalising

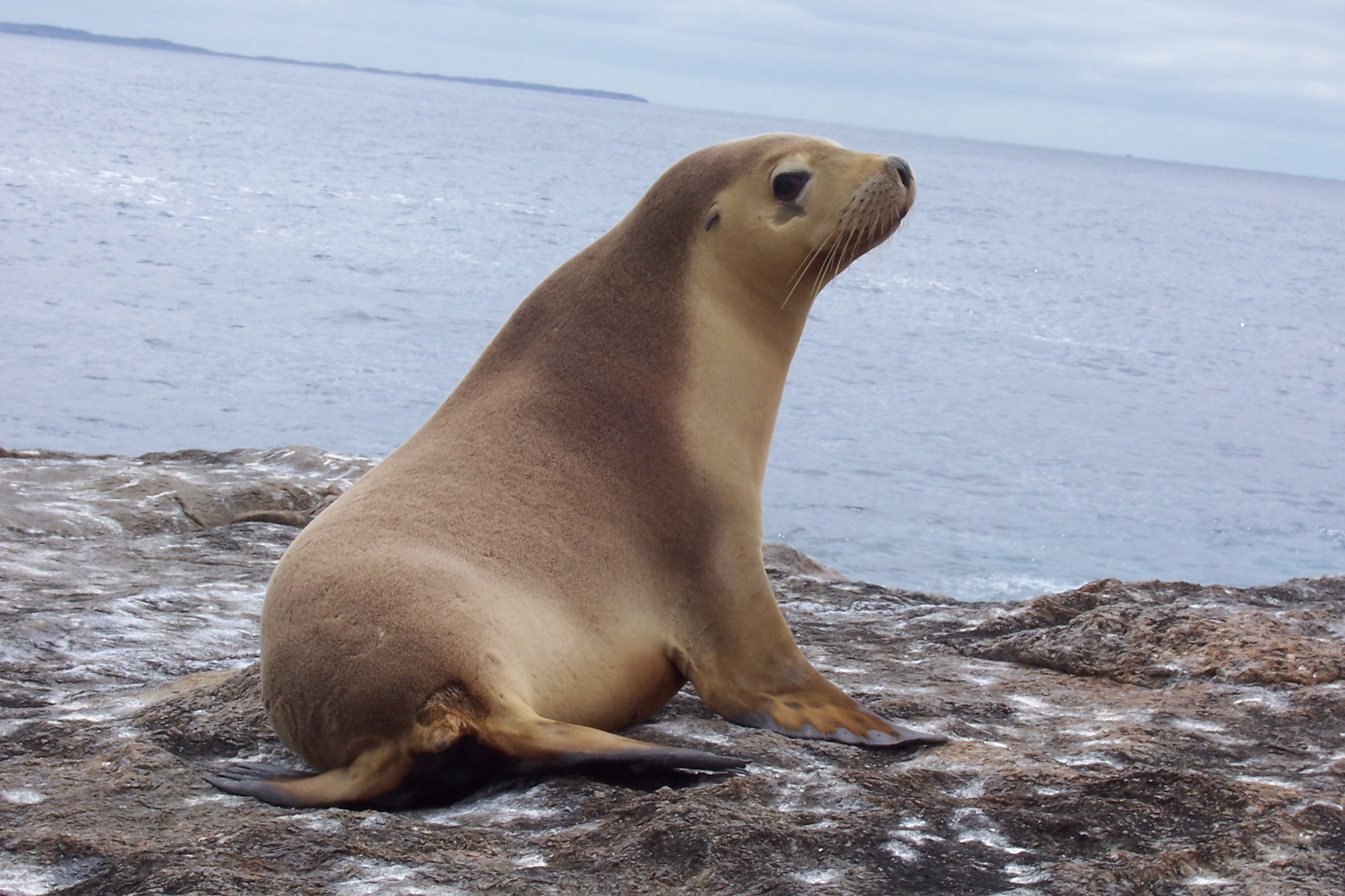
Female

In pinnipeds, mothers and pups are frequently separated throughout nursing, so are expected to have evolved an efficient individual recognition system. Consequentially, in Australian sea lions, as in many social mammals, mothers and their offspring can identify each other. Individual recognition produces mutual benefits by avoiding misdirected maternal care and energy expenditure for mothers, and the risk of injury for young approaching unrelated, potentially dangerous, adult females. Individual recognition can be accomplished with a combination of several sensory modalities, including olfaction, vision, and audition. The use of olfactory cues as a close-range recognition mechanism allows mothers to further confirm their pup's identity. In contrast to recent olfactory studies in pinnipeds, which showed the presence, but not a natural function of olfaction in pinnipeds, the present study shows that wild Australian sea lions use their olfactory abilities in a functional manner, by discrimination between the scents of their own offspring and nonfilial pups. However, in a dynamic, crowded colony, the acoustic channel seems to be the most reliable modality. For pinnipeds, neither visual nor olfactory cues are likely to be the primary modality for mother–pup recognition.

Male Australian sea lions were observed producing three different call types: A barking call, a bleating call, and a female-like call. The predominant call type produced by males of all ages was the barking call, which was similar in structure to the barking calls described in some other species of otariid in that it was a short sound produced repetitively in a series. Mature Australian sea lion males were found to emit the barking call in almost all social interactions, despite the existence of at least three call types in their vocal repertoire, plus a guttural threat and growl.

While Australian sealions have a reputation for curiosity and playfulness during interactions with humans, their bite (albeit rare) can require hospitalisation.

== Diet ==
Aerial view of an Australian sea lion (Neophoca cinerea) hunting a school of fish near Cape Solander, New South Wales, Australia

Australian sea lions have been described as opportunistic, benthic foragers. Limited stomach-content and faecal analyses have identified a wide variety of prey in the diet of the Australian sea lion, including teleost fish (including blue-throated wrasse and whiting), squid, cuttlefish, octopus, sharks (including Port Jackson sharks), rays, southern rock lobster, other small crustaceans, and little penguins. Regurgitate and stomach samples from Australian sea lions at Seal Bay contained hard parts consisting predominantly of benthic taxa. This supports previous evidence that this species forages primarily on neritic, benthic prey, many of which are nonmigratory. For the cephalopod component of the Australian sea lion diet, octopus and giant Australian cuttlefish made up the greatest biomass of prey taxa. Although the Australian sea lion feeds off seasonally available prey such as semelparous cephalopods, it also exploits prey species that are available throughout the year, such as southern rock lobster and many fish species.

Observations from the 1930s in Western Australian noted that Australian sea lions seemed to be subsisting on little penguins during the summer, and that their regular diet did not compete with commercial fisheries. Also in the 1930s, the animal was described informally as "rather fond of penguins". They were known to feed on little penguins in the 1960s.

== Predators ==
Adult Australian sea lions are eaten by great white sharks and killer whales (orca); pups are vulnerable to attack by other smaller shark species. Additionally, pups may be inadvertently killed by other animals, such as stingrays. The young and naïve sea lions may become overly curious or confident, possibly even hunting rays, and receive a lethal sting. The blue-ringed octopus may also spark a young animal's curiosity, a fatal error, with blue-ringed octopuses being among the most poisonous, deadliest cephalopods. They may also be killed by larger male sea lions and fur seals, if they are smaller, weaker, or alone and vulnerable.

== Breeding behaviour ==
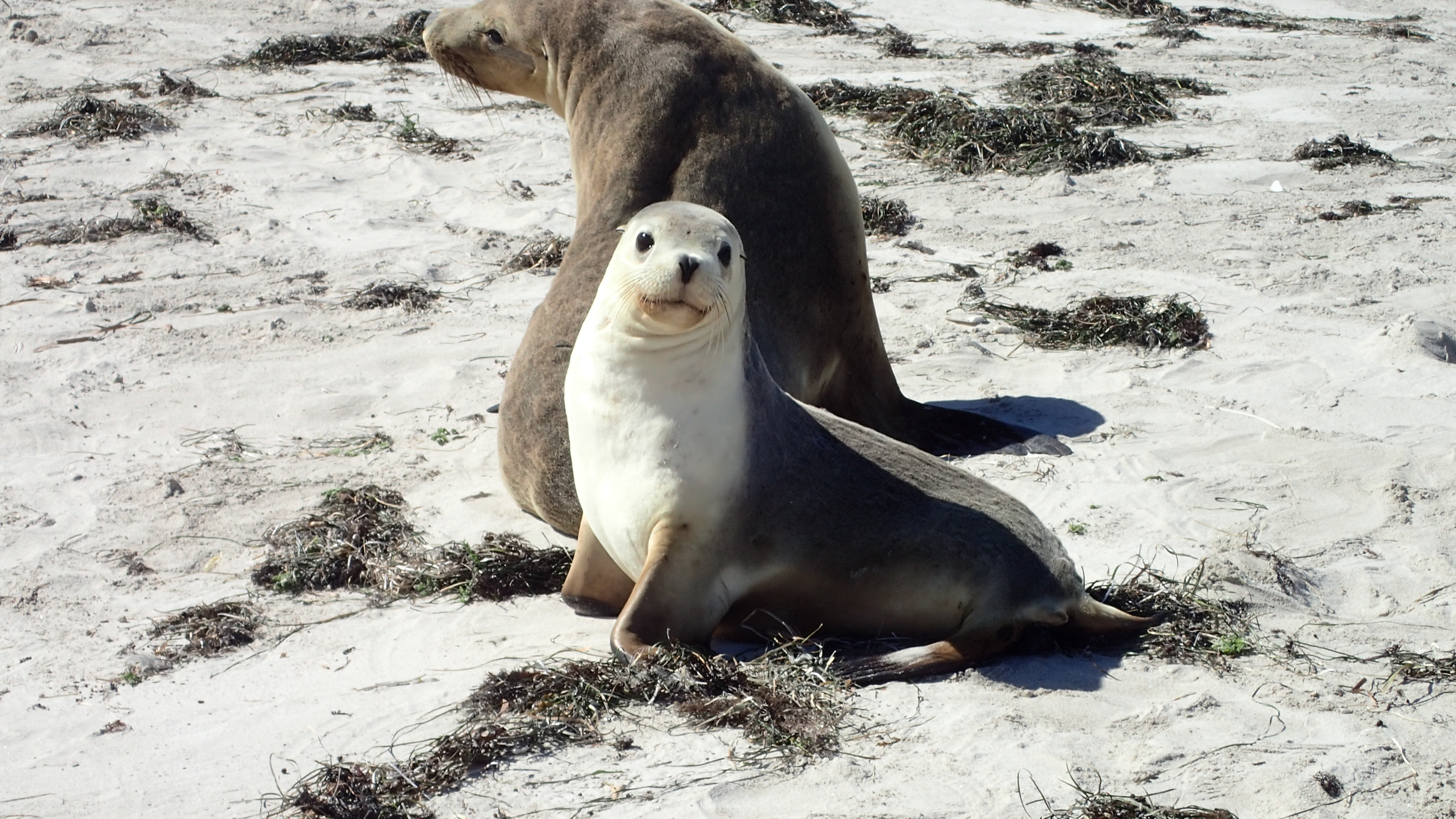
Sea lion mother and pup, Pearson Island, South Australia

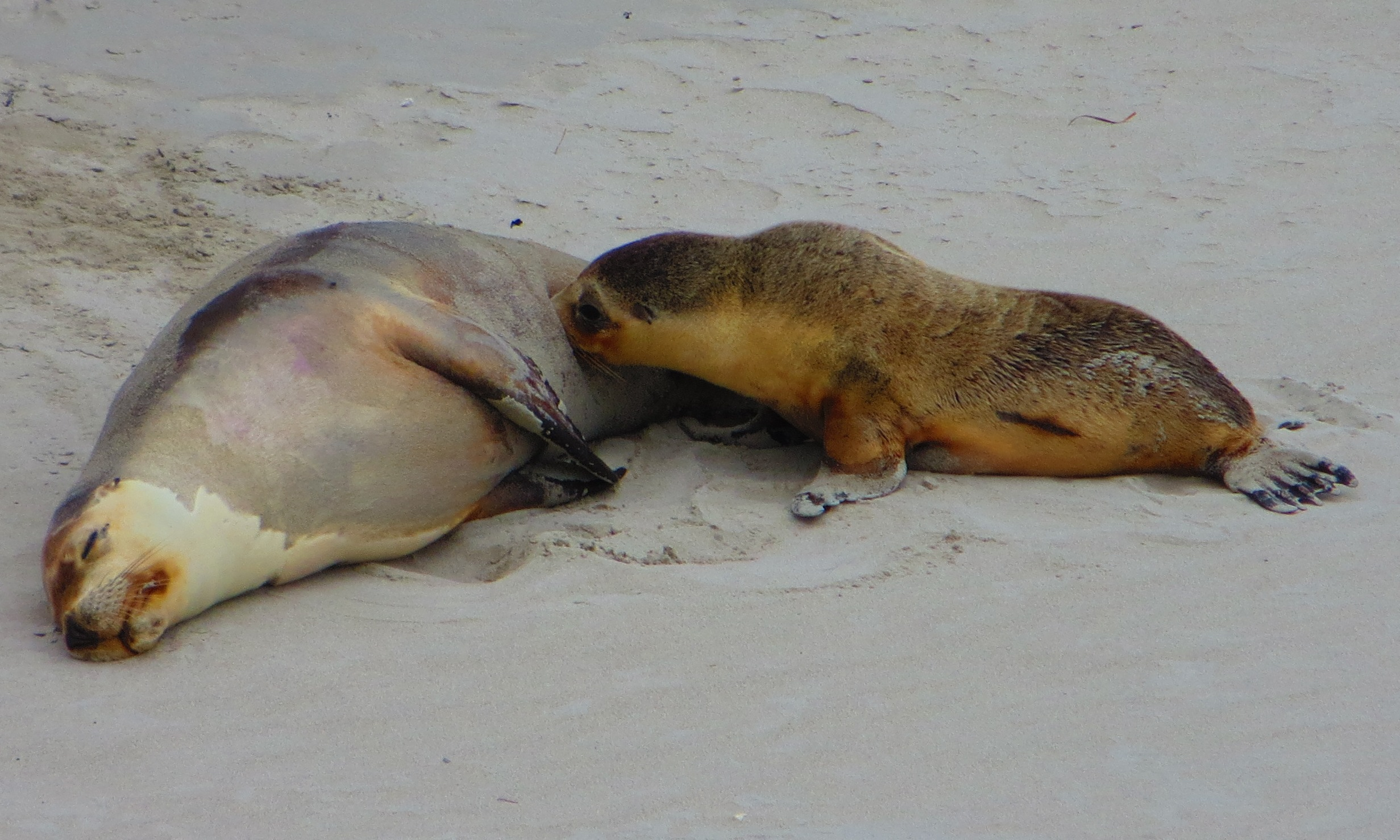
Female Australian sea lion nursing pup at Seal Bay Conservation Park, Kangaroo Island, South Australia

As of 2020, 66 breeding colonies have been identified: 28 in Western Australia and 38 in South Australia. The animals breed on at least 50 islands, 27 in Western Australia and 23 in Southern Australia. Prior to a study that took place from 1987 to 1992, 31 of the 50 island breeding sites had not been previously reported, and 19 more islands were considered potential breeding grounds. On the basis of surveys conducted primarily in 1990, about 70% of the population was in Southern Australia and 30% in Western Australia. Pup production was estimated at 2,432 for these 50 islands in 1990. In 1994 and 1995 another 10 breeding colonies were recorded on the mainland in the Great Australian Bight region, only producing 161 pups. Reproduction is yielding fewer and fewer pups per breeding season. The four largest colonies, on The Pages Islands, at Seal Bay on Kangaroo Island, and at Dangerous Reef, produced 42% of the total pup numbers; they are at the eastern end of the range, east of Port Lincoln.

The breeding cycle of the Australian sea lion is unusual within the pinniped family. It is a 17.6- to 18-month cycle and is not synchronised between colonies. However, census data collected since 1973 show that breeding events shift forward in time to 13.8 days earlier every 18 months. The duration of the breeding season can range from five to seven months and has been recorded for up to nine months at Seal Bay on Kangaroo Island.

Bulls do not have fixed territories during the breeding season. The males fight other males from a very young age to establish their individual positions in the male hierarchy, and during the breeding season, dominant males guard females for the right to breed with her when she comes into oestrus. A female comes into season for about 24 hours within 7 to 10 days after she has given birth to her new pup. She will only look after the new pup and generally fights off the previous season's pup if it attempts to continue to suckle from her. Male Australian sea lions are also known to kill young as an act of defence of territory.

Australian sea lions also practice alloparental care, in which an adult may adopt the pup or pups of another. This might take place if the original parents die or are for some reason separated from them. This behaviour is common and is seen in many other animal species such as the elephant and fathead minnow.

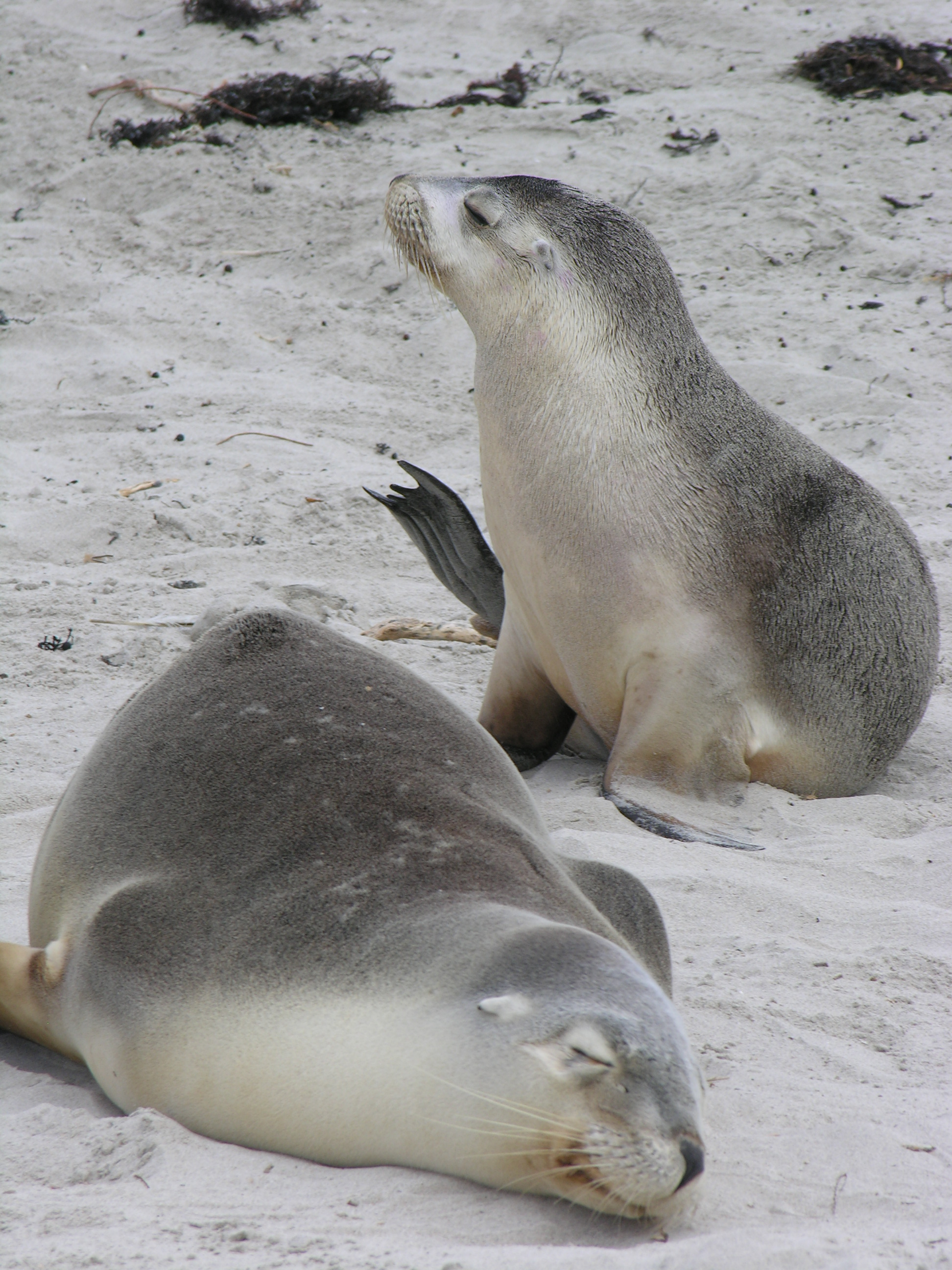
Sea lions on Kangaroo Island beach

== Population ==
In 2010, an estimated 14,730 Australian sea lions existed. By 2014, the population was listed at an estimated 6,500 mature adult sea lions and continues to decrease, if assuming the adult population is more than half of the total. The population is listed as endangered on the IUCN Red List of Threatened Species. The Australian sea lion population is naturally disadvantaged when compared to other pinnipeds in Australia. Its long and complicated breeding cycle, the high site fidelity of females, and high mortality rates all make the species more vulnerable to extinction.

Jones Island, west of Eyre Peninsula in South Australia, is one of the few sites where the population is not decreasing. In 2019, it was declared a "prohibited area" to eliminate human disturbance to the colony while landed.

In 2018, aerial drones were being used to search for, discover, and measure colonies of Australian sea lions along the Nullarbor Plain. Previously, surveying these areas was limited to the use of binoculars and peering down 60-metre-high cliffs to view the rocks below.

As of October 2025, an estimated 80 per cent of the species live in South Australian waters.

== Interactions with humans ==
Australian sea lions should only be approached in the company of a park ranger. They may exhibit defensive behavior, including biting. Sea lions have historically been captured from the wild and held in captivity in various zoos and aquaria, including Marineland of South Australia.

=== Hunting ===
Sea lions were heavily hunted following European settlement, which greatly reduced their numbers. Large-scale hunting ceased in the 1920s, but some killing and trade in "hair seal" skins continued. No baseline population data exist, but the species population and range have both decreased.

Sea lions on Dangerous Reef were shot and butchered for use as shark bait during the 1960s and 1970s. Between 1964 and 1975, conservationist Valerie Taylor saw the colony there reduce from over 200 animals to between 60 and 80 animals based on her own population counts in both years. She described noticing the difference in the animals' response to humans from her early visit in the 1960s to her follow-up in the 1970s, when the animals on both Dangerous Reef and Hopkins Island demonstrated fear of humans. In the 1980s, Australian sea lions were entangled in gill nets, after which fishers shot them and used them as shark bait.

Major threatening processes in the 20th and 21st centuries were primarily interactions with commercial fishing gear and illegal shooting. Entangled animals can sometimes be found and treated successfully.

Secondary threats include marine fish aquaculture (including loss of habitat, entanglement, and direct killing), disease, pollution, oil spills and noise, particularly from seismic surveys, construction, or marine operations.

=== Illegal shooting ===
Illegal shootings have been reported in both South Australia and Western Australia. Dead animals with gunshot wounds have been found at Cheynes Beach, Albany, near Port Wakefield in South Australia and at other locations. Some killings have led citizens to start petitions demanding thorough investigation. The shooting of a male Australian sea lion, which had hauled out at Port Macdonnell in 2013 by government employees without a prior veterinary assessment, was criticised by animal-rescue workers and the general public. In March 2021, a male Australian sea lion was shot and killed with a longbow at Bales Beach, Kangaroo Island.

=== Shark fishery ===
Australian sea lions are caught as bycatch by the southern and eastern scalefish and shark fishery. Following the closure of the commonwealth gillnet fishery in southern Spencer Gulf in 2001, pup production increased at Dangerous Reef (within Spencer Gulf) and that population began to recover.

Researchers estimated that while the fishery was operating, 374 Australian sea lions were killed by the fishery each breeding cycle. While most sea lion bycatch occurred close to breeding colonies, some occurred as far as 130 km away. In 2011, Humane Society International lobbied for the trigger figure for the closure of the fishery of 104 Australian sea lion deaths to be lowered.

Some Australian sea lions have drowned after becoming entangled or trapped in southern rock lobster pots and gear. Commercial fishers have also illegally shot and killed Australian sea lions, which they believed were competing with their fishery.

=== Long lactation period ===
The transition for young mammals from dependence on milk to independent foraging can lead to increased risk of natural mortality. The Australian sea lion demonstrates one of the longest lactation periods in pinnipeds, and pups begin diving before they are weaned. Adults work hard to forage at the seabed, demonstrating high field metabolic rates, and spending 58% of time at sea diving and 35% of time at sea on or near the bottom. Juveniles spend 67% of time at sea diving and 44% of time at sea on or near the bottom. Although many air-breathing vertebrates dive well within their estimated limit of oxygen stores, Australian sea lion adults and juveniles appear to operate close to their physiological maxima. The prolonged dependency period could provide extensive opportunities for foraging lessons, while the extreme diving behaviour required in the Australian sea lions' environment might necessitate it. Alternatively, female harbour seals accompanying pups might demonstrate reduced foraging efficiency, hence the metabolic demands of foraging for Australian sea may preclude lactating females from performing suboptimal dives with their young. This becomes a preventive measure to maintain a population and avoid a complete extinction. As a result of small population size, though, small breeding colony size, low reproductive rate, exposure to human activities, and evidence of population declines in some areas, Australian sea lions have recently been listed as threatened and vulnerable.

== Conservation status and management ==
Conservation listing and status
Jurisdiction	Legislation or Relevant List	Conservation Status	Population trend	Last assessed
Global	IUCN Red List of Threatened Species	Endangered	Decreasing	2014
Australia	EPBC Act 1999	Vulnerable		2005
South Australia	National Parks and Wildlife Act 1972	Vulnerable		
Western Australia	Biodiversity Conservation Act 2016	Vulnerable		

The protection of breeding habitat for the Australian sealion has been a conservation priority since the early 20th century. In 1909, field naturalists lobbied for the protection of three critical breeding sites for the Australian sea lion: Dangerous Reef, The Pages, and the Casuarina Islets off Kangaroo Island. In 1918, the South Australian parliament debated the Birds and Animals Protection Bill, and the Legislative Council agreed that it would protect Australian sea lions from harm covering waters of Spencer Gulf, St Vincent Gulf, the Investigator Strait, Backstairs Passage, and to the mouth of the Murray River. The introduction of the South Australian National Parks and Wildlife Act 1972 prohibited the kidnapping, possession or harassment of Australian sea lions statewide.

In 2005, the Australian sea lion was listed as vulnerable under the commonwealth Environment Protection and Biodiversity Conservation Act 1999 and is similarly listed in each state across its range (South Australia and Western Australia). On 11 June 2013, a recovery plan for the Australian sea lion (Neophoca cinerea) was adopted by the minister for Sustainability, Environment, Water, Population, and Communities. The plan considers the conservation requirements of the species across its range and identifies the actions to be taken to ensure its long-term viability in nature and the parties that will undertake those actions. In November 2014, the species was assessed by the International Union for the Conservation of Nature as Endangered.

=== Specific threats ===
From March 2025, a harmful algal bloom caused by Karenia mikimotoi occurred along the coasts of South Australia, ongoing as of October 2025. Many marine animals are affected by the bloom, including the Australian sea lion. On 3 October 2025, the state and federal governments announced a $1.4 million program to protect the sea lions, of which 80 per cent live in South Australian waters.

=== Captive breeding ===
Some zoos and aquaria are participating in captive-breeding programs. In 2006, at least 41 pups reportedly had been born and raised in captivity since 1981. The species has been kept in aquaria since at least as early as 1965.

In 2015, an Australian sea lion juvenile was captured at Bletchley, near Strathalbyn, which is located on the River Angas at the southeastern edge of the Adelaide Hills and beginning of the Fleurieu Peninsula. The animal was going to be considered for holding in captivity.

=== Fisheries management ===
The Australian Fisheries Management Authority Commission finalised an Australian sea lion management strategy, which came into force on 30 June 2010. This included closures of waters around colonies, seasonal closures, increased observation of sea lion activity, and trials of modified fishing techniques and equipment. The strategy was designed to meet the commission's obligations under the Fisheries Management Act 1991 and the Environment Protection and Biodiversity Conservation Act 1999 ("EPBC Act") The strategy was expected to significantly reduce the impact of fishing in the southern and eastern scalefish and shark fishery (SESSF) on Australian sea lions and enable the recovery of the species, including all subpopulations.

Southern rock lobster fisheries in both South Australia and Western Australia use pots that feature special collars designed to prevent Australian sea lions from entering the pots, or spikes that act as a deterrent.

== Ecology ==
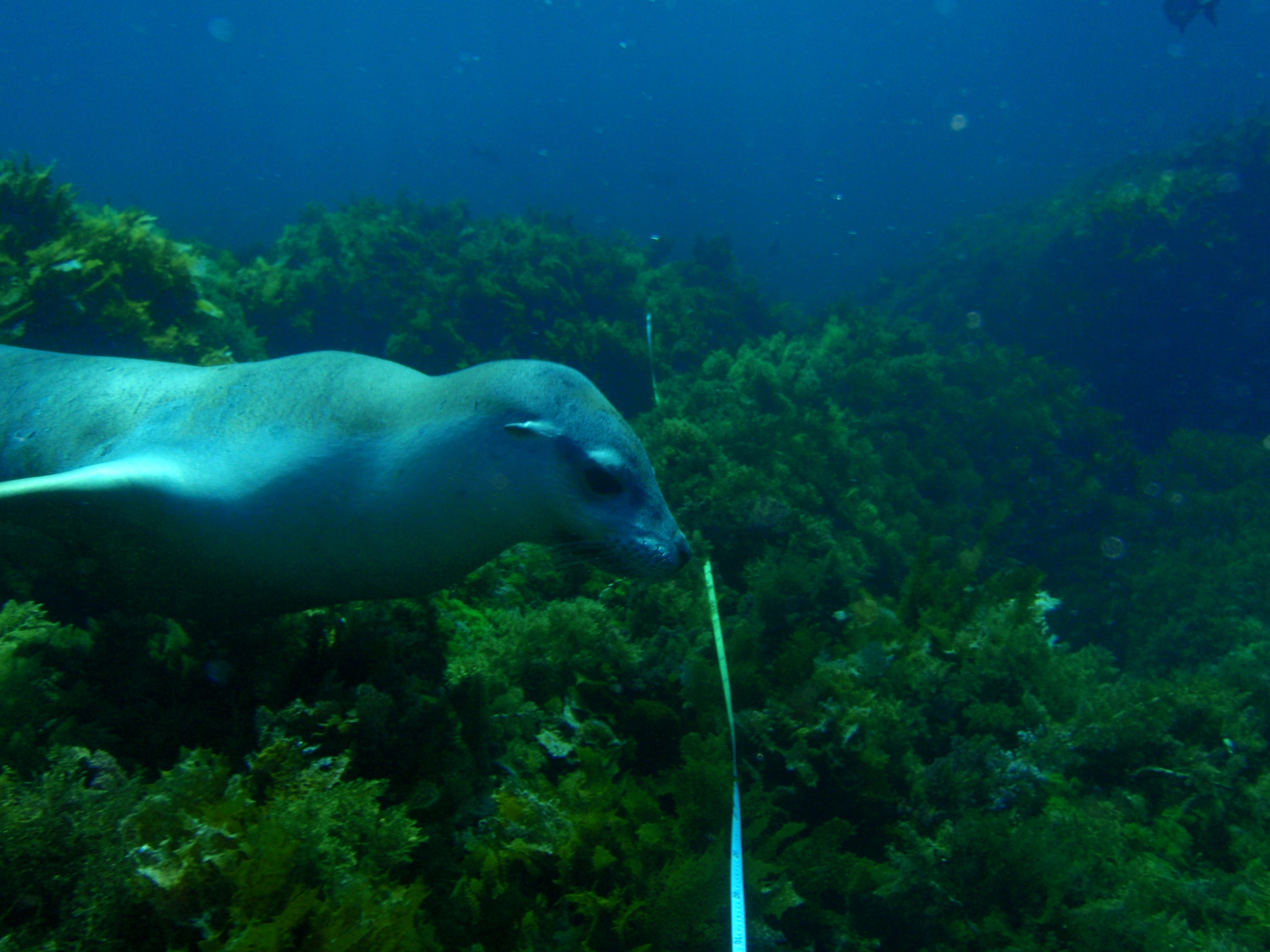
Australia sea lion off Pearson Island

Australian sea lions defecate nutrient-rich faeces, which may provide an important nutrient source for coastal ecosystems. Metagenomic analysis of the bacterial consortia found in the faeces of Australian sea lions had very high levels of nutrient cycling and transport genes, which may break down the nutrients defecated by sea lions into a bioavailable form for incorporation into marine food webs.

Diving behaviours indicate that the Australian sea lions worked extremely hard to exploit the benefits of their surrounding habitats. The typical Australian sea lion exceeds its calculated aerobic dive limit on 79% of dives. Australian sea lions spend 58% of time at sea diving and demonstrate high field metabolism, which allows the sea lions to maximise their time spent at or near the benthos, with 61% of each dive and 35% of their time at sea being spent at the deepest 20% of the dives. When diving, these animals are spending 57.9% of their time at sea spent at depths greater than or equal to 6 m, which can be considered as continuous diving. Seasonal variability in foraging energetics and dive behaviour is likely to be sensitive to regional oceanography, the maintenance costs of female sea lions and their offspring, and the distribution and behaviour of their prey.

The Australian sea lion exhibits strong site fidelity, with a foraging range of at most 300 km from their colony. Australian sea lions sometimes travel inland during tumultuous weather, and have been known to travel up to 9.4 km from the ocean.

== See also ==
- Uncinaria sanguinis, a hookworm parasite of the Australian sea lion
