= Seal Bay (Falkland Islands) =

Bay in East Falkland, Falkland Islands

Coordinates: 51°23′00″S 58°00′01″W

Seal Bay is a bay, about 1 km across, on the rugged and exposed north coast of East Falkland in the Falkland Islands of the South Atlantic Ocean. It lies some 40 km north-west of Stanley.

== Description ==
The valley behind the beach holds Swan Pond, a shallow wetland separated from the bay by a sandbar. The coastal vegetation consists of maritime heath and wet grassland overlying peat. Except on offshore stacks there is little remaining tussac.

=== Important Bird Area ===
Seal Bay has been identified by BirdLife International as an Important Bird Area (IBA). Birds for which the site is of conservation significance include Falkland steamer ducks, ruddy-headed geese, gentoo penguins (1500 breeding pairs), southern rockhopper penguins (15,000 pairs), Magellanic penguins, sooty shearwaters and white-bridled finches. Imperial and rock shags are present.
