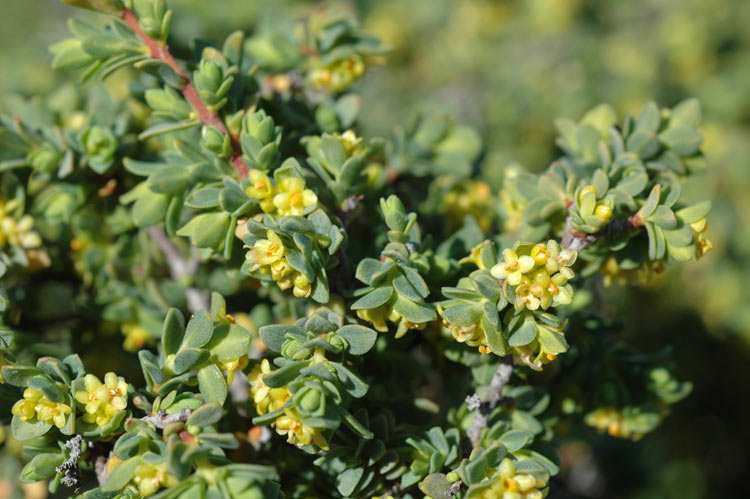
- At Point Lonsdale

Scientific classification
- Kingdom: Plantae
- Clade: Tracheophytes
- Clade: Angiosperms
- Clade: Eudicots
- Clade: Rosids
- Order: Malvales
- Family: Thymelaeaceae
- Genus: Pimelea
- Species: P. serpyllifolia

Binomial name
- Pimelea serpyllifolia R.Br.

Synonyms
- Banksia serpyllifolia (R.Br.) Kuntze; Pimelea serpillifolia F.Muell. orth. var.

= Pimelea serpyllifolia =

Species of plant

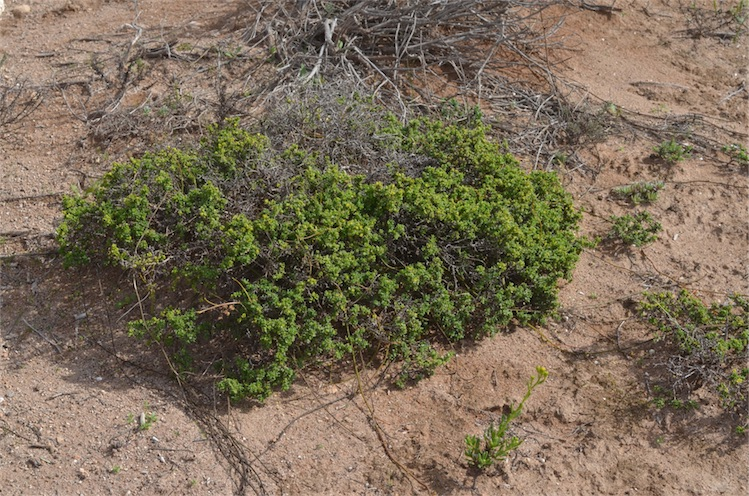
Habit in Cape Blanche Conservation Park

Pimelea serpyllifolia, commonly known as thyme riceflower, is a species of flowering plant in the family Thymelaeaceae and is endemic to southern Australia. It is an erect shrub with narrowly elliptic to spatula-shaped leaves, and compact heads of 4 to 12 yellow, yellowish-green or white flowers surrounded by 2 or 4 leaf-like involucral bracts. Male and female flowers are borne on separate plants.

== Description ==
Pimelea serpyllifolia is an erect shrub that typically grows to a height of 0.1–1.5 m (3.9 in – 4 ft 11.1 in), but is rarely stunted or prostrate in exposed positions. The leaves are borne in opposite pairs on glabrous stems and are crowded, narrowly elliptic to spatula-shaped, 4–12 mm (0.16–0.47 in) long and 2–4 mm (0.079–0.157 in) wide. The leaves are glabrous, and the same shade of green on both sides. The flowers are borne in compact heads of 4 to 12 yellow, yellowish-green or white flowers surrounded by 2 or 4 sessile, elliptic involucral bracts 2–6 mm (0.079–0.236 in) long and 1–4 mm (0.039–0.157 in) wide, female and male flowers borne on separate plants. The floral tube of female plants is 1.5–2.5 mm (0.059–0.098 in) long, the sepals 0.8–1 mm (0.031–0.039 in) long, and of male plants 1.8–2.5 mm (0.071–0.098 in) and 1.0–1.7 mm (0.039–0.067 in) long respectively.

== Taxonomy ==
Pimelea serpyllifolia was first formally described in 1810 by Robert Brown in his Prodromus Florae Novae Hollandiae et Insulae Van Diemen. The specific epithet, serpyllifolia means "wild thyme-leaved".

In 1988, Barbara Lynette Rye named two subspecies of P. serpyllifolia in the journal Nuytsia, and the names are accepted by the Australian Plant Census:

- Pimelea serpyllifolia subsp. occidentalis Rye differs from the autonym in having stems that are hairy below the flower heads, and flowers that are at least sparsely hairy inside.
- Pimelea serpyllifolia Rye subsp. serpyllifolia has glabrous stems and flowers that are usually glabrous inside.

== Distribution and habitat ==
Subspecies serpyllifolia grows in shrubland and woodland mostly in near-coastal areas of Victoria and South Australia, but also in the far north-west of Victoria. There are also small populations near Euston in far south-western New South Wales, near Eucla in Western Australia, and in a few places in north-eastern Tasmania and on Bass Strait Islands. Subspecies occidentalis grows in near-coastal areas between Israelite Bay and Twilight Cove in southern Western Australia.

== Conservation status ==
Pimelea serpyllifolia subsp. serpyllifolia is listed as "endangered" in New South Wales under the New South Wales Government Biodiversity Conservation Act 2016.
