= Nobby Islet =

Island in South Australia

Coordinates: 36°00′S 137°17′E

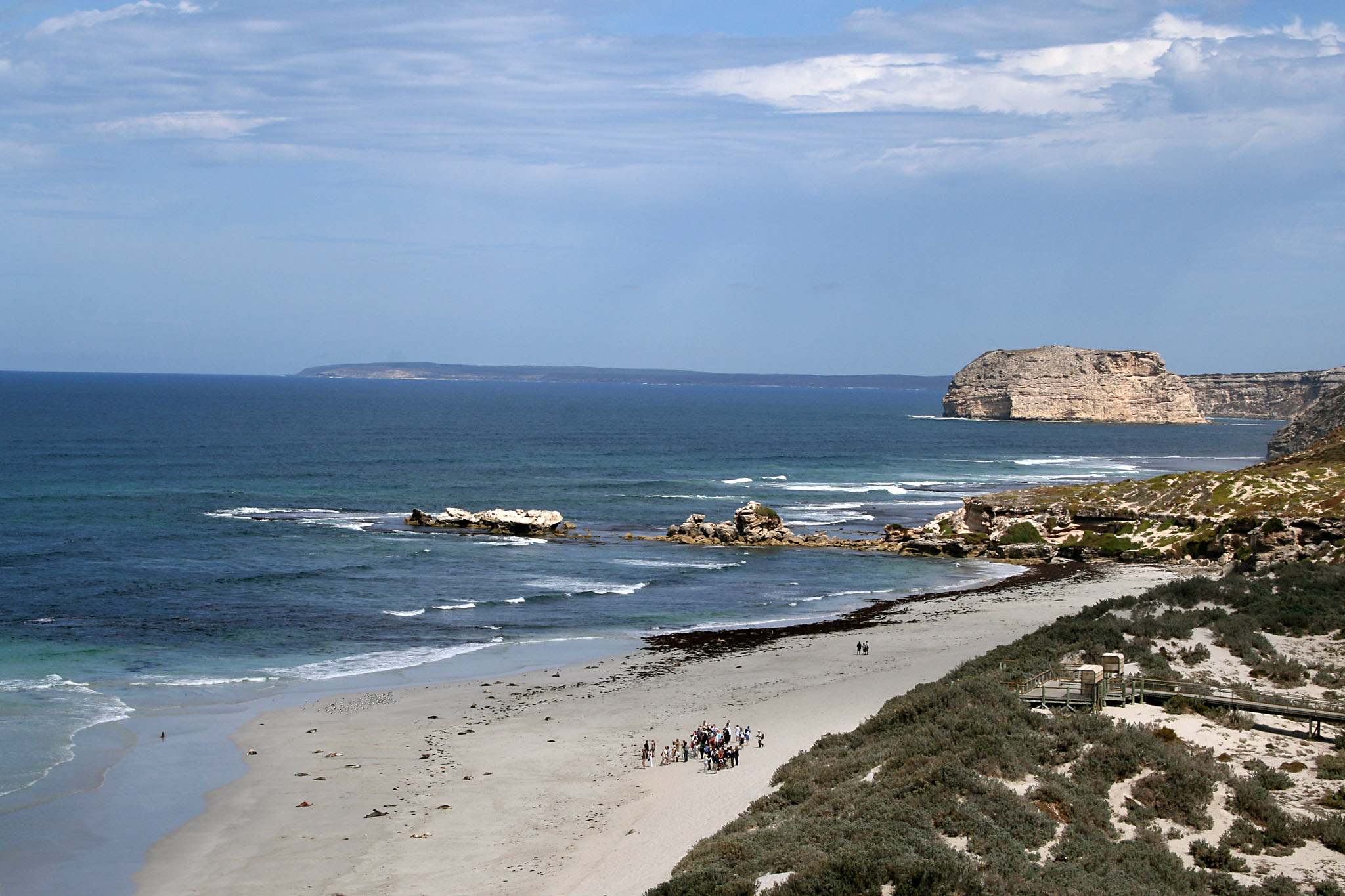
- View of Seal Bay looking west with Nobby Islet in background

- Location within South Australia

Geography
- Location: Great Australian Bight

Administration
- Australia

Nobby Islet (also known as Knobby Island and Nobby Island) is an islet located in the Great Australian Bight off the south coast of Kangaroo Island in the Australian state of South Australia approximately 50 kilometres (31 miles) south-west of Kingscote. It is currently part of the Seal Bay Conservation Park.

== Description ==
Nobby Islet is approximately 50 kilometres (31 miles) south-west of Kingscote and about 9.2 kilometres (5.7 miles) east of Point Ellen in Vivonne Bay and within 200 metres (660 feet) of the coast at Seal Bay. The islet is reported as being cylindrical in shape with almost vertical sides and finished with a flat top. It is 75 metres (246 feet) high and has an area of 12 hectares (30 acres). The islet is difficult to access due to its location in shallow water adjoining a cliffed coastline that exposed to rolling seas and the fragile condition of its vertical cliff faces. A survey carried out by the responsible government agency in 1996 used a helicopter to access the islet's summit.

== Formation, geology and oceanography ==
Nobby Islet may have been formed as recently as 6000 years ago due to the relatively shallow depth of the water surrounding it. As of 1996, the islet is reported as appearing to be entirely composed of a limestone known as Bridgewater Formation calcarenite. It is also observed that there was recent evidence of rockfalls due to the crumbly consistency of the calcarenite and that debris cones were present on its relatively sheltered northern side while any collapsed materials on its southern face had been washed away by wave action. The islet's summit was also reported as being 'gently terraced by resistant layers of calcrete that retain bands of sandy soil'. Nobby Islet is technically a sea stack. The islet is located in waters of a depth of about 5.5 metres (18 feet) that partially conceal wave-cut platforms and that are subject to rolling seas.

== Flora and fauna ==
As of 1996, the cliff faces were relatively un-vegetated. The islet's summit was occupied by clumps of Coast tussock-grass with a fringing shrubland dominated by coast daisy-bush. The 25 other species were identified including Dry land Tea-tree, Coast Beard-heath, Common correa, Cotton bush, Thyme Riceflower, pointed twinleaf, Black-anther Flax Lily, Common Wallaby Grass and Downy Dodder-laurel. The only animal life observed in 1996 was an Osprey nest located on the islet's northern side, white-faced storm petrels which were nesting in shallow burrows located over the entire summit and two species of lizard - the marbled gecko and the bull skink.

== Protected areas status ==
Nobby Islet originally obtained protected area status as a fauna reserve under the former Fauna Conservation Act 1964 and then as a fauna conservation reserve declared under the Crown Lands Act 1929-1966 on 16 March 1967. Since 1971, the waters surrounding the islet have been part of the Seal Bay Aquatic Reserve. As of 1996, it was described as being included in Seal Bay Conservation Park. As of 2012, the waters surrounding its shores are part of a restricted access zone located within the boundaries of the Southern Kangaroo Island Marine Park.
