= Cape Gantheaume Conservation Park =

Protected area in South Australia

- IUCN category Ia (strict nature reserve)
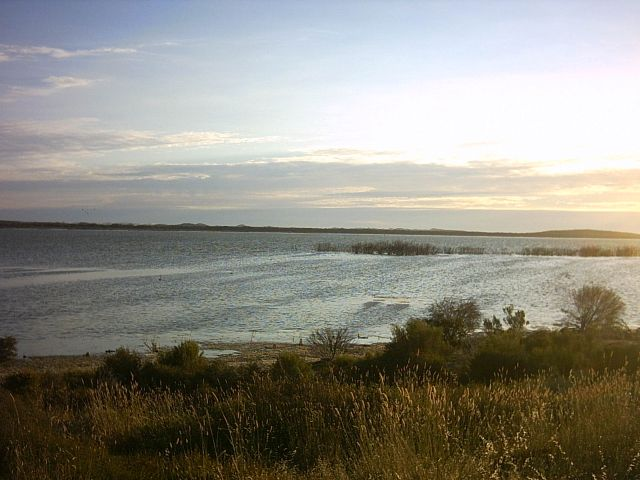
- Murray Lagoon seen from the Bald Hill lookout

- Location within South Australia
- Location: South Australia
- Nearest city: Kingscote
- Coordinates: 35°55′5″S 137°25′13″E
- Area: 4,213 ha (16.27 sq mi)
- Established: 21 January 1971
- Governing body: Department for Environment and Water
- Website: http://www.environment.sa.gov.au/parks/Find_a_Park/Browse_by_region/Kangaroo_Island/Cape_Gantheaume

Cape Gantheaume Conservation Park, formerly the Cape Gantheaume National Park, is a protected area in the Australian state of South Australia located on the south coast of Kangaroo Island. Attractions include Murray Lagoon and D'Estrees Bay. It also includes Pelorus Islet located about 7 kilometres (4.3 miles) southeast of Cape Gantheaume.

== Extent ==
As of 1993, the conservation park consists of the three following areas: a parcel of land on the west side of D'Estrees Bay, a parcel of land including both Murray's Lagoon and the land to its immediate south and Pelorus Islet, about 7 kilometres (4.3 miles) east south-east of Cape Gantheaume.

== History ==
The conservation park was first dedicated as a protected area in 1971 and then again in 1972 following the enactment of the National Parks and Wildlife Act 1972. In 1993, a large portion of the conservation park was excised and proclaimed as the Cape Gantheaume Wilderness Protection Area.

== Visitor services ==
Camping facilities are available at both Murray Lagoon and D'Estrees Bay. As of 2009, four dedicated walking trails are available at both Murray Lagoon and D'Estrees Bay. These are qualified as being "easy", "even surfaced..". and "suitable for small children".

== See also ==
- Protected areas of South Australia
- Caladenia tensa
