= Cape Gantheaume Wilderness Protection Area =

Protected area in South Australia

- IUCN category Ib (wilderness area)
- Location within South Australia
- Location: South Australia
- Nearest city: Kingscote
- Coordinates: 36°0′32″S 137°28′28″E
- Area: 200.99 km^{2} (77.60 sq mi)
- Established: 15 October 1993
- Governing body: Department for Environment and Water
- Website: http://www.environment.sa.gov.au/parks/Find_a_Park/Browse_by_region/Kangaroo_Island/Cape_Gantheaume

Cape Gantheaume Wilderness Protection Area is a protected area located on the south coast of Kangaroo Island in South Australia about 40 km (25 mi) south west of Kingscote. It was established in 1993 on land previously part of the Cape Gantheaume Conservation Park. The following qualities have been identified by the government agency managing the wilderness protection area:

The area is prime coastal wilderness with high ecological and aesthetic integrity. It is undulating country that has an excellent cover of mallee vegetation and diverse coastal landscapes with high scenic and habitat value. Wilderness quality is evaluated as high in all of the Wilderness Protection Area except a narrow strip on the east coast where it is affected to a minor extent by the presence of a rough track along the eastern coastline.

The wilderness protection area is located within the following gazetted localities (from west to east) - Seal Bay, MacGillivray and D'Estrees Bay. It is classified as an IUCN Category Ib protected area.

== See also ==
- Protected areas of South Australia
