= D'Estrees Bay =

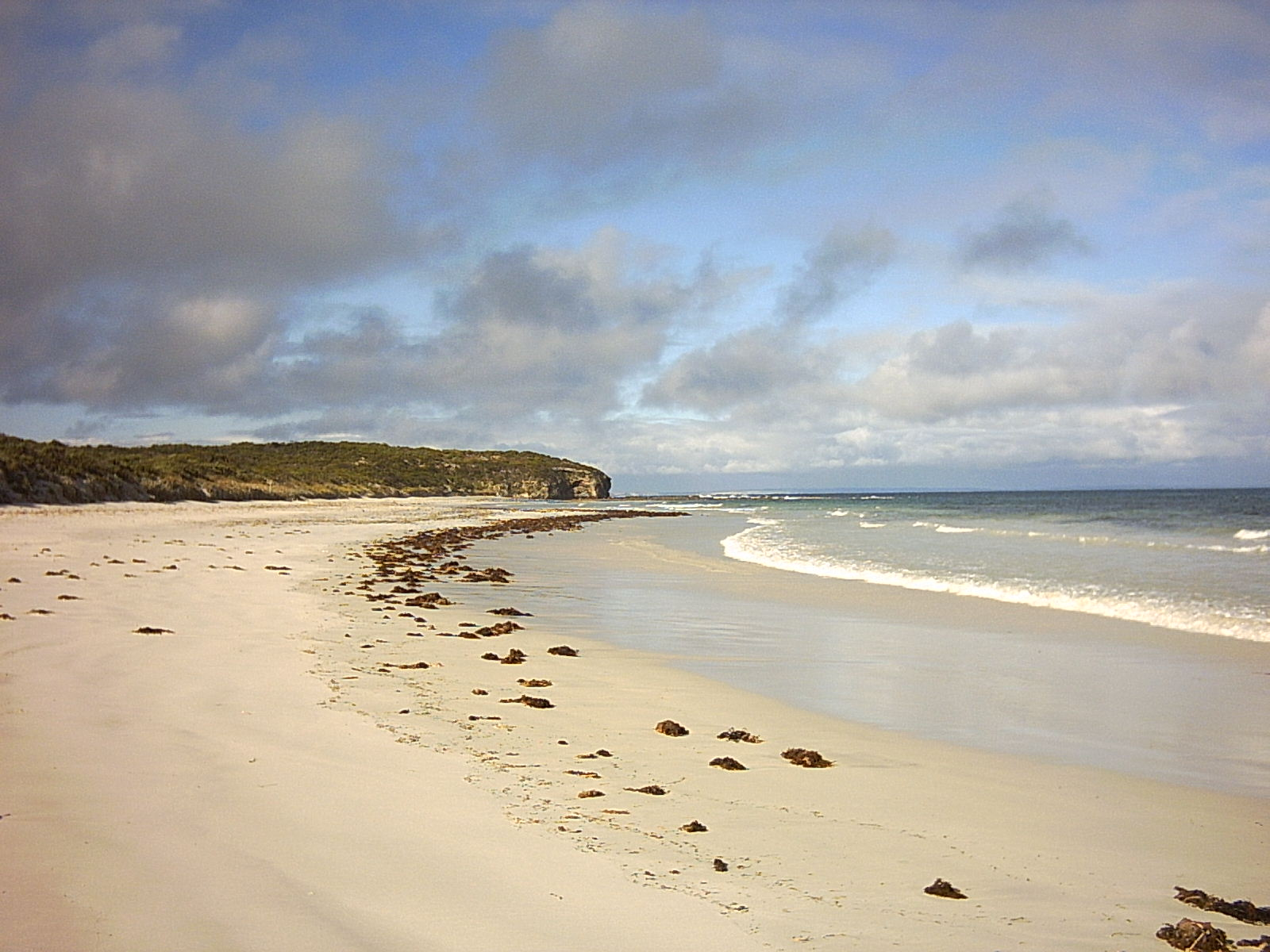

- Location in South Australia
- Location: Kangaroo Island, South Australia
- Coordinates: 35°55′00″S 137°39′02″E
- Type: Bay
- Basin countries: Australia
- Max. length: 14 km (8.7 mi)
- Max. depth: 27 m (89 ft)
- Settlements: Haines; D'Estrees Bay

D'Estrees Bay (French: Baie d'Estrées) is a bay in the Australian state of South Australia located on the southern coast of Kangaroo Island about 39 kilometres (24 miles) south of Kingscote, the island's principal centre.

D'Estrees Bay was named in 1803 by Péron and Freycinet of the Baudin expedition to Australia after Victor-Marie d'Estrées, a Marshal of France.

The bay extends from Point Tinline in the south west to Point Reynolds in the north east, with the beach being sandy and accessible for most of the bay's length.

The western side of the bay contains a settlement consisting of “single detached dwellings and recreation facilities for holiday makers and permanent residents.”

The land at the bay's south west end is currently part of the Cape Gantheaume Conservation Park.

== Shipwrecks ==
On the night of 25 November 1853 the steamer Osmanli, Captain Corbett, returning to Adelaide from Melbourne, struck a reef and sank in D'Estrees Bay. Some sixty persons were aboard, and all made it safely to shore in the boats, but passenger Morris Marks lost a quantity of gold.

== See also ==
- Estrées (disambiguation)
