= Seal Bay, South Australia =

Seal Bay
- Town
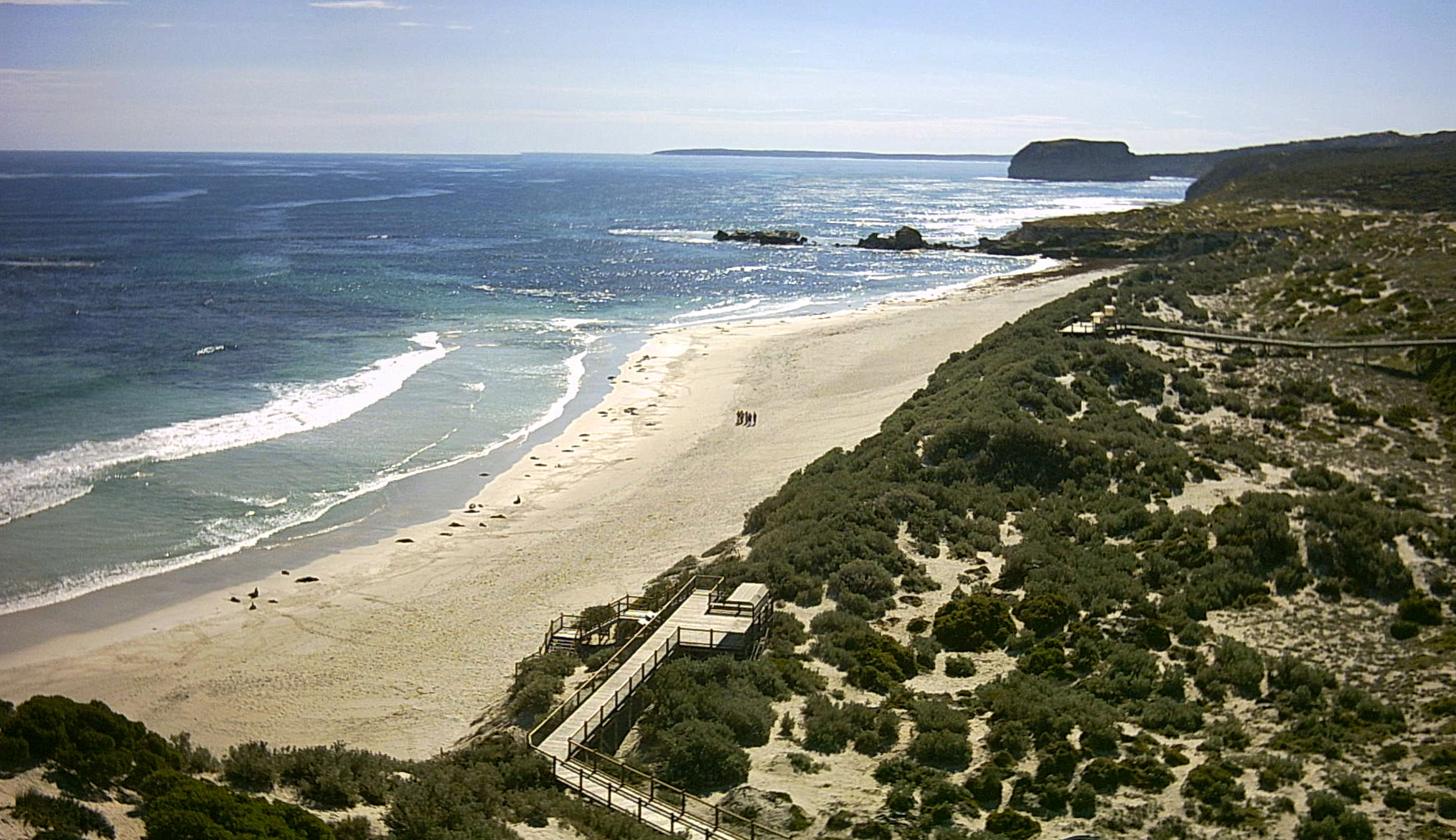
- View (looking west) from within the Seal Bay Conservation Park

- Coordinates: 35.957480°S 137.321610°E
- Country: Australia
- State: South Australia
- Region: Fleurieu and Kangaroo Island
- LGA: Kangaroo Island Council
- Location: 164 km (102 mi) south-west of Adelaide; 50 km (31 mi) south of Kingscote
- Established: 2002

Government
  - State electorate: Mawson
  - Federal division: Mayo

Population
  - Total: 7 (SAL 2021)
- Time zone: UTC+9:30 (ACST)
  - Summer (DST): UTC+10:30 (ACST)
- Postcode: 5223
- County: County of Carnarvon
- Mean max temp: 21.0 °C (69.8 °F)
- Mean min temp: 8.9 °C (48.0 °F)
- Annual rainfall: 444.0 mm (17.48 in)
Localities around Seal Bay
Seddon	Seddon	MacGillivray
Vivonne Bay	Seal Bay	MacGillivray
Ocean	Ocean	MacGillivray
- Location; Coordinates; Climate; Adjoining localities

Seal Bay is a locality in the Australian state of South Australia located on the south coast of Kangaroo Island overlooking the body of water known in Australia as the Southern Ocean and by international authorities as the Great Australian Bight. It is located about 164 kilometres (102 miles) southwest of the state capital of Adelaide and about 50 kilometres (31 miles) south of the municipal seat of Kingscote.

Its boundaries were created in 2002 in respect to "the long established name".

The majority land use within the locality is conservation while a smaller amount of land within the centre of the locality is zoned for agriculture. The former use consists of the full extent of the Seal Bay Conservation Park and part of the western end of the Cape Gantheaume Wilderness Protection Area which occupies part of the eastern side of the locality.

Seal Bay is located within the federal division of Mayo, the state electoral district of Mawson and the local government area of the Kangaroo Island Council.
