= Haystack Island =

Island in South Australia

Haystack
- Location within South Australia

Geography
- Location: Investigator Strait
- Coordinates: 35°19′19″S 136°54′26″E
- Length: 500 m (1600 ft)
- Width: 120 m (390 ft)
- Highest elevation: 43 m (141 ft)

Administration
- Australia

Haystack Island is an island located in Investigator Strait off the south coast of Yorke Peninsula in the Australian state of South Australia about 6 kilometres (3.7 miles) south-west of Stenhouse Bay. Since 1972, it has been part of the Althorpe Islands Conservation Park.

== Description ==
Haystack Island is about 6 kilometres (3.7 miles) south-west of Stenhouse Bay. It is described as ‘a narrow wall of sheer cliffs, undermined, indented and marked by fresh scars and rockfalls’ and that ‘has been eroded to a series of tall lobes connected by thin necks of rock that narrow to an almost knife-edge ridge’. It is surrounded by a ‘fringing wave-cut reef’. The island is about 500 metres (1,600 feet) long by a maximum width of about 120 metres (390 feet) and with the tallest lobe having a height of 43 metres (141 feet). Its long axis is aligned in a north-west to south-east direction.

Access is reported as best done in calm seas and that the summit ridge can be reached from the island’s east coast via a rubble cone of rubble, taking care when climbing the slope’s ‘loose and crumbling’ surface. A survey carried out in 1982 by the responsible government agency used a helicopter to access the island’s summit. A number of sources consider Haystack Island along with the Althorpe Islands and Seal Island to be a group of islands known as the Althorpe Islands Group.

== Formation, geology and oceanography ==
Haystack Island was formed about 7350 years ago after sea levels rose at the start of the Holocene thereby separating Yorke Peninsula from Kangaroo Island. Haystack Island consists of a seam of Bridgewater Formation calcarenite that sits on a largely submerged ridge of Gleesons Landing Granite. Haystack Island rises from a depth of 20 metres (66 feet) within 300 metres (980 feet) from its southern shore.

== Flora and fauna ==
=== Flora ===
A survey carried out in November 1982 found 11 species of plants making up a shrubland covering the island’s ridge including Grey Samphire, marsh saltbush, and Nitre-bush in the deeper soils, and Cushion-bush, Round-leaved Pigface and southern sea-heath in the shallower soils.

=== Fauna ===
A survey carried out in November 1982 reported evidence of the presence of the following vertebrate animals - the white-faced storm petrel by the presence of ‘shallow burrows’ used during the ‘summer breeding season’, Pacific gull by the existence of a ‘large midden of shell fragments was found on the highest dome, indicating a feeding site…’, and the white-bellied sea eagle by the presence of a ‘maintained nest’.

== Protected areas status ==
Since 1972, Haystack Island has been part of the Althorpe Islands Conservation Park. Since 2007, it has been a prohibited area where access is only allowed by permit in order to protect the breeding population of seabirds. Since 2012, the waters surrounding its shores are part of a habitat protection zone located within the boundaries of the Southern Spencer Gulf Marine Park.
