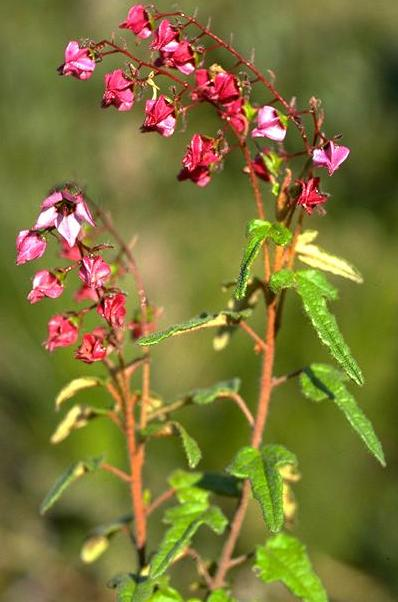

Scientific classification
- Kingdom: Plantae
- Clade: Tracheophytes
- Clade: Angiosperms
- Clade: Eudicots
- Clade: Rosids
- Order: Malvales
- Family: Malvaceae
- Genus: Lasiopetalum
- Species: L. glutinosum

Binomial name
- Lasiopetalum glutinosum (Lindl.) F.Muell.

Synonyms
- Rhynchostemon glutinosum Benth. orth. var.; Rhynchostemon glutinosus (Lindl.) Steetz; Thomasia glutinosa Lindl.

= Lasiopetalum glutinosum =

Species of shrub

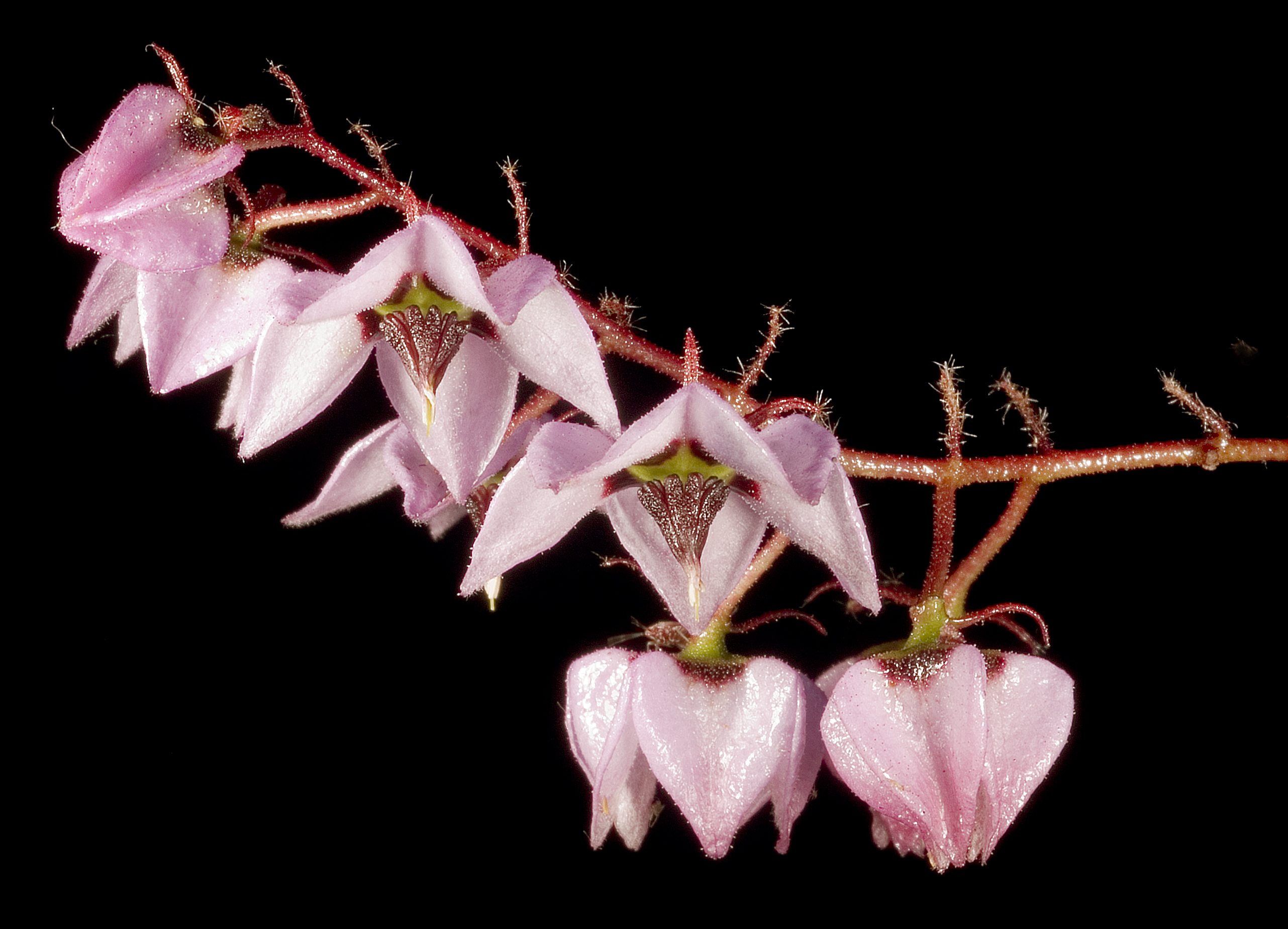
Flower detail

Lasiopetalum glutinosum is a species of flowering plant in the family Malvaceae and is endemic to the south-west of Western Australia. It is a spreading, multi-stemmed shrub with densely hairy young stems, egg-shaped leaves often with three lobes and bright pink or dark red flowers.

== Description ==
Lasiopetalum glutinosum is a spreading, multi-stemmed, sticky shrub that typically grows to 0.2–1 m (7.9 in – 3 ft 3.4 in) high and 0.2–1.5 mm (0.0079–0.0591 in) wide, its young stems covered with white and rust-coloured, star-shaped hairs. The leaves are egg-shaped, often with three lobes, mostly 10–53 mm (0.39–2.09 in) long and 3–44 mm (0.12–1.73 in) wide on a petiole 4.0–6.5 mm (0.16–0.26 in) long. Both surfaces of the leaves are covered with white and rust-coloured, star-shaped hairs. The flowers are borne in loose groups of two to twelve 38–111 mm (1.5–4.4 in) long, on a peduncle 22–49 mm (0.87–1.93 in) long, each flower on a pedicel 4.5–9 mm (0.18–0.35 in) long with narrowly egg-shaped to elliptic bracts 2.5–5.8 mm (0.098–0.228 in) long at the base and similar bracteoles 3.3–9 mm (0.13–0.35 in) long near the base of the sepals. The sepals are bright pink or dark red, the lobes egg-shaped and 4.3–8.5 mm (0.17–0.33 in) long and there are no petals. The anthers are dark red with a white tip and 3.5–5.8 mm (0.14–0.23 in) long. Flowering occurs from September to December.

== Taxonomy ==
This species was first formally described in 1839 by John Lindley who gave it the name Thomasia glutinosa in A Sketch of the Vegetation of the Swan River Colony. In 1881, Ferdinand von Mueller changed the name to Lasiopetalum glutinosum in Fragmenta Phytographiae Australiae. The specific epithet (glutinosum) means "sticky", referring to the flowers.

In 2015 Kelly Anne Shepherd and Carolyn F. Wilkins described two subspecies and the names are accepted by the Australian Plant Census:

- Lasiopetalum glutinosum (Lindl.) F.Muell. subsp. glutinosum has three-lobed leaves and scattered white hairs at the base of the sepals;
- Lasiopetalum glutinosum subsp. latifolium K.A.Sheph. & C.F.Wilkins has egg-shaped, or only shallowly lobed leaves, and dense, star-shaped hairs at the base of the sepals.

== Distribution and habitat ==
This lasiopetalum grows in open woodland and low scrub, subspecies glutinosum mostly on the Darling Scarp near Perth in the Avon Wheatbelt, Jarrah Forest, Swan Coastal Plain biogeographic regions and subspecies latifolium between Badgingarra and Boddington in the Avon Wheatbelt, Geraldton Sandplains, Jarrah Forest, and Swan Coastal Plain bioregions.

== Conservation status ==
Lasiopetalum glutinosum subsp. latifolium is listed as "not threatened" but subsp. glutinosum is listed as "Priority Three" by the Government of Western Australia Department of Biodiversity, Conservation and Attractions, meaning that it is poorly known and known from only a few locations but is not under imminent threat.
