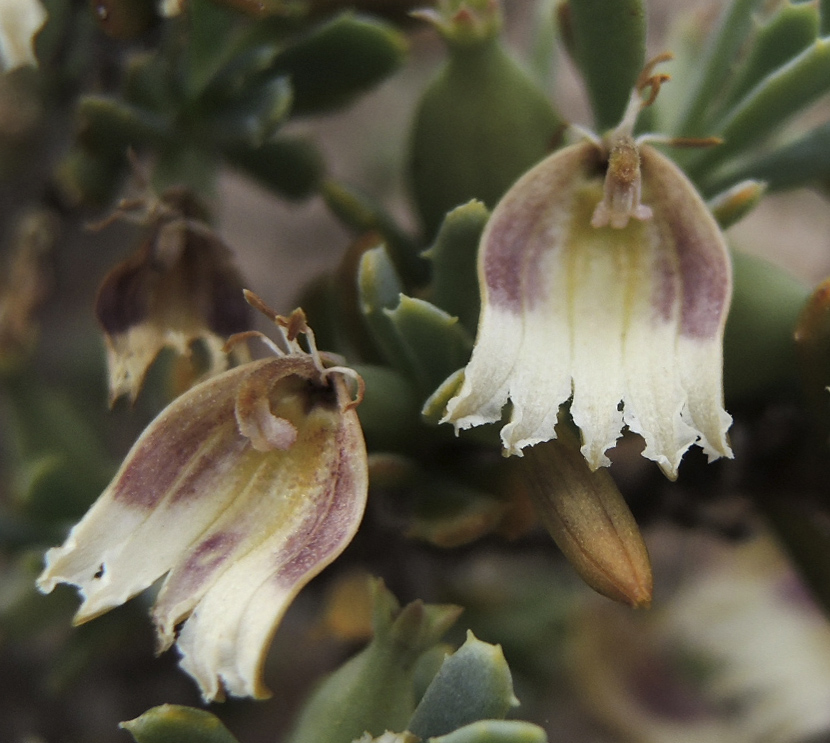

Scientific classification
- Kingdom: Plantae
- Clade: Tracheophytes
- Clade: Angiosperms
- Clade: Eudicots
- Clade: Asterids
- Order: Asterales
- Family: Goodeniaceae
- Genus: Goodenia
- Species: G. collaris

Binomial name
- Goodenia collaris (F.Muell.) K.A.Sheph.
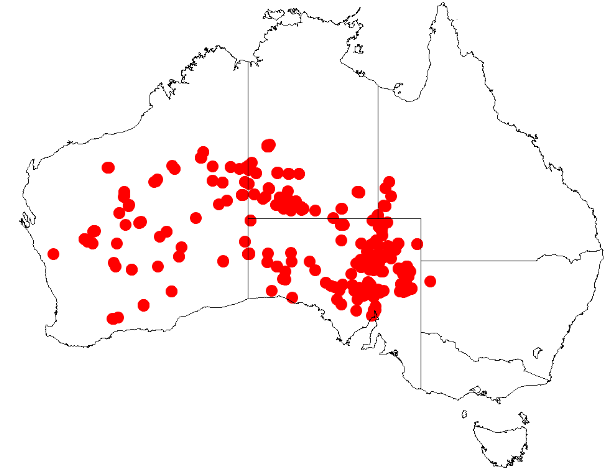
- Occurrence data from AVH

Synonyms
- Scaevola collaris F.Muell.; Scaevola decurrens W.Fitzg.

= Goodenia collaris =

Species of shrub

Goodenia collaris is a shrub in the family Goodeniaceae and its native range is five mainland states/territories of Australia: the Northern Territory, New South Wales, South Australia, Queensland and Western Australia.

It is an endangered species in New South Wales.

== Description ==
Goodenia collaris is an erect shrub, growing to 0.5 m. The stems are erect and smooth. The leaves are sessile (i.e., have no stalk), succulent and smooth, and 1–8.5 cm long by 1–9 mm wide. The flowers occur in terminal spikes or are solitary or clustered in the axils.

The sepals are ovate to triangular, smooth and almost free. The corolla is 6-17mm long, smooth on the outside with short hairs on the inside, and yellow to cream or mauve. The anthers are free. The ovary is inferior and from 5–20 mm long, is two-celled and usually has a beak and a foot.

It flowers mostly from May to November.

== Distribution and habitat ==
It is found on saline soils in the arid parts of the south of Western Australia, the south of the Northern Territory, South Australia, western Queensland and north-western New South Wales.

== Taxonomy ==
This species was first described in 1859 by Ferdinand von Mueller who gave it the name Scaevola collaris in the Votes and Proceedings of the Legislative Assembly of Victoria from specimens collected "on sand ridges near Wonnamulla". In 2020, Kelly Anne Shepherd transferred the species to Goodenia in the journal PhytoKeys. The specific epithet, (collaris) is a Latin word meaning 'having a collar'. The name Goodenia collaris is accepted by the WA herbarium.

== Gallery ==
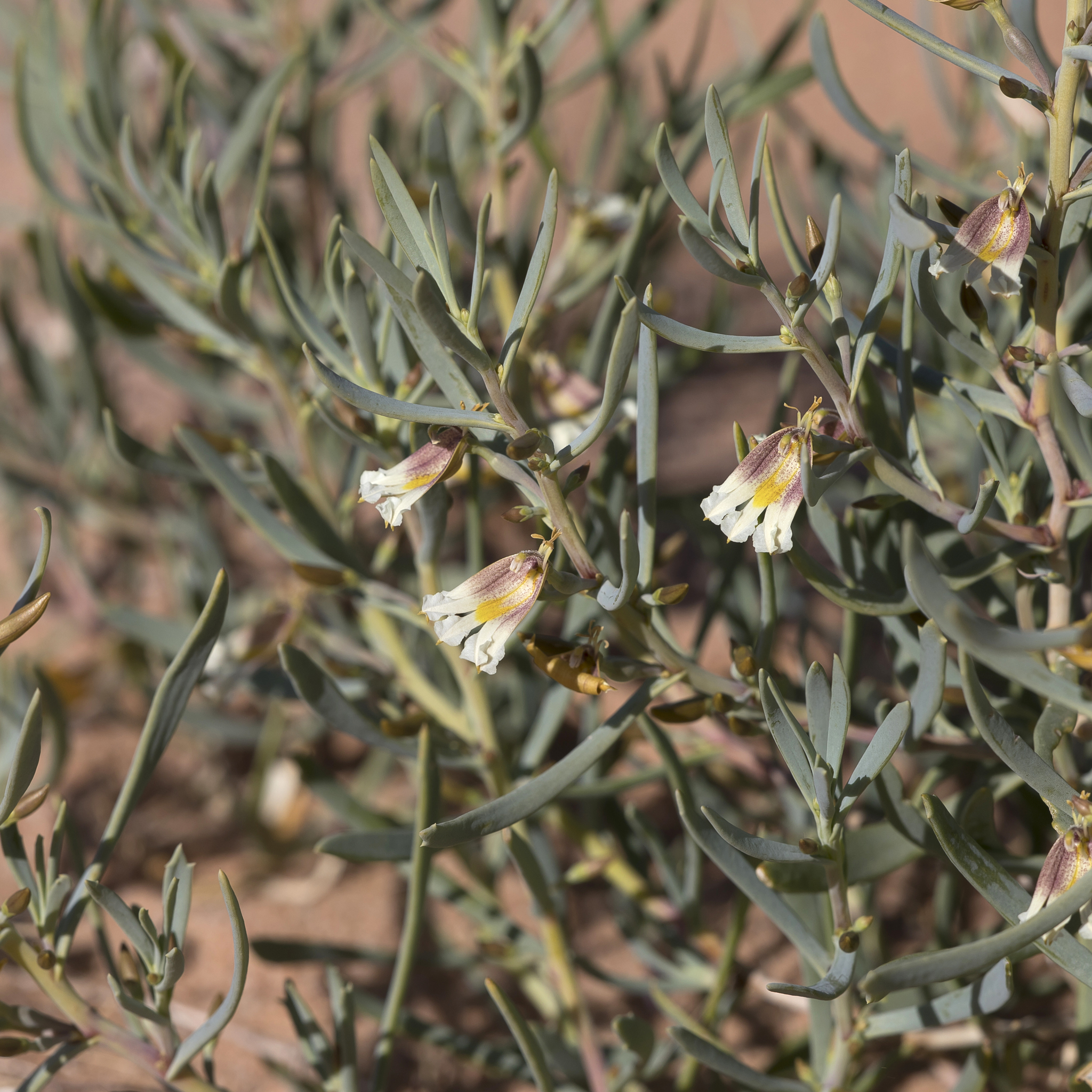

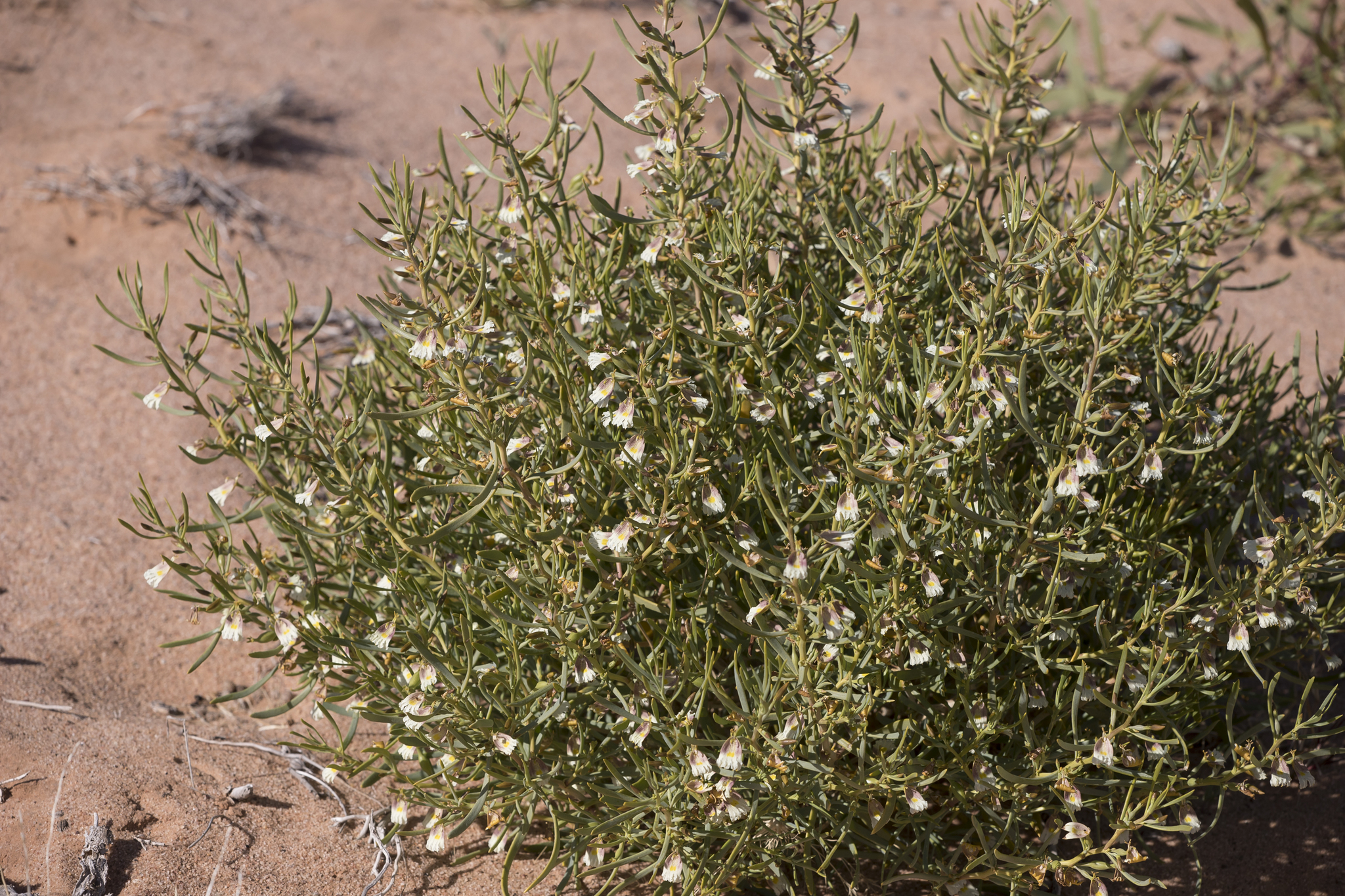
