= Tecticornia bibenda =

Scientific classification
- Kingdom: Plantae
- Clade: Tracheophytes
- Clade: Angiosperms
- Clade: Eudicots
- Order: Caryophyllales
- Family: Amaranthaceae
- Genus: Tecticornia
- Species: T. bibenda

Binomial name
- Tecticornia bibenda K.A.Sheph. & S.J.van Leeuwen

Species of flowering plant

Tecticornia bibenda is a species of plant in the subfamily Salicornioideae of the family Amaranthaceae from Western Australia. Its segmented stem gives it an appearance similar to the Michelin Man. T. bibenda ranked tenth in the top species of 2008 by the International Institute for Species Exploration.
