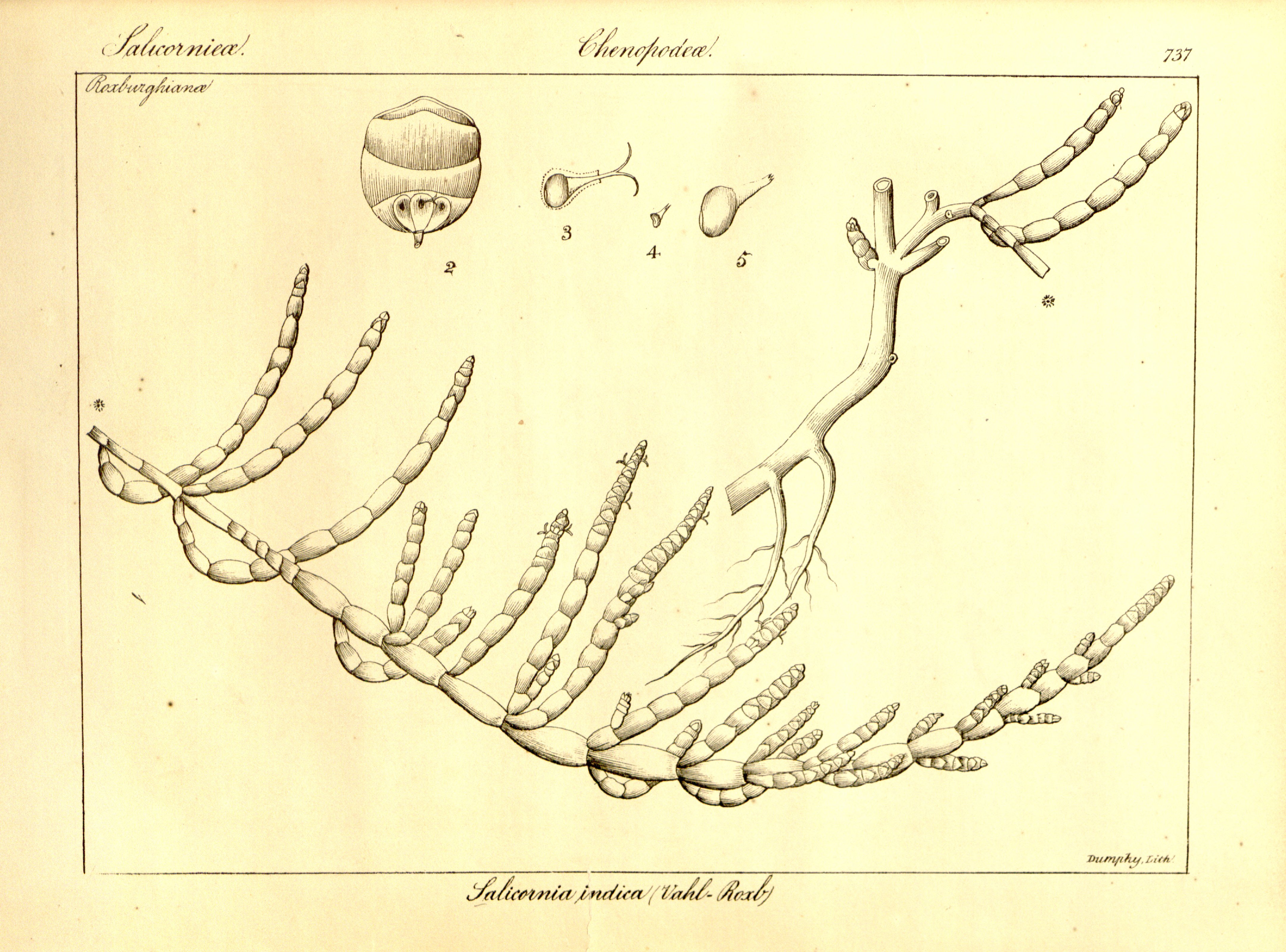

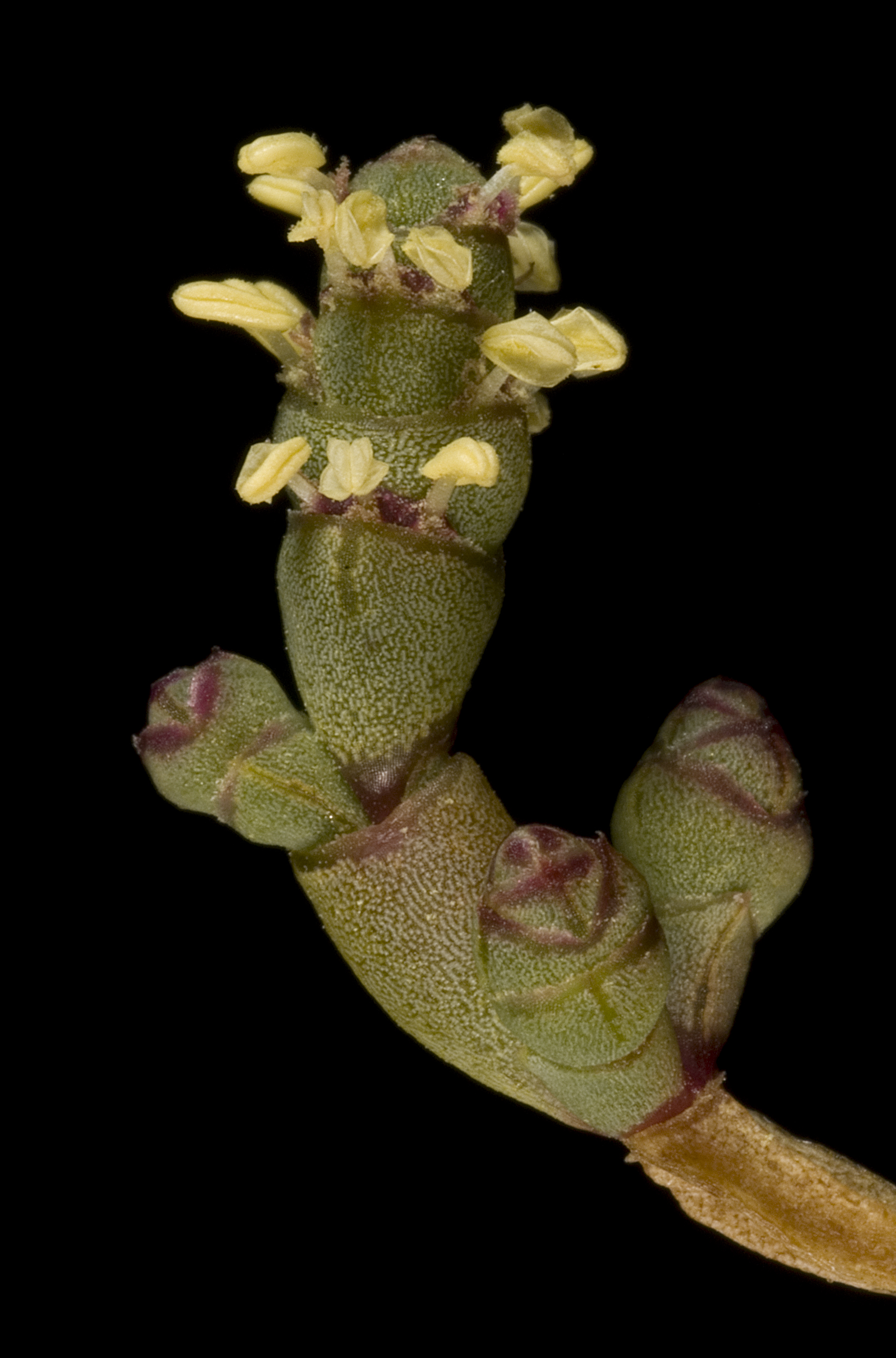

Scientific classification
- Kingdom: Plantae
- Clade: Tracheophytes
- Clade: Angiosperms
- Clade: Eudicots
- Order: Caryophyllales
- Family: Amaranthaceae
- Genus: Tecticornia
- Species: T. indica

Binomial name
- Tecticornia indica (Willd.) K.A.Sheph. & Paul G.Wilson

Synonyms
- Salicornia indica Willd.; Arthrocnemum indicum (Willd.) Moq.; Halosarcia indica (Willd.) Paul G.Wilson

= Tecticornia indica =

Species of flowering plant

Tecticornia indica is a species of plant that is succulent and halophyte (salt tolerant) which grows in salt marshes on tropical areas of the world. This plant belongs to the Chenopodiaceae, which are now included in family Amaranthaceae.

These plants lack leaves. Stem & branches are modified as main photosynthetic structures. The Stem is jointed. Flowers are said to be fine and present in scales. The fruit of this plant is round and green. Capsule is hard and it contains many seeds that are hairy. The seeds are dimorphic.

The Walmajarri people of the southern Kimberley call this plant Mungily.
