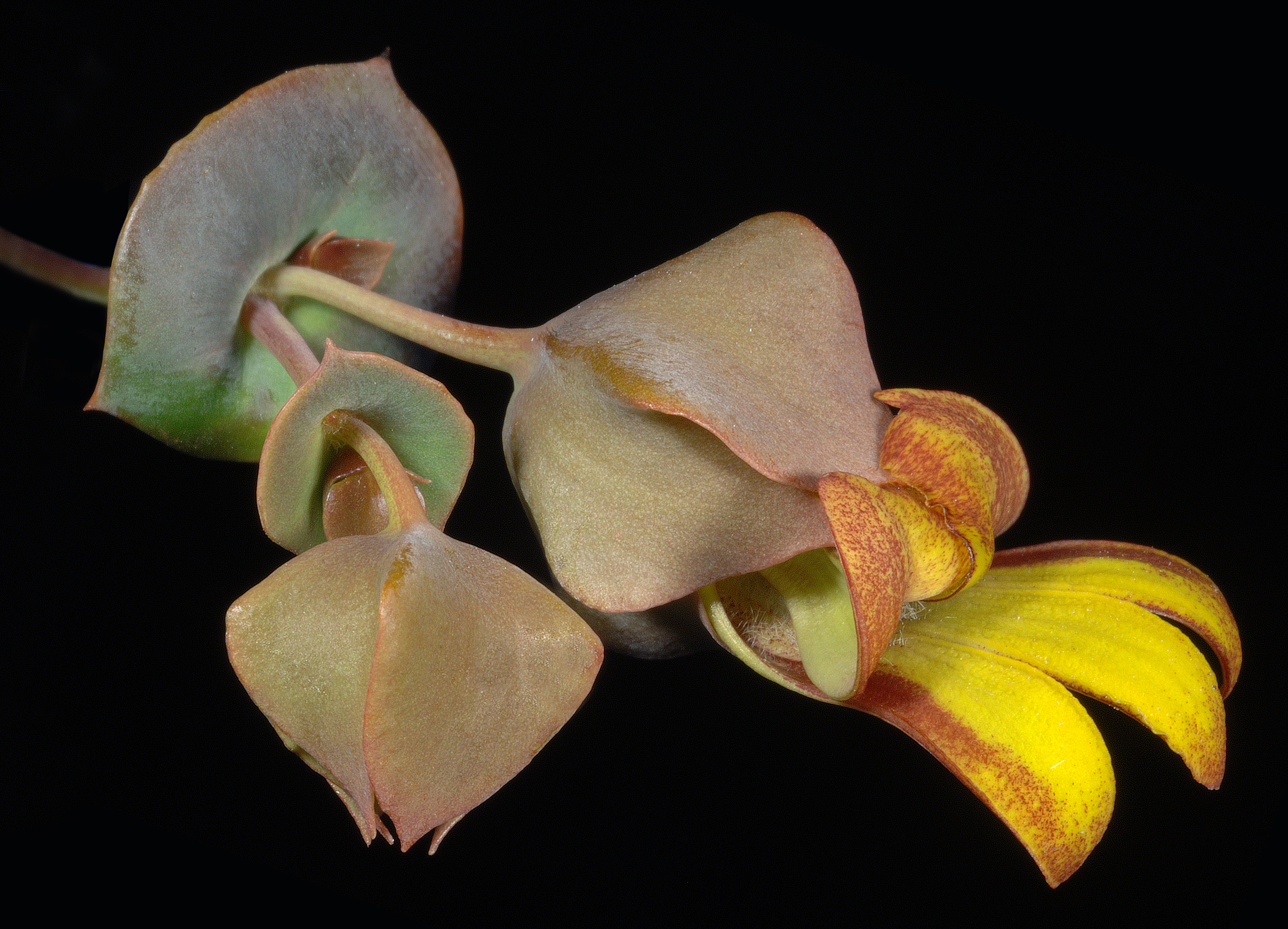
- Velleia connata

Scientific classification
- Kingdom: Plantae
- Clade: Embryophytes
- Clade: Tracheophytes
- Clade: Angiosperms
- Clade: Eudicots
- Clade: Asterids
- Order: Asterales
- Family: Goodeniaceae
- Genus: Goodenia
- Species: G. connata

Binomial name
- Goodenia connata (F.Muell.) K.A.Sheph.
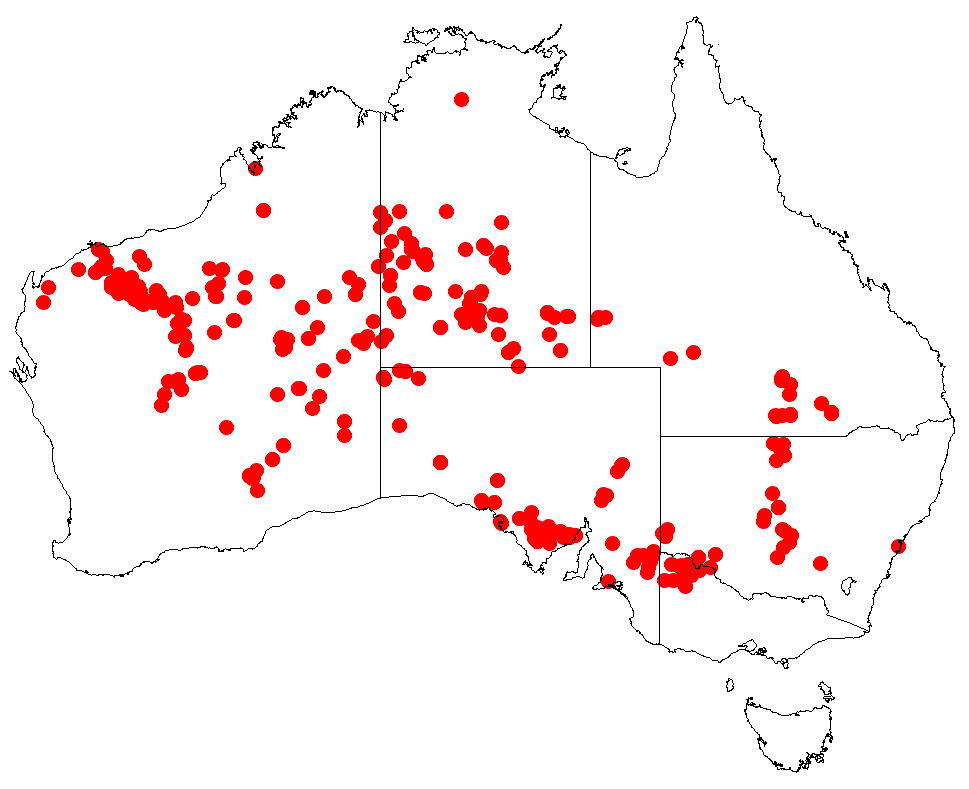
- Collections data for V. connata from the AVH

Synonyms
- Velleia connata F.Muell.; Velleia helmsii K.Krause

= Goodenia connata =

Species of plant

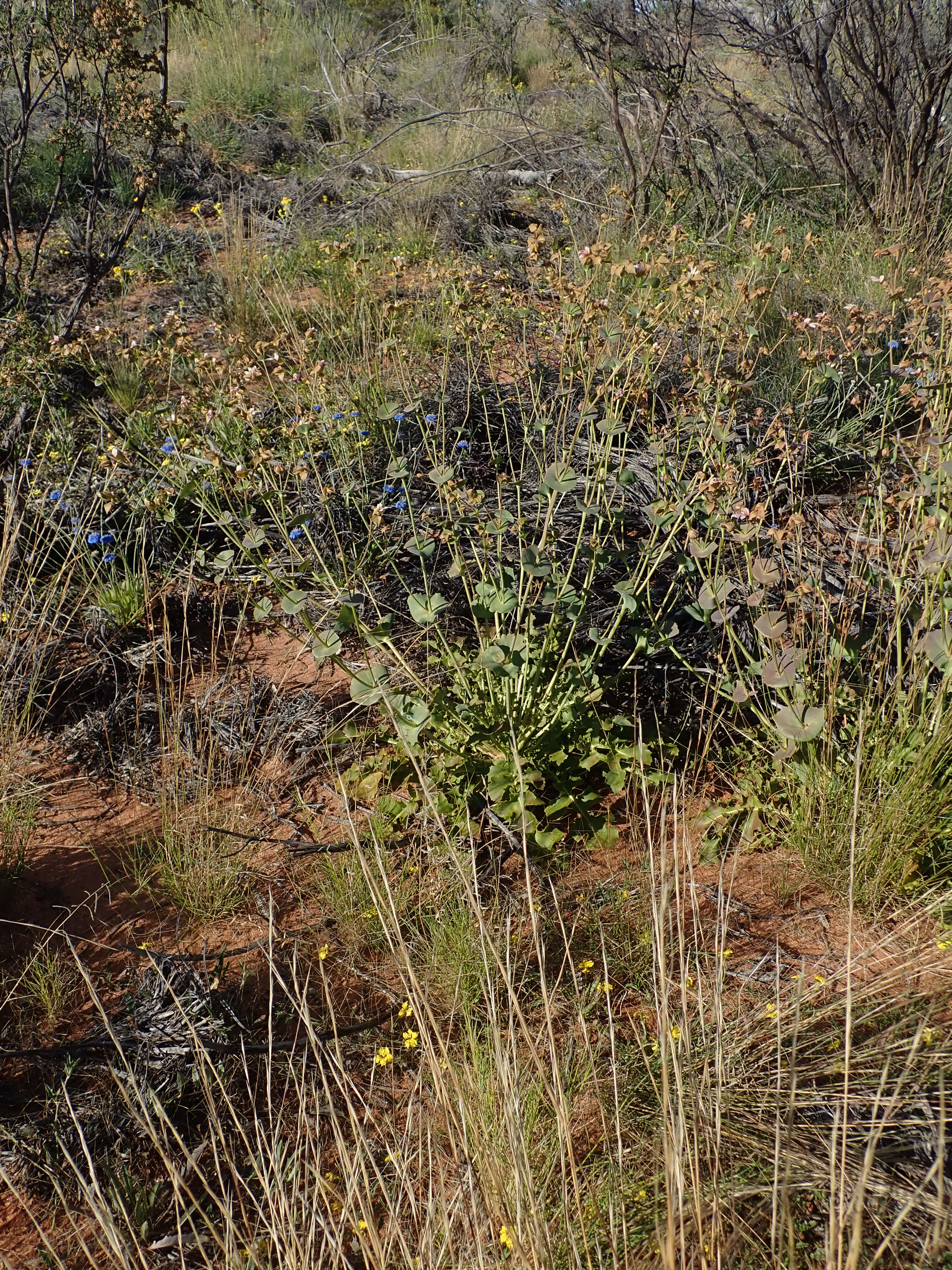
Habit

Goodenia connata, commonly known as cup velleia, is a species of flowering plant in the family Goodeniaceae, and is found in all mainland states and territories of Australia. It is a glabrous annual herb with a rosette of leaves at the base, and ascending flowering stems with yellow, brownish-yellow or white flowers, often with mauve markings.

== Description ==
Goodenia connata is a glabrous annual herb with finely toothed to lyre-shaped pinnatipartite leaves 50–200 mm (2.0–7.9 in) long and 14–80 mm (0.55–3.15 in) wide. The flowers are borne on a glabrous, erect flowering stem 150–600 mm (5.9–23.6 in) tall, the bracteoles joined to form a cup 20–60 mm (0.79–2.36 in) in diameter, each flower on a pedicel 20–70 mm (0.79–2.76 in) long. The flowers are yellow, brownish-yellow or white, often with mauve markings. The sepals are joined at the base forming a tube 2–3 mm (0.079–0.118 in) long, the lower lobes of the corolla are 9–11 mm (0.35–0.43 in) long with short, narrow wings. Flowering mainly occurs from September to January and the fruit is a compressed oval capsule 8 mm (0.31 in) long.

== Taxonomy ==
This species was first formally described in 1854 by Ferdinand von Mueller who gave it the name Velleia connata in Transactions of the Philosophical Society of Victoria, from specimens collected near the junction of the Murray and Murrumbidgee Rivers. In 2020, Kelly Anne Shepherd transferred the species to Goodenia as G. connata in the journal PhytoKeys.

== Distribution and habitat ==
Goodenia connata occurs in all continental Australian mainland states and territories. In New South Wales it is widespread in arid and semi-arid regions in the west of that state. In Victoria it is found in the far north-west on sand dunes. In South Australia in grows on sandy soils usually in mulga or triodia grassland and has a widespread but disjunct distribution. It grows on rocky ranges or hills in the southern half of the Northern Territory and in the Central Ranges, Coolgardie, Great Sandy Desert, Great Victoria Desert, Little Sandy Desert, Murchison and Pilbara bioregions of inland Western Australia.
