= Seal Island (Investigator Strait) =

Island in South Australia

- Location within South Australia

Geography
- Location: Investigator Strait
- Coordinates: 35°20′19″S 136°55′13″E
- Highest elevation: 35 m (115 ft)

Administration
- Australia

Seal Island is an island located in Investigator Strait off the south coast of Yorke Peninsula in the Australian state of South Australia about 7 kilometres (4.3 miles) south south-west of Stenhouse Bay. Since 1972, it has been part of the Althorpe Islands Conservation Park.

== Description ==
Seal Island is about 7 kilometres (4.3 miles) south south-west of Stenhouse Bay. It is described as an ‘elevated hump’ rising to a height of 35 metres (115 feet) with a series of ‘segmented islets’ at its west side. Seal Island is reported as being best accessed via its north coast and during the ‘calmest weather’. A number of sources consider Seal Island along with the Althorpe Islands and Haystack Island to be a group of islands known as the Althorpe Islands Group.

== Formation, geology and oceanography ==
Seal Island was formed between 7500 and 8900 years ago after sea levels rose at the start of the Holocene thereby separating Yorke Peninsula from Kangaroo Island. Seal Island is the remains of a granite inselberg capped by a layer of Bridgewater Formation calcarenite which has been extensively eroded by the action of the sea. Seal Island rises from a depth of 20 metres (66 feet) within 300 metres (980 feet) to its west and south shores, and within 700 metres (2,300 feet) of its east shore.

== Flora and fauna ==
=== Flora ===
A survey carried out in 1996 reported that 10 species of plants to be present including nitre-bush, grey samphire, roundleaved pigface, sea celery, marsh saltbush, ruby saltbush and Australian hollyhocks.

=== Fauna ===
A survey carried out in 1996 reported the following vertebrate animals to be present: black-faced cormorant, little penguin, sooty oystercatcher, rock parrot, silver gull and fairy tern. The 1996 survey also noted the presence of galahs and Australian sea lions but assumed these animals were not residents of the island. Subsequent surveys found that Australian sea lions do use the island as a haul-out area and possibly as a rookery, while the crested tern has been observed as being present on the island.

== Protected areas status ==
Since 1972, the island has been part of the Althorpe Islands Conservation Park. Since 2007, it has been a prohibited area where access is only allowed by permit in order to protect breeding population of seabirds. Since 2012, the waters surrounding its shores are part of a sanctuary zone located within the boundaries of the Southern Spencer Gulf Marine Park.
