= Dodonaea amplisemina =

Conservation status
- Priority Four — Rare Taxa (DEC)

Scientific classification
- Kingdom: Plantae
- Clade: Tracheophytes
- Clade: Angiosperms
- Clade: Eudicots
- Clade: Rosids
- Order: Sapindales
- Family: Sapindaceae
- Genus: Dodonaea
- Species: D. amplisemina

Binomial name
- Dodonaea amplisemina K.A.Sheph. & Rye

Species of shrub

Dodonaea amplisemina is a species of plant in the family Sapindaceae and is endemic to inland Western Australia. It is a dioecious shrub with many stems at the base, simple, sessile, narrowly linear leaves, flowers arranged singly, and spherical or oval capsules usually with three locules.

== Description ==
Dodonaea amplisemina is a dioecious shrub with many stems at the base, and that typically grows up to 0.3–1 m (1 ft 0 in – 3 ft 3 in) high and 1–2 m (3 ft 3 in – 6 ft 7 in) wide. The branchlets are woody with two kinds of leaves within a cluster, some narrowly linear, 3.3–30 mm (0.13–1.18 in) long and 0.6–1.4 mm (0.024–0.055 in) wide, and others narrowly egg-shaped or narrowly elliptic, 5.5–22 mm (0.22–0.87 in) long and 1.9–3.1 mm (0.075–0.122 in) wide. The flowers are arranged singly on peduncles 0.6–1.7 mm (0.024–0.067 in) long. The four to six sepals (of male flowers) are narrowly egg-shaped to egg-shaped, 1.8–2.7 mm (0.071–0.106 in) long and 1.5–2.0 mm (0.059–0.079 in) wide and there are 8 stamens equal to or longer than the sepals, the anthers 2.4–2.7 mm (0.094–0.106 in) long. Flowering has been recorded in August and the fruit is a capsule, 7–9.5 mm (0.28–0.37 in) long, 7–12 mm (0.28–0.47 in) wide, usually with three locules containing three to six shiny black spherical seeds.

== Taxonomy and naming ==
Dodonaea amplisemina was first formally described in 2007 by Kelly Anne Shepherd and Barbara Lynette Rye in the journal Nuytsia from specimens collected on Ninghan Station by Susan J. Patrick in 1993. The specific epithet (amplisemina) means 'large seeds'.

== Distribution and habitat ==
This species of Dodonaea grows in small, isolated populations on rocky hills in sandy clay from 140 km (87 mi) north-east of Meekatharra to 80 km (50 mi) south of Paynes Find in the Avon Wheatbelt, Gascoyne, Murchison and Yalgoo bioregions of inland Western Australia.

== Conservation status ==
Dodonaea amplisemina is listed as "Priority Four" by the Government of Western Australia Department of Biodiversity, Conservation and Attractions, meaning that it is rare or near threatened.
