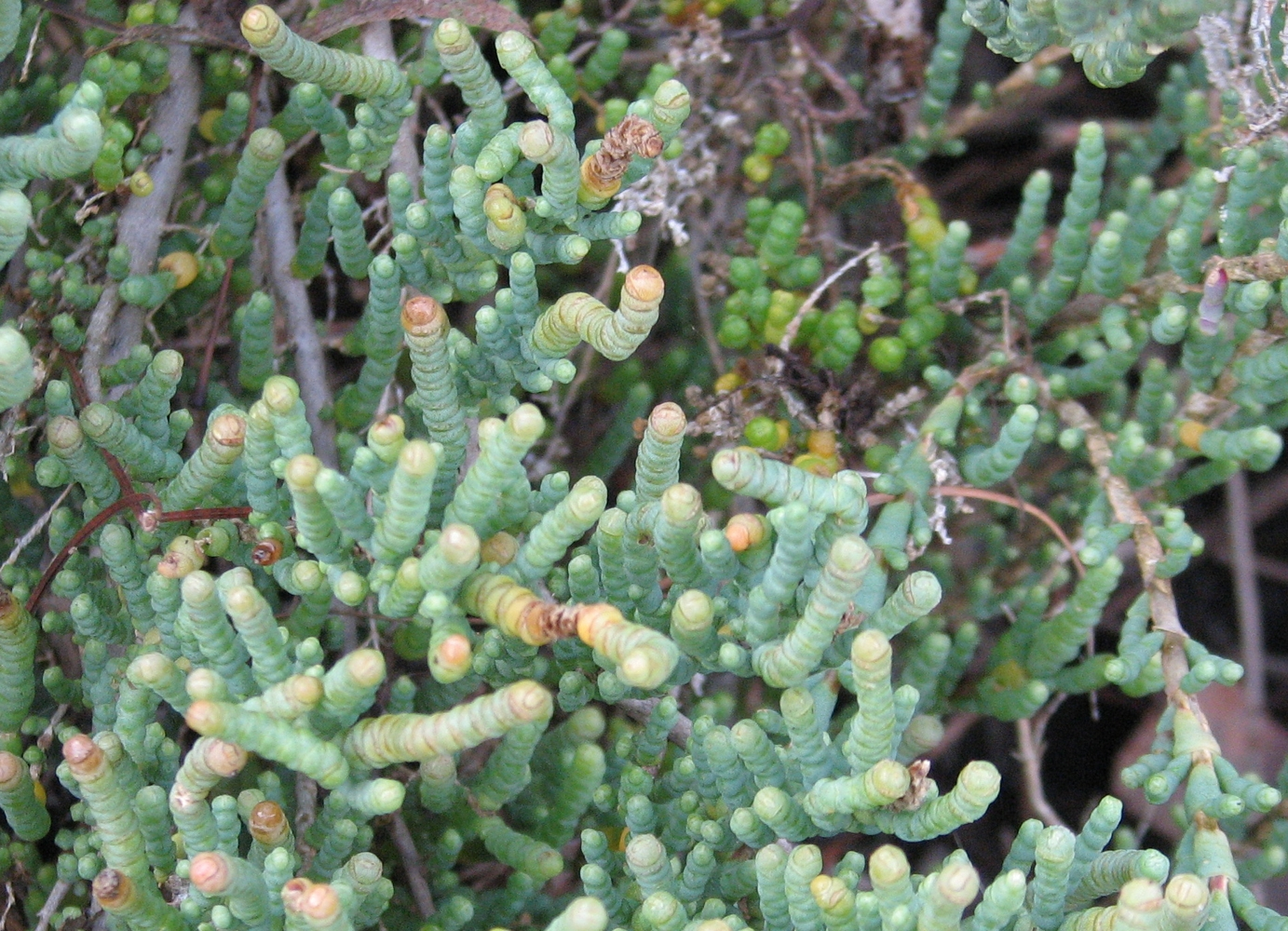
- Tecticornia pergranulata subsp. pergranulata

Scientific classification
- Kingdom: Plantae
- Clade: Tracheophytes
- Clade: Angiosperms
- Clade: Eudicots
- Order: Caryophyllales
- Family: Amaranthaceae
- Genus: Tecticornia
- Species: T. pergranulata

Binomial name
- Tecticornia pergranulata (J.M.Black) K.A.Sheph. & Paul G.Wilson

Subspecies
- Tecticornia pergranulata subsp. pergranulata (J.M.Black) Paul G.Wilson; Tecticornia pergranulata subsp. divaricata Paul G.Wilson; Tecticornia pergranulata subsp. elongata K.A.Sheph.& Paul G.Wilson

Synonyms
- Arthrocnemum halocnemoides var. pergranulatum (J.M.Black) Paul G.Wilson; Halosarcia pergranulata (R.Br.) Paul G.Wilson

= Tecticornia pergranulata =

Blackseed samphire

Species of plant

Tecticornia pergranulata (commonly known as the blackseed glasswort or blackseed samphire) is a succulent halophytic plant species in the family Chenopodiaceae, native to Australia. This plant is commonly tested in labs involving its C3 photosynthesis and its unique resistance to salinity and adversity.

== Background ==
Tecticornia pergranulata is a species of small erect sub-shrubs with articulate, succulent stems that grow around 1 meter in height. They also contain swollen branches with small leaf lobes and are mostly located on the boundaries of salt lakes and salty swamps all across southern Australia. They are most well known for their ability to adapt to high salinity levels and flooding.

== Adaptations ==
When dealing with floods, this species has a unique method it uses to survive. Through research done by Sarah M Rich, Martha Ludwig, and Timothy Colmer, it was discovered that photosynthesis that takes place within Tecticornia pergranulata roots allows this species to survive through intense flooding. Larger Tecticornia pergranulata plants grow an extensive system of adventitious roots from their woody basal stem regions. Smaller plants do not form aquatic roots, but do grow adventitious roots within the soil. The aquatic roots grown by the larger plants exhibit two distinctive growth forms differing in color and length.

== Types of roots ==
The most abundant roots that are grown are exclusively aquatic. These roots float in the water column and grow less than a millimeter in diameter. They are mostly superficially pink but can also contain a brownish green color especially found in the basal region. This type of root is also known as the aquatic root. The second type of root grown is superficially greenish brown and is thicker than aquatic roots. These roots range between 1 and 3 millimeters and grow through the water column into the surface soil. This type of root is also known as the semi-aquatic root.

== Survival ==
The photosynthetic process that occurs in this species roots has the potential to supply oxygen to the rest of the plant while facing a flooded habitat. The cortical cells of the aquatic and semi aquatic roots contain photosynthetic chloroplasts. These chloroplasts produce specific responses to variation in carbon dioxide and light availability under water. They also contain proteins involved in the photosynthetic production of oxygen and carbon fixation. Unlike the sedimentary roots in this species, the aquatic roots get access to oxygen from the water column and can produce it internally. When both the semi aquatic and aquatic roots are submerged in water, photosynthesis occurs supplying oxygen for the plant.

== Other classifications and uses ==
Tecticornia pergranulata is also part of a separate group called the Glassworts, the ashes of which yield soda ash, an important ingredient for glass and soap making.

== Subspecies ==
Tecticornia subspecies include:

- subspecies elongata
- subspecies divaricata
- subspecies pergranulata
