= Althorpe Island Airstrip =

Former airstrip on Althorpe Island

- IATA: none; ICAO: YALT

Summary
- Airport type: Defunct
- Location: Althorpe Islands, South Australia
- Opened: 1961
- Closed: 2009
- Time zone: ACST (+9:30)
  - Summer (DST): ACDT (+10:30)
- Coordinates: 35°22′14″S 136°51′40″E

Maps
- Location in South Australia
- Interactive map of Althorpe Island Airstrip

Runways
Direction	Length		Surface
Direction	ft	m	Surface
01/19	1,476	450	Grass

Althorpe Island Airstrip (ICAO: YALT) was an airport that serviced the lighthouse on Althorpe Island in the Investigator Strait, South Australia. It was established in 1961 with Commodore Aviation flying in supplies to the island, and was closed in 2009 following disuse.

== History ==
Before the construction of Althorpe Island Airstrip, the only way to the island was from the jetty by sea by either using the flying fox or climbing the cliff.

In 1961, Althorpe Island Airstrip was established, and a 450 meter long runway was cleared on the plateau of the island. The runway was sown with mixed grass seed for surface stabilization. This introduced a new grassland community, including species like the Bearded Oat (Avena barbata), Great Brome (Bromus diandrus), and Periennial Ryegrass (Lolium perenne) that dominate the airstrip and surrounding infrastructure.

In 1963, Commodore Aviation Pty Ltd was contracted to fly stores and personnel to Althorpe Island Airstrip. It was equipped with a 450 meter long undulating airstrip, with high cliffs at both ends. Due to runway conditions, manager of Commodore Aviation, Ron Fuller and chief pilot, Colin Spratt were the only pilots authorized to land on the airstrip. Mr Fuller described taking-off from the airstrip as being similar to "launching from an aircraft carrier deck". Every year, on 21 September, mutton birds return to the island and excavate nesting burrows across the strip. This required lighthouse keepers to fill out the holes with shovels before each supply flight, however, the birds would dig out new holes by next morning. Only Czechoslovak-built Aero Ae-45 aircraft took off from the airstrip. Throughout operation, Althorpe Island Airstrip was mainly used to fly in light supplies like groceries and mail via light aircraft.

By the 1980s, Bruce Bretherton and Kerry Pearce of Commodore Aviation were the only two pilots authorized to land on the airstrip. The Port Lincoln Times described Althorpe Island Airstrip as being one of the most hazardous airstrips in the country. In 1983, Commodore Aviation renewed its agreement with the Department of Transport and Construction to continue servicing the airstrip.

=== Closure ===
In 1991, the lighthouse became unmanned, diminishing the need for an airstrip. In 2001, mowing of the airstrip ceased, allowing native plants species to regrow, mainly Marsh and Saltbush. By 2009, Althorpe Island Airstrip was formally closed following years of disuse. As native plant growth have increased over the former airstrip, there are no plans to reopen the airstrip.
