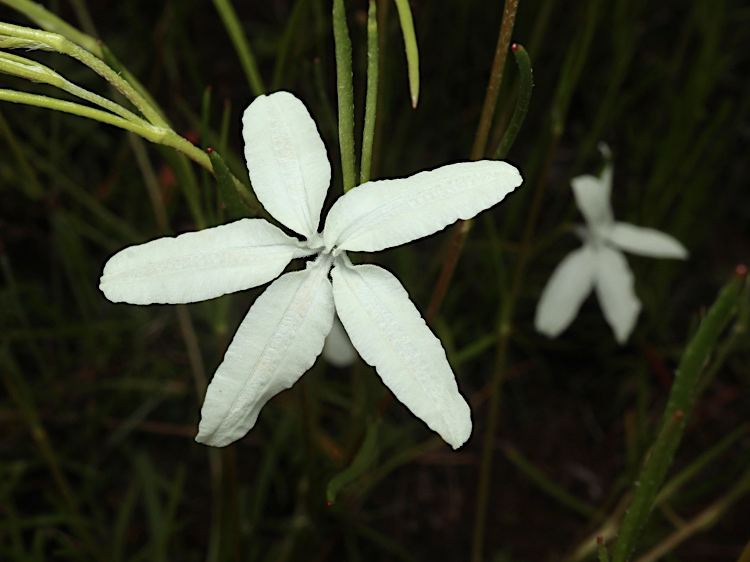
- In Walpole-Nornalup National Park

Scientific classification
- Kingdom: Plantae
- Clade: Embryophytes
- Clade: Tracheophytes
- Clade: Spermatophytes
- Clade: Angiosperms
- Clade: Eudicots
- Clade: Asterids
- Order: Asterales
- Family: Goodeniaceae
- Genus: Scaevola
- Species: S. filifolia

Binomial name
- Scaevola filifolia (R.Br.) K.A.Sheph.

= Scaevola filifolia =

Species of flowering plant

Scaevola filifolia, also known as thread-leaved Diaspasis, is a species of flowering plant in the family Goodeniaceae and is endemic to the south of Western Australia. It is a low shrub with fine, fleshy leaves and white or pink flowers

== Description ==
Scaevola filifolia is an erect or ascending perennial shrub that typically grows to a height of 50–80 cm (20–31 in) and 30–60 cm (12–24 in) wide. The leaves are linear, thick, sometimes toothed, up to 40 cm (16 in) long and 0.5–2 mm (0.020–0.079 in) wide, light green and fleshy. Abundant white or pink flowers are borne from October to February on a peduncle 10–30 mm (0.39–1.18 in) long, with leaf-like bracts and linear bracteoles 10–20 mm (0.39–0.79 in) long. The sepals are triangular, 1–2 mm (0.039–0.079 in) long, the petals 9–16 mm (0.35–0.63 in) long with lobes up to 14 mm (0.55 in) long and rounded wings up to 3 mm (0.12 in) long. The fruit is elliptic, 3–4 mm (0.12–0.16 in) long.

== Taxonomy and naming ==
This species was first formally described in 1810 by Robert Brown who gave it the name Diaspasis filifolia in his Prodromus Florae Novae Hollandiae. In 2020, Kelly Anne Shepherd transferred the species to Scaevola as S. filifolia, and the change is accpted by the Australian Plant Census. The specific epithet (filifolia) means 'thread-leaved'.

== Distribution and habitat ==
This species of Scaevola grows in bogs and winter-wet areas in the Jarrah Forest, Swan Coastal Plain and Warren bioregions of southern Western Australia.

== Conservation status ==
Scaevola filifolia is listed as 'not threatened by the Western Australian Government Department of Biodiversity, Conservation and Attractions.
