= Goodenia corralina =

Conservation status
- Priority Two — Poorly Known Taxa (DEC)

Scientific classification
- Kingdom: Plantae
- Clade: Tracheophytes
- Clade: Angiosperms
- Clade: Eudicots
- Clade: Asterids
- Order: Asterales
- Family: Goodeniaceae
- Genus: Goodenia
- Species: G. corralina

Binomial name
- Goodenia corralina L.W.Sage & K.A.Sheph.

Species of plant

Goodenia corralina is a species of flowering plant in the family Goodeniaceae and endemic to a restricted area near Norseman in Western Australia. It is a low, spreading, perennial, herb with linear to lance-shaped leaves in a rosette at the base of the plant, and racemes of yellow flowers.

== Description ==
Goodenia corralina is a low, spreading perennial herb that typically grows to a height of 10–70 cm (3.9–27.6 in) and is more or less glabrous. The leaves are arranged in a rosette at the base of the plant and are linear to lance-shaped with the narrower end towards the base, 34–120 mm (1.3–4.7 in) long and 1–11 mm (0.039–0.433 in) wide, sometime toothed or lyre-shaped. The flowers are arranged in a raceme 40–700 mm (1.6–27.6 in) long on a peduncle 40–114 mm (1.6–4.5 in) long, each flower on a pedicel 9–11 mm (0.35–0.43 in) long with linear, leaf like bracts at the base. The sepals are linear, 5–6.5 mm (0.20–0.26 in) long and the corolla is yellow and up to 14 mm (0.55 in) long. The lower lobes of the corolla are about 6 mm (0.24 in) long with wings 1–1.5 mm (0.039–0.059 in) wide. Flowering has been recorded in May and the fruit is an elliptic capsule 6–7 mm (0.24–0.28 in) long.

== Taxonomy and naming ==
Goodenia corralina was first formally described in 2007 by Leigh William Sage and Kelly Anne Shepherd in the journal Nuytsia from material collected near Norseman by Michael Hislop and Fred Hort in 2004. The specific epithet (corralina) is an anagram of R. Carolin, in honour of Roger Charles Carolin.

== Distribution and habitat ==
This goodenia is only known from the type location near Norseman, where it grows in open woodland near a large granite outcrop.

== Conservation status ==
Goddenia corralina is classified as "Priority Two" by the Western Australian Government Department of Parks and Wildlife meaning that it is poorly known and from only one or a few locations.
