= Western River, South Australia =

Western River
- Town
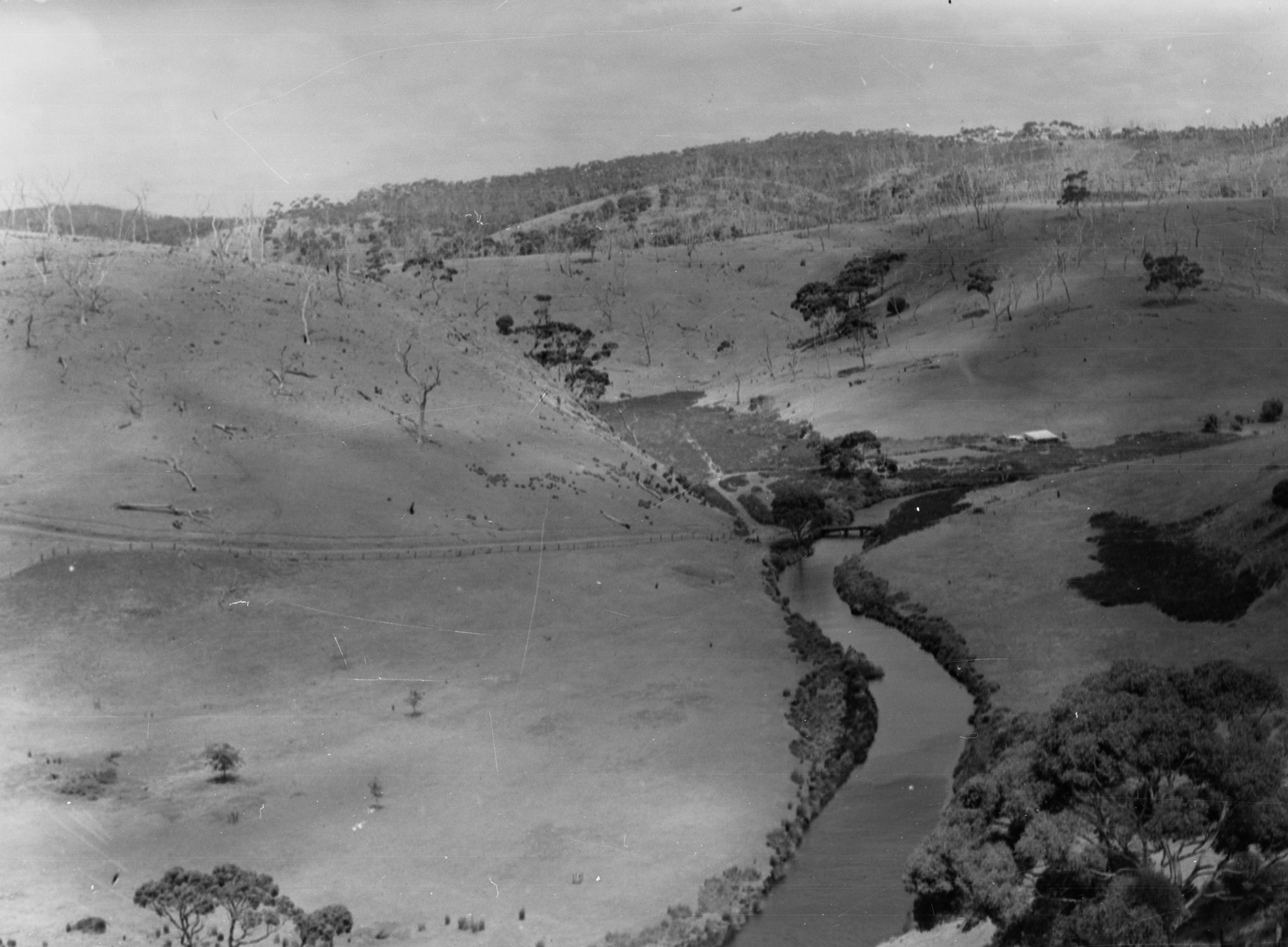
- Western River on Kangaroo Island, ca. 1938

- Coordinates: 35.718°S 136.933°E
- Country: Australia
- State: South Australia
- Region: Fleurieu and Kangaroo Island
- LGA: Kangaroo Island Council
- Location: 170 km (110 mi) south-west of Adelaide; 64 km (40 mi) west of Kingscote
- Established: 2002

Government
  - State electorate: Mawson
  - Federal division: Mayo

Population
  - Total: 16 (SAL 2021)
- Time zone: UTC+9:30 (ACST)
  - Summer (DST): UTC+10:30 (ACST)
- Postcode: 5223
- County: County of Carnarvon
- Mean max temp: 22.1 °C (71.8 °F)
- Mean min temp: 11.5 °C (52.7 °F)
- Annual rainfall: 534.0 mm (21.02 in)
Localities around Western River
Investigator Strait	Investigator Strait	Investigator Strait
De Mole River	Western River	Middle River
Gosse	Gosse	Duncan
- Coordinates; Locations; Climate; Adjoining localities

Western River is a locality in the Australian state of South Australia located on the north coast of Kangaroo Island overlooking Investigator Strait about 170 kilometres (110 miles) south-west of the state capital of Adelaide and about 64 kilometres (40 miles) west of the municipal seat of Kingscote.

Its boundaries were created in March 2002 for the “long established name” which was derived from the river located within its boundaries. In 2011, a portion of the adjoining locality of Middle River was excised and added to Western River. A school operated within what is now the locality here between 1901 and 1903.

Western River occupies land bounded by Investigator Strait to the north. Land use is divided between conservation and agriculture with the former applying to the coastline in order to “enhance and conserve the natural features of the coast” and to the protected area known as the Western River Wilderness Protection Area while the latter applies to land in the locality's southern half.

Western River is located within the federal division of Mayo, the state electoral district of Mawson and the local government area of the Kangaroo Island Council.
