= Stokes Bay (South Australia) =

Bay in South Australia

- Location in South Australia
- Location: Investigator Strait, South Australia
- Coordinates: 35°37′16.05″S 137°12′02.40″E
- Type: Bay
- Etymology: "Mr Stokes"
- Part of: Investigator Strait
- Basin countries: Australia
- Max. length: about 300 metres (980 ft) (west-east)
- Max. width: about 100 metres (330 ft) (north-south)
- Settlements: Stokes Bay

Stokes Bay is a bay in South Australia on the northern coast of Kangaroo Island located about 38 kilometres (24 mi) west of the town of Kingscote. It is described as being the largest of a number of coves located along the coast between Cape Dutton about 3 nautical miles (5.6 km) to the west and Cape Cassini about 7 nautical miles (13 km) to the east. The source of the bay's name is reported as taking its names from "supposedly takes its name from the first mate of the Hartley which arrived in South Australia in October 1837" and is not to be confused with a Henry Stokes (c.1808-1898), a sealer who lived on Kangaroo Island prior to 1836 or a John Stokes who arrived on the island in 1817 and who is reported as residing at Stokes Bay.
