= Middle River, South Australia =

Middle River
- Town
- Coordinates: 35.666960°S 137.079150°E
- Country: Australia
- State: South Australia
- Region: Fleurieu and Kangaroo Island
- LGA: Kangaroo Island Council
- Location: 162 km (101 mi) south-west of Adelaide city centre
- Established: 2002

Government
  - State electorate: Mawson
  - Federal division: Mayo

Population
  - Total: 23 (SAL 2021)
- Time zone: UTC+9:30 (ACST)
  - Summer (DST): UTC+10:30 (ACST)
- Postcode: 5223
- County: Carnarvon
- Mean max temp: 198.1 °C (388.6 °F)
- Mean min temp: 11.6 °C (52.9 °F)
- Annual rainfall: 488.9 mm (19.25 in)
Localities around Middle River
Investigator Strait	Investigator Strait	Stokes Bay
Western River	Middle River	Stokes Bay
Western River	Duncan	Duncan
- Coordinates; Locations; Climate; Adjoining localities

Middle River is a locality in the Australian state of South Australia located on the north coast of Kangaroo Island overlooking Investigator Strait about 162 kilometres (101 miles) south-west of the state capital of Adelaide.

Its boundaries were created in March 2002 for the “long established name” and include the following shack sites - Middle River Shack Site and King George Shack Site. In 2011, a portion of Middle River was excised and added to the adjoining locality of Western River.

The locality includes the watercourse called the Middle River and the associated water storage facility, the Middle River Reservoir.

Land use in the locality is principally for agricultural purposes with activity limited on both the coastline to the north and on land at the locality's southern boundary respectively for conservation purposes and for the protection of the drainage basin supplying the Middle River Reservoir.

Middle River is located within the federal division of Mayo, the state electoral district of Mawson and the local government area of the Kangaroo Island Council.
