= Althorpe Islands Conservation Park =

Protected area in South Australia

- IUCN category Ia (strict nature reserve)
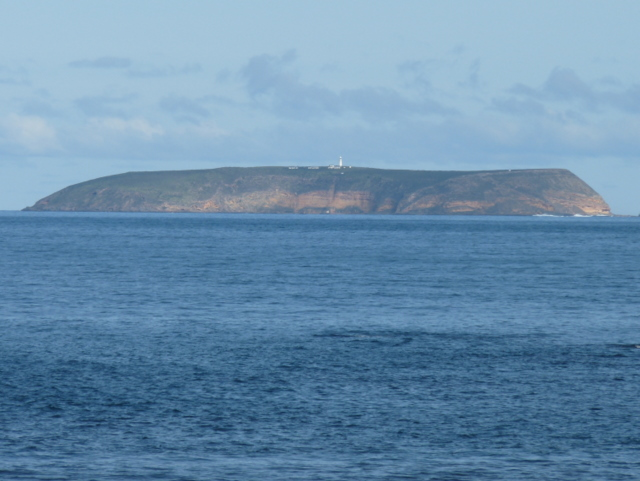
- Althorpe Islands

- Location within South Australia
- Location: South Australia
- Nearest city: Stenhouse Bay
- Coordinates: 35°21′57.4632″S 136°51′58.7412″E
- Area: 1.63 km^{2} (0.63 sq mi)
- Established: 16 March 1967; 59 years ago
- Governing body: Department for Environment and Water

Althorpe Islands Conservation Park is a protected area in the Australian state of South Australia occupying the Althorpe Island, Haystack Island and Seal Island in Investigator Strait near the town of Stenhouse Bay.

The conservation park consists of the following land collectively known as the Althorpe Islands - Althorpe, Haystack and Seal Islands. Haystack and Seal Islands first acquired protected area status as a fauna conservation reserve declared on 16 March 1967 under the Crown Lands Act, 1929–1966. On 27 April 1972, the fauna conservation reserve was reconstituted as the Althorpe Islands Conservation Park under the National Parks and Wildlife Act 1972. On 14 August 1997, Althorpe Island was added to the conservation park.

The purpose of the conservation park is "to protect important wildlife habitat, particularly for sea-bird populations".

It is classified as an IUCN Category Ia protected area. In 1980, it was listed on the now-defunct Register of the National Estate.
