= Middle River Dam =

Dam and reservoir in South Australia

- Location of the dam in South Australia
- Location: Kangaroo Island, South Australia
- Coordinates: 35°43′08″S 137°05′46″E
- Purpose: Water supply
- Status: Operational
- Opening date: 1968
- Owner: Government of South Australia
- Operator: SA Water

Dam and spillways
- Type of dam: Gravity dam
- Impounds: Middle River
- Height (foundation): 20 m (66 ft)
- Length: 152 m (499 ft)
- Dam volume: 7×10^{3} m^{3} (250×10^{3} cu ft)
- Spillway type: Uncontrolled
- Spillway capacity: 245 m^{3}/s (8,700 cu ft/s)

Reservoir
- Creates: Middle River Reservoir
- Total capacity: 540 ML (440 acre⋅ft)
- Active capacity: 470 ML (380 acre⋅ft)
- Catchment area: 101 km^{2} (39 sq mi)
- Surface area: 12.7 ha (31 acres)

The Middle River Dam is a gravity dam across the Middle River, located on the north of Kangaroo Island in South Australia. Completed in 1968, its resultant reservoir, the Middle River Reservoir, provides potable water for the island community.

== Overview ==
Construction of Middle River Dam was started in response to a doubling of the population on Kangaroo Island following World War II. The reservoir supplies water to Kingscote, Brownlow KI and Parndana.

The concrete dam wall is 20 metres (66 ft) high and 152 metres (499 ft) long. When full, the reservoir has capacity of 470 megalitres (380 acre⋅ft) and covers 12.7 hectares (31 acres), drawn from a catchment area of approximately 101 square kilometres (39 sq mi).

== See also ==
- List of reservoirs and dams in South Australia
