= Stokes Bay, South Australia =

Stokes Bay
- Town
- Interactive map of Stokes Bay
- Coordinates: 35.660980°S 137.176660°E
- Country: Australia
- State: South Australia
- Region: Fleurieu and Kangaroo Island
- LGA: Kangaroo Island Council
- Location: 149 km (93 mi) south-west of Adelaide; 37 km (23 mi) west of Kingscote
- Established: 2002

Government
  - State electorate: Mawson
  - Federal division: Mayo

Population
  - Total: 52 (SAL 2021)
- Time zone: UTC+9:30 (ACST)
  - Summer (DST): UTC+10:30 (ACST)
- Postcode: 5223
- County: County of Carnarvon
- Mean max temp: 19.1 °C (66.4 °F)
- Mean min temp: 11.6 °C (52.9 °F)
- Annual rainfall: 488.9 mm (19.25 in)
Localities around Stokes Bay
| Investigator Strait | Investigator Strait | Investigator Strait |
| Middle River | Stokes Bay | Cassini |
| Middle River | Duncan | Cassini |
- Coordinates; Locations; Climate

Stokes Bay is a locality in the Australian state of South Australia located on the north coast of Kangaroo Island overlooking Investigator Strait about 162 kilometres (101 miles) south-west of the state capital of Adelaide. Its boundaries were created in March 2002 for the “long established name” and includes the Stokes Bay Shack Site. Land use in the locality is principally for agricultural purposes with activity limited on the coastline to the north for conservation purposes. A settlement also occupies land immediately adjoining the bay of the same name. Stokes Bay is located within the federal division of Mayo, the state electoral district of Mawson and the local government area of the Kangaroo Island Council.
