= Tecticornia lylei =

Scientific classification
- Kingdom: Plantae
- Clade: Tracheophytes
- Clade: Angiosperms
- Clade: Eudicots
- Order: Caryophyllales
- Family: Amaranthaceae
- Genus: Tecticornia
- Species: T. lylei

Binomial name
- Tecticornia lylei (Ewart & Jean White) K.A.Sheph. & Paul G.Wilson

Native Australian plant

Tecticornia lylei, commonly known as wiry glasswort, is a small shrub with in the family Chenopodiaceae. It occurs in saline clay soils on the beds of and around the perimeter of salt lakes. The erect shrub can grow up to 1 m in height and 1.5 m wide, and has slender branches with very slender branchlets, its articles cylindrical, dull mid-green and about 3 mm long and 2 mm wide. The wiry glasswort flowers between November and June, with tiny flowers less than 3 mm across which fruit when pollinated. Listed as endangered in New South Wales and rare in Victoria and South Australia, T. lylei is threatened by trampling and overgrazing, vegetation clearing and stochastic events.

== Distribution and habitat ==
Tecticornia lylei is an endangered species in NSW and rare in Victoria, with the numbers especially low in the once plentiful low open-shrubland in the Murray Darling Depression Bioregion. Requiring particularly saline soils to survive, it occurs on saline clay soils on the beds of small salt lakes and around the perimeter of larger salt lakes. T. lylei may also be found in somewhat saline and seasonally waterlogged localities.

== Ecology ==
Tecticornia lylei provides an important habitat for fauna in saline ecosystems. T. lylei pumps oxygen into the sediment under waterlogged conditions, improving the health of saline aquatic and riparian ecological systems. This provides habitat for fauna in saline ecosystems. Insect activity is also high around T. lylei, suggesting benefit for insect communities in saline environments. T. lylei is highly adapted to saline environments.

== Life history traits ==
The erect shrub can grow up to 1 m in height and 1.5 m wide and has slender branches with very slender branchlets; its articles are cylindrical, dull mid-green, and about 3 mm long and 2 mm wide. Tecticornia lylei is leafless with slender branches terminating in spikes; flowers are exposed vertically to the spike and less than 3 mm across, which, when pollinated, form fruitlets protruding from the bracts; the perianth is firm and pithy. Fruiting spikes shed fruitlets, encasing the seed. Seeds are broadly elliptic and measure 1–1.5 mm long; testes are crustaceous, reddish-brown, and concentrically granular over the embryo.

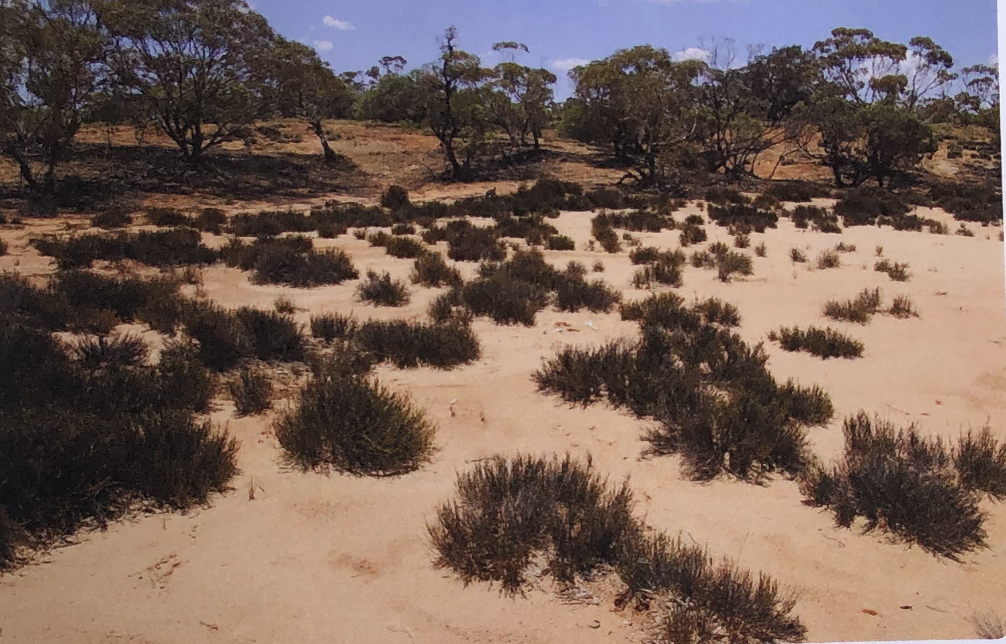
Tecticornia Lylei at Nanya Station in western New South Wales

== Cultivation and propagation ==
Tecticornia lylei can be grown from tube stock, by cutting, or by direct seeding. Fruiting segments should be collected from the middle of January to late February. Shoots or whole plants should be harvested by hand or with a forage harvester and spread on the new site. This process is most effective when the new site is in lightly cultivated, salt-affected areas to enable plants to germinate and spread naturally.

== Conservation status ==
Tecticornia lylei is listed as an endangered species in NSW and rare in Victoria and South Australia. T. lylei's primary threat is from introduced hoofed livestock species such as cattle and sheep, which overgraze and trample the native vegetation. T. lylei is threatened by vegetation clearing to access salt deposits, mineral exploration, and sand mining. Stochastic events such as flooding and drought may bring localised extinction, while limited genetic diversity hinders the species ability to adapt to potential environmental changes.
