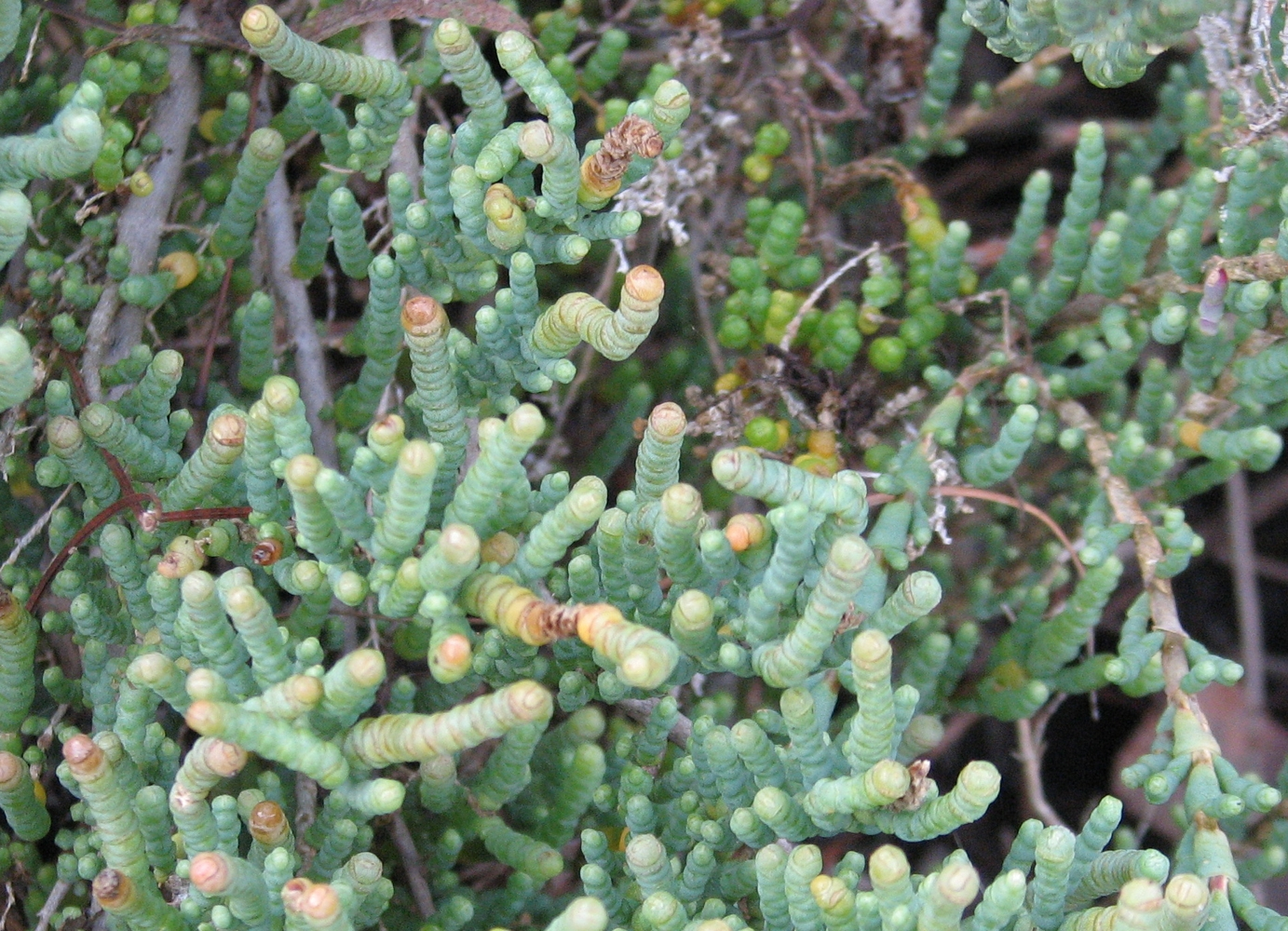
- Samphire, Tecticornia pergranulata

Scientific classification
- Kingdom: Plantae
- Clade: Tracheophytes
- Clade: Angiosperms
- Clade: Eudicots
- Order: Caryophyllales
- Family: Amaranthaceae
- Subfamily: Salicornioideae
- Genus: Tecticornia; Hook. f.

Species
- ca. 44 species, see text

= Tecticornia =

Genus of plants

Tecticornia is a genus of succulent, salt tolerant plants largely endemic to Australia. Taxa in the genus are commonly referred to as samphires. In 2007, the genus Halosarcia, along with three other Australian genera (Pachycornia, Sclerostegia and Tegicornia) was incorporated into the genus.

== Description ==
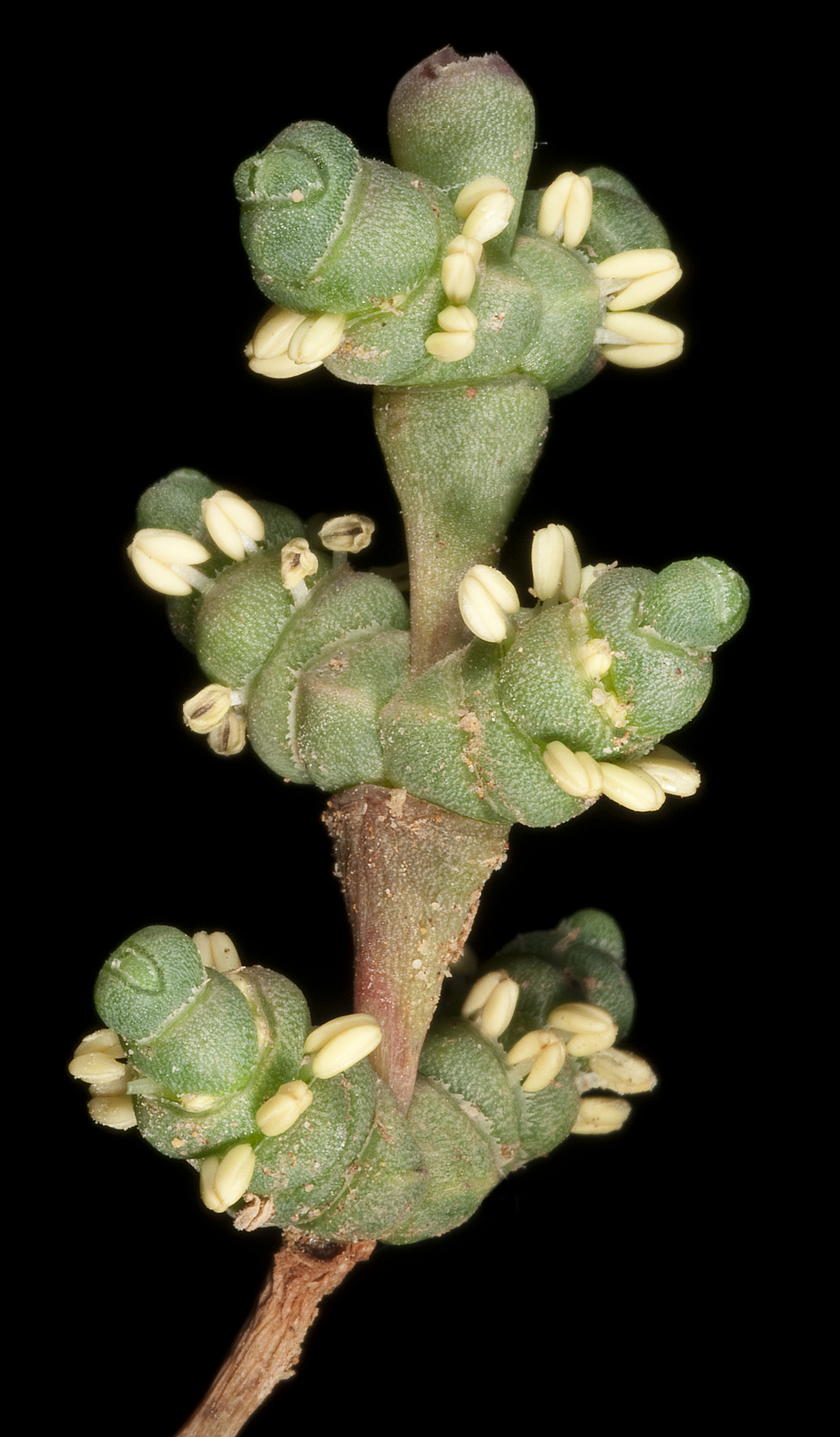
Tecticornia flowers

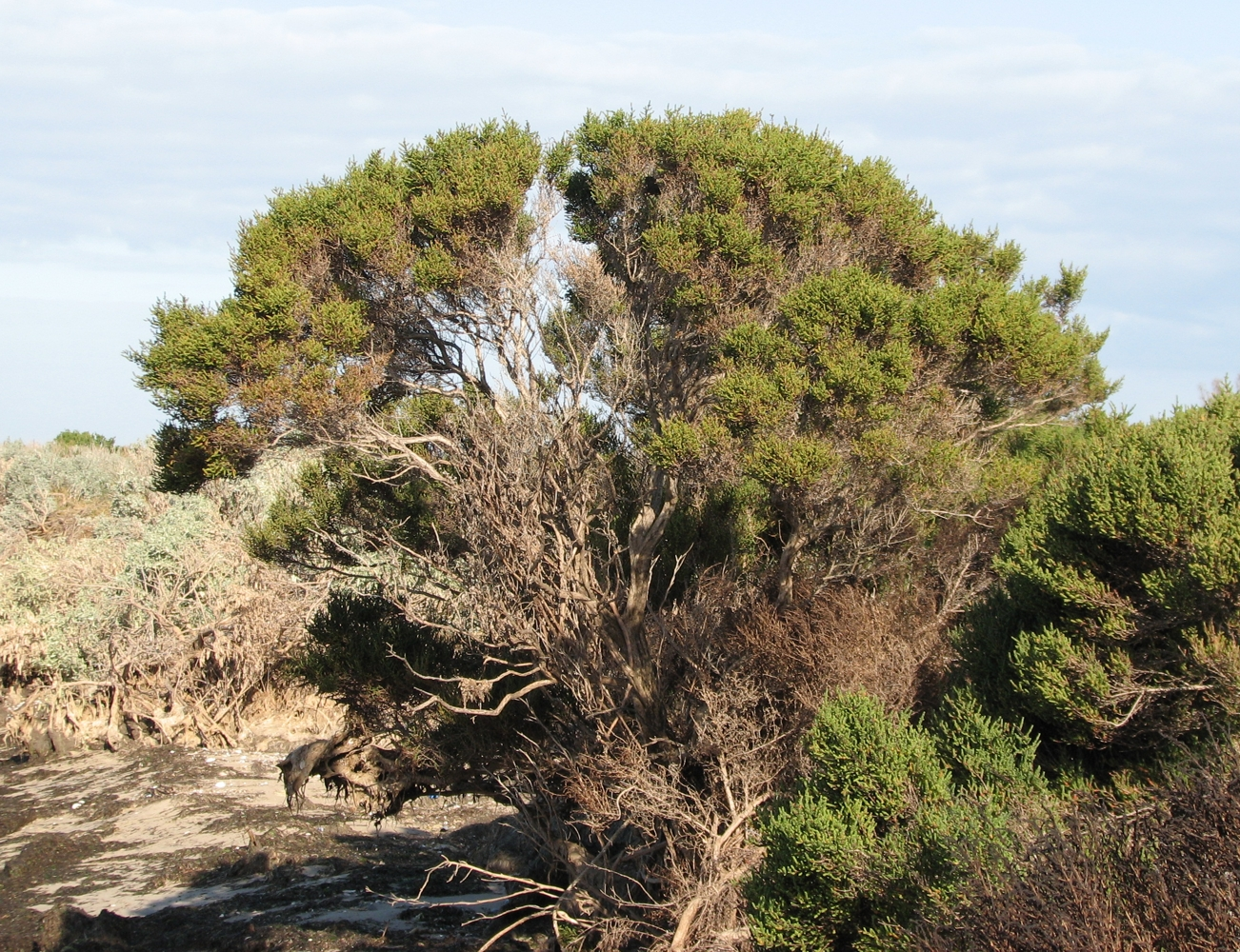
Tecticornia arbuscula

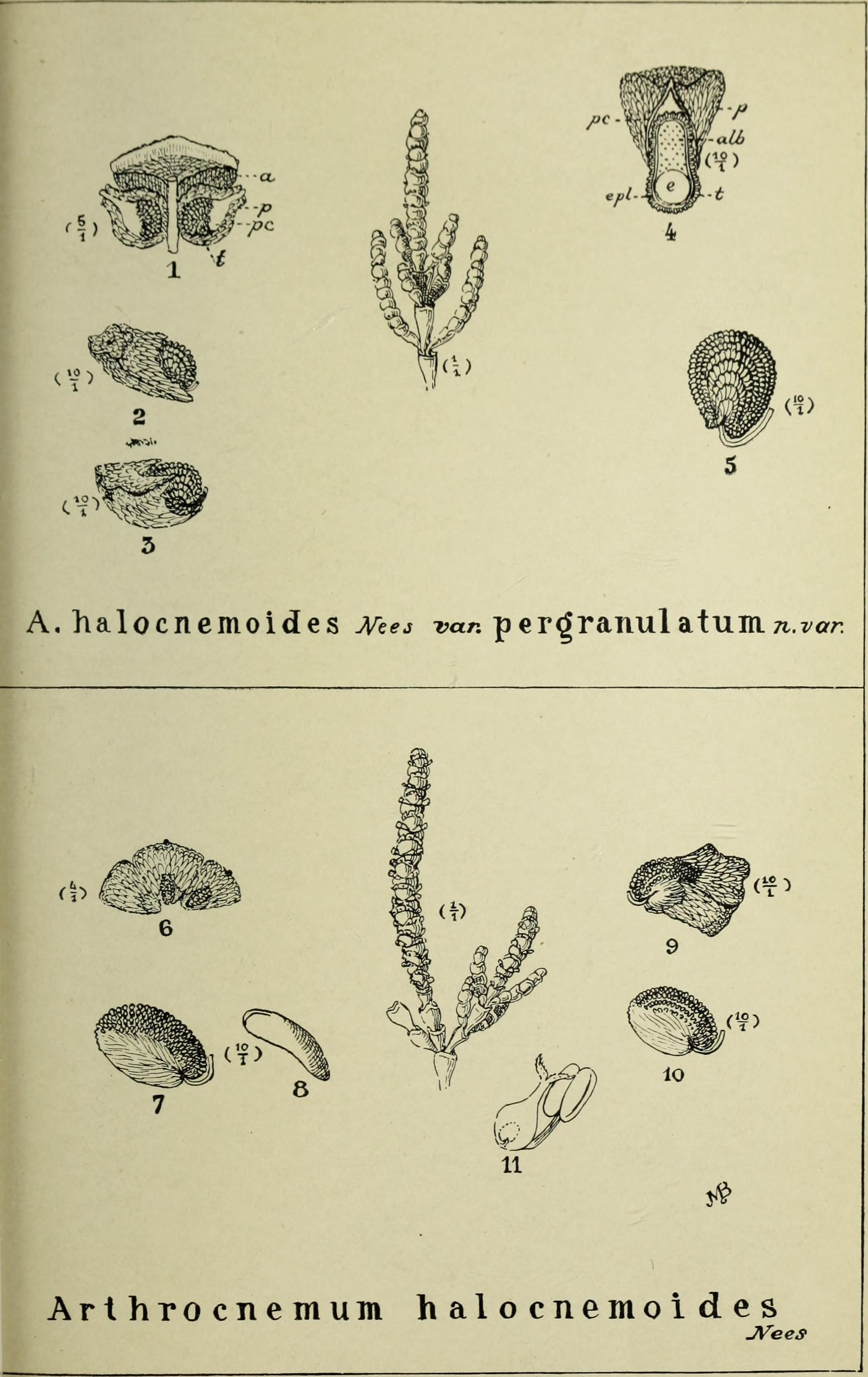
Illustrations of Tecticornia pergranulata (up) and Tecticornia halocnemoides (down)

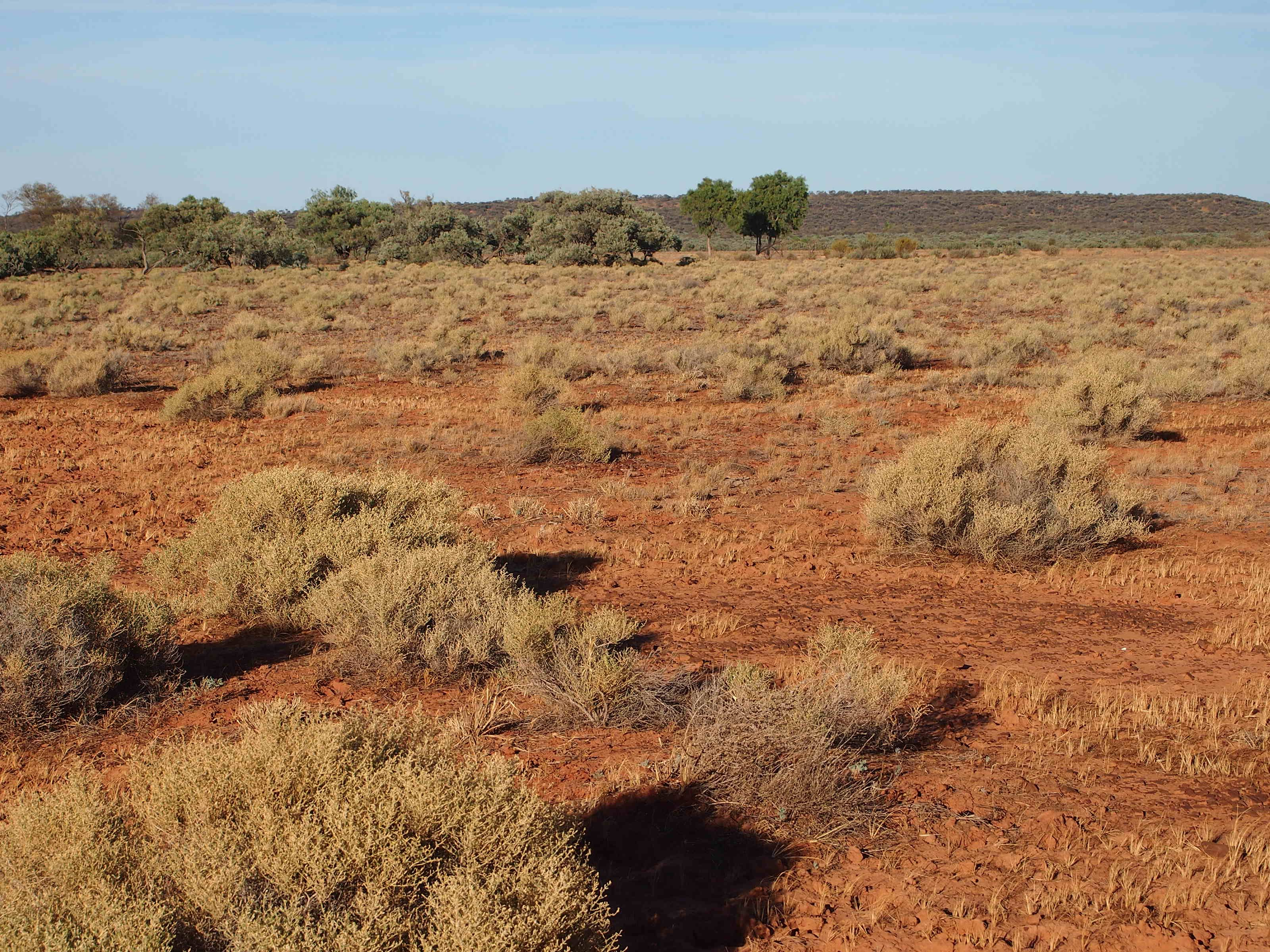
Tecticornia tenuis habitat

The species of Tecticornia grow as annual or perennial herbs, subshrubs or small shrubs. Stems are branched, glabrous and appear jointed. The opposite leaves are fleshy, glabrous, connate in the lower part and cup-like or collar-like stem-clasping, with minute (0–3 mm long) two-lobed to triangular leaf blades.

The spike-shaped inflorescences consist of opposite bracts, mostly connate and stem-clasping, free in some species. Their blades are cup- or collar-like or deltoid to semi-circular scales. In the axil of each bract, there are three to five (rarely one or seven) flowers, free or sometimes fused to each other, to the bract, and to the inflorescence axis. The flowers are hermaphrodite, rarely unisexual. They consist of a 2-3-lobed perianth of connate tepals, one stamen, and an ovary with two stigmas.

In fruit, the perianth remains membranous or becomes crustaceous, spongy, or horny. The fruit wall (pericarp) may be membranous, fleshy, crustaceous, or woody. The seed is disc-shaped or wedge-shaped, its seed coat with smooth or reticulate, tuberculate or longitudinally ribbed surface. The seed contains the curved embryo and copious perisperm (feeding tissue).

== Distribution ==
All species of Tecticornia are distributed in Australia. Only one species, Tecticornia indica (Syn. Halosarcia indica, Arthrocnenum indicum) has a wider range outside this continent along the tropical coasts of the Indian Ocean to eastern and western tropical Africa.

== Systematics ==
The first publication of Tecticornia was made in 1880 by Joseph Dalton Hooker. The type species of this genus is Tecticornia cinerea (F. Muell.) Baill, which is a synonym of Tecticornia australasica. Tecticornia used to be a small genus with just three species, until in 2007, the genera Halosarcia, Pachycornia, Sclerostegia and Tegicornia were included.

Phylogenetical research of the subfamily Salicornioideae revealed that the Tecticornia/Halosarcia/Pachycornia/Sclerostegia/Tegicornia lineage is a sister group of Sarcocornia/Salicornia.

In 2016, Tecticornia comprises about 44 species, eleven species were described recently. (distributions as given by Australian Plant Census (2008).

- Tecticornia annelida K.A.Sheph. & M. Lyons - in Western Australia.
- Tecticornia arborea Paul G.Wilson (Bulli Bulli) - in Western Australia.
- Tecticornia arbuscula (R.Br.) K.A.Sheph. & Paul G.Wilson, (Shrubby Glasswort) - widely distributed in Australia (Western Australia, South Australia, New South Wales, Victoria, Tasmania).
- Tecticornia auriculata (Paul G.Wilson) K.A.Sheph. & Paul G.Wilson - in Western Australia.
- Tecticornia australasica (Moq.) Paul G.Wilson - in Northern Territory, Queensland.
- Tecticornia bibenda K.A.Sheph. & S.J.van Leeuwen - in Western Australia.
- Tecticornia bulbosa (Paul G.Wilson) K.A.Sheph. & PaulG.Wilson, (Large-articled Samphire) - Inland growing plant found in Western Australia and listed as being vulnerable to extinction.
- Tecticornia calyptrata (Paul G.Wilson) K.A.Sheph. & Paul G.Wilson - a divaricately branched shrub ranging to 1 metre in height. Found across Western Australia in both sandy and clay soils, salt lakes, and saline claypans.
- Tecticornia chartacea (Paul G.Wilson) K.A.Sheph. & Paul G.Wilson - in Western Australia.
- Tecticornia cupuliformis (Paul G.Wilson) K.A.Sheph. & Paul G.Wilson - in South Australia, Queensland
- Tecticornia cymbiformis K.A.Sheph. & Paul G.Wilson - in Western Australia.
- Tecticornia disarticulata (Paul G.Wilson) K.A.Sheph. & Paul G.Wilson - Western Australia, Northern Territory, New South Wales, Tasmania.
- Tecticornia doleiformis (Paul G.Wilson) K.A.Sheph. & Paul G.Wilson - in Western Australia.
- Tecticornia entrichoma (Paul G.Wilson) K.A.Sheph. & Paul G.Wilson - in Western Australia.
- Tecticornia fimbriata (Paul G.Wilson) K.A.Sheph. & Paul G.Wilson - in Western Australia.
- Tecticornia flabelliformis (Paul G.Wilson) K.A.Sheph. & Paul G.Wilson, (Bead Samphire or Bead Glasswort) - a woody, perennial, salt-tolerant plant growing up to 20 centimetres high in saltmarshes associated with salt lakes and saline flats and usually in monospecific patches. It is a deciduous shrub with fleshy branches, flowering and fruiting from January to May. T. flabelliformis is found in South Australia, Victoria and Western Australia with most of the population in South Australia. It is nationally listed as being vulnerable to extinction, with state by state listings as vulnerable in South Australia, threatened in Victoria and poorly known in Western Australia. (Eyelash Samphire)
- Tecticornia fontinalis (Paul G.Wilson) K.A.Sheph. & Paul G.Wilson - in South Australia.
- Tecticornia globulifera K.A.Sheph. - in Western Australia.
- Tecticornia halocnemoides (Nees) K.A.Sheph. & Paul G.Wilson, (Shrubby Samphire or Grey Glasswort) - widely distributed in Australia (Western Australia, Northern Territory, South Australia, Queensland, New South Wales, Victoria).
- Tecticornia indefessa K.A.Sheph. - in Western Australia.
- Tecticornia indica (Willd.) K.A.Sheph. & Paul G.Wilson - has several subspecies. Widely distributed in Australia (WA, NT, SA, Qld, NSW, Vic) and along tropical coasts of Indian Ocean from Southeast asia to South Asia, East Africa, Madagascar, southeastern Africa, and Atlantic coast of Senegal.
- Tecticornia laevigata K.A.Sheph. - in Western Australia.
- Tecticornia lepidosperma (Paul G.Wilson) K.A.Sheph. & Paul G.Wilson - in Western Australia, South Australia.
- Tecticornia leptoclada (Paul G.Wilson) K.A.Sheph. & Paul G.Wilson - in Western Australia.
- Tecticornia loriae K.A.Sheph. & M. Lyons - in Western Australia.
- Tecticornia lylei (Ewart & Jean White) K.A.Sheph. & Paul G.Wilson - in Western Australia, South Australia, New South Wales?, Victoria
- Tecticornia medullosa (Paul G.Wilson) K.A.Sheph. & Paul G.Wilson - in South Australia, Queensland, New South Wales.
- Tecticornia medusa K.A.Sheph. - in Western Australia.
- Tecticornia mellarium K.A.Sheph. - in Western Australia.
- Tecticornia moniliformis (Paul G.Wilson) K.A.Sheph. & Paul G.Wilson - in Western Australia, Victoria.
- Tecticornia nitida (Paul G.Wilson) K.A.Sheph. & Paul G.Wilson - in South Australia, Victoria
- Tecticornia papillata K.A.Sheph. - in Western Australia.
- Tecticornia peltata (Paul G.Wilson) K.A.Sheph. & Paul G.Wilson - in Western Australia.
- Tecticornia pergranulata (J.M.Black) K.A.Sheph. & Paul G.Wilson, (Samphire, Blackseed Glasswort or Blackseed Samphire) - found inland across much of Australia and, less often, in coastal saline areas.
- Tecticornia pluriflora (Paul G. Wilson) K.A.Sheph. & Paul G.Wilson - in South Australia, New South Wales
- Tecticornia pruinosa (Paulsen) K.A.Sheph. & Paul G.Wilson - in Western Australia, Northern Territory, South Australia, New South Wales, Victoria.
- Tecticornia pterygosperma (J.M.Black) K.A.Sheph. & Paul G.Wilson - in Western Australia, South Australia, New South Wales, Victoria
- Tecticornia sparagosa K.A.Sheph. & M. Lyons - in Western Australia.
- Tecticornia syncarpa (Paul G.Wilson) K.A.Sheph. & Paul G.Wilson - in Western Australia, South Australia, Victoria.
- Tecticornia tenuis (Benth.) K.A.Sheph. & Paul G.Wilson - in Western Australia, Northern Territory, South Australia, Queensland, New South Wales, Victoria.
- Tecticornia triandra (F.Muell.) K.A.Sheph. & Paul G.Wilson - in Western Australia, Northern Territory, South Australia, Queensland, New South Wales, Victoria.
- Tecticornia undulata (Paul G.Wilson) K.A.Sheph. & Paul G.Wilson - in Western Australia, Northern Territory, South Australia.
- Tecticornia uniflora (Paul G.Wilson) K.A.Sheph. & Paul G.Wilson, (Mat Samphire) - dioecious, with only one flower at each bract, - in Western Australia.
- Tecticornia verrucosa Paul G.Wilson - in Western Australia, Northern Territory, South Australia.

== Uses ==
Young twigs of Tecticornia indica can be cooked and eaten as a vegetable. In Madagascar, they are pickled in vinegar and used as a spice.
