= Althorpe Islands =

Islands of South Australia

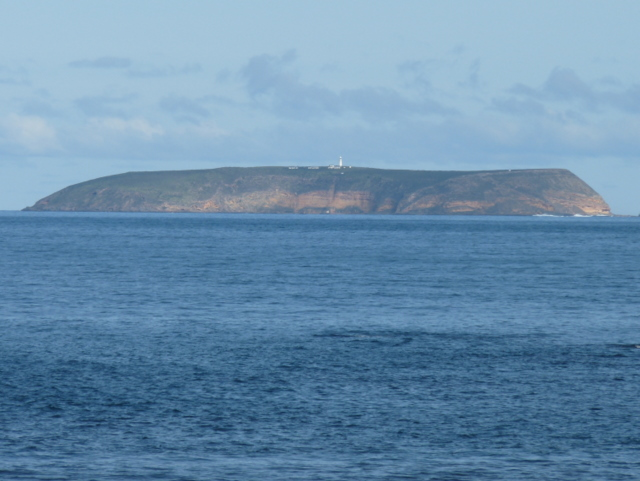
- Althorpe Island, South Australia

- Location within South Australia

Geography
- Location: Investigator Strait
- Coordinates: 35°22′S 136°52′E

Administration
- Australia

The Althorpe Islands are a group of islands in the Investigator Strait, off the south-western tip of Yorke Peninsula, South Australia. The group includes Althorpe Island and two rocky islets immediately to its west known as The Boobs. These are located 7.7 km south-southwest of Cape Spencer on the mainland. Closer inshore are Seal Island and Haystack Island, which together with Althorpe Island and The Boobs constitute the Althorpe Islands Conservation Park. A management plan for the Althorpe Islands Conservation Park was adopted in 2009. The islands are uninhabited and can only be accessed by sea or by helicopter.

== History ==
The islands was first sighted by Europeans on Saturday 20 March 1802 from HMS Investigator whilst under the command of Matthew Flinders. They are reportedly named after the family home of George Spencer, 2nd Earl Spencer, also known as Viscount Althorp, in Northamptonshire which is actually spelled as ‘Althorp'.

Sealers on the cutter Jane and Emma (Captain John Shaw) landed there in October 1851 and took a number of fur seals, Cape Barren Geese and mutton birds.

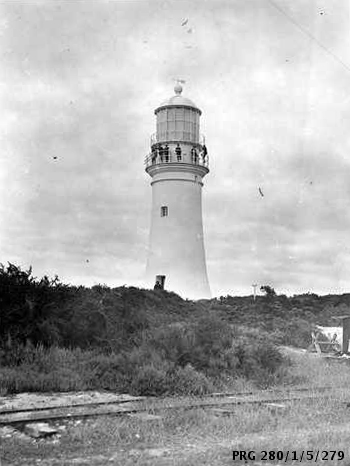
Althorpe Island lighthouse, South Australia, 1900 – State Library of South Australia – PRG280 1 5 279

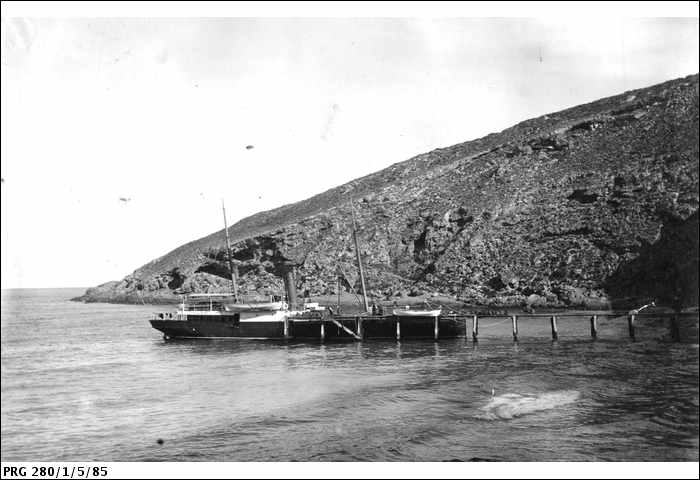
A steamship at the Althorpe Island jetty 1905 – State Library of South Australia PRG280 1 5 85

The lighthouse keepers’ cottages which stand today are of State Heritage significance and remain as evidence of the islands’ past contribution to maritime trade and safety. Construction of the Althorpe Island Lighthouse began in 1877. An accident claimed the life of the foreman of works in 1878, slowing the project's progress. Once complete, the lighthouse was operated and maintained by resident keepers from its first light in 1879 until it was demanned in 1991. C. A. Unbehaun supervised the laying of a submarine telephone cable in 1886 from the Althorpes to Cape Spencer. In 1961, Althorpe Island Airstrip was established with the purpose of servicing the lighthouse, and Commodore Aviation began flying in supplies and personnel by 1963.

The light is now automated and is maintained by the Australian Maritime Safety Authority.

== Heritage listings ==
Althorpe Island has a number of heritage-listed structures:

- Althorpe Island Jetty and Railway for Trolley
- Althorpe Island Lighthouse
- Althorpe Island Lighthouse Keepers' Cottages

== Environment ==
Althorpe Island was described in 1879 as "no means an abode of bliss, for it is bare and bleak. The vegetation is nothing but scrubby bushes a few inches high, which seem afraid to grow any bigger lest they be blown off; and the flat summit of the now inhabited island rock is swept by the wild winds that chase the rollers into foam on the rocks beneath."

== Wildlife ==
In 1845, the islands were described as being "frequented by penguins and Cape Barren geese". They support significant seabird colonies, including the state endangered white-bellied sea eagle (Haliaeetus leucogaster). The smaller islets of Althorpe Islands provide haul-out areas for nationally and state vulnerable Australian sea lion (Neophoca cinerea). In 1888, the islands were referred to as "the retreat of the penguins, gulls and seals".

An early written account of the native wildlife of Althorpe Island was printed in the South Australian Register in 1879:

"Mutton birds make their 'holey' habitations on all sides of the Althorpes; seals sport in secluded spots; swift seagulls and solemn shags make the welkin (whatever instrument that is) ring consumedly; penguins, like little lads in white pinafores, inhabit the nooks and crannies of the rocks... Sharks, sometimes of enormous size, may often be seen meandering softly round the ocean streets."

In 1951, a lighthouse keeper described the native wildlife at Althorpe Island:

"Penguins nest there in the mating season, and their young are to be seen in nooks and crannies around the shore. During the summer months, from September to March, mutton birds migrating from Siberia nest on the island in millions, digging their nests in the soil, under bushes and literally covering the ground... Years ago, seals were plentiful on the island, but owing to large scale slaughter during the early days of the State, few, if any, remain."

=== Little penguin colony ===
Accounts of little penguins on Althorpe Island were printed in various newspapers from 1845, 1846 1879, 1883, 1884, 1886, 1887, 1888, 1894, 1897 and 1902.

In 1845, penguins and Cape Barren geese were known to frequent Althorpe Island. In 1883, W. Reddan described Althorpe Island's little penguin colony, stating: "It is extraordinary the number of penguins on this island, they are everywhere." A visit of the Marine Board the following year noted that "Down on the rocks the penguins waddle about in large numbers."

In 1886, the penguins of Althorpe Island were briefly mentioned in The Advertiser: "pairs of whom were found peering with pensive eyes out of holes in the sandy rocks." In 1887, The South Australian Register also described them: "In crevices of the rocks innumerable birds find refuge, and in these and in holes in the sand the queer-shaped penguin also has its habitation."

In 1894, penguins were regarded as abundant along the rocks of the island and in 1897, visitors described "the eerie cry of the penguins" of Althorpe Island.

The steep track from the jetty to the island's summit passes by a cave known as the "Penguin Hotel". In 1902, a visitor described the cave, writing "the whole of the interior was honey-combed by penguins."

Little penguin breeding sites were noted in a 1996 survey of South Australia's offshore islands.

==== Little penguin decline ====
The little penguin (Eudyptula minor) colony on Althorpe Island appears to be in decline. This was initially inferred by contrasting historical accounts of their abundance with their relative scarcity, determined by a 2004 survey. In 2004, the population was 132 birds. In 2011, the colony was described as 'declining from “numerous” and “common” in 1982'. A survey conducted in 2013 estimated a population of 84 adult birds by counting burrow activity over half the island's breeding area. This survey's results support the previously inferred decline.

== Protected area status ==
The Althorpe Islands with exception to those areas under the control of the Australian government first obtained protected area status as a fauna conservation reserve declared under the Crown Lands Act 1929-1966 on 16 March 1967.

== See also ==
- List of little penguin colonies
