= Tecticornia arborea =

Scientific classification
- Kingdom: Plantae
- Clade: Tracheophytes
- Clade: Angiosperms
- Clade: Eudicots
- Order: Caryophyllales
- Family: Amaranthaceae
- Genus: Tecticornia
- Species: T. arborea

Binomial name
- Tecticornia arborea Paul G.Wilson

Species of plant in the family Amaranthaceae

Tecticornia arborea, the bulli bulli, is a species of flowering plant in the family Amaranthaceae, native to Western Australia. A short-lived perennial with a pyramidal growth form reaching 150 cm (60 in) tall, it is usually found growing in freshwater clay pans. Its seeds are edible and consumed by local peoples.
