= Western River Wilderness Protection Area =

Protected area in South Australia

- IUCN category Ib (wilderness area)
- Location within South Australia
- Location: South Australia
- Nearest city: Parndana
- Coordinates: 35°42′00″S 136°54′30″E
- Area: 24.67 km^{2} (9.53 sq mi)
- Established: 21 January 1971
- Governing body: Department for Environment and Water

Western River Wilderness Protection Area, formerly the Western River Conservation Park and the Western River National Park, is a protected area in the Australian state of South Australia located on the north coast of Kangaroo Island about 30 kilometres (19 mi) west of Parndana in the gazetted locality of Western River. Waterfall Creek, with its scenic Billy Goat Waterfall, are within the area.

== Description ==
The wilderness protection area has an area of 24.67 square kilometres (9.53 sq mi). The topography is rugged, with numerous steep slopes and deep gullies. The vegetation consists mainly of open forest, woodland and scrub associations dominated by Eucalyptus cladocalyx, E. baxteri, E. diversifolia and E. cosmophylla. There are also areas of Allocasuarina muelleriana open heath and A. verticillata low open forest. It contains nesting and feeding habitat for glossy black cockatoos.

The wilderness protection area is classified as an IUCN Category Ib protected area.

Scenic features include the coastal cliffs and the waterfall on Waterfall Creek, known as Billy Goat Waterfall or Falls (or Billygoat Falls).

== History ==
The land under protection first gained protected area status as the Western River National Park proclaimed on 21 January 1971 under the National Parks Act 1966 in respect to land in sections 8 and 47 in the cadastral unit of the Hundred of Gosse.

On 27 April 1972, the national park was reconstituted as the Western River Conservation Park under the National Parks and Wildlife Act 1972.

On 15 October 1993, the majority of its extent was proclaimed under the Wilderness Protection Act 1992 as a wilderness protection area with the remainder being added on the 5 October 2006.

In 1980, it was listed on the now-defunct Register of the National Estate.

== Wilderness qualities ==
The following qualities have been identified by the government agency managing the wilderness protection area:

While there are some relatively minor impacts of modern technology, the area has distinctive wilderness attributes and warrants protection and restoration in accordance with the provisions of the Act. In addition to its rugged terrain and high coastal cliffs that are characteristic of the northern coast of Kangaroo Island, Western River Wilderness Protection Area is highly valued for the presence of habitat for the endangered Glossy Black-cockatoo. Plant species diversity is high and the vegetation exhibits a wide cross-section of Kangaroo Island vegetation.
