= Tecticornia australasica =

Scientific classification
- Kingdom: Plantae
- Clade: Tracheophytes
- Clade: Angiosperms
- Clade: Eudicots
- Order: Caryophyllales
- Family: Amaranthaceae
- Genus: Tecticornia
- Species: T. australasica

Binomial name
- Tecticornia australasica (Moq.) Paul G.Wilson

Species of flowering plant

Tecticornia australasica, also known as grey samphire, is found in intermittent patches across tropical coastal regions of Australia.
