= Investigator Strait =

Body of water in South Australia

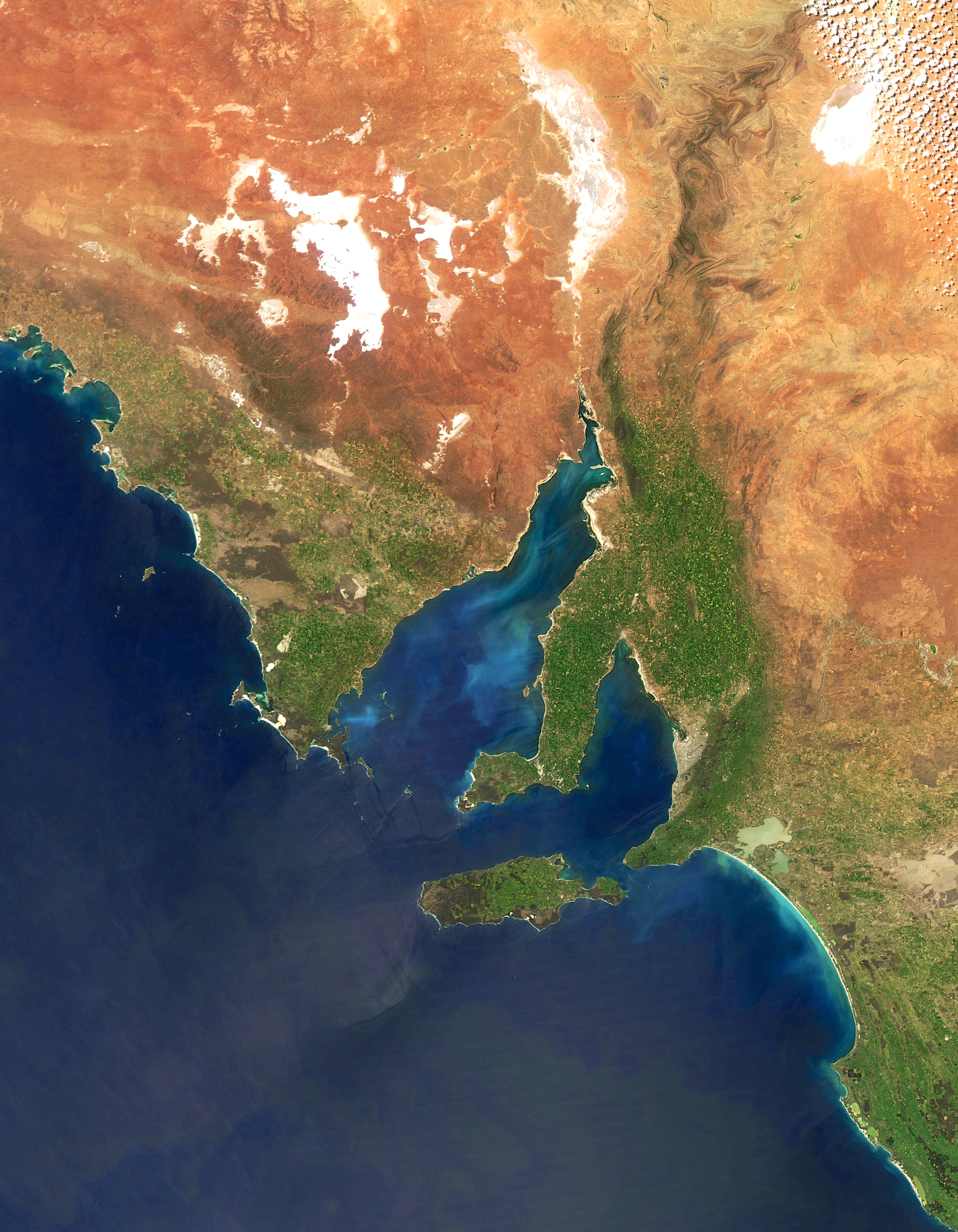
- Investigator Strait is the body of water between Yorke Peninsula (i.e. the central land mass) and Kangaroo Island

- Location within South Australia
- Location: Australia
- Coordinates: 35.4°S 137.6°E
- Basin countries: Australia
- Max. length: 135.3 km (84.1 mi)
- Max. width: 48 km (30 mi)
- Surface area: 6,100 km^{2} (2,400 sq mi)
- Average depth: 34 m (112 ft)
- Max. depth: 75 m (246 ft)
- Islands: Althorpes; Chinamans Hat; Haystack; Seal
- Settlements: Marion Bay, Stenhouse Bay, Cape Jervis, Stokes Bay, Emu Bay

Investigator Strait is a body of water in South Australia lying between the Yorke Peninsula, on the Australian mainland, and Kangaroo Island. It was named by Matthew Flinders after his ship, HMS Investigator, on his voyage of 1801–1802. It is bordered by the Gulf St Vincent in the northeast.

== Discovery and exploration ==
It was named Investigator’s Strait by Flinders on Monday 29 March 1802.

== Extent ==
Investigator Strait is bounded by Yorke Peninsula to its north and by Kangaroo Island to its south. Flinders identified its boundaries with the following adjoining bodies of water - Gulf St Vincent and Backstairs Passage. The Strait’s boundary with Gulf St Vincent is the line from Troubridge Point on Yorke Peninsula to Cape Jervis on Fleurieu Peninsula. Its boundary with Backstairs Passage is the line from Cape Jervis on Fleurieu Peninsula to Kangaroo Head (west of Penneshaw) on Kangaroo Island. Flinders noted that Backstairs Passage is a body of water separate to Investigator Strait. The boundary between the strait and Nepean Bay on the north-east coast of Kangaroo Island is a line between Point Marsden and Kangaroo Head. The Strait’s western boundary by definition is the line from Cape Spencer on Yorke Peninsula to Cape Borda on Kangaroo Island.

== Protected areas ==
A number of protected areas are located both within and adjoining the Strait’s extent.

=== Aquatic reserves ===
- Troubridge Hill west of Troubridge Point on the south coast of Yorke Peninsula.

=== Marine parks ===
- Southern Spencer Gulf Marine Park - the west end of the strait including the coasts of both Yorke Peninsula and Kangaroo Island.
- Lower Yorke Peninsula Marine Park - east end of the strait adjoining the south coast of Yorke Peninsula.
- Western Kangaroo Island Marine Park - west end of the strait adjoining the north coast of Kangaroo Island.
- Encounter Marine Park covers the east end of the strait including its boundaries with Nepean Bay and Backstairs Passage.

=== National parks and other reserves ===
The following reserves are located on the south coast of Yorke Peninsula (from west to east):

- Innes National Park (includes Chinamans Hat Island)
- Point Davenport Conservation Park

The following reserves are located on the north coast of Kangaroo Island (from west to east):

- Flinders Chase National Park
- Cape Torrens Wilderness Protection Area
- Western River Wilderness Protection Area

The following reserve is located on Althorpe Islands, Haystack Island and Seal Island at the north-west end of the strait:

- Althorpe Islands Conservation Park
