= Kelly Anne Shepherd =

Australian botanist

- Born: 1970
- Education: University of Western Australia
- Occupations: Botanical collector; scientific collector
- Scientific career
- Fields: Botany
- Workplaces: Western Australian Herbarium; Western Australian Herbarium (2006–)
- Author abbrev. (botany): K.A.Sheph.

Kelly Anne Shepherd (born 1970) is an Australian botanist, who has published some 91 names.

The standard author abbreviation K.A.Sheph. is used to indicate this person as the author when citing a botanical name.

== Career ==
Shepherd earned a B.Sc. (Hon) in 1992 with a thesis entitled "Faecal Analysis of Mammalian Herbivores in the Perup Forest, Western Australia." and a Ph.D. ("Systematic Analysis of the Australian Salicornioideae (Chenopodiaceae)" in 2005, both from the University of Western Australia.

From 2004 to 2005 she was a research scientist with the University of Western Australia and Botanic Gardens and Parks Authority. In 2006 she was a post doctoral researcher at the UK Millennium Seed Bank, working on seed dormancy on Australian species with undifferentiated species. From 2006 to 2009, she was a research scientist with the Western Australian Herbarium, where, since September 2009, she has been working as a senior research scientist.

In Western Australia, Shepherd has served as a senior research scientist at the Western Australian Herbarium (Department of Biodiversity, Conservation and Attractions), contributing to vascular plant taxonomy and conservation. In 2019–2021 she co-managed the golden-anniversary volume of Nuytsia, the journal of the Herbarium. She received a Winston Churchill Memorial Trust Fellowship to examine historic Australian type collections in UK herbaria.

== Selected publications ==
- Shepherd, K.A. (2007). "Three new species of Tecticornia (formerly Halosarcia) (Chenopodiaceae: Salicornioideae) from the Eremaean Botanical Province, Western Australia" (PDF). Nuytsia. 17: 353–366.
- Shepherd, K.A. (2007). "Tecticornia indefessa (Chenopodiaceae: Salicornioideae), a new mat samphire (formerly Tegicornia) from north of Esperance, Western Australia" (PDF). Nuytsia. 17: 367–374.
- Shepherd, Kelly A.; Wilson, Paul G. (2007). "Incorporation of the Australian genera Halosarcia, Pachycornia, Sclerostegia and Tegicornia into Tecticornia (Salicornioideae, Chenopodiaceae)". Australian Systematic Botany. 20 (4): 319. doi:10.1071/SB07002. ISSN 1030-1887.
- Shepherd, K.A. (2007). "Pityrodia iphthima (Lamiaceae), a new species endemic to banded ironstone in Western Australia, with notes on two informally recognised Pityrodia" (PDF). Nuytsia. 17: 347–352.
- Shepherd, K.A. & van Leeuwen, S.J. (2007). "Tecticornia bibenda (Chenopodiaceae: Salicornioideae), a new C4 samphire from the Little Sandy Desert, Western Australia" (PDF). Nuytsia. 16 (2): 383–391.
- Shepherd, K.A. (2008). "Tecticornia papillata (Chenopodiaceae: Salicornioideae), a new andromonoecious samphire from near the Carnarvon Range, Western Australia" (PDF). Nuytsia. 18: 259–266.
- Shepherd, K.A. & Wilson, P.G. (2008). "New combinations in the genus Dysphania (Chenopodiaceae)" (PDF). Nuytsia. 18: 267–272.
- Shepherd, K.A. & Lyons, M.N. (2009). "Three new species of Tecticornia (Chenopodiaceae, subfamily Salicornioideae) identified through Salinity Action Plan surveys of the central wheatbelt region, Western Australia" (PDF). Nuytsia. 19 (1): 167–180.
- Shepherd, K.; van Leeuwen, S. (2011). "Tecticornia globulifera and T. medusa (subfamily Salicornioideae: Chenopodiaceae), two new priority samphires from the Fortescue Marsh in the Pilbara region of Western Australia". Telopea. 13 (1–2): 349–358. doi:10.7751/telopea20116026.
- Shepherd, K.A.; Thiele, K.R.; Sampson, J.; Coates, D.; Byrne, M. (2015). "A rare, new species of Atriplex (Chenopodiaceae) comprising two genetically distinct but morphologically cryptic populations in arid Western Australia: implications for taxonomy and conservation". Australian Systematic Botany. 28 (4): 234. doi:10.1071/SB15029. ISSN 1030-1887. S2CID 85903596.
- Shepherd, K.A. & Thiele, K.R. (2017). "Teucrium disjunctum, a new name for Spartothamnella canescens (Lamiaceae)" (PDF). Nuytsia. 28: 139–140.

== See also ==
- Category:Taxa named by Kelly Anne Shepherd
