= SS The Emerald =

American cruise ship

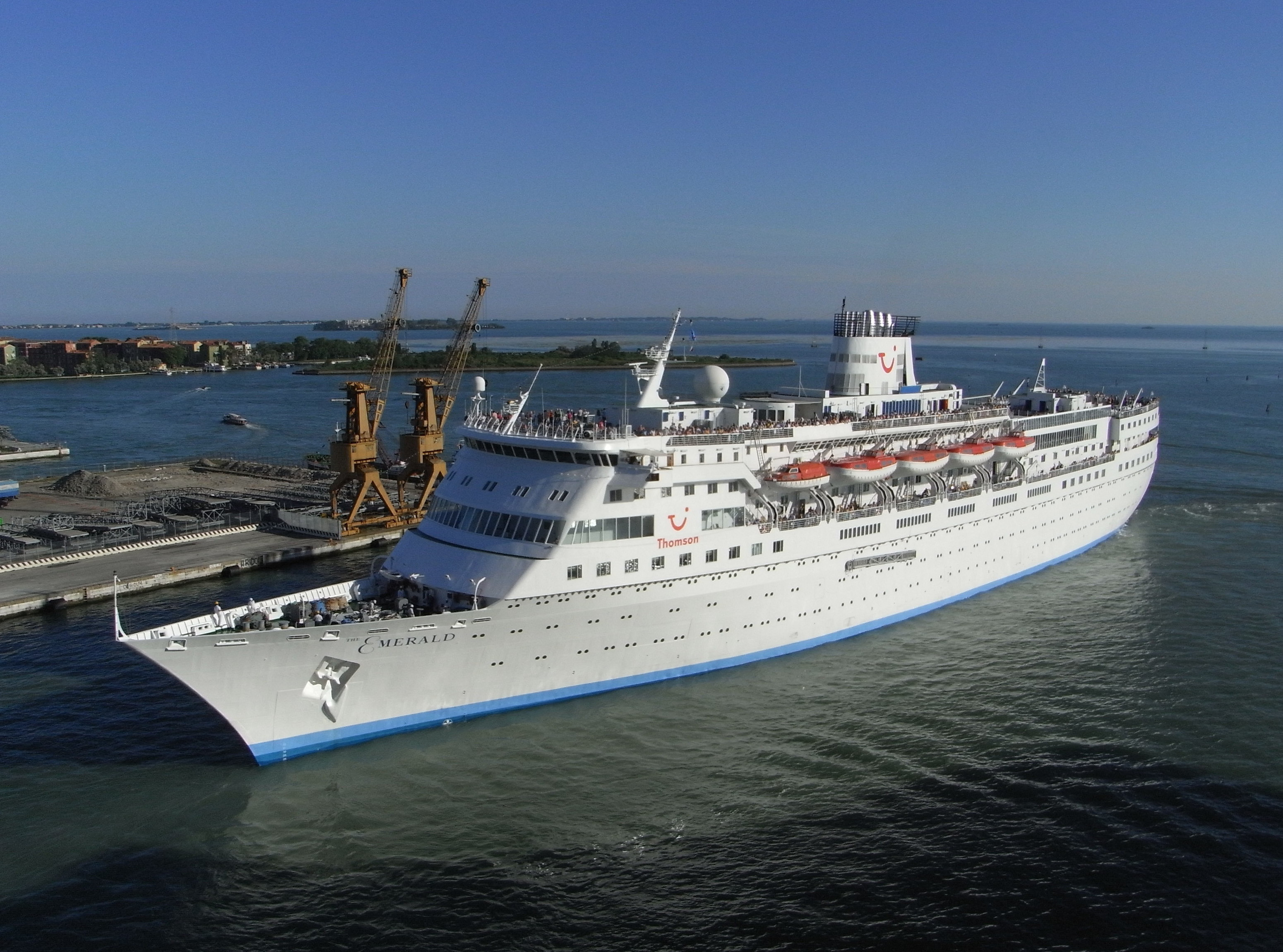
- The Emerald in 2008

History
- Name: 1958–1976: Santa Rosa; 1976–1990: Samos Sky; 1990: Pacific Sun; 1990–1992: Diamond Island; 1992–1996: Regent Rainbow; 1996–2012: The Emerald; 2012: Emerald
- Owner: 1958–1970: Grace Line; 1970–1975: Prudential-Grace Line; 1975–1976: U.S. Department of Commerce; 1976–1989: Vintero Corp.; 1989–1992: Lelakis Group; 1992–1996: Regency Cruises; 1996–2012: Louis Cruise Lines
- Operator: 1958–1970: Grace Line; 1970–1971: Prudential-Grace Line; 1971-1992: Laid up; 1992–1995: Regency Cruises; 1997–2008: Thomson Cruises; 2008–2009: Louis Cruise Lines; 2009-2012: Laid up
- Port of registry: 1997–1998: Nassau, Bahamas; 1998–2002: Limassol, Cyprus; 2002: Nassau, Bahamas; 2009–2012: Pireus, Greece; 2012: Basseterre, Saint Kitts and Nevis
- Builder: Newport News Shipbuilding and Drydock
- Cost: US $25 million
- Yard number: 521
- Laid down: January 15, 1957
- Launched: August 28, 1957
- Completed: June 19, 1958
- Maiden voyage: June 28, 1958
- Out of service: 2009
- Identification: Call sign: V4MR2; IMO number: 5312824; MMSI number: 239942000
- Fate: Scrapped in 2012

General characteristics (as built)
- Type: Ocean liner
- Tonnage: 15,371 GRT
- Length: 177.88 m (584 ft)
- Beam: 25.6 m (84 ft 0 in)
- Speed: 17 knots (31 km/h; 20 mph)
- Capacity: 546 passengers

General characteristics (1991 onwards)
- Type: Cruise ship
- Tonnage: 26,431 GRT; 8,713 DWT
- Capacity: 1,198 passengers
- Crew: 412

SS The Emerald was a cruise ship owned by Louis Cruise Lines (now Celestyal Cruises). She was built in 1958 by the Newport News Shipbuilding and Drydock company in Newport News, Virginia, United States, for the Grace Line, as the ocean liner Santa Rosa. Between 1992 and 1995, she sailed for Regency Cruises as Regent Rainbow and between 1997 and 2008, she sailed for Thomson Cruises (now Marella Cruises) as The Emerald. Before retiring in 2009, she was the last passenger ship built at a U.S. shipyard that was still in active service.

== Design and construction ==
In 1956, the Grace Line ordered two new ships to replace the aging 1932-built sisters, Santa Rosa and Santa Paula. Gibbs & Cox had designed the older two ships and would now design their successors. These modern ocean liners were built by Newport News Shipbuilding and Drydock, Newport News, Virginia, USA and were among the last passenger ocean liners built entirely in the U.S. There was full air conditioning for passengers, and the first ships in America to be equipped with Gyrofin stabilizers.

The interior was fireproofed with aluminum, and designed by Dorothy Marckwald & Anne Urquhart, the same designers that did the interiors for the SS America and SS United States. Accommodations were spacious with all cabins facing outside, and every cabin had its own bathroom. The Santa Rosa's had two aft cargo holds had side doors and automatic conveyors to quickly move pallets on and off the ship, thus giving her a rapid turn-around at port. Santa Rosa was launched on August 28, 1957, and delivered on June 12, 1958.

== Career ==
=== 1958–1971: Santa Rosa ===
'Postcard of Santa Rosa for Grace Line, c. 1960

The new Santa Rosa and Santa Paula entered service on the New York to South America and the Caribbean for Grace Line. The Santa Rosa made its maiden voyage on Oct. 10, 1958, when it became the largest ship ever to make the voyage up the Hudson River to Albany, N.Y. She also became the first major passenger liner to make her maiden appearance in New York harbor from the north.

==== Collision with SS Valchem ====
In the early morning hours of March 26, 1959, Santa Rosa was returning to New York in heavy fog. She was 22 miles east of Atlantic City, N.J., when she collided with the tanker SS Valchem. No one was injured on the liner but four crewmen on the tanker were killed and 16 were injured. Santa Rosa's bow punched a cavity extending halfway into the tanker and caused flooding of the lower engine room with resultant loss of power. Two boilers were also demolished. The funnel of the Valchem and adjacent vents were scooped off the tanker and carried onto Santa Rosa's bow. Santa Rosa sustained heavy damage but was repaired and returned to service.

=== 1971–1992: Lay-up and Modernisation ===
In 1970, the Grace Line merged with Prudential Lines to become Prudential-Grace Line. Santa Rosa sailed for another year but in 1971, passenger operations ceased and both she and the Santa Paula were laid up at Hampton Roads in Virginia and put up for sale. In 1975, Santa Rosa was obtained by the U.S. Department of Commerce and in 1976, she was sold to Vintero Corp. of New York City and renamed Samos Sky. She was intended to operate South American service once again, but this venture failed and she remained idle. In 1989, she was sold to Coral Cruise Lines, part of the Lelakis Group, and towed to Greece that December. In March 1990, Samos Sky arrived in Chalkis, Greece and was renamed Pacific Sun and then, later that year, Diamond Island. At the cost of $70 million, she was converted into a cruise ship; her superstructure was expanded, whilst her hull remained largely unaltered and she retained her original steam turbine engines, which were renovated with parts from the former Santa Paula. The work was finished in 1991.

=== 1992–2009: Regent Rainbow and The Emerald ===
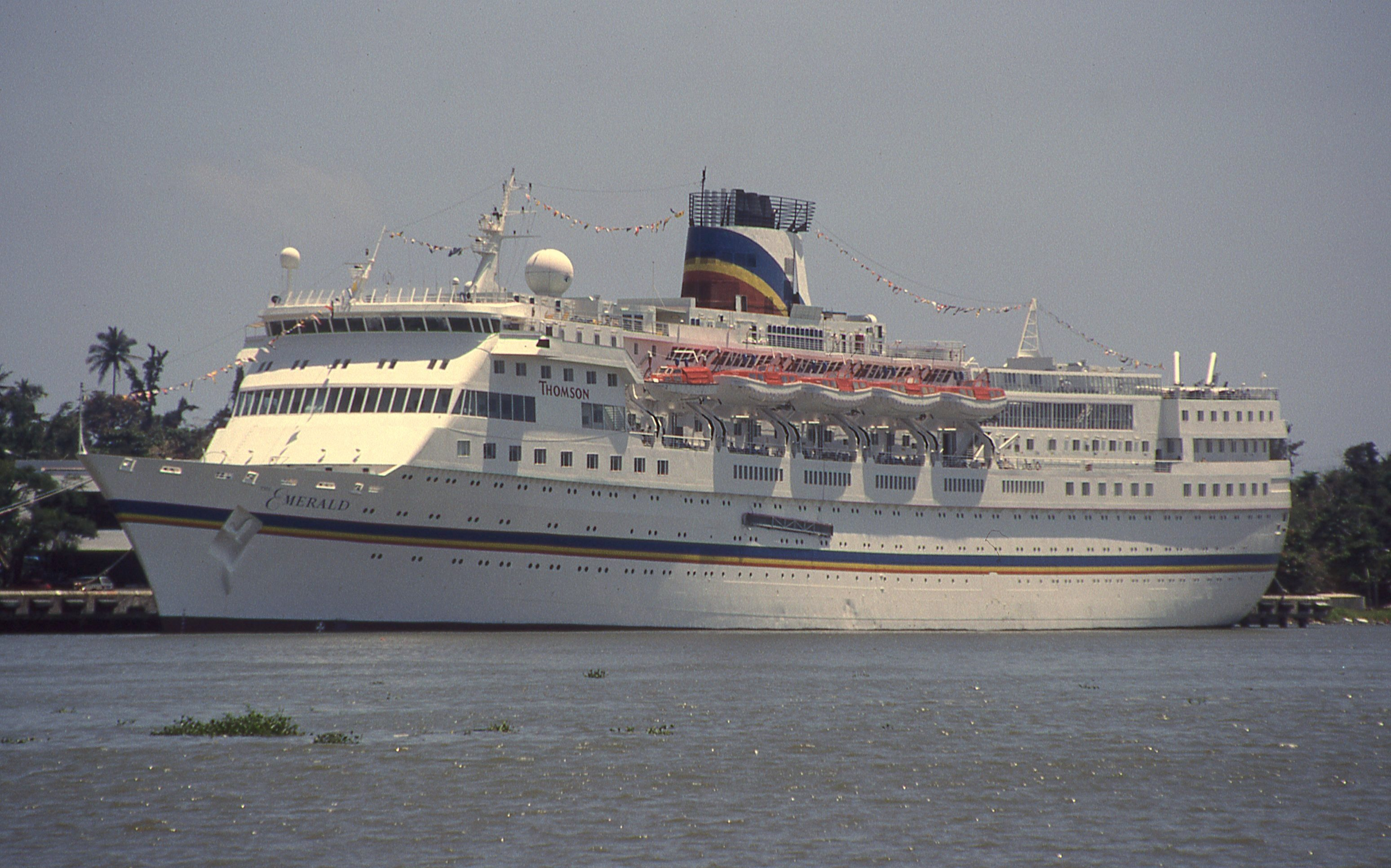
The Emerald, modernised, in Santo Domingo, Dominican Republic, 1999

The modernised ship entered service under Regency Cruises as the popular Regent Rainbow in 1992, until Regency Cruises suffered extensive losses and was declared bankrupt in 1995. Regent Rainbow was placed under arrest that November. In December 1996, Regent Rainbow was sold to Louis Cruise Lines and renamed The Emerald. In 1997, she was chartered to Thomson Cruises to operate cruises for the British market. During her time with Thomson she became the company's most popular ship, and remained in service with them until October 2008, when she was dropped in favor of a larger, more modern and economical vessel. Hereafter, she saw limited further service for Louis until 2009, when the company announced that she was being laid up and most likely would not sail again.

== Retirement ==
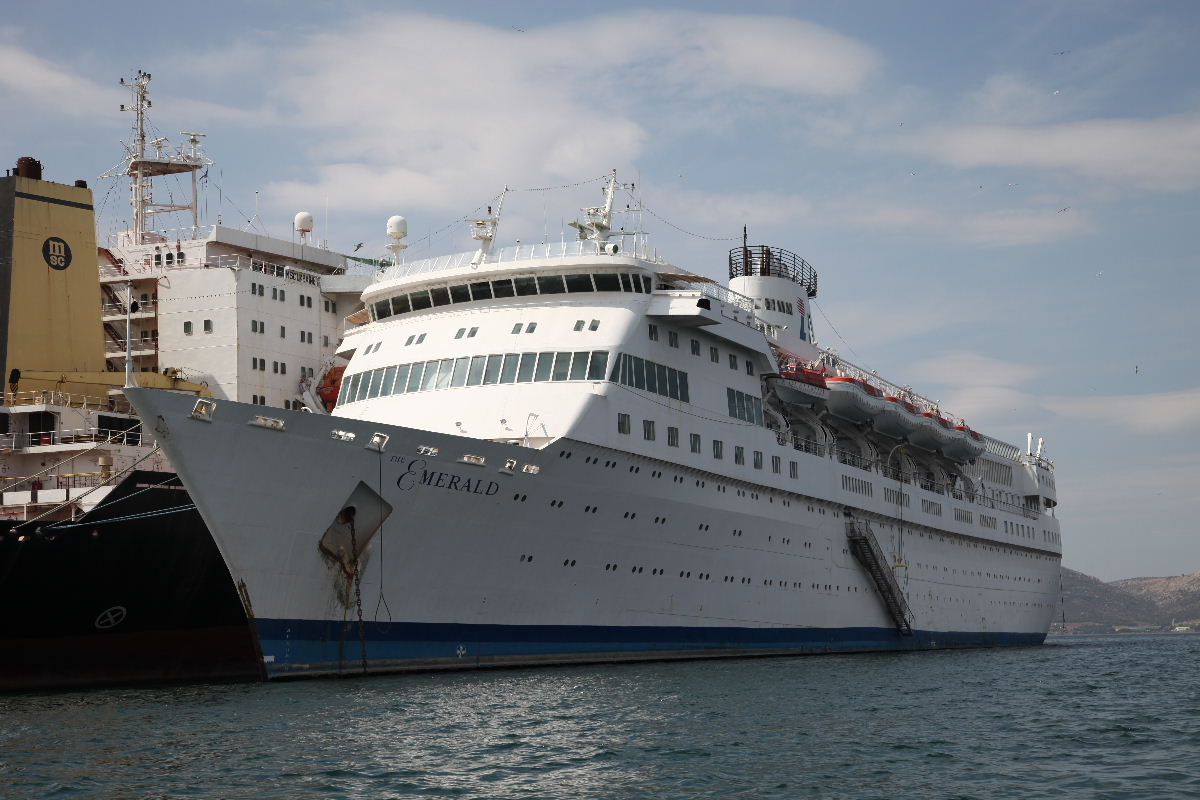
The Emerald laid up in Eleusis, Greece, 2010

Following the departure of The Emerald from their service, Louis looked for other owners who would operate her for further use, since she met SOLAS 2010 regulations, but she remained laid up at Eleusis, Greece. In 2011, she was inspected by scrappers and in July 2012, she departed Greece for the scrapyard at Alang, India. She was scrapped under the shortened name Emerald.
