= Naval Base Fiji =

Former naval base of the United States

Location of Naval Base Fiji on the Fiji Islands in the Pacific United States Navy (1942–1945)

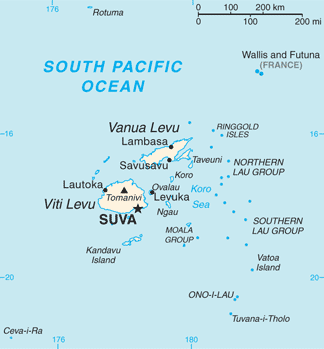
Map of the many Fiji Islands

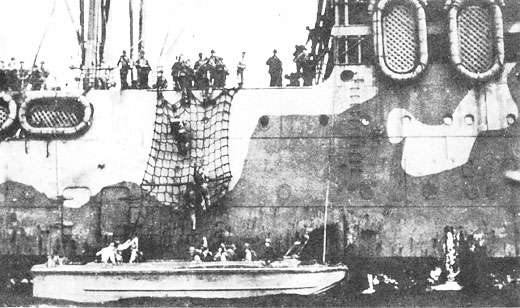
US Marines enter a landing boat at Fiji 28 July 1942, to practice amphibious landings to prepare for the landings at Guadalcanal

Naval Base Fiji was a naval base built by the United States Navy in 1942 to support the World War II effort. The base was located on Fiji in the Central Pacific Ocean. The base was built as one of many advance bases in the island-hopping campaign towards the Empire of Japan. The US Navy built seaports, seaplane bases and airfields used for staging in the Pacific War.

== History ==
In 1942 Fiji was a British colony, when Japan's Pacific aggression started in the late 1930s. The United Kingdom worked with New Zealand to build up the defense of the Island. New Zealand drew up plans for the defense of Fiji in April 1939. United Kingdom, New Zealand, and Fiji agreed to the plans which called for air bases, seaplane base, coastal batteries, and other defense on the Fiji Islands. The number of Troops sent would not have been enough to defend Fiji had it been invaded. Most troops were sent to the key Suva Peninsula and nearby Nandali airfield. New Zealand built a system of underground bases with a hospital, supply depot, headquarters and more. A depot and 300-bed hospital were built at Tamavua. Fiji College of Advance Education was used as a hospital during the war. With the rapid expansion of Japan in 1942 and 1943, Fiji was under threat of Japanese invasion in 1942 and part of 1943. Japan had made plans to invade Fiji, called Operation FS, but this was canceled after the major defeat at the Battle of Midway.

After the Attack on Pearl Harbor on 7 December 1941, it was agreed that the United States Armed Forces could use Fiji as a staging base and training base. United States Armed Forces took over much of the operation of the airfields and seaplane bases. Fiji was a key point on the long shipping route from the United States to South Pacific bases, including major bases in Australia. On 13 May 1942, the United States issued a document called "Joint Army and Navy Plan for the Relief of New Zealand in Fiji and Tonga". The plan requests the replacement of the 10,000 New Zealand troops with US Troops. The New Zealand troops freed up went on to fight in the Solomon Islands. Part of the plan called for the US Navy to build an 80,500-barrel tank farm near Nandi, on Fiji's west coast. The US Navy's Seabee 3rd Construction Battalion formed at Camp Allen was sent to Fiji to start new construction and expansion of existing bases on Viti Levu, Fiji's main island. Work started at the tank farm at Nandi and the port at Suva, Fiji's main port. The hospital ship USS Solace was a regular visiter to Fiji. On 28 July 1942, the US Navy and US Marine did a practice amphibious landing at Fiji's Koro Island. This was to prepare the troops for the upcoming landings at Guadalcanal, the Troop's first major offensive of the War. From the rehearsal, lessons were learned that helped at Guadalcanal. On 31 July 1942, the Troops departed Fiji for the invasion of Guadalcanal. During the Pacific War, 8,000 Fijian troops fought with the Allies in the Solomon Islands campaign and Bougainville campaign. At Suva large staging base was built. Fiji also became a rest and recuperation base for troops fighting in the Pacific War. As the war moved closer to Japan most operations had moved closer to Japan at more advanced bases. By August 1944 most operations at Fiji had been moved out.

== Port of Suva ==
Naval Headquarters was at the Fiji capital, the city of Suva, on the main Fiji Island, Viti Levu. Port of Suva had good fleet anchorage. King's Wharf was one of the main docking ports. King's wharf was built on reclaimed land during World War I and replaced the smaller Queen's wharf on Pier Street. The US Navy gave the Suva Naval Headquarters the code name Fantan Two. Suva Navy Fleet Post Office was No. 202 – Suva, Viti Levu, Fiji Islands 130 SF Suva, Fiji Islands. General mail was sent to Fantan Fleet Post Office No. 305 Fiji Islands. The existing Port of Suva was used by the Navy. Port of Suva offered good fleet anchorage. Located at 18.1186°S 178.40°E.

== Port of Nadi ==
Nadi Bay offered an excellent anchorage. The US Navy built a new advance naval base and camp at Nadi, code name Jampuff. The port base also supported the Nadi airfield built by New Zealand forces. Nadi airfield had two bomber concrete runways each 7,000 feet long (2130 meter). The US Navy Seabee's built Carrier Aircraft Service Unit No. 9 at Nadi. Port of Nadi location at 17.7697°S 177.383°E. At Nadi Bay was Seaplane Base Nadi with seaplane tenders USS Mackinac and USS Ballard. VP-23, Patrol Squadron 23, known as the Seahawks was stationed at Seaplane Base Nadi with Consolidated PBY Catalina, including black Cats, night fighters.

== Port of Lautoka ==
Port of Lautoka on the western coast of Viti Levu Island was built by the Navy. Seabees 3rd Construction Battalion, Company C built a jetty 60 feet long and 300 feet wide for loading and unloading of ships. The port was used to support Lautoka Airfield. Also at Lautoka was a New Zealand Army, 3rd Division, 30th Battalion camp. At location 17.6046°S 177.4391°E.

== Port of Tomba Ko Nandi ==
Port of Tomba Ko Nandi was used for fleet anchorage and docking. Tomba Ko Nandi Port is located on the west shore of Viti Levu Island, near the city of Nasoso, at 17.7286°S 177.4247°E.

== Lauthala Bay Seaplane Base ==
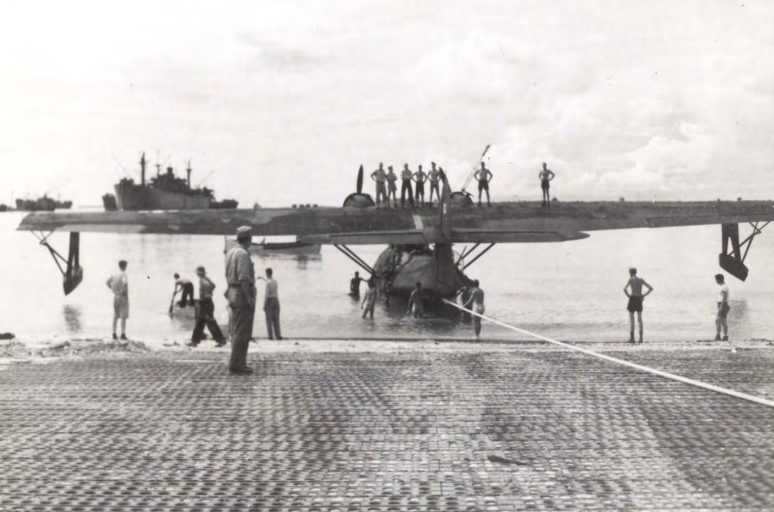
Seebee 3rd Construction Battalion at Fiji in 1943. Working on a VP-91 Consolidated PBY Catalina

Lauthala Bay Seaplane Base was at Lauthala Bay, also called Laucala Bay, built by New Zealand and taken over by US, to the east of the city of Suva on the southern coast of Viti Levu. Island. From 1944 to 1945, the US Navy Navy Air Transport Service (NATS) operated from Lauthala Bay Seaplane Base. During 1945, The Royal New Zealand Air Force operated Short Sunderland from the base in 1945. At location 18.1482°S 178.4609°E. Based at Lauthala Bay Seaplane Base was VP-91, Patrol Squadron 91 with Consolidated PBY Catalina.

== Saweni Bay Seaplane Base ==
Saweni Bay Seaplane Base, also called Saweni Beach Seaplane Base, was at Saweni, on Saweni Bay, north of Lauwaki on the northwest part of Viti Levu Island in Fiji. The base was 10 miles north of Nadi Airfield. The base was built by the Seabees 3rd Construction Battalion starting July 1942. VP-11, with six Consolidated PBY Catalina, started operating at the base on 4 August 1942. Patrol from the base went north to cover the Solomon Island for the upcoming campaigns. VP-11 also had operations at Naval Base Noumea. By August 1944 Fiji was now far from the active front and the base was closed, as operations had been moved to more forward bases. The Base was operated by Naval Construction Maintenance Unit 503, which depart at the closure. At Saweni Bay was the Seabees camp and supply depot. At location 17.646154°S 177.392614°E.

== Fleet Recreation Center ==
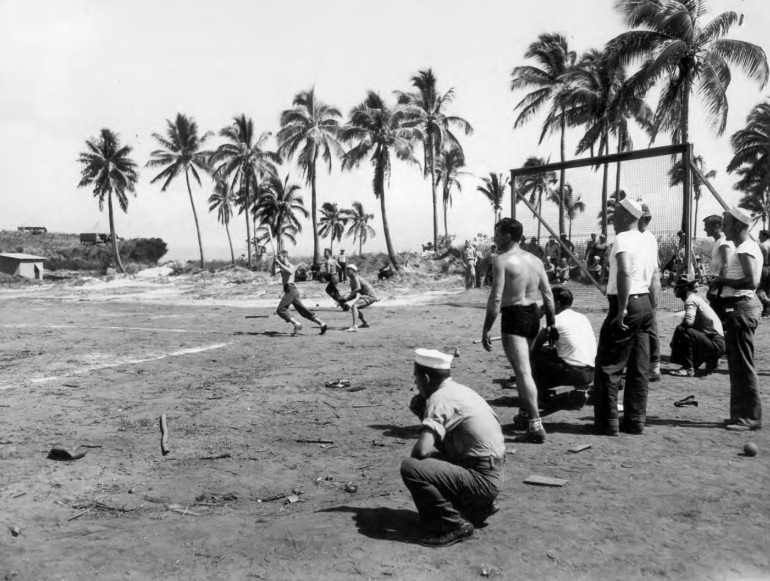
US Navy Seabees built a Fleet Recreation Center at Vunda Point, Fiji

The US Navy Seabees built a Fleet Recreation Center at Vunda Point on the west shore of Viti Levu. Located at 17°40′S 177°22.99′E, just south of Saweni Bay Seaplane Base on the Dreketi inlet. Troops of the 1st Marine Division that were in the Battle of Guadalcanal were able to rest at Fiji before the next campaign, Battle of Cape Gloucester.

== Airfields ==
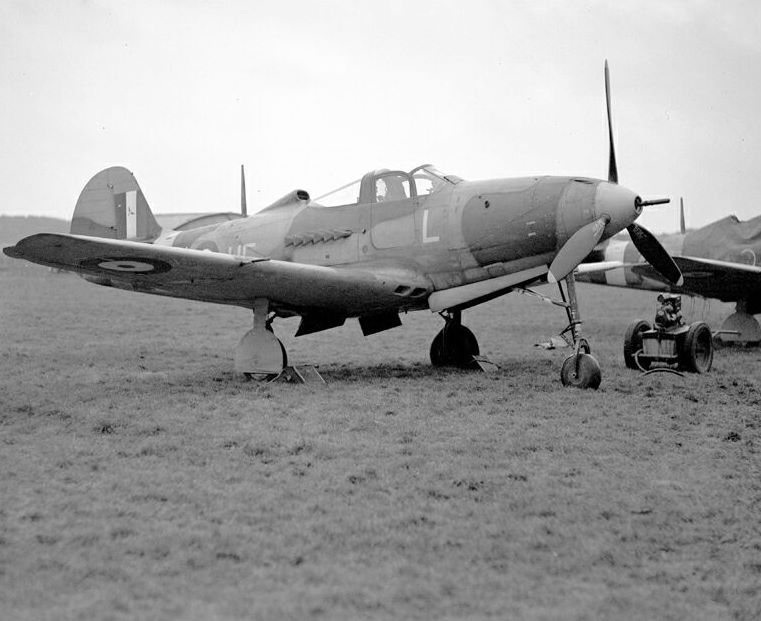
Bell P-39 Airacobra assembled and tested at Fiji

- Nadi Airfield, Naval Air Facility Nandi, now Nadi International Airport, at Nadi on Viti Levu west shore. Built by New Zealand, taken over by US. Fleet Post office was Fantan-1 No. 201 SF Nandi, Fiji Islands. The large fuel depot Fleet Post Office was No. 516 SF Fiji Islands.
- Lautoka Airfield, Viti Levu west shore, now abandoned, was used for pilot training by US Army and Royal New Zealand Air Force (RNZAF). Crated Bell P-39 Airacobra shipped from the USA were reassembled and tested at the Airfield by the 67th Fighter Squadron.
- Namaka Airfield, near Nadion on Viti Levu west shore. In the summer of 1942, used by US Army Air Force for Boeing B-17 Flying Fortress of the 11th Bombardment Group.
- Nandali Airfield on Yasawa Island.
- Suva Airfield on Viti Levu south shore near city of Suva, now Nausori International Airport. Built by Navy Seabees in 1942.
- Narewa Airfield on Viti Levu north shore. Narawa Airfield had two 5,000 feet long (1520 meter) clay-gravel runways.

== Seabees ==
Seabees based at Naval Base Fiji:

- 3rd Construction Battalion (C and D) (1942–1944) Much of the unit departed 4 June 1943, for work at Naval Base Funafuti in the Ellice Islands and Naval Base Noumea. Work was turned over to CBMU 503.
- Seabee Construction Battalion Maintenance Unit, CBMU 503 (1943–1944)
- Bobcat 3, 1944
- 6th Special NCB, first Seabee Special Unit, combat assault unit sent to Guadalcanal. (15 May 1943 – 29 December 1943)

== Attacks and losses ==
- HMNZS Monowai (F59) and SS Taroona were attacked by Japanese submarine I-20 off Fiji on 16 January 1943. Both ships were saved by torpedoes that exploded to soon.
- SS Thomas A. Edison a Liberty ship became grounded and sank on Vuata Vatoa, a Fiji Island during a hurricane on 1 January 1943. The US Navy ship USS Grebe was grounded and sank in the rescue attempt.
- SS Cape San Juan a Troopship Type C1-B cargo ship was torpedoed and damaged off Viti Levu at (22°08′S 178°06′E) by I-21. The attack killed 130 troops, survivors were rescued by USS Dempsey, USS McCalla and Edwin T. Merideth. The Cape San Juan sank the next day.

== Post war ==
- Suva Memorial, remembers the 34 World War II casualties of the Fiji Military that have no known grave, that are Missing in Action (MIA), twenty-six buried elsewhere in Fiji and Rotuma and eight lost on Bougainville and New Georgia.
- War Memorial Plaque at the Colonial War Memorial Hospital for Fijian and British Troops.
- Levuka Fijian War Memorial, the memorial commemorates the Fijians who died during the Second World War.

== Gallery ==
File:South Pacific islands in 1945

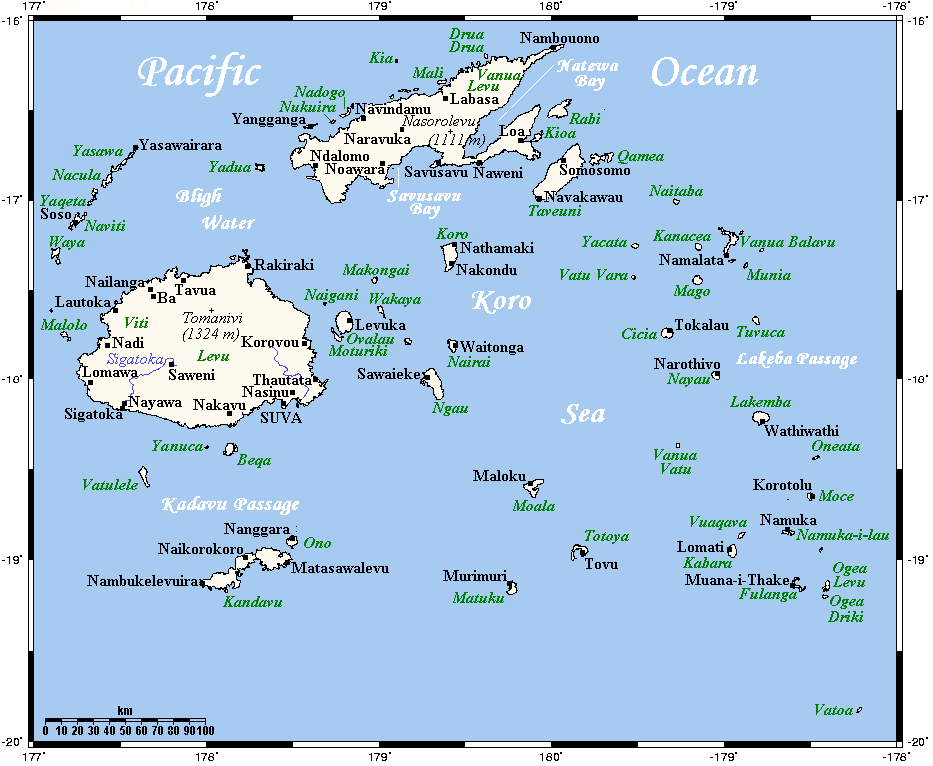
Fji Islands and cities

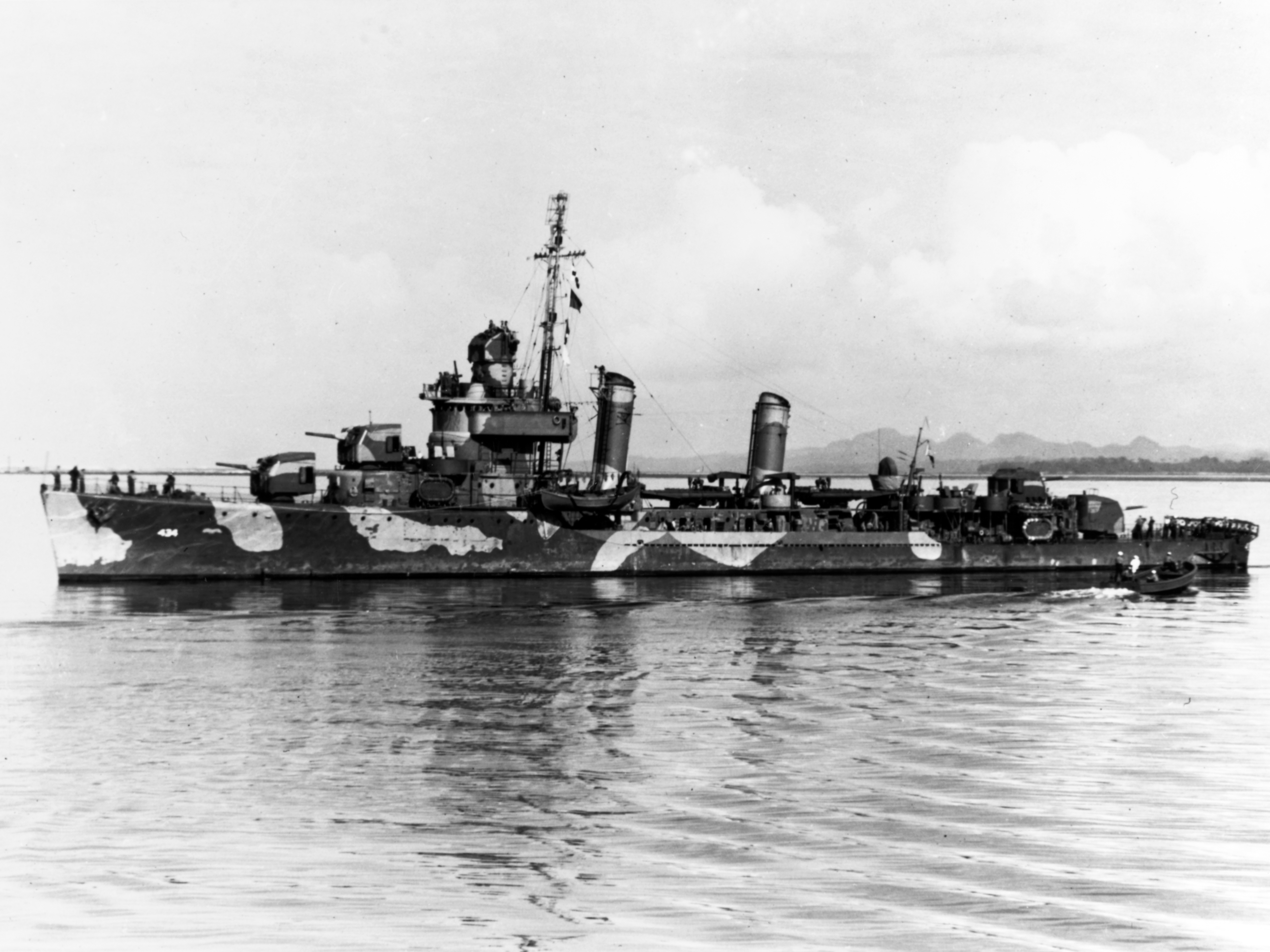
USS Meredith at Suva, Fiji Islands, 23 June 1942, in dazzle camouflage.

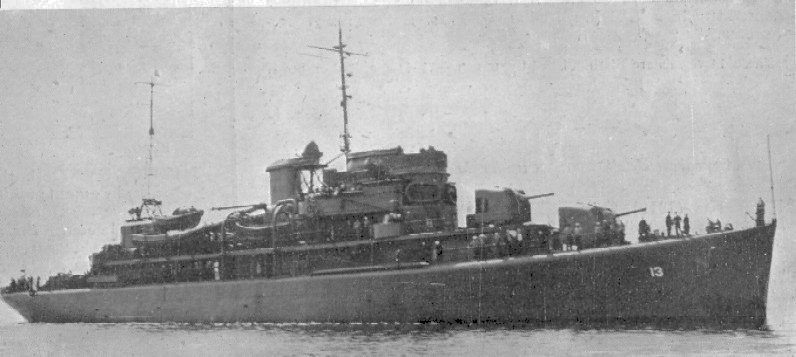
USS Mackinac seaplane tender station at Fiji

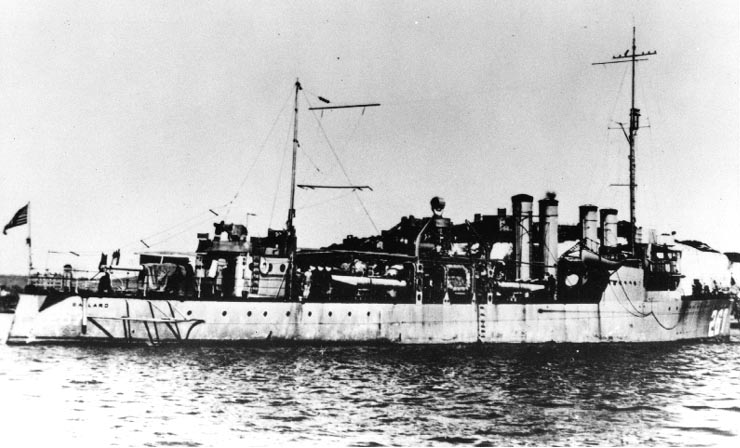
USS Ballard destroyer converted to seaplane tender station at Fiji

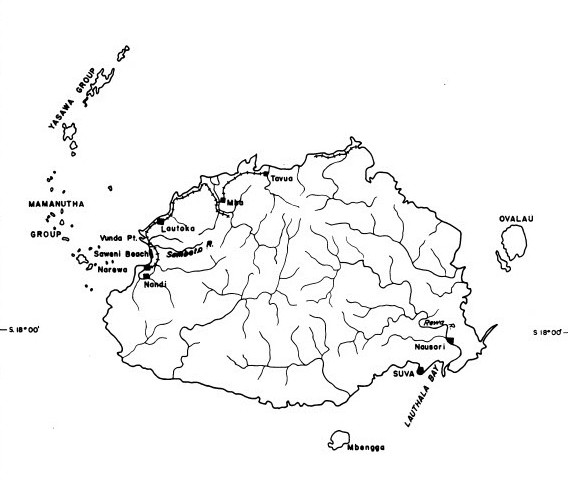
Fji and the Viti Levu Islands

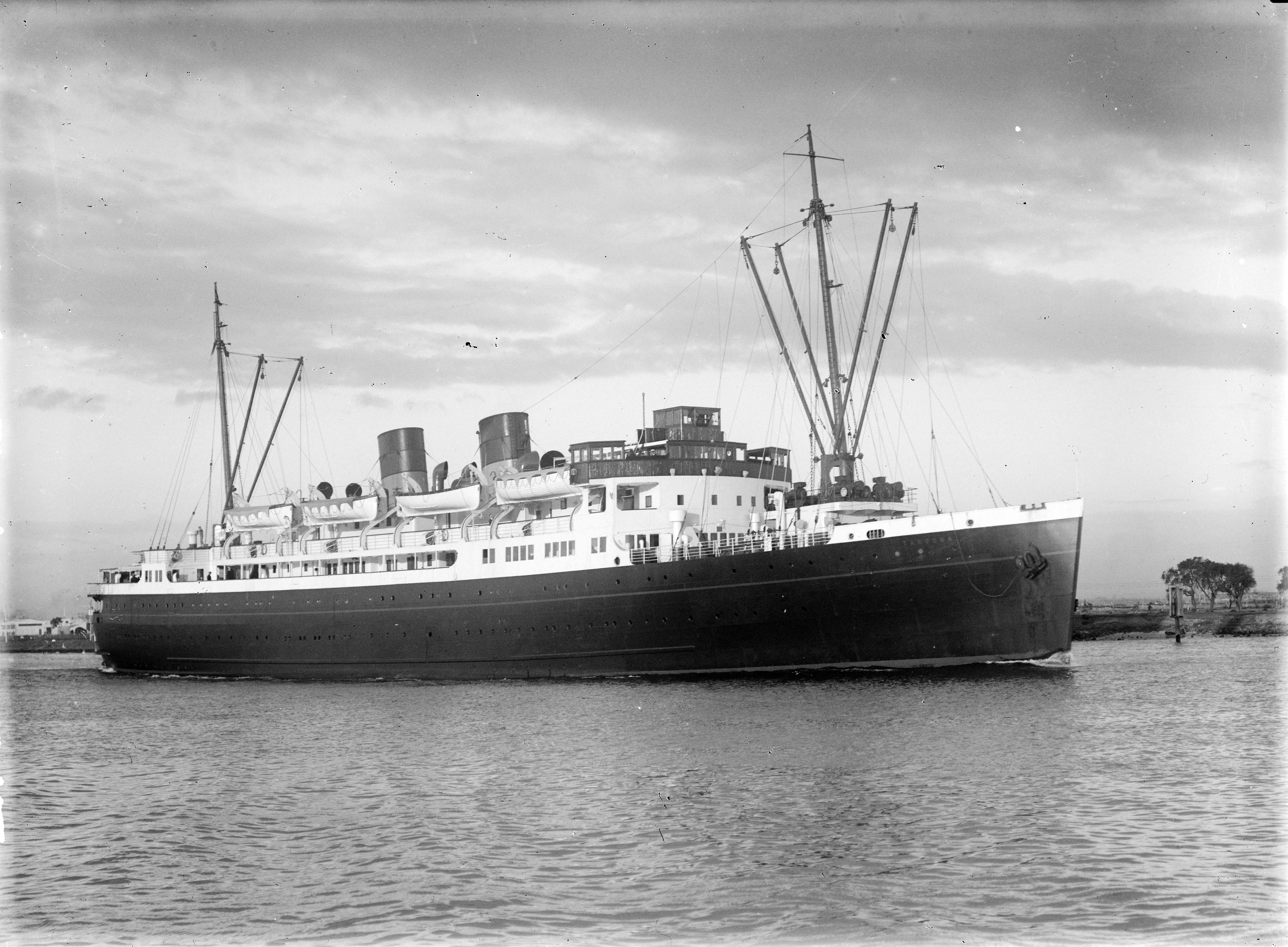
SS Taroona survived an attacked off Fiji by Japanese submarine I-21 when I-21's torpedoes exploded to soon.

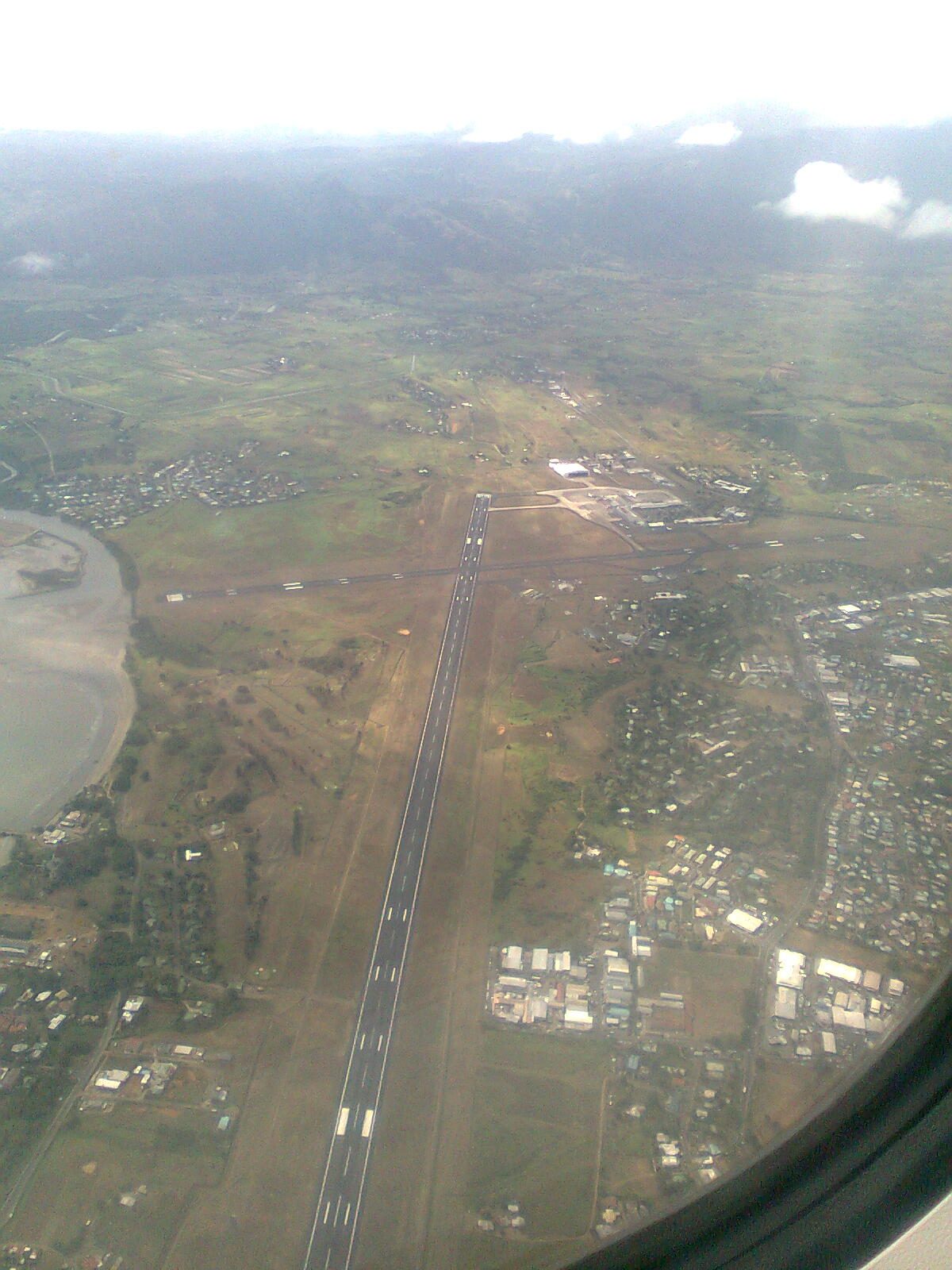
Nadi International Airport, built as Nadi Airfield and Naval Air Facility Nandi. Part of Port of Nadi is seen on the left.

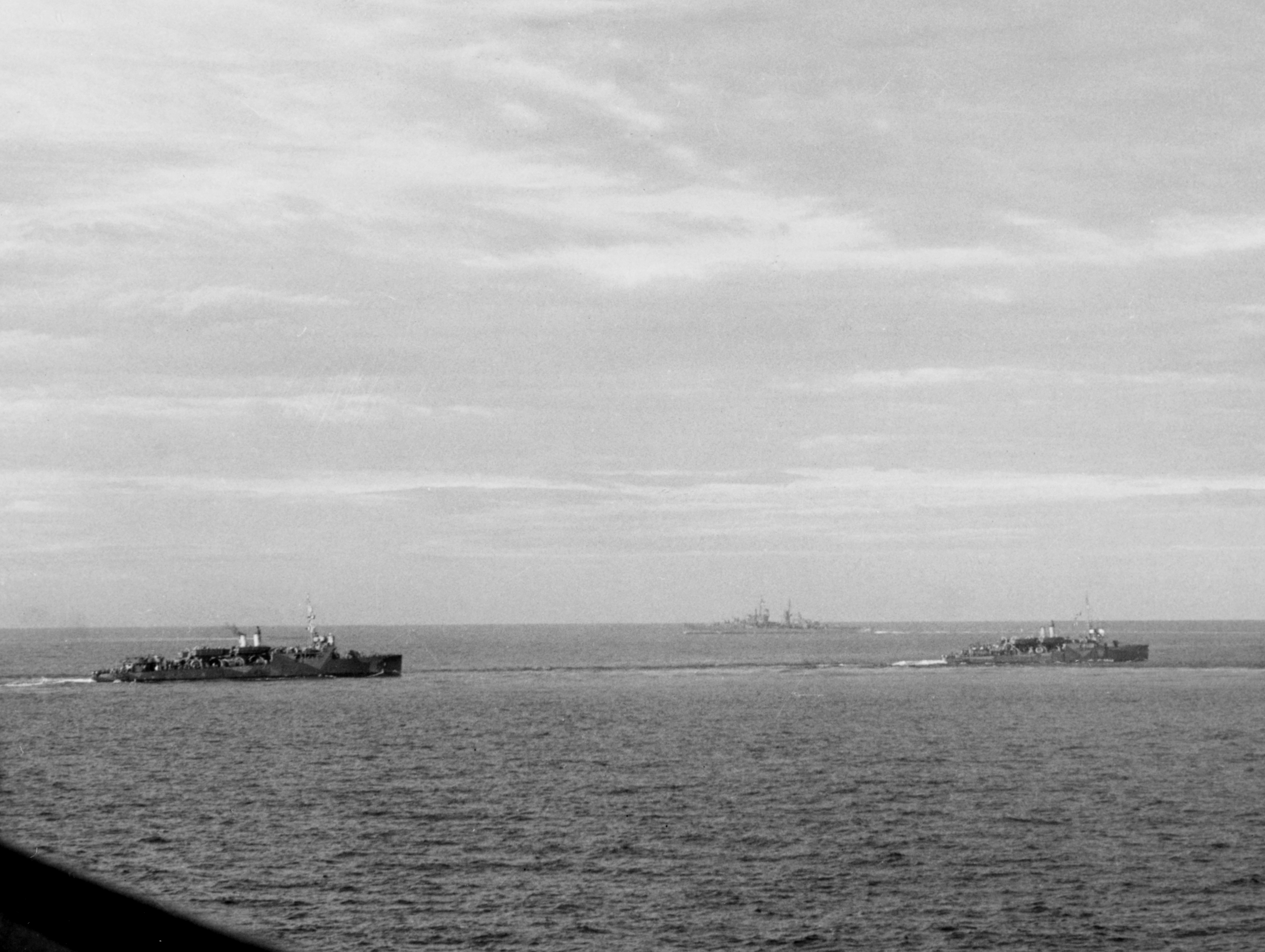
USS Gregory (APD-3) and USS Little (APD-4) underway during practice landings in the Fiji Islands on 30 July 1942

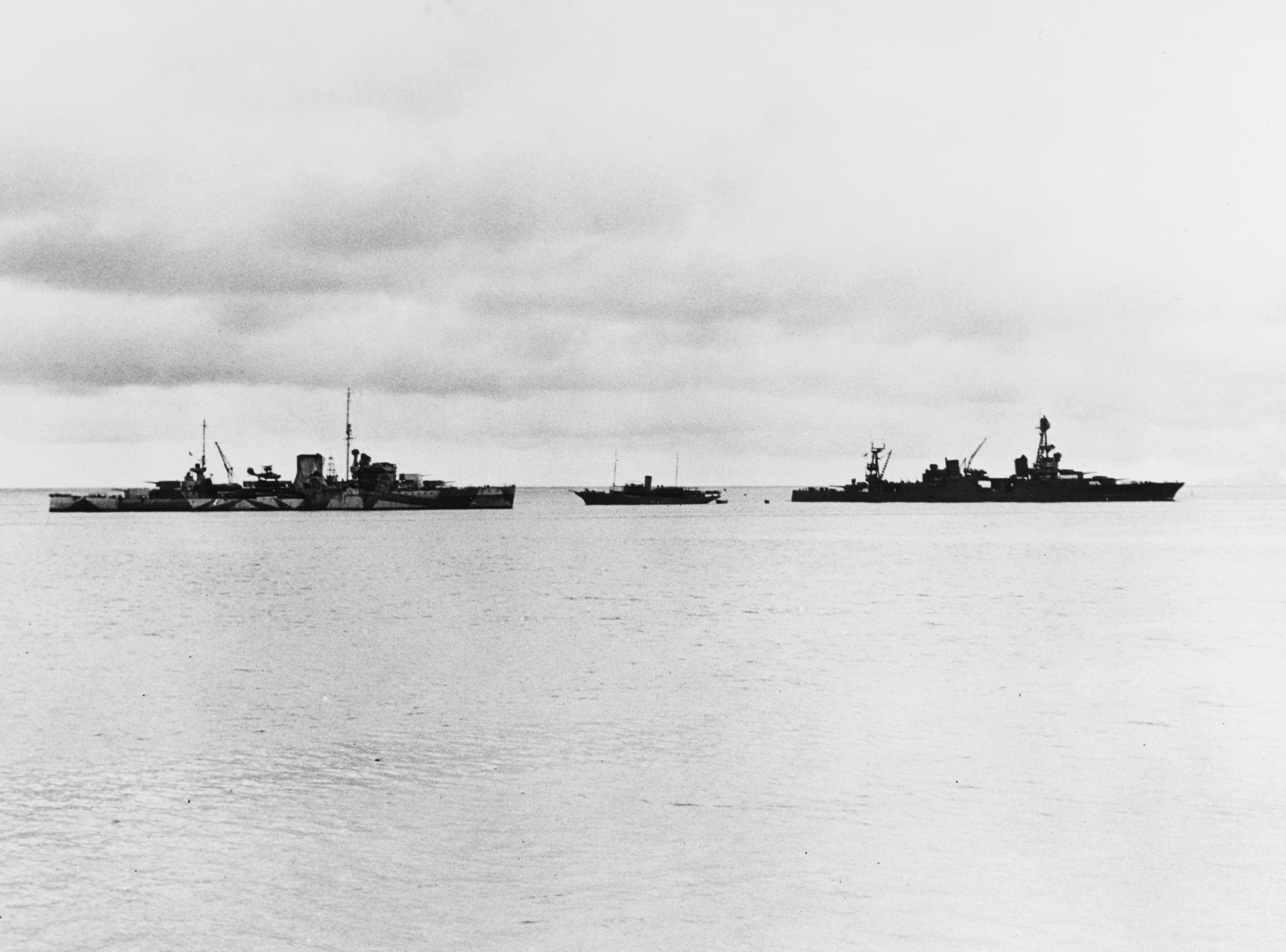
HMNZS Leander, USS Chicago and USS Niagara anchored in Port of Suva in February 1942.jpg

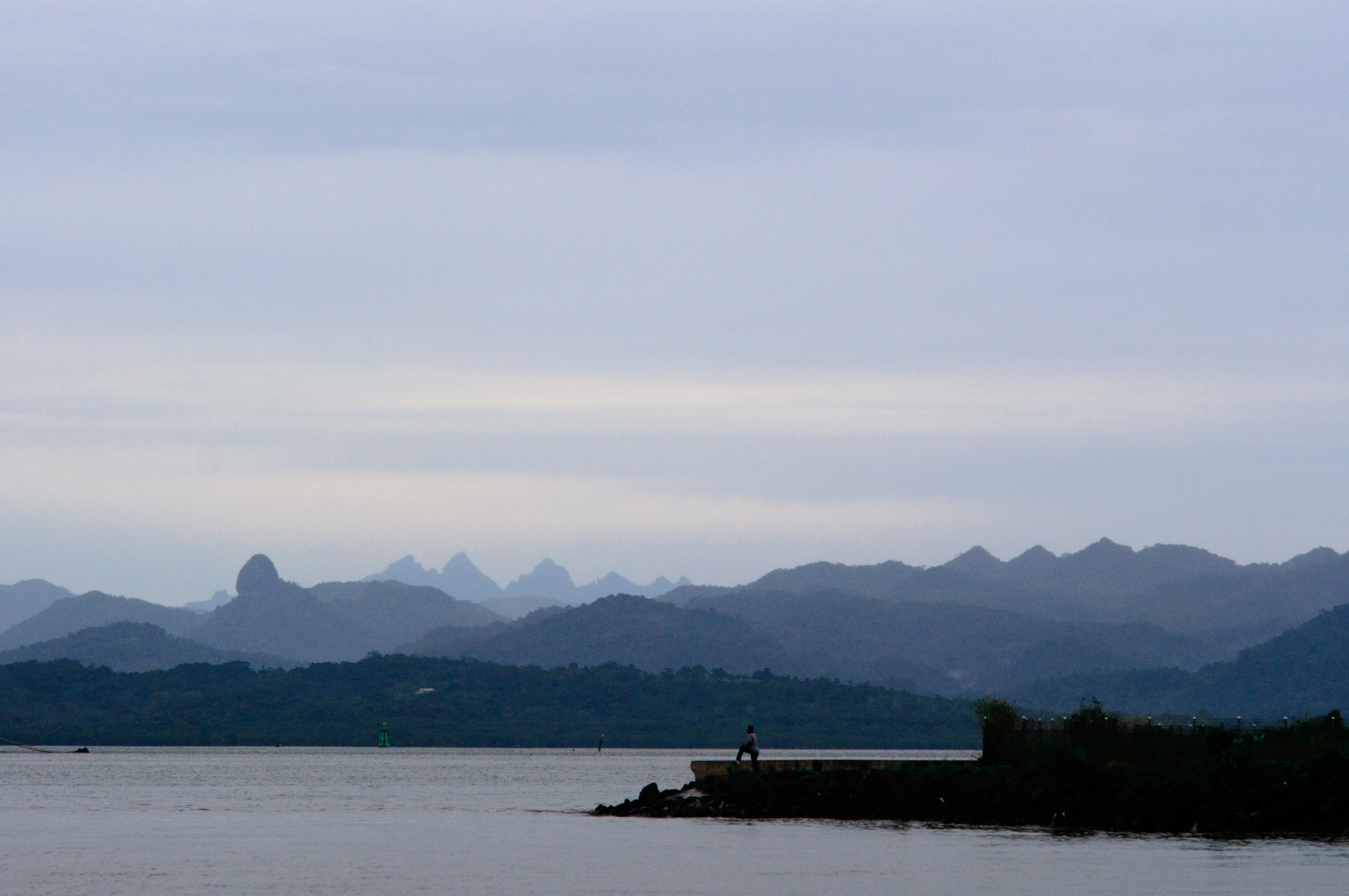
Suva Bay

== See also ==
- Colonial War Memorial Hospital
- US Naval Advance Bases
- Gilbert Islands naval order of battle
- World War II United States Merchant Navy
- History of Fiji
- Fiji Infantry Regiment
- US Naval Base New Zealand
