= USS Leedstown (AP-73) =

American ocean liner, later U.S. Navy amphibious assault ship

Coordinates: 36°49′13″N 3°9′55″E

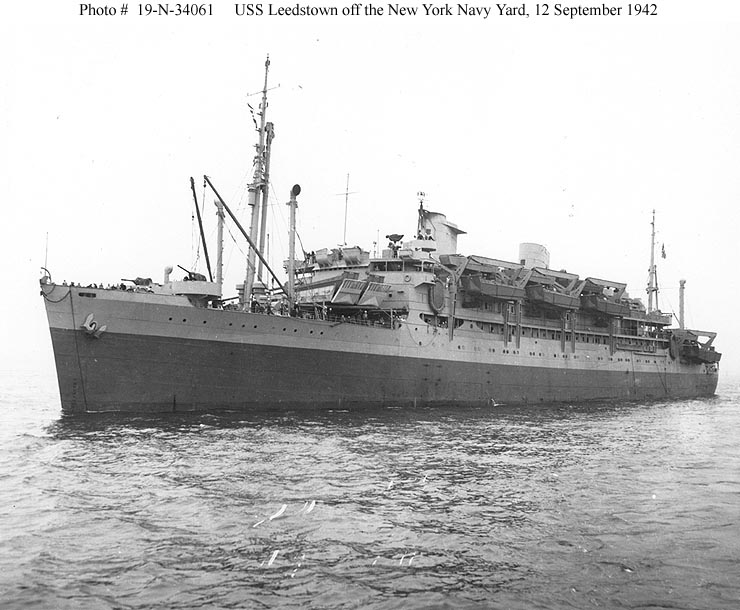

History
- Name: Santa Lucia; Leedstown
- Namesake: Leedstown, Virginia
- Owner: Grace Shipping Company
- Operator: Grace Shipping Company U.S. Navy (under sub-bareboat charter)
- Port of registry: San Francisco
- Route: New York - San Francisco/Seattle via Havana, Panama, Colombia, El Salvador, Guatemala, Mexico & Los Angeles
- Builder: Federal Shipbuilding & Dry Dock Co., Kearny, New Jersey
- Yard number: 123
- Laid down: 28 September 1931
- Launched: 3 October 1932
- Completed: Delivered: 9 February 1933; Acquired by Navy: 6 August 1942
- Commissioned: (Navy) 24 September 1942
- Maiden voyage: 17 February 1933, New York to San Francisco
- Stricken: (Navy) 7 December 1942
- Identification: U.S. Official number: 232101; Signal: WKER
- Fate: Sunk, 9 November 1942

General characteristics
- Tonnage: 9,135 GRT, 3,839 NRT
- Displacement: Commercial 16,500 tons; 8,600 long tons (8,738 t) light; 9,135 long tons (9,282 t) full
- Length: 508 ft (154.8 m) (overall); 484.4 ft (147.6 m) (registry)
- Beam: 72.2 ft (22.0 m)
- Draft: 26 ft 2.5 in (8.0 m)
- Depth: 25.8 ft 11 in (8.1 m) (register); 38 ft 11 in (11.9 m) (molded to B deck)
- Installed power: 4 X Babcock & Wilcox boilers furnishing steam for main engines & auxiliaries. 2 X 500 kw DC generators 1 on each main engine low pressure side, 2 X 500 kw standby generating sets
- Propulsion: 2 X General Electric double reduction gear steam turbines, 6,000 shp normal, 6,600 shp max (propeller speeds 95/98 rpm),
- Speed: 18.5 knots (34.3 km/h; 21.3 mph) (contract); 20.05 knots (37.13 km/h; 23.07 mph) (trial)
- Capacity: Passengers: 225 first, 65 third class; (As troopship) 2,505; Cargo: 250,000 cu ft (7,079.2 m^{3}) (hold); 42,000 cu ft (1,189.3 m^{3}) (refrigerated)
- Crew: 180 (registry, commercial); (Navy) 538

USS Leedstown (AP-73), built as the Grace Line passenger and cargo ocean liner SS Santa Lucia, served as a United States Navy amphibious assault ship in World War II. The ship had first been turned over to the War Shipping Administration (WSA) and operated by Grace Line as the WSA agent from February to August 1942 in the Pacific. In August the ship, at New York, was turned over to the Navy under sub-bareboat charter from WSA. She was sunk 9 November 1942 off the Algerian coast by a German submarine after German bombers caused damage the day before.

Santa Lucia was the third of four sister ships sometimes dubbed "The Four Sisters" or "Big Four" ordered in 1930 by Grace Line for its Panama Mail Service from the Federal Shipbuilding and Drydock Company of Kearny, New Jersey. All four ships were launched in 1932. The other ships in order of launch were Santa Rosa, Santa Paula and, after Santa Lucia, Santa Elena.

== Construction ==
=== Design ===
Grace ordered four new ships to comply with its mail contracts. The design of the four ships was by Gibbs & Cox, Inc., founded by William Francis Gibbs, with consultants for joiner work John Russell Pope and interior design by Dorothy Marckwald who formed the firm Elsie Cobb Wilson. At the time women taking a lead in interior design for ships was "unheard of" and U.S. ship interiors were based on 18th century English styles with many Americans dubious about "modern" styles. (Note: This first women led interior design of the four Grace liners would lead to firms involving Marckwald and Smyth, Urquhart & Marckwald, Inc. selected by the Maritime Commission to plan and supervise interior design of America (1939) in a modern style.)

== Service history ==
=== Grace liner Santa Lucia ===
The ship was registered with U.S. Official Number 232101, signal WKER, at 9,135 GRT, 3,839 NRT, 484.4 ft (147.6 m) registry length, 72.2 ft (22.0 m) beam and 25.8 ft (7.9 m) depth and a registry crew of 180 and having 12,000 horsepower. The ship's owner is listed as Grace Steam Ship Co. of Delaware with home port of San Francisco.

Santa Lucia was delivered to Grace Line on 9 February 1933 for operation in the line's Panama Mail Service. The ship departed New York on 17 February for an ultimate destination of Seattle by way of Havana, Panama, Colombia, El Salvador, Guatemala, Mexico, Los Angeles, San Francisco and Victoria, British Columbia. The ship would return to San Francisco to begin the eastbound voyage and a regular intercoastal schedule. The four new ships would bring an extension of the line's service from San Francisco to include Victoria and Seattle. The service would be based on twice monthly sailings between New York and Seattle with the New York to Seattle voyage lasting 21 days and the Seattle to New York voyage taking 22 days.

San Francisco was the Pacific base for the combined fleets of the Grace Steamship Company with the city being the Pacific home port for the four new Panama Mail ships. The ship was the first of Grace line's new "Big Four" to use the line's new terminal at San Francisco's Pier 35 and was present 19 October 1933 at the terminal's dedication ceremony and luncheon.

In May 1934 Grace Line and Panama Pacific Line announced a new combined service that would bring a fast weekly service between New York and West Coast ports with seven liners, the four new Grace liners along with Panama Pacific's California and Pennsylvania and Virginia. The lines would jointly use New York piers 61 and 62 at the foot of West 22nd Street. Pennsylvania inaugurated the service on 5 May 1934 with Santa Lucia, the first Grace ship on the service, departing on 11 May. Previously the two lines has operated service departing every two weeks with ships at times departing within a day of each other.

The San Francisco-Seattle service had become popular due to the speed and superior accommodations on the Grace liners and other lines complained that the liners were subsidized for foreign trade and should not compete in coastwise trade. Seattle was dropped from the schedule in late 1934 and three of the ships could maintain the New York-San Francisco schedule. In November 1934 Grace Line announced that Santa Lucia would enter the New York to west coast of South America service on her next voyage due to increased traffic on that route. By 1935 the growth of fruit trade from South America had grown so that five Grace Line ships (Note: Santa Barbara, Santa Clara, Santa Inez, Santa Maria and Santa Rita.) on the route were upgrading refrigerated space. Santa Lucia's original refrigerated cargo spaces were used in the trade.

A company brochure for sailings September 1941 to March 1942 issued in September 1941 shows Santa Lucia as one of three ships scheduled to sail from New York with calls at Cristobal and Balboa in Panama, Buenaventura, Colombia, Guayaquil, Ecuador, the Peruvian ports of Talara, Salaverry, Callao and Mollendo and the Chilean ports of Arica, Antofagasta, Chañaral and Valparaíso.

=== War Shipping Administration service ===
Santa Lucia was delivered to the War Shipping Administration (WSA) at New York on 27 February 1942. The ship was operated by Grace Lines as the WSA operating agent making a voyage to Australia starting at New York on 4 March for Army requirements. After stops at Townsville and Brisbane the ship returned to San Francisco on 10 May 1942. On 26 May Santa Lucia made a trip to Fiji before leaving the Pacific for the Atlantic. The ship arrived at the Panama Canal 3 July but made a trip to Buenaventura before transiting the canal and arriving at New York 16 July 1943.

=== Navy service ===
The ship was acquired for the Navy through a sub-bareboat charter from the WSA on 6 August 1942, converted for amphibious assault service and renamed USS Leedstown. She was commissioned in late September 1942 and almost immediately crossed the Atlantic to Belfast, Northern Ireland, where she joined a force preparing for Operation Torch, the invasion of French North Africa.

Early on the evening of 8 November, shortly after putting her troops and some of her cargo ashore east of Algiers, she was attacked by Ju 88 bombers and immobilised by a torpedo in her stern. The next day three bombs only just missed her. On 9 November 1942 the German submarine U-331 hit her with two torpedoes. She sank bow first off the Algerian coast with the loss of eight men out of more than 500 aboard when abandon ship was ordered.
