= Dorothy Marckwald =

Marckwald circa 1941

Dorothy "Dot" Marckwald (1898–1986) was a prominent American interior designer in the mid-20th century who focused primarily on the interiors of luxury ocean liners. Her most important works were the interiors for the SS America and the SS United States, which was the fastest passenger liner of all time. She worked closely with William Francis Gibbs, one of America’s most renowned naval architects, and her own firm Smyth, Urquhart, & Marckwald, the only firm run by women to decorate the interior of such ships. The interiors of the SS United States were especially noteworthy because of the use of entirely flame-retardant materials. In total, Marckwald completed the interiors of thirty-one ships, and revolutionized luxury ocean liner design along the way.

== Beginnings ==
Dorothy Marckwald graduated from the Packer Collegiate Institute in Brooklyn, New York in 1916. After graduating from the Packer Institute, she studied Interior Design at the New York School of Fine and Applied Arts, now known as the Parsons School of Design. Marckwald’s career began in 1920 when she was hired by Elsie Cobb Wilson, an extremely influential interior designer of the early 20th century, as an assistant designer for her firm. She started out by designing high-end homes, hotels, country clubs, offices, ranches and yachts in Washington D.C. and New York City. In 1930, Marckwald was assigned to head the interior decoration of the Grace Line’s four new 9,000-ton intercoastal ocean liners, the Santa Elena, Santa Lucia, Santa Paula, and Santa Rosa, which proved to be a turning point in her career. Together with Anne Urquhart and William Francis Gibbs, whom Marckwald grants her success to and considers a mentor, she completed the luxurious country club-styled interiors of the four ships to much praise. This popularity led Wilson to add Marckwald and Urquhart as full-fledged partners in 1933, changing the firm name to Elsie Cobb Wilson and Company. With Wilson’s retirement in 1937 and the addition of former colleague Miriam Smyth, the firm of Smyth, Urquhart & Marckwald was formed.

== SS America ==
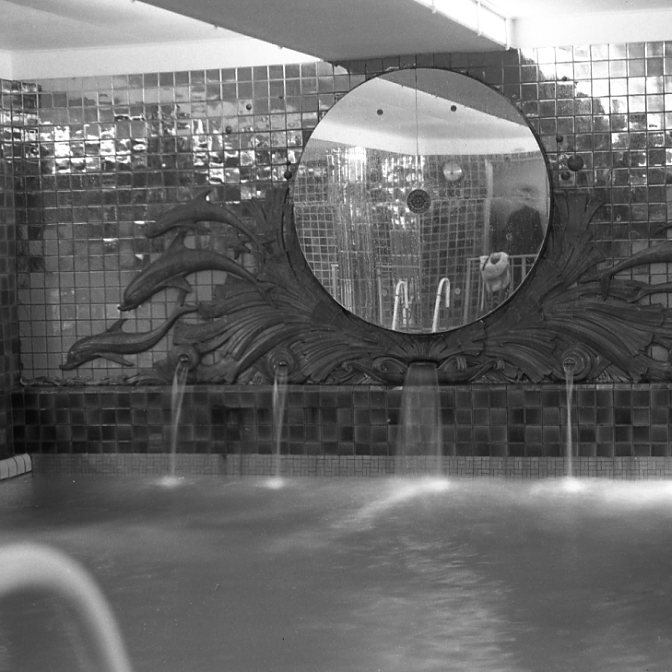
SS America swimming pool

In 1938, Gibbs enlisted the women to design the interiors of the SS America, a new commission for the United States Lines and one of the biggest in shipbuilding history. The design involved 23 public rooms, 395 state rooms, and eight luxury suites. According to many ship lovers of the time, it was also the most beautifully decorated liner to fly the American flag. Marckwald chose to forego the traditional Southwest style of current passenger ships in favor of a modernist look ideal for the future, utilizing light color schemes and new materials such as Lucite and aluminum. The new style was revolutionary and became the new standard of American ocean liner design, garnering the nickname “Dot Marckwald modern.”

== SS United States ==
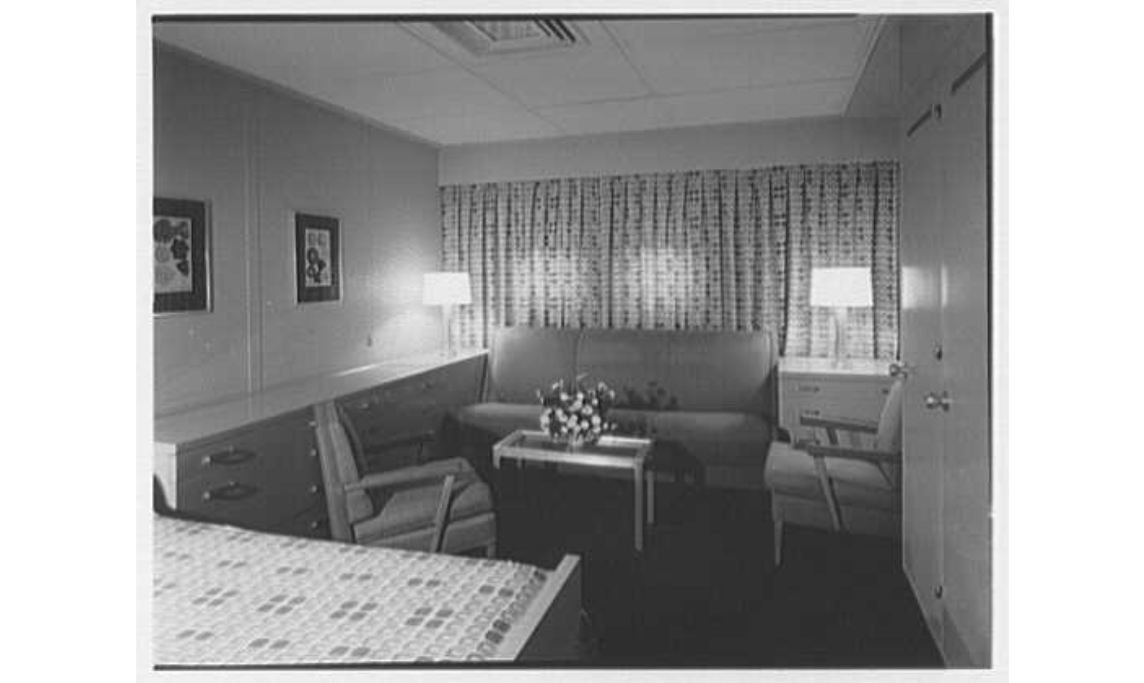
First-class stateroom aboard the SS United States

Marckwald had one of the highest honors of being chosen to design the interiors of the SS United States. Designed by William Francis Gibbs and completed in 1952, it was the fastest and largest passenger ship ever built at the time. The main purpose of the ship was to transport large numbers of soldiers across seas as quickly as possible, and it achieved this goal due in part to the extensive use of aluminum in its construction, which is lighter than more commonly used wood. No wood was used in the framing, accessories, decorations or interior surfaces of the ship in order to deter the possibility of fire. Marckwald and Urquhart faced several challenges when designing the interior of the ship, including working around obstacles that come with a ship moving at speeds that had not yet been developed and coming up with a design that was lightweight and entirely fireproof. This led to the use of innovative materials such as aluminum, fiberglass, and Dynel throughout the ships’ 26 public rooms, 674 state rooms, and 20 luxury suites. The color schemes were chosen to limit seasickness and remind the passengers that they were setting to sea, furniture was designed to fit specifically to its assigned location, and decorative artwork was intended to emphasize America. After three years’ work and despite the challenges, the ship’s finished interior was fresh, modern, and, ultimately, safe.

The SS United States was a prestigious way to travel between America and Europe. Some of its famous passengers included John F. Kennedy, Walt Disney, Salvador Dalí, and Marilyn Monroe. It is also famed for transporting the Mona Lisa to France after it was on display in the National Gallery of Art in Washington D.C. and the Metropolitan Museum of Art in New York City. While it is no longer active, the SS United States Conservancy has saved the ship from being scrapped and is determined to restore it to its full luxury standard; however, with budget troubles in the way, the future of the ship is currently unclear. Ideas for repurposing the ships’ 600,000 square feet include luxury condos, a mixed-use space consisting of a hotel, shops, and restaurants, or a hub for tech companies to house their businesses.

== Other works ==
Between and after working on the SS America and SS United States, Marckwald found the time to work on a few other projects, such as decorating a railroad car for the Santa Fe railroad in 1949, renovating the home of the Duke and Duchess of Windsor in the Bahamas, and designing two new ships for the Grace Line in 1955:

- The Santa Paula, which later became Kuwait Marriott Hotel and was landlocked in a specially made berth raised out of the harbor bed.
- The Santa Rosa, which later became the SS Emerald.
