= DE26 =

DE26 may refer to:

- Delaware Route 26
- ROCS Tai Chao (DE-26)
- USS Dempsey (DE-26)
