= HMS Lossie =

River-class frigate of the Royal Navy

History

United Kingdom
- Namesake: River Lossie
- Builder: Canadian Vickers, Montreal
- Laid down: 2 October 1942
- Launched: 30 April 1943
- Commissioned: 14 August 1943
- Decommissioned: 26 January 1946
- Notes: Ordered by United States Navy as PG-108. Transferred to RN before completion under the lend-lease program. Returned to the USN on 26 January 1946.

General characteristics
- Class & type: River-class frigate
- Displacement: 1,370 long tons (1,390 t); 1,830 long tons (1,860 t) (deep load)
- Length: 283 ft (86.26 m) p/p; 301.25 ft (91.82 m)o/a
- Beam: 36.5 ft (11.13 m)
- Draught: 9 ft (2.74 m); 13 ft (3.96 m) (deep load)
- Propulsion: 2 x Admiralty 3-drum boilers, 2 shafts, reciprocating vertical triple expansion, 5,500 ihp
- Speed: 20 knots (37.0 km/h)
- Range: 646 long tons (656 t) oil fuel; 7,500 nautical miles (13,890 km) at 15 knots (27.8 km/h)
- Complement: 140
- Armament: 2 × QF 4 in (102 mm) /40 Mk.XIX, single mounts CP Mk.XXIII; up to 10 x QF 20 mm Oerlikon A/A on twin mounts Mk.V and single mounts Mk.III; 1 × Hedgehog 24 spigot A/S projector; up to 150 depth charges

HMS Lossie was a River-class frigate that served in the Royal Navy from 1943 to 1946.

== Construction ==
Lossie was ordered by the United States Navy as PG-103 and was built to the RN's specifications as a Group II River-class frigate. She was laid down at Canadian Vickers Ltd., Montreal on 2 October 1942 and launched on 30 April 1943. She was transferred on 12 August 1943 while still under construction from the USN to the RN under the auspices of the lend-lease program.

She was commissioned 2 days later into the RN as HMS Lossie and was named after the River Lossie in Moray, Scotland which flows into the Moray Firth at Lossiemouth.

== War service ==
Lossie saw extensive service on North Atlantic convoy escort missions and also saw service in the Indian Ocean.

It was during a patrol mission in the Indian Ocean that the freighter Nellore was sunk on 29 June 1944. Lossie picked up 112 crew from the Nellore the following week near the Chagos Archipelago and landed them at Addu Atoll.

Convoy escorts
Convoy code	Route	Convoy departure	Began escort duty	Ceased escort duty	Convoy arrival
SC 148	Halifax, Nova Scotia to Liverpool, England	1943-12-02	1943-12-06	1943-12-15	1943-12-16
HX 276	New York City, USA to Liverpool	1944-01-22	1944-02-03	1944-02-05	1944-02-07
ON 223	Liverpool to New York City	1944-02-07	1944-02-10	1944-02-11	1944-02-24
HX 278	New York City to Liverpool	1944-02-05	1944-02-16	1944-02-17	1944-02-20
ONS 029	Liverpool to Halifax	1944-02-12	1944-02-17	1944-02-19	1944-02-29
ON 224	Liverpool to New York City	1944-02-14	1944-02-17	1944-02-18	1944-03-02
KMF 029A	Clyde, Scotland to Alexandria, Egypt	1944-03-03	1944-03-03	1944-03-17	1944-03-17
AJ 002/2	Aden to Colombo, Ceylon	1944-03-28	1944-03-28	1944-04-04	1944-04-04
CJ 023B	Calcutta, India to Colombo	16/04/ 1944	1944-04-16	1944-04-18	1944-04-18
CX 024	Chagos Archipelago to Maldives to Colombo	1944-07-20	1944-07-20	1944-07-22	1944-07-22
KR 016/1	Calcutta to Rangoon, Burma	1945-07-09	1945-07-09	1945-07-11	1945-07-11

== Post-war use ==
Lossie was decommissioned and stricken from the RN on 26 January 1946 and was returned to the USN at Boston, Massachusetts two days later as PG-103.

The USN sold her on 13 November 1946 to Cadio Compania de Navegacio S.A. of Panama and she was registered as Teti. She was sold in 1955 to Typaldos Brothers 88 Co. Ltd. of Piraeus, Greece and was registered as Adriatiki. She was wrecked in the Aegean Sea on 16 January 1968.

== Sources ==
- Campbell, N. J. M. (1980). "Great Britain (including Empire Forces)". In Chesneau, Roger (ed.). Conway's All the World's Fighting Ships 1922–1946. Greenwich, UK: Conway Maritime Press. pp. 2–85. ISBN 0-85177-146-7.
