= SS Taroona =

Steam turbine ship launched in 1934

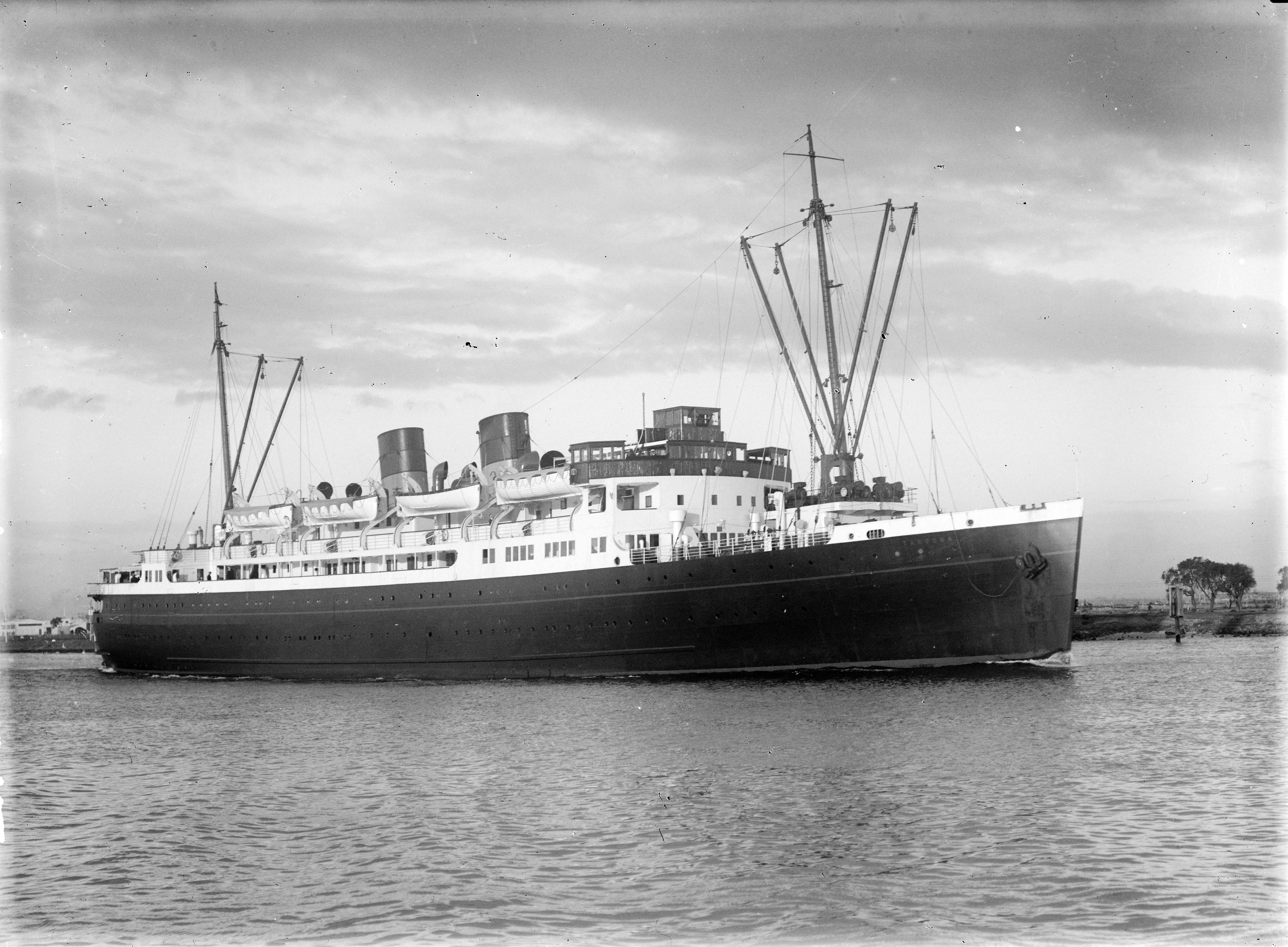
- Taroona circa 1951

History

Australia
- Name: Taroona
- Namesake: Taroona, Tasmania
- Owner: Tasmanian Steamers
- Builder: Alexander Stephen & Sons, Glasgow
- Yard number: 543
- Launched: 22 November 1934
- Completed: January 1935
- Out of service: 1959

Greece
- Name: Hellas
- Namesake: Hellas (Greece)
- Owner: Typaldos Lines
- Port of registry: Piraeus
- Acquired: 1959
- Identification: IMO number: 5147011
- Fate: Scrapped at Aliağa in 1989.

General characteristics
- Tonnage: 4325 grt
- Length: 108.08 m (354 ft 7 in)
- Beam: 15.27 m (50 ft 1 in)
- Draught: 4.60 m (15 ft 1 in)
- Propulsion: 6 steam turbines single reduction geared to 2 screw shafts of 6000 shp, 3 water tube boilers fitted to burn oil
- Speed: 16 kn (30 km/h; 18 mph), top speed of 18 kn (33 km/h; 21 mph)

SS Taroona was built in Linthouse, Glasgow by Alexander Stephen & Sons for Tasmanian Steamers, Australia. She was a steam turbine ship capable of 18 knots (33 km/h; 21 mph), but typically operated at 16 knots (30 km/h; 18 mph) for better fuel economy.

== Service in Australia and New Zealand ==
Taroona entered service in 1935 serving on the Bass Strait route from Melbourne to Bell Bay and Beauty Point from Melbourne to Devonport and Burnie. Taroona was requisitioned for service as a troopship in World War II by the Government of New Zealand. She carried troops from Auckland to Suva's Naval Base Fiji in January 1942, and in March 1942. On her return to the Bass Strait run she was almost immediately again requisitioned this time by the Government of Australia again as a troopship. During her first trip to Naval Base Port Moresby at Port Moresby she carried 480 troops and supplies; on leaving Port Moresby she ran aground on a reef at the entrance where she remained for three days, helpless hard and fast aground. All attempts to refloat her using both engines and the assistance of navy vessels proved useless. The situation became serious when on several occasions Japanese bombers swept in to attack the Seven Mile Aerodrome outside Port Moresby. Why they failed to attack Taroona remains a mystery. Finally aided by three naval vessels, she shook herself free.

In her war time career she travelled 329,167 kilometres (204,535 mi) and carried 93,432 troops. Although frequently under fire during her ninety-four trips she remained unscathed.

Taroona arrived in Sydney on 4 February 1946, ending her career as an Australian troop carrier. She was handed back to Tasmanian Steamers and joined SS Nairana which had maintained a very busy schedule during Taroona’s absence including transporting troops from Tasmania to Melbourne.

In 1959, Taroona was replaced by the Princess of Tasmania, a ship more suitable for the times as motor cars were becoming very popular and Taroona could only take 30 which had to be winched aboard.

== Service in Greece ==
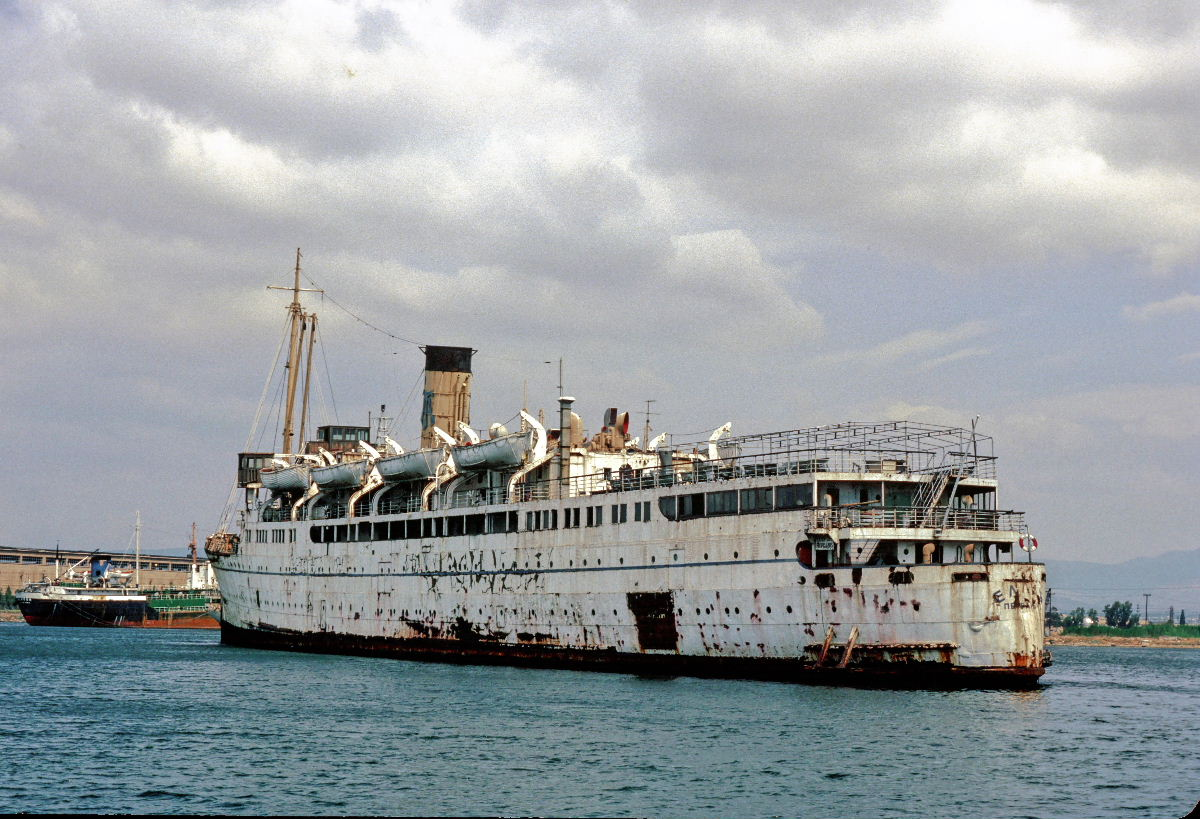
Hellas laid up in Elefsina, July 1986

Taroona was sold to Typaldos Lines, renamed Hellas and immediately taken over by her new crew and departed Australia for Greece. She was converted to a cruise ship and operated cruises around the Mediterranean Sea until 1966. On a notable journey on 7 February 1964, former Greek Prime Minister Sofoklis Venizelos died on board the ship of a pulmonary edema, en route from Chania to Piraeus, at age 69.

In 1966 she was laid up in Perama bay for the winter but never worked again after the SS Heraklion sank with great loss of life and the Typaldos Lines was found guilty of negligence. Subsequently, all their ships were sold except Hellas and SS Athinai. Hellas remained laid-up at Elefsina bay until May 1989 when she was towed out of the bay to Aliağa in Turkey and scrapped.

== General references ==
- Plowman, Peter (2004). Ferry to Tasmania, A Short History. Rosenberg Publishing. ISBN 1-877058-27-0.
- Hopkins, David (1994). Bass Strait Crossings, The Shipping History of the. Taswegia. ISBN 0-646-18635-3.
- Fitchett, Thomas (1976). The Vanished Fleet. Rigby. ISBN 0-7270-0210-4.
