= Typaldos Lines =

- Industry: Shipping
- Founded: c. 1949
- Defunct: 1968
- Headquarters: Hellenio House, 12 Old Bond Street, London, W1X 4BL, United Kingdom
- Number of locations: Piraeus, Greece
- Area served: international
- Total equity: Private Limited with share capital
- Owner: Haralambos Typaldos

Typaldos Lines, formally known as the Aegean Steam Navigation Company, was a privately held Greek shipping company based in the Port of Piraeus, Greece. In 1956 the company had registered its headquarters in London, UK. after operating earlier as Typaldos Brothers Steamship Co. Ltd. The company purchased retired ships and refitted the vessels for passenger cruises and ferry services in the Mediterranean and Greek islands. In 1966 the ferry SS Heraklion sank in the Aegean Sea and over 200 passengers and crew members perished. In 1968 the Greek government investigation of the Heraklion incident found the ship's owners guilty of manslaughter, negligence, and document falsification. Furthermore, twelve of the company's fifteen ships had failed inspection. Haralambos Typaldos (company owner) and Panayiotis Kokkinos (general manager) were sentenced to jail. The company was dissolved that year when their ships were taken over or sold.

== Lawsuit ==
The Typaldos Lines name endures in legal contract law stemming from the lawsuit Anglo Continental Holidays Ltd v Typaldos Lines (London) Ltd.

In that case a trip was advertised for the Atlantica (with two swimming pools and spacious accommodation) but the line substituted the much smaller Angelika. Typaldos Lines also shortened a two-day call at Haifa, Israel to just eight hours. The line referred to a clause in the passenger contract that indicated, "..steamers, sailing, rates and itineraries are subject to change without prior notice." The court ruled that the substitution was a radical departure from the performance of the contract and granted monetary damages to the plaintiffs. Lord Denning said: "In my opinion a steamship company cannot rely on a clause of this kind so as to alter the substance of the transaction..." The case is still cited in legal opinions regarding injury to commercial reputation.

== Vessels ==
Vessels of the Typaldos Lines:

- Adonis (later K Lines Atlantis)
- Adriatiki (ex-Royal navy frigate HMS Lossie (K303))
- Aegaeon (ex-Canadian Pacific Railway Princess Alice)
- Akropolis (ex-Grace Line Santa Paula)
- Angelika (ex-Canadian Pacific Railway Princess Adelaide)
- Athinai (ex-Grace Line Santa Rosa)
- Atlantica (ex-French Line Colombie)
- Elektra (ex- Soc. Général de Transportes Maritimes à Vapeur Sidi-Okba, later Italmar Princess Sissy)
- Elli (ex- Stamura, ex- Elsi, ex-Elli Toyas)
- Eros (later MTS Stella Oceanis, Jason, Iason)
- Hania (ex-Bibby Line Warwickshire)
- Hellas (ex-Tasmanian Steamers Taroona)
- Heraklion (ex-Bibby Line Leicestershire)
- Ionion (ex-Société Nationale de Chemins de Fer Français Londres)
- Kriti (ex-Associated Humber Lines Melrose Abbey)
- Lemnos (ex-Royal navy corvette HMCS Lindsay, ex-Clarke Steamship North Shore (2))
- Mediterranean (ex-Canadian Pacific Railway Princess Charlotte)
- Atlantic (ex-Khedivial Mail Steamship & Graving Dock Company Famaka)
- Mount Olympos (ex-French Line Ville D'Oran)
- Mykonos (ex-US Navy seaplane tender USS Shelikof (AVP-52)
- Rodos (ex-US Navy seaplane tender USS Timbalier (AVP-54)
