= SS Santa Rosa (1932) =

American ocean liner built in 1932

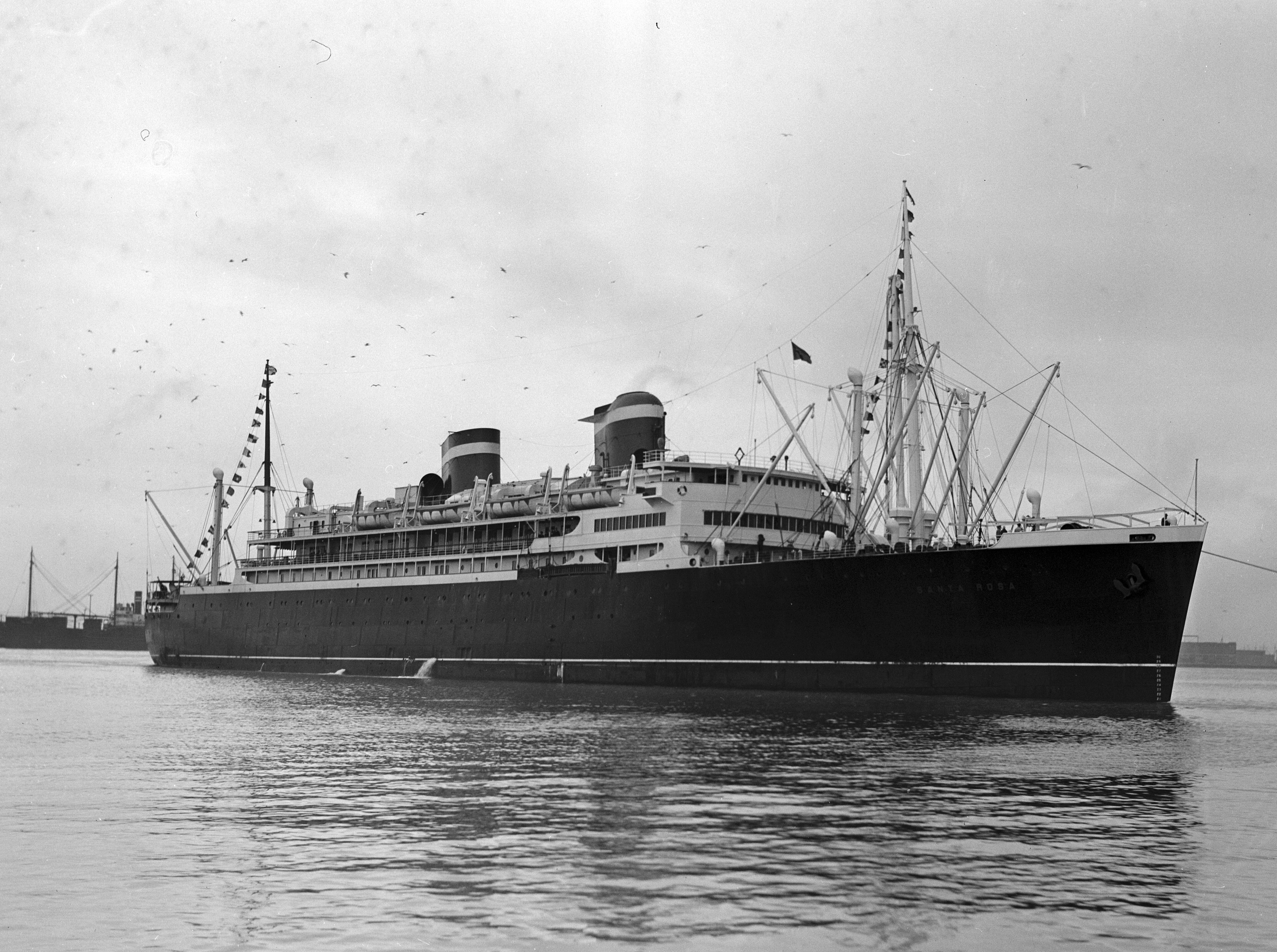
- SS Santa Rosa in Grace Line livery, 1932

History
- Name: SS Santa Rosa
- Operator: Grace Line (1932–41, 1947–58)
- Port of registry: San Francisco, California
- Route: New York - Havana - Cristobal - the Panama Canal - Balboa - Puntarenas - La Libertad - San Jose de Guatemala - Mazatlan - Los Angeles - San Francisco - Victoria - Seattle.
- Ordered: 1930
- Builder: Federal Shipbuilding and Drydock Company
- Yard number: 121
- Laid down: 22 June 1931
- Launched: 24 March 1932
- Completed: Delivered: 27 October 1932
- Maiden voyage: 26 November 1932
- Out of service: 1958
- Identification: Official number: 231932; Call letters: WMDA
- Fate: Sold in 1961
- Name: Santa Rosa
- Operator: War Shipping Administration (1942–47)
- Port of registry: New York
- Name: SS Athinai
- Operator: Aegean Steam Navigation Co (Typaldos Line)
- Acquired: 1961
- In service: 1961
- Out of service: 1966
- Home port: Piraeus, Greece
- Identification: IMO number: 5028631
- Fate: Scrapped 1989, Aliaga, Izmir-Turkey

General characteristics
- Tonnage: 9,135 GRT, 3,839 NRT
- Displacement: Commercial 16,500 tons
- Length: 508 ft (154.8 m) (overall); 484.4 ft (147.6 m) (registry)
- Beam: 72.2 ft (22.0 m)
- Draft: 26 ft 2.5 in (8.0 m)
- Depth: 25.8 ft 11 in (8.1 m) (register); 38 ft 11 in (11.9 m) (molded to B deck)
- Installed power: 4 × Babcock & Wilcox boilers furnishing steam for main engines & auxiliaries. 2 × 500 kw DC generators 1 on each main engine low pressure side, 2 × 500 kw standby generating sets
- Propulsion: 2 × General Electric double reduction gear steam turbines, 6,000 shp normal, 6,600 shp max (propeller speeds 95/98 rpm),
- Speed: 18.5 knots (34.3 km/h; 21.3 mph) (contract); 20.05 knots (37.13 km/h; 23.07 mph) (trial)
- Capacity: Passengers: 225 first, 65 third class; (As troopship) 2,426; Cargo: 250,000 cu ft (7,079.2 m^{3}) (hold); 42,000 cu ft (1,189.3 m^{3}) (refrigerated)
- Crew: 180 (registry, commercial)
- Notes: sister ships: Santa Elena, Santa Lucia, Santa Paula

SS Santa Rosa (later SS Athinai) was a passenger and cargo ocean liner built for the Grace Line for operation by its subsidiary Panama Mail Steamship Company of San Francisco. She was the first to be launched and operating of four sister ships, the others in order of launch being Santa Paula (11 June 1932), Santa Lucia (3 October 1932) and Santa Elena (30 November 1932). All four ships, dubbed "The Four Sisters" and "The Big Four" were noted as the finest serving the West Coast and were of advanced technology. In 1932, the Santa Rosa was considered most economical steamer ship in use, in terms of its specific fuel consumption. All served in World War II as War Shipping Administration (WSA) troop ships. Both Santa Lucia and Santa Elena were lost in air and torpedo attacks off North Africa.

The ship was ordered in 1930 from the Federal Shipbuilding and Drydock Company of Kearny, New Jersey. Her regular route included inter-coastal service between the east coast and the west coast of the US via the Caribbean and the Panama Canal. She was the second of ultimately three vessels to bear the name Santa Rosa for the Grace Line. (The first Santa Rosa was a 1917-built ship that was sold in 1925.)

== Design and construction ==
Grace ordered four new ships to comply with its mail contracts. The design of the four ships was by Gibbs & Cox, Inc., founded by William Francis Gibbs, with consultants for joiner work John Russell Pope and interior design by Elsie Cobb Wilson Inc., which would later become Elsie Cobb Wilson and Company. At the time women taking a lead in interior design for ships was "unheard of" and U.S. ship interiors were based on 18th century English styles with many Americans dubious about "modern" styles. (Note: This first women led interior design of the four Grace liners would lead to firms involving Marckwald and Smyth, Urquhart & Marckwald, Inc. selected by the Maritime Commission to plan and supervise interior design of America (1939) in a modern style.)

Santa Rosa bore some resemblance to later ships designed by Gibbs & Cox, the SS America and SS United States such as the signature winged funnel. The public rooms were all on the promenade deck. The dining room was located on this deck between the two funnels and had an atrium stretching up two and a half decks. Unique for its day was a retractable roof which allowed the passenger to dine under the tropical sky. The Grace Line also employed female waitresses instead of male stewards. All first class cabins were outside twin beds and private baths.

The ship's keel was laid with yard number 121 on 22 June 1931. Launch was on 24 March 1932 and delivery to Grace Line's subsidiary Panama Mail Steamship Company on 27 October 1932. Santa Rosa was registered with official number 231932 and call letters WMDA at 11,200 GRT, (Note: 1933 registry gross tonnage differs from that given in Troopships of World War II which states gross tonnage at 9,135. That lesser gross tonnage more closely matches registry information for sister ship Santa Paula and could be a mistake or result of recalculation of GRT after troopship conversion.) 484 ft 4 in (147.6 m) registered length with home port of San Francisco.

== Prewar Grace Line service ==
The Santa Rosa sailed on her maiden voyage on 26 November 1932. Her East-West coast route of New York-Seattle was 20 days and included a one-day call in Los Angeles and two days in San Francisco. The ship's service speed of 20 knots and her superior accommodation made her very popular compared to that offered by Pacific Coast shipping. In 1936 however the intercoastal service ended and Santa Rosa and her sisters transferred to service to the Caribbean.

== World War II service ==
Santa Rosa was requisitioned by the US War Shipping Administration on 3 January 1942 with Grace Line operating the ship as agents and allocated to Army for troop service. Santa Rosa had a capacity of 2,426 troops. Even in wartime gray, the ship retained her elegant oceanliner lines:

...Further down and across the dock, the Grace Line passenger ship SS Santa Rosa, also lay waiting. She was painted wartime gray but she still flaunted her nubile twin funnels, sweeping bow and long, beautiful lines; She exuded an aura of speed, luxury, and moonlight tropical nights. The SS Santa Rosa was sexier than Rita Hayworth in a travel poster...

Santa Rosa made 21 voyages from the east coast of the US from 1942-1945: one to Europe, one to Australia, one to India, and three to Africa.

Her wartime voyages included:

- January 1942 – New York to Melbourne and Nouméa via the Panama Canal
- April 1942 – Suez, Massaua, Adan, Durban
- November 1942 – to the Clyde
- November 1942 – to Casablanca
- January 1943 – to Casablanca
- February 1943 – Bermuda and Casablanca
- April 1943 – Casablanca, Gibraltar, the Clyde, Algiers, and Phillippeville
- August 1943 – Oran in Algeria
- October 1943 – Boston, meeting up with Fast Convoy UT-3 out of New York, then onto Swansea, the Clyde, Palermo, Newport UK
- December 1943 – via Boston to Bristol and Newport
- February 1944 – Belfast
- March 1944 – from Boston to Avonmouth and Cardiff
- May 1944 – via Norfolk to Naples and Gibraltar
- July 1944 – via Norfolk to Oran, Naples, and Cape Henry
- August 1944 – Assigned to Task Force 85.3.2, Transport Group, Section II for Operation Dragoon, the 15 August 1944 invasion of southern France. (Note: Another WSA troop transport, Marine Robin was in this group.)
- October 1944 – Marseilles, Oran, and Gibraltar
- December 1944 – from Boston to Swansea and return to Boston
- January 1945 – Le Havre and Southampton
- February 1945 – to La Harve and Plymouth
- March 1945 – to The Solent, Le Havre, Southampton
- June 1945 – Southampton
- July 1945 – Le Havre and Cherbourg with return to Hampton Roads, to Plymouth and Le Havre
- August 1945 – Le Havre and Cherbourg with return to Hampton Roads, to Plymouth and Le Havre
- September 1945 – Marseilles
- October 1945 – from New York via Port Said to Karachi
- December 1945 – from New York via Port Said to Karachi with return to New York in January 1946

The vessel was returned to Grace Line on 3 February 1947. Two sisters, Santa Lucia and Santa Elena, were lost during war service. Santa Lucia was under sub-bareboat charter from WSA by the U.S. Navy operating as USS Leedstown east of Algiers when attacked by German aircraft on 8 November 1942. Immobolized, the ship was torpedoed by German submarine U-331 and sunk 9 November. Santa Elena was torpedoed and sunk on 6 November 1943 off Skikda, Algeria.

== Postwar Grace Line service ==
After her war service she underwent repair and refit at the Newport News Shipbuilding & Drydock Company prior to redelivery to her owners. Santa Rosa returned to Grace Line and resumed the Caribbean service on 7 February 1947. In 1958, after 26 years of service, Santa Rosa was replaced by a larger liner of the same name. The older ship was laid up at Hoboken, NJ until 1961 when both she and her sister ship Santa Paula were sold to Greek interests.

== Typaldos Lines service ==
Santa Rosa was renamed Athinai and began a new career as a cruise ship for Typaldos Lines. A refit increased her accommodation and converted her to carry three classes of passengers. She entered service for her new owners for voyages in the Mediterranean, Black Sea and Adriatic. Athinai in her Typaldos Line livery briefly appears in a scene of the port of Piraeus, Greece, in the 1963 film The Bullfighter Advances. In 1968 the Typaldos Lines owners were arrested and the company dissolved after the Greek government investigation of the SS Heraklion disaster found them guilty of manslaughter and negligence. The company's ships were taken over and sold except for two, including SS Athinai (the other being SS Hellas), having attracted no buyers and were subsequently laid up in initially at Kynosoura and later Eleusis Bay, West of Athens.

== Final Years ==
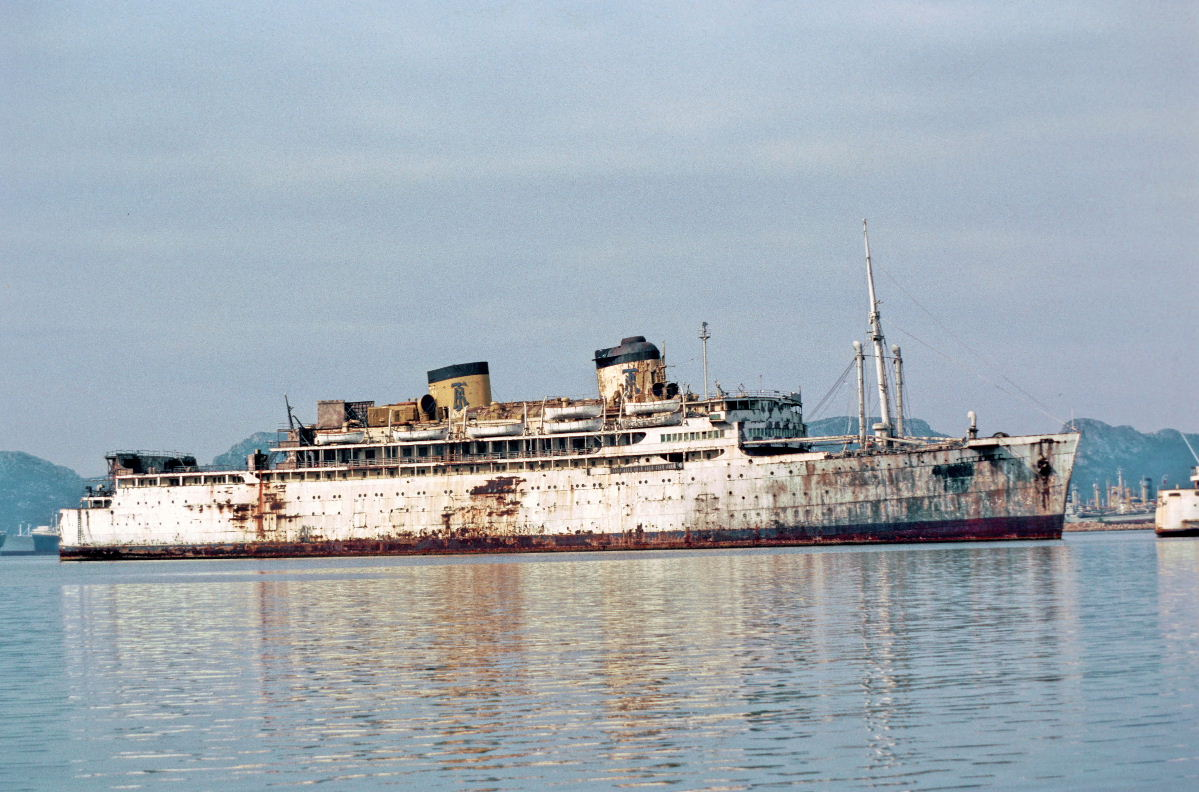
Athinai laid up in Eleusis, July 16, 1986

Athinai never returned to active service.

=== Floating set for Raise the Titanic ===
In 1978, the ship saw one last use, being towed out of layup for use as a filming set for Raise the Titanic. After a decade of neglect, and with fittings that did not appear to be out of place on a 1912 built ship, very little work was needed to make Athinai resemble a ship that had been at the bottom of the ocean for 68 years, both inside and out. The ship's interior spaces "portrayed" the interiors of the RMS Titanic in the final film. Her bow was painted to resemble Titanic's livery and sprayed with green foam to simulate 68 years of decay. After filming was completed, she was returned to her original position at Eleusis Bay.

=== Scrapping ===
The ship continued to deteriorate for another decade until 1989, when she was finally towed for scrapping at Aliağa, Turkey as part of a larger purge of derelict shipping tonnage.
