= SS Heraklion =

Greek car ferry which sank in the Aegean Sea in 1966

- SS Heraklion

History

Greece
- Operator: Aegean Steam Navigation Co.
- Builder: Fairfield Shipbuilding and Engineering Company
- Launched: 29 June 1949
- In service: 1949
- Out of service: 8 December 1966
- Reclassified: 1964
- Home port: Piraeus, Greece
- Fate: Capsized and sank 8 December 1966

General characteristics
- Type: Roll-on/roll-off ship
- Displacement: 8,922 t (8,781 long tons; 9,835 short tons)
- Length: 498 ft (152 m)
- Beam: 60 ft (18 m)
- Speed: 17 kn (31 km/h; 20 mph)

SS Heraklion (sometimes spelled out in books as the Iraklion) was a roll on/roll off car ferry operating the lines Piraeus – Chania and Piraeus – Heraklion (Irakleio) between 1965 and 1966. The ship capsized and sank on 8 December 1966 in the Aegean Sea, resulting in the death of more than 200 people. Its demise was one of the greatest maritime disasters of Greek history.

== Background ==
SS Leicestershire.

SS Heraklion was built as SS Leicestershire by Fairfield Shipbuilding and Engineering Company in Glasgow in 1949, for the Bibby Line to operate the route UK to Burma. It was chartered by the British India Line for some time to supplement its London to East Africa service. In 1964 it was sold to the Aegean Steam Navigation Co to operate as part of their Typaldos Lines, renamed SS Heraklion.

Once Typaldos Line took ownership, it was refitted as a passenger/car ferry. The ship had an overall length of 498 feet (152 m), a beam of 60 ft (18 m), gross register tonnage of 8,922 tons, propelled by a single propeller, reaching a speed of 17 knots (31 km/h; 20 mph). The ship's winter capacity was 35 trucks with an average weight of 10 tons. Heraklion had its last survey on 29 June 1966.

== Sinking ==
At 8:00 p.m. on 7 December 1966, and during extreme weather conditions, with southeast winds blowing at Force 9 on the Beaufort scale, Heraklion travelled from Souda Bay, Crete for Piraeus, after a two-hour delay, allegedly in order to embark a refrigerator truck that, according to most accounts, contributed to the sinking.

Port authorities of Souda Bay who monitored the violent weather throughout the day had prohibited smaller vessels from leaving, but it was believed wrongly that such weather was not a threat to a ship of Heraklion's size. The same night, an advertisement from the Typaldos Lines was shown in many movie theaters in Athens, promoting the Typaldos ships as: "The most luxurious, the most advanced and, of course, the safest.", with the Heraklion being the company's favourite in the advertisement, terming it: "The unmatched ferry Heraklion, with a speed of 17 knots."

After midnight, the Heraklion was crossing the Myrtoan Sea amidst high waves and heavy winds that were steadily gaining speed. As the ship was rolling heavily from side to side, passengers began awakening in their cabins and children started crying. Cars were rocking back and forth, and the ship started taking on water.

At 2:00 a.m., halfway through the voyage, sailing six miles off the small rocky island of Falkonera, the aforementioned refrigerator truck, which was carrying oranges and was either left unsecured or was strapped loosely, started to slam into the midship loading door, which eventually gave way and opened, and the truck plummeted into the sea, where it was found floating the next morning. Water immediately gushed in through the open loading door and the Heraklion started to develop a list.

At 2:06 a.m., the first SOS signal was sent, saying: "This is Heraklion. The midship door has been destroyed. Ship is in danger." At the same time, the list was increasing by the minute and the ship was losing speed. Officers and crew tried desperately to save the ship, but to no avail, as the list worsened and the ship began to sink. At 02:07, the alarm was sounded. Life jackets were handed around hastily and the life boats were lowered desperately into the thunderous waves.

At 2:13 a.m., only eight minutes after the first SOS, Heraklion's radio emitted a signal for the final time. "SOS, we're sinking! Coordinates are 36°52′N 24°8′E! SOS, we're sinking!" After that message there was silence.

== Rescue efforts ==
The SOS signal was repeated twice. The Greek Ministry of Mercantile Marine was underequipped to handle the necessary communications, while the port authorities of Piraeus, Syros and other islands also reported that they were unable to offer assistance due to lack of equipment. Unfortunately, the ferry Minos, which was 24 kilometres (15 mi) away from the scene, did not receive the SOS.

At around 2:30 a.m., the commander of the Hellenic Coast Guard was alerted, followed by the Minister of Mercantile Marine and the Minister of Defence. The Ministry of Defence reported that a ship of the then-Greek Royal Navy was at Syros, but that it would take three to four hours for it to get underway. A number of ships, including two British Royal Navy warships northeast of Crete, received the SOS and altered course for the scene.

At 4:30 a.m., RHS Syros was ordered to sea, while an hour later the premier was informed of the situation and the Air Force was alerted. At 06:30 Premier Stefanopoulos informed King Constantine about the disaster. At 7:20 a.m. a Douglas C-47 Skytrain took off from Elefsis airport; soon after, two more followed suit.

The first messages transmitted from the ships that arrived at the scene of the tragedy at 8:30 a.m were disheartening. There was no sign of debris from the ship and, more importantly, no sign of survivors. The first headlines of Greek newspapers reported that the ship had sunk with complete loss of life. The premier declared a week-long period of national mourning.

At 9:45 a.m, the first C-47 Skytrain arrived at the scene and located the refrigerator truck, while HMS Ashton rushed to the scene as well. The airplane circled above the truck, descending slowly to a lower altitude when the voice of the pilot of the second airplane sounded on the radio, almost commanding: "Your Highness, your flight path is dangerous, take height now!" The captain of the Ashton, realising that the King himself was participating with the rescue operation, radioed: "Your Highness, Ashton is at your service." The King replied, "Thank you. Please follow me," as the airplanes spotted the few survivors and began air dropping life jackets.

At 19:00 Leverton and Ashton docked at the port of Piraeus, where a large crowd had gathered to seek information and to wait for the rescue ships carrying survivors and bodies.

A number of United States Navy ships, deployed in the Mediterranean Sea at the time of the sinking, participated with the search and rescue operations. They included USS Lawrence, USS Bordelon, USS James C. Owens, and USS Strong.

Officially, of 73 officers and crew and 191 passengers, only 46 were rescued (16 crew and 30 passengers), while 217 died. The exact number remains unknown since, at the time, it was customary to board the ship without a ticket, which would only be issued upon sailing.

One of the dead was Michael Robert Hall King (born 1942), a grandson of Robert Baden-Powell. A survivor reported that his life had been saved by a person whose description fitted Michael, but he refused to climb into the lifeboat, and went back to try to save another. His body was never found.

== Aftermath ==
The Greek government's investigation found the Typaldos Lines guilty of negligence for several reasons; there was no drill for abandoning ship, there was a delay of the sending of a distress call, and there was no organization of rescue work by the ship's officers. The company was also charged with manslaughter and faking documents. On 20 March 1968, after a month-long trial, seven defendants received sentences of up to five years in jail, including Haralambos Typaldos, the owner of the company, Panayotis Kokkinos, the general manager, and Nicholas Theodorakis, first mate, as well as the Head of Ship Inspections of the Ministry of Merchant Marine.

It was also found that twelve of the company's fifteen ships had failed inspection by international law. Most of the remaining Typaldos ships were taken over and sold, either for scrap or other uses, to meet the costs of damages to the victims and crew severance pay. Three ships — Hellas, Athinai and Rodos — failed to find buyers and were laid up for 20 years before being sold for scrap and broken up in Turkey in 1989. In the meantime, the badly rusted Athinai was used in 1978–1979 as a floating set for the movie Raise the Titanic and was renamed Titanic for the duration of filming.

During the 1990s a sculpture known as The Monument of the Hand was erected near the harbour in Chania to commemorate the victims of the accident.

== See also ==
- List of RORO vessel accidents
- MS Express Samina
- MS Sea Diamond
