= SS Santa Paula (1932) =

American ocean liner built in 1932

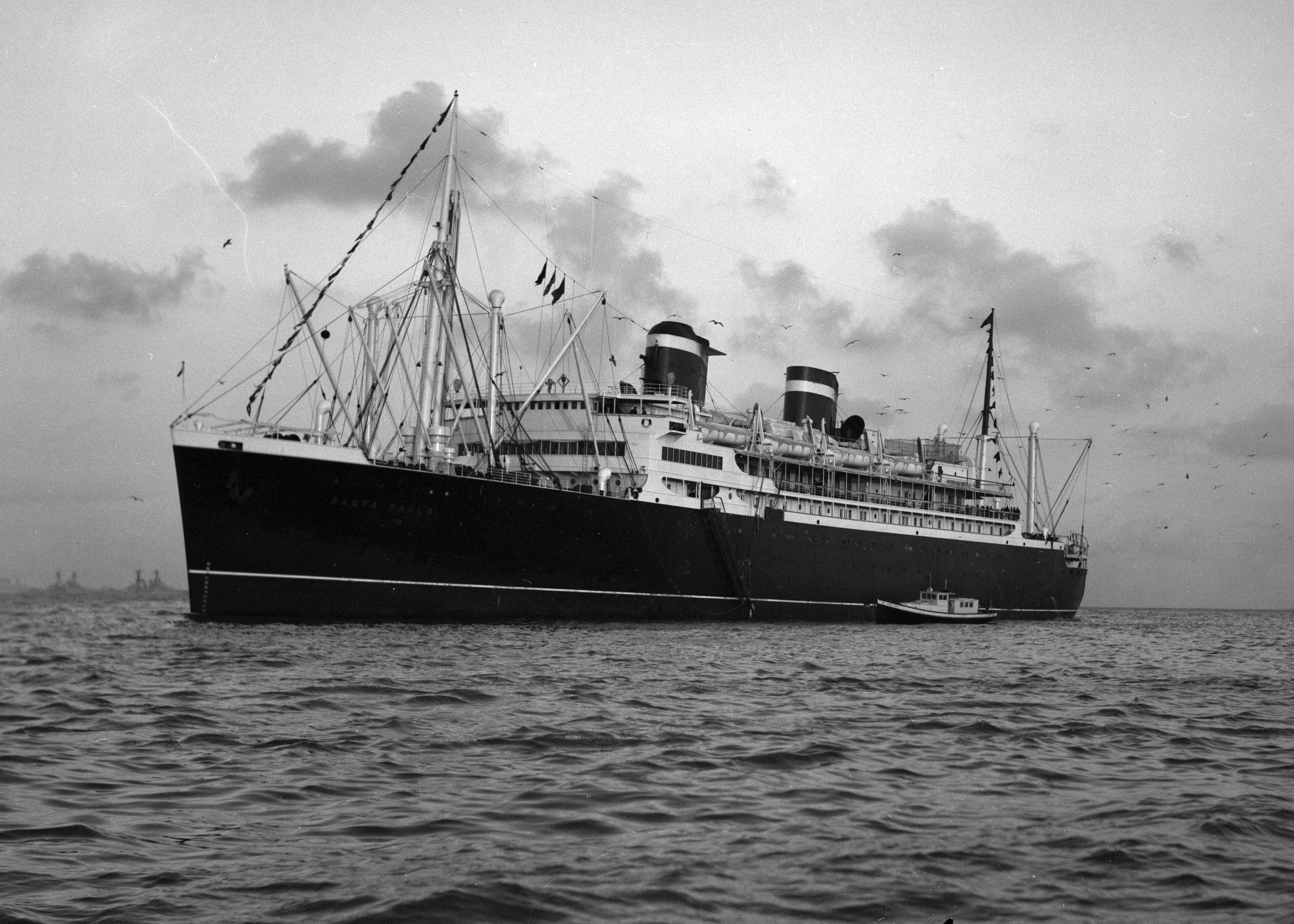
- Santa Paula, c. 1932

History
- Name: SS Santa Paula
- Operator: Grace Line (1932-1941, 1947-1958)
- Port of registry: San Francisco, California
- Route: New York - Havana - Cristobal - the Panama Canal - Balboa - Puntarenas - La Libertad - San Jose de Guatemala - Mazatlan - Los Angeles - San Francisco - Seattle.
- Ordered: 1930
- Builder: Federal Shipbuilding and Drydock Company
- Yard number: 122
- Laid down: 4 August 1931
- Launched: 11 June 1932
- Completed: 23 December 1932 (Delivery)
- Maiden voyage: 24 January 1933 arrival San Francisco
- Out of service: 1958
- Identification: Official number:232005; Call letters: WKEK
- Fate: Sold in 1961
- Name: USAT Santa Paula
- Operator: War Shipping Administration (1941–46)
- Port of registry: San Francisco, California
- Name: SS Acropolis
- Operator: Aegean Steam Navigation Co (Typaldos Line)
- Acquired: 1961
- In service: 1961
- Out of service: 1966
- Home port: Piraeus, Greece
- Identification: IMO number: 5002041
- Fate: Scrapped 1971, Eleusis, Greece

General characteristics
- Tonnage: 9,135 GRT, 3,839 NRT
- Displacement: Commercial 16,500 tons
- Length: 508 ft (154.8 m) (overall); 484.4 ft (147.6 m) (registry)
- Beam: 72.2 ft (22.0 m)
- Draft: 26 ft 2.5 in (8.0 m)
- Depth: 25.8 ft 11 in (8.1 m) (register); 38 ft 11 in (11.9 m) (molded to B deck)
- Installed power: 4 X Babcock & Wilcox boilers furnishing steam for main engines & auxiliaries. 2 X 500 kw DC generators 1 on each main engine low pressure side, 2 X 500 kw standby generating sets
- Propulsion: 2 X General Electric double reduction gear steam turbines, 6,000 shp normal, 6,600 shp max (propeller speeds 95/98 rpm),
- Speed: 18.5 knots (34.3 km/h; 21.3 mph) (contract); 20.05 knots (37.13 km/h; 23.07 mph) (trial)
- Capacity: Passengers: 225 first, 65 third class; (As troopship) 2,209; Cargo: 250,000 cu ft (7,079.2 m^{3}) (hold); 42,000 cu ft (1,189.3 m^{3}) (refrigerated)
- Crew: 180 (registry)
- Notes: sister ships: Santa Elena, Santa Lucia, Santa Rosa

SS Santa Paula (later SS Acropolis) was a passenger and cargo ocean liner built for the Grace Line. She was the second of four sister ships (the others being Santa Elena, Santa Lucia and Santa Rosa) ordered in 1930 from the Federal Shipbuilding and Drydock Company of Kearny, NJ. Her regular service route included inter-coastal service between the east coast and the west coast of the US via the Caribbean and the Panama Canal. She later sailed on cruises from New York to the Caribbean and South America. She was the second of three vessels to bear the name Santa Paula for Grace Line service. (The first Grace Line Santa Paula was a 1916-built ship that was sold in 1925 and sunk in 1943.)

== Design and construction ==
Designed by Gibbs & Cox, Santa Paula and her sisters featured their signature winged funnel. The ships were exceptionally powerful and could achieve 18 knots (33 km/h) with only three boilers in use. The main engines were twin steam turbines, double reduction geared to twin screws. The screws turned inward, which made the ships awkward to maneuver. The dining room was on the promenade deck between the two funnels and had a retractable roof to let passengers dine under the tropical sky. All public rooms were on the promenade deck. The dining room formed an atrium stretching up two and a half decks to the retractable dome. Grace Line employed female dining room waitresses instead of male stewards. First class cabins were outside and had twin beds and private baths.

Santa Paula was registered with official number 232005 and call letters WKEK at 9,162 GRT, 484 ft 4 in (147.6 m) registered length with home port of San Francisco.

== Pre-war Grace Line service ==
Santa Paula started her maiden voyage on 30 January 1933 from Seattle, WA and made 12 port calls en route to New York via the Panama Canal. The new Santas offered 19-day cruises every two weeks between Seattle, WA along the California, Mexico, Latin America, through the Panama Canal to Havana en route to New York. In the late 1930s until WWII Santa Paula made 16-day cruises to the Caribbean and South America, and later 12-day Caribbean cruises.

== World War II service ==
Santa Paula was acquired by the US War Shipping Administration (WSA) on 27 November 1941 from Grace Line for wartime service with Grace Line as operating agent for WSA. The ship was operating under an agreement with United States Army until 24 January 1942 when the form of charter was changed WSA bareboat charter. After conversion she carried approximately 2,209 troops. Single or double occupancy cabins were modified to hold six to nine officers while the enlisted men slept in bunks stacked four to six high.

Santa Paula began war service sailing to Australia through the Panama Canal. She next sailed from Charleston, SC to Freetown, Karachi, Cape Town and then to New York. In November 1942 she sailed to Casablanca, Morocco in Operation Torch. 1943 sailings saw trips to Oran, Gibraltar, Casablanca, Argentina, Liverpool, Cardiff, Belfast, Firth of Clyde Palermo and Portsmouth. Voyages of 1944 included a round trip from Boston to Swansea, New York to Cardiff and return to Boston, New York and Norfolk to Naples, New York to Cherbourg and the UK, New York to Leghorn and Naples, and Boston to Avonmouth with a return to New York. In early 1945 Santa Paula visited Naples, Oran, Port Said, Suez, Massaua, Bahrein, Abadan, Naples, and Marseille. From April to December 1945 she made five round trips between New York and Europe as well as a trip to Karachi via the Suez Canal. In her four years of war service she made 28 overseas trips from the United States.

After the war Santa Paula transported war brides and their children from Europe to the US.

Santa Paula and sister ship Santa Rosa survived the war and were returned to the Grace Line with Santa Paula being returned on 30 April 1947. Santa Lucia and Santa Elena were sunk during war service.

== Postwar Grace Line service ==
After her war service she underwent repair and refit prior to redelivery to the Grace Line. A post-war promotional brochure boasted, "...The [Santa Paula and Santa Rosa] have been completely redecorated, refurbished and modernized after their war service; and provided with up-to-the-minute equipment to ensure comfort, speed, efficiency and safety. They have the very latest type of moving-picture equipment, a public address system, a fine orchestra and varied facilities for deck games. Thus equipped, these twin liners offer you the comfort of an attractively furnished country home together with the diversions of your favorite club." She resumed service on 2 May 1947 and now sailed from New York for the Caribbean and the east coast of South America. In 1948, the liner was used for exterior shots of the fictional vessel Southern Queen in the Doris Day musical Romance on the High Seas. In 1958, Santa Paula was replaced by a larger Gibbs-designed liner of the same name. The older ship was laid up at Hoboken, NJ until 1961 when both she and her sister ship Santa Rosa were sold to Greek owners.

== Typaldos Lines service ==
Santa Paula was renamed SS Acropolis and began a new career as a cruise ship for the Typaldos Lines. She entered service for her new owners for voyages in the Mediterranean. A passenger recollection from August 1962 during a Greek Island cruise described the ship as "sweltering" as it was "air cooled" by ceiling air vents but not "air conditioned". In 1965 she operated approximately every 10 days on a round trip from Zeebrugge to Funchal, Santa Cruz (Tenerife), Tangier, and Lisbon. By 1966 however she did not appear in any scheduled sailings. In 1968 the Typaldos Lines owners were arrested and the company dissolved after the Greek government investigation of the SS Heraklion disaster found them guilty of manslaughter and negligence. The company's ships were taken over and sold and the company dissolved. Santa Paula/Acropolis never returned to active service. In 1971 she was scrapped at Eleusis.
