= USS Dempsey (DE-26) =

Evarts-class destroyer escort

History

United States
- Name: USS Dempsey
- Namesake: Richard John Dempsey
- Builder: Mare Island Navy Yard
- Laid down: 1 October 1942
- Launched: 19 February 1943
- Commissioned: 24 July 1943
- Decommissioned: 22 November 1945
- Stricken: 28 November 1945
- Honors and awards: 3 battle stars (World War II)
- Fate: Sold for scrapping, 16 June 1947

General characteristics
- Type: Evarts-class destroyer escort
- Displacement: 1,140 long tons (1,158 t) standard; 1,430 long tons (1,453 t) full
- Length: 289 ft 5 in (88.21 m) o/a; 283 ft 6 in (86.41 m) w/l
- Beam: 35 ft (11 m)
- Draft: 11 ft (3.4 m) (max)
- Propulsion: 4 × General Motors Model 16-278A diesel engines with electric drive, 6,000 shp (4,474 kW); 2 screws
- Speed: 19 knots (35 km/h; 22 mph)
- Range: 4,150 nmi (7,690 km)
- Complement: 15 officers and 183 enlisted
- Armament: 3 × single 3"/50 Mk.22 dual purpose guns; 1 × quad 1.1"/75 Mk.2 AA gun; 9 × 20 mm Mk.4 AA guns; 1 × Hedgehog Projector Mk.10 (144 rounds); 8 × Mk.6 depth charge projectors; 2 × Mk.9 depth charge tracks

The second USS Dempsey (DE-26) was an Evarts-class destroyer escort constructed for the United States Navy during World War II. She was promptly sent off into the Pacific Ocean to protect convoys and other ships from Japanese submarines and fighter aircraft. By the end of the ship's World War II service career, when she returned to the United States, she had accumulated three battle stars.

== Design ==
The Evarts-class destroyer escorts were 289 ft 5 in (88.21 m) long overall, and they had a beam of 35 ft 2 in (10.72 m). They had an average draft of 10 ft 1 in (3.07 m) at their full load displacement of 1,416 long tons (1,439 t). Each ship had a normal crew numbered 156 officers and sailors.

Dempsey was propelled by a pair of diesel motors manufactured by General Motors, which drove a pair of screw propellers. Her propulsion system was rated to produce 6,000 brake horsepower (4,500 kW) for a top speed of 19.5 knots (36.1 km/h; 22.4 mph). Oil storage amounted to between 131 and 197 long tons (133 and 200 t), which allowed a cruising radius of up to 6,000 nautical miles (11,000 km; 6,900 mi) at an economical pace of 10 knots (19 km/h; 12 mph).

The ship's armament consisted of a main battery of three 3-inch (76 mm) /50-caliber guns in individual pivot mounts, which could be used against air or surface targets. These were supported by a light anti-aircraft battery that initially consisted of four 1.1 in (28 mm) /75-caliber guns in a quadruple mount and nine 20 mm (0.79 in) Oerlikon guns. For attacks against submarines, the ship was equipped with a Hedgehog mortar, eight depth charge throwers, and two depth charge racks.

== Service history ==
Originally intended for transfer to the United Kingdom, Dempsey was launched as BDE-26 on 19 February 1943 by Mare Island Navy Yard. The ship was instead retained for use by the United States Navy and assigned the name Dempsey on 14 June 1943, after Richard Dempsey, a naval officer killed during the Battle of Savo Island. The ship was commissioned on 24 July 1943.

From 23 September to 25 October 1943 Dempsey escorted convoys between San Francisco, California, and Pearl Harbor. On 27 October she departed Pearl Harbor screening Tangier (AV-8) to Espiritu Santo, and on 8 November she arrived at Viti Levu, Fiji Islands off which she rescued 45 survivors of the torpedoed troop ship Cape San Juan on 13 November. She screened oilers fueling various task units at sea during the invasion of the Gilberts, then arrived at Pearl Harbor on 2 December for repairs and training. Dempsey sailed from Pearl Harbor on 25 January 1944 escorting a convoy of transports and cargo ships to newly captured Majuro, arriving on 3 February. She escorted White Plains (CVE-66) to Kwajalein, returning to Pearl Harbor on 24 February. The next day she got underway for Nouméa, arriving 8 March, and from 14 March to 22 September served in the Solomons and adjacent islands on local escort and patrol.

Transferred to the 3rd Fleet Dempsey arrived at Manus on 27 September 1944 and sailed on 2 October to screen transports to the Palaus. She patrolled and served as harbor entrance control vessel off Peleliu, on 28 October sinking a Japanese patrol craft and capturing one prisoner. From 20 November 1944 Dempsey sailed on convoy duty from Guam to Eniwetok, Ulithi, and Leyte. On 15 April 1945 her base became Eniwetok, and she continued her convoy duty to Ulithi and Kwajalein, serving also on air-sea rescue patrols until 5 July when she departed for the west coast. Arriving at San Francisco, California, on 18 July, Dempsey was decommissioned on 22 November 1945 and sold on 18 April 1947.

== Awards ==
- Combat Action Ribbon (retroactive)
- American Campaign Medal
- Asiatic-Pacific Campaign Medal (with three service stars)
- World War II Victory Medal
