= Gibbs & Cox =

Naval architecture company

- Type: Naval architecture
- Industry: Shipbuilding
- Founded: 1922 in New York City, New York, United States
- Founders: William Francis Gibbs; Frederic H. Gibbs
- Headquarters: Arlington, Virginia, United States
- Key people: William Francis Gibbs; Frederic H. Gibbs; Daniel H. Cox
- Products: Arleigh Burke-class destroyer; Captain-class frigate; EC2-S-C1-class transport; Freedom-class Littoral Combat Ship; Gleaves-class destroyer; Mahan-class destroyer; Oliver Hazard Perry-class frigate; Tacoma-class frigate; Wind-class icebreaker
- Owner: Leidos
- Parent: Leidos
- Website: https://www.gibbscox.com

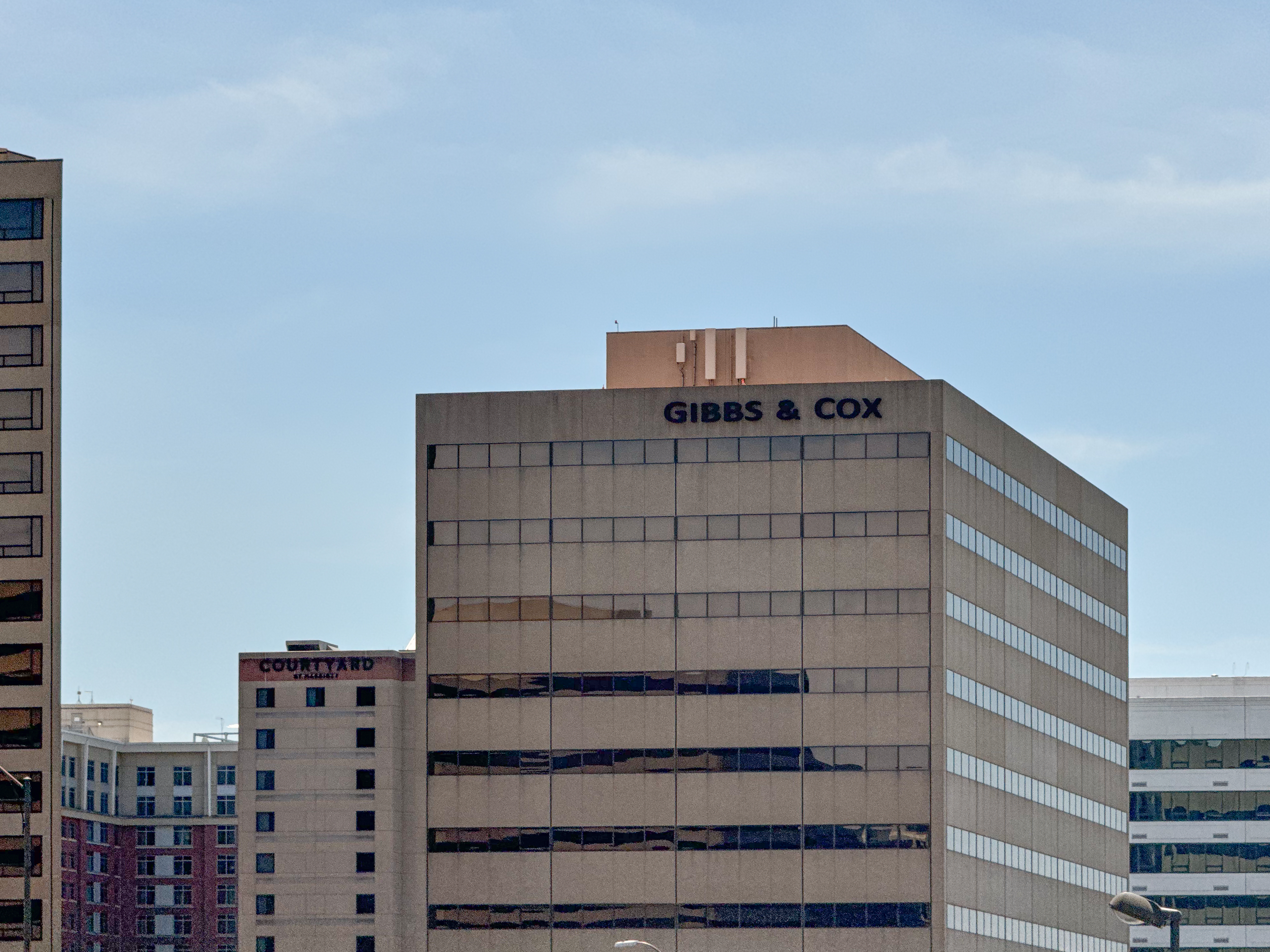
Gibbs & Cox's offices in Crystal City, Arlington, Virginia

Gibbs & Cox is an American naval architecture firm that specializes in designing surface warships. Founded in 1922 in New York City, Gibbs & Cox is now headquartered in Arlington, Virginia.

The firm has offices in New York City; Washington, D.C.; Newport News, Virginia; Philadelphia, Pennsylvania; and New Orleans, LA.

In 2003, more than 150 warships built to the firm's designs, including 60 percent of the U.S. Navy's surface combatant fleet, were on active duty in nearly 20 navies.

== History ==
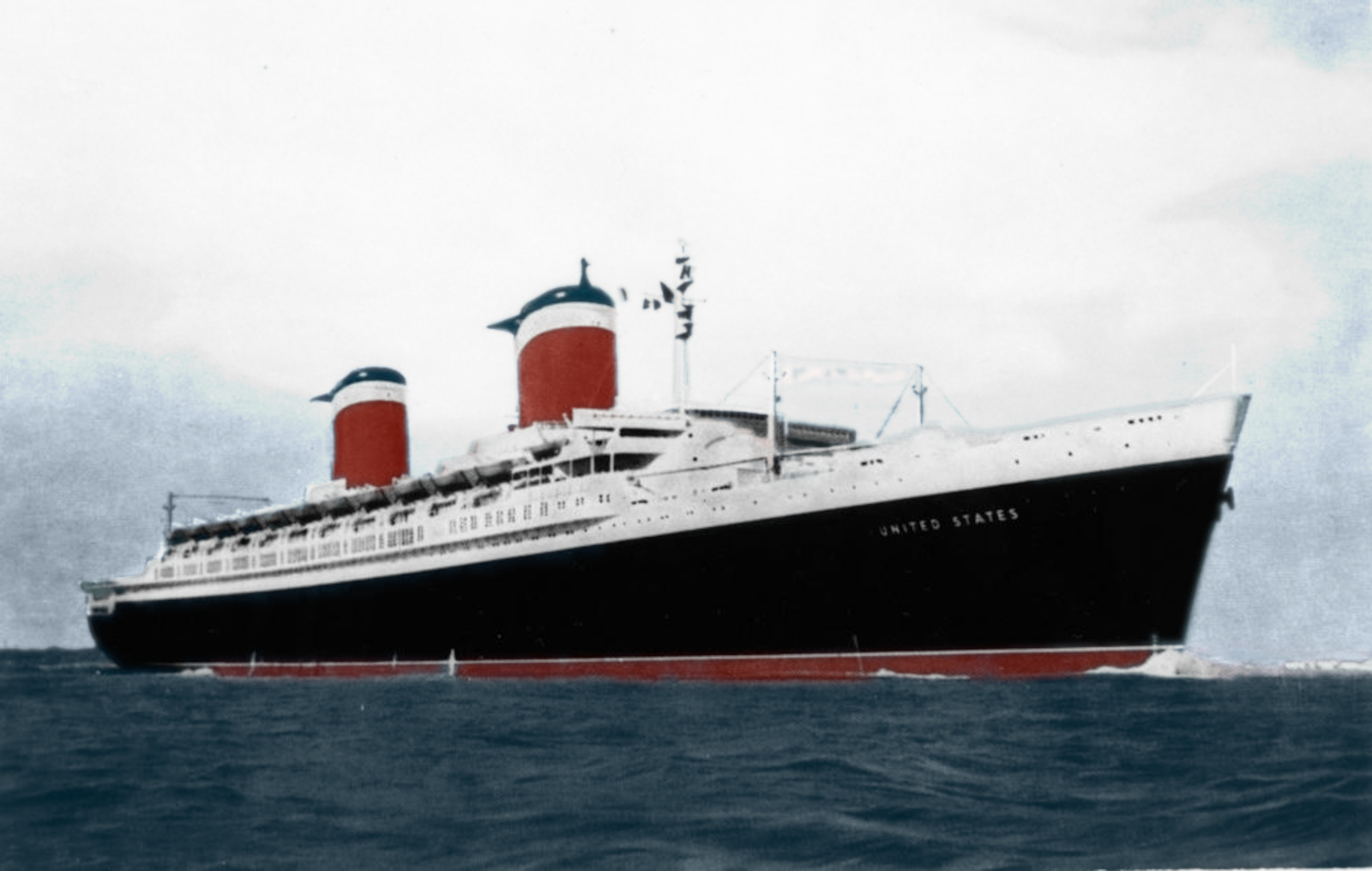
The SS United States in the 1950s

The firm was founded as "Gibbs Brothers" by self-taught naval architect William Francis Gibbs and his brother Frederic H. Gibbs. The name was changed when architect Daniel H. Cox of Cox & Stevens joined the firm in 1929.

In 1931, Gibbs & Cox designed the MV Savarona, a large luxury yacht.

According to company officials, more than 70 percent of U.S. tonnage launched during World War II was built to Gibbs & Cox designs. Ship types included destroyers, LST landing craft, minesweepers, tankers, cruisers, Liberty Ships, and a variety of conversions.

In 1950, Gibbs & Cox designed the SS United States, the largest liner ever built in the United States and the fastest liner built anywhere.

On May 7, 2021, Leidos completed acquisition of Gibbs & Cox for $380 million. Gibbs & Cox operates as a wholly owned subsidiary and is combined with Leidos’ maritime systems division.

On March 4, 2025, the Chinese Ministry of Commerce placed 15 U.S. entities (including Gibbs & Cox) on its export control list, barring the export of dual-use commodities to that business.

== Ships designed ==
Among the ship classes designed by Gibbs & Cox are:

- Arleigh Burke-class destroyer
- Captain-class frigate
- EC2-S-C1-class transport ("Liberty ships")
- Freedom-class Littoral Combat Ship
- Gleaves-class destroyer
- Mahan-class destroyer
- Oliver Hazard Perry-class frigate
- Cheng Kung-class frigate
- Tacoma-class frigate
- Wind-class icebreaker

Among the individual ships designed by Gibbs & Cox are:

- SS America
- MV Chinook
- SS Malolo
- SS Santa Paula
- SS Santa Rosa
- SS United States

== Model shop ==
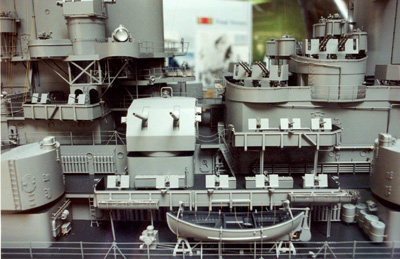
Close-up of USS Missouri model built by Gibbs and Cox, on display at the Washington Navy Yard

From 1939 until 1962, the firm operated a model shop that produced high-quality ship models that are considered among "the very finest examples of the steel ship modeler's art ever to be seen." Of these, the most expensive and elaborate was a 1/24-scale cutaway model of USS Agerholm. This model, which is over 16 feet long, shows the complete inner structure on the starboard, and the exterior on the port.

Another notable model is USS Missouri as she appeared on September 2, 1945, at 9:02 in the morning, the time of the Japanese surrender. This 1/48-scale ship required 77,000 man-hours to construct, and is as of September 2012 on display at the Navy Museum, Washington Navy Yard, Washington, DC.

== Recent contracts ==
- CG(X): "Awarded a Naval Sea Systems Command multi-year contract for program management support, technical management support, ship design support and engineering" in partnership with Alion Science and Technology
- Freedom-class Littoral Combat Ship: design and support of USS Freedom (LCS-1) and subsequent ships.
- Constellation-class frigate: On 30 April 2020, it was announced that Fincantieri Marinette Marine's FREMM multipurpose frigate had won the contest and was awarded a $795 million contract for detailed design and construction of the lead ship, with options for nine additional ships.
- DDG(X): Design and engineering support contract awarded in 2022.
