= Grace Shipping Company =

Defunct shipping company

- House Flag for Grace Shipping Company
- Type: Shipping company
- Founded: 1886
- Fate: Company was sold to Prudential Lines in 1967 in a merger that created the Prudential Grace Line.

Grace Shipping (The Grace Line) was a key part of the parent company, W. R. Grace, for a large part of the corporation's history. The Grace Line began service in 1882, with regular steamship service beginning in 1893. In 1929, the success of Grace Shipping was instrumental for its parent company to enter a joint venture with Pan American World Airways (later to become known colloquially as Pan Am) in order to create Pan American-Grace Airways (Panagra).

In December of 1969, Grace Line was sold to Prudential Lines for $44.5 million, with the merged company renamed Prudential Grace Line.

== 19th century ==
The Grace Line began service in 1882, with ports of call between Peru and New York City. The main source of shipping revenue was from the exporting of guano from the Chincha Islands of Peru to fertilizer manufacturers in the United States. Regular steamship service was established in 1893, with a subsidiary called the New York & Pacific Steamship Co. The first ship to test the route was SS Mount Tabor. Steamships utilized the shorter route of the Strait of Magellan, whereas a sailing ship needed to go past Cape Horn.

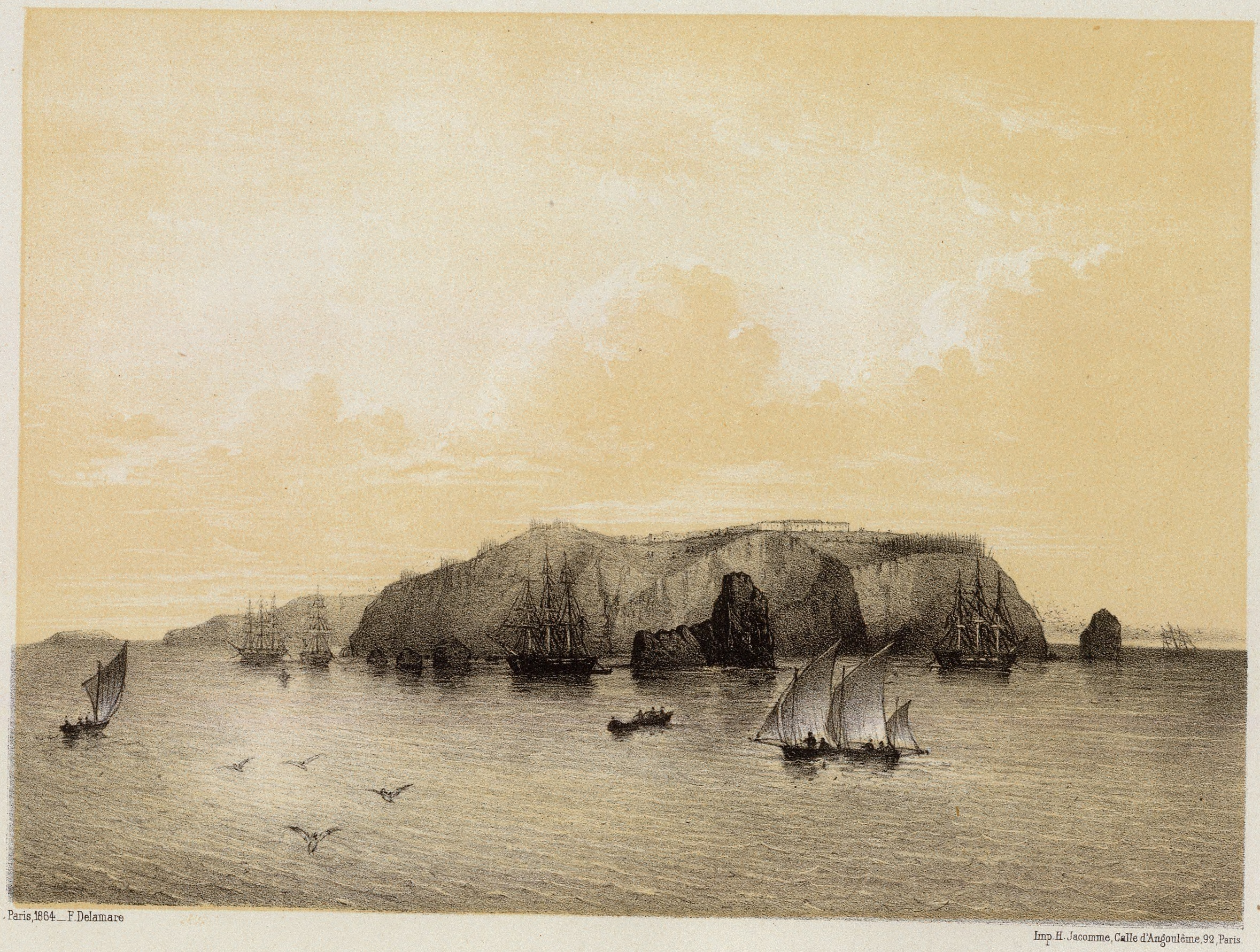
Drawing of Chincha Islands, Peru. 1865

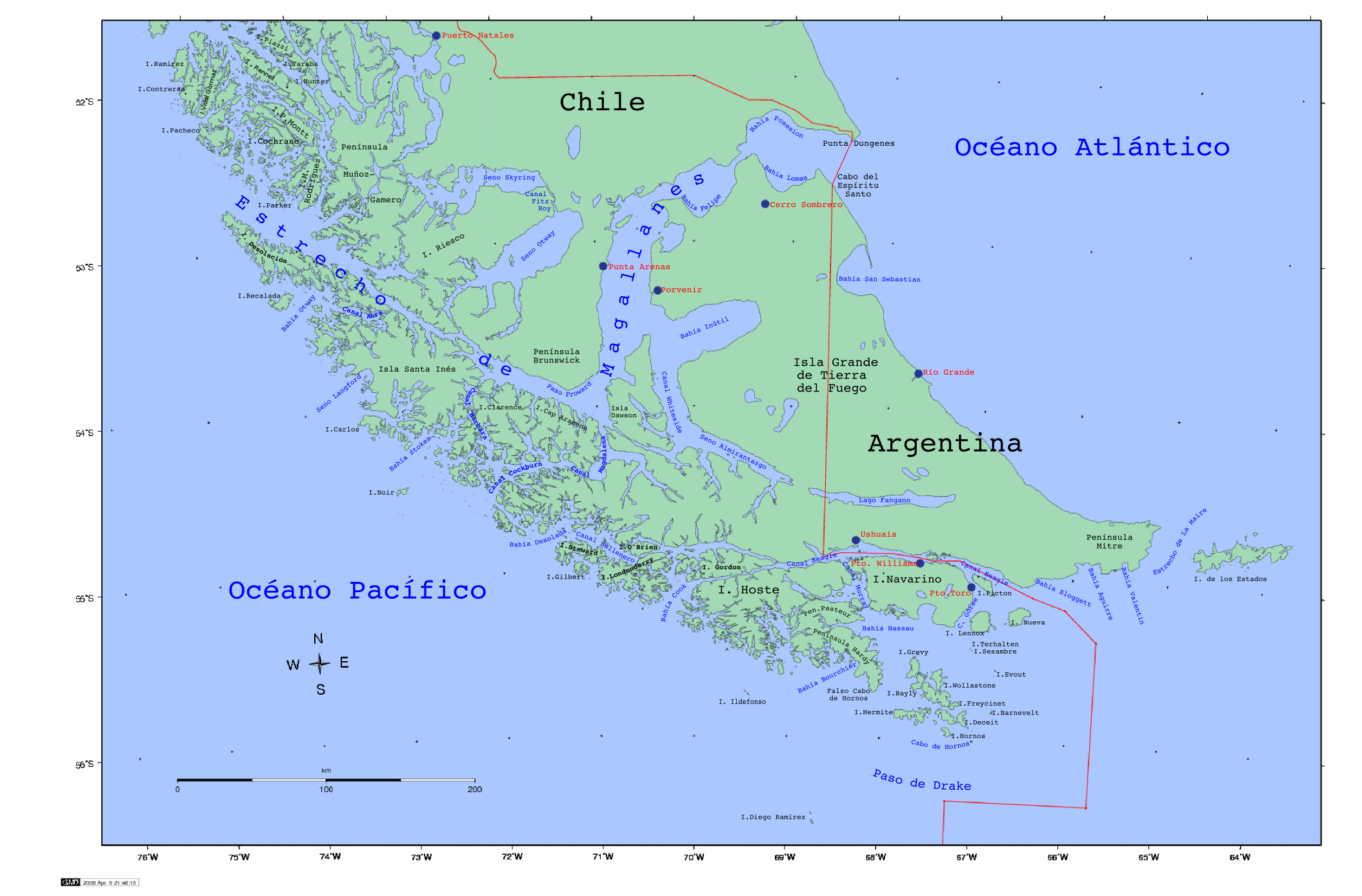
Strait of Magellan

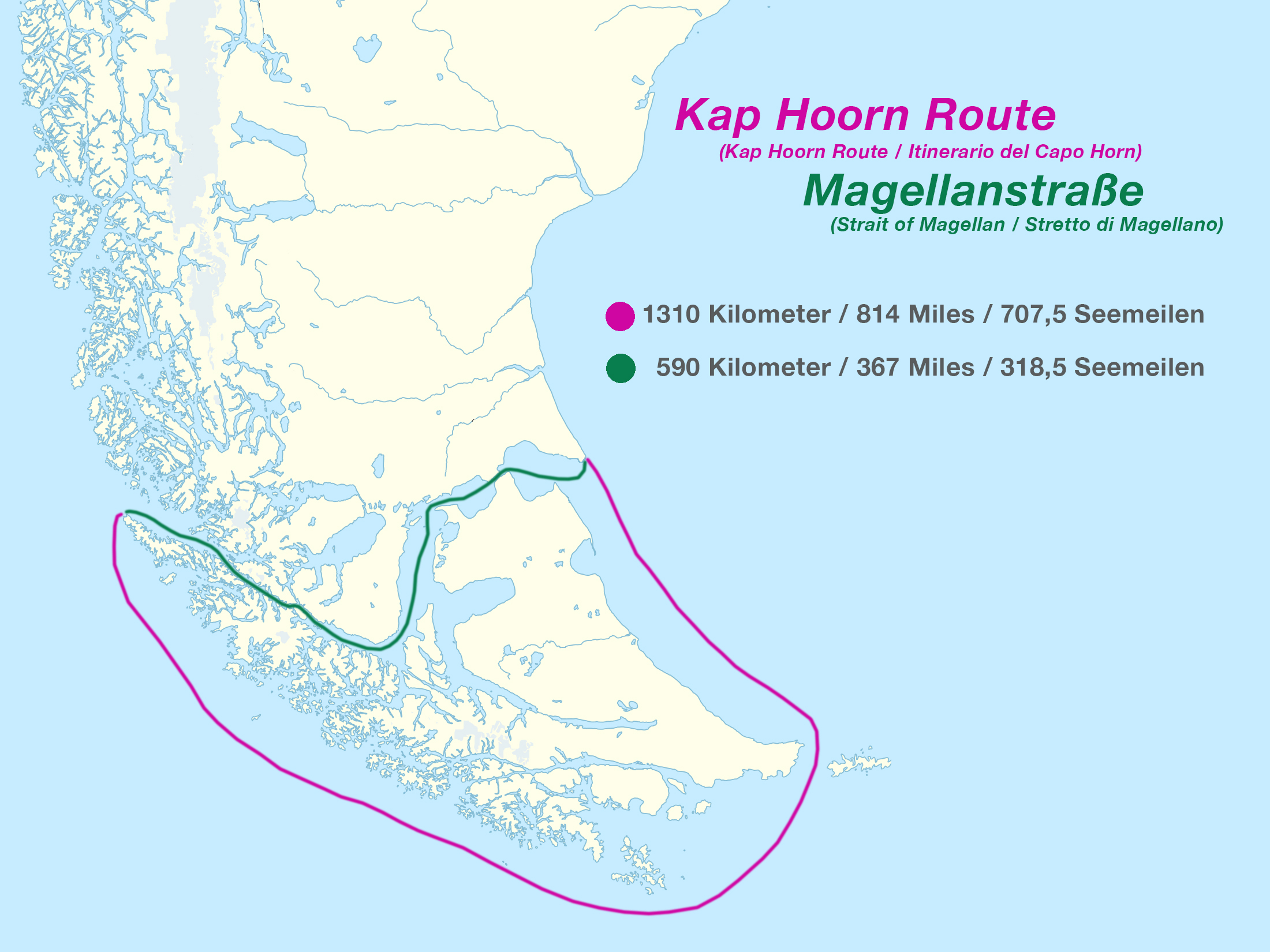
Cape Horn vs. Strait of Magellan

== Beginning of the 20th century ==
The New York & Pacific Steamships, were built outside the United States. These ships sailed under the British flag because foreign built ships before 1914 were banned from the US registry based upon a federal law that had been enacted in 1789. However, US-flag service began in 1912 with the Atlantic and Pacific Steamship Company. In 1913, the company acquired SS Santa Cruz for service from the West Coast of the U.S. to the Pacific coast of South America. The ship had been acquired from the shipbuilder William Cramp & Sons of Philadelphia.

The Grace Lines started with five ships for service from New York City to as far as Chile. There ships were the:

- SS Santa Ana
- SS Santa Luisa
- SS Santa Elina
- SS Santa Teresa
- SS Santa Leonora

Due in part to the enactment by the United States Congress of the Panama Canal Act of 1912 which prohibited railroad companies from owning ships passing through the Panama Canal, Grace Shipping was able to acquire a controlling interest in the Pacific Mail Steamship Company in 1916. Also in 1916, two new ships were acquired in Santa Paula (1916) and Santa Rosa (1916). Santa Paula would later enter service with the United States Navy and gain the prefix USS Santa Paula in World War I. The names Santa Paula and Santa Rosa would later become the names of several ships in the history of the Grace Line.

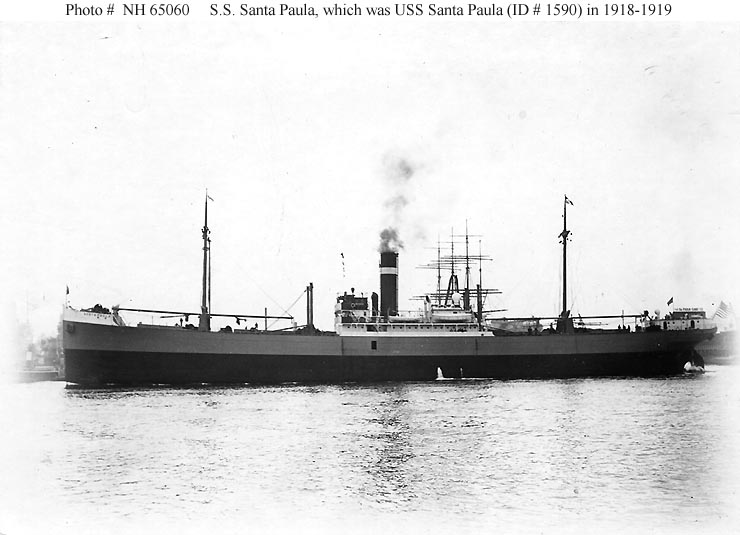
SS Santa Paula, c. 1916

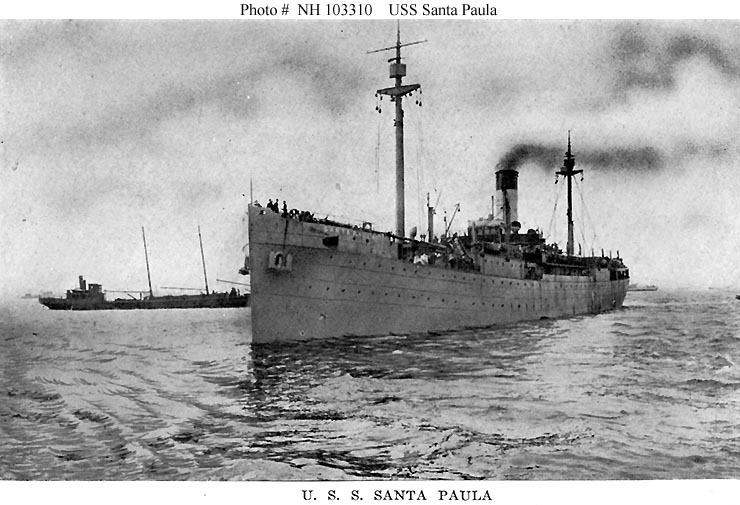
SS Santa Paula later became the USS Santa Paula, c. 1919

== 1920s ==
In 1921, Pacific Mail Steamship Company received five 535-foot (163 m) President-class ships from the United States Shipping Board for transpacific operations.

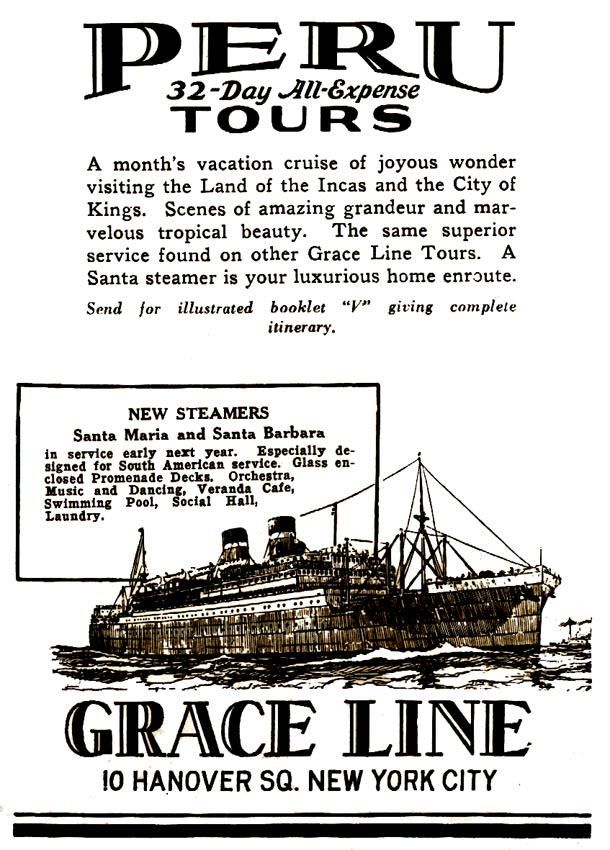
Grace Line Advertisement (1928)

These ships were the:

- President Cleveland (ex Golden State)
- President Lincoln (ex Hoosier State)
- President Pierce (ex Hawkeye State)
- President Taft (ex Buckeye State)
- President Wilson (ex Empire State)

In 1923, the US Shipping Board decided to place the five ships up for bid and Dollar Shipping Company won the bid. With no large ships for the transpacific operations, Grace sold the Pacific Mail, its registered name, and its goodwill (the intangible asset of company name recognition and other assets) to Dollar in 1926. Now without a transpacific service, Grace did not need the six inter coastal freighters (the above mentioned five and Santa Paula) and sold them to the American Hawaiian Line. Santa Paula was renamed Montanan.

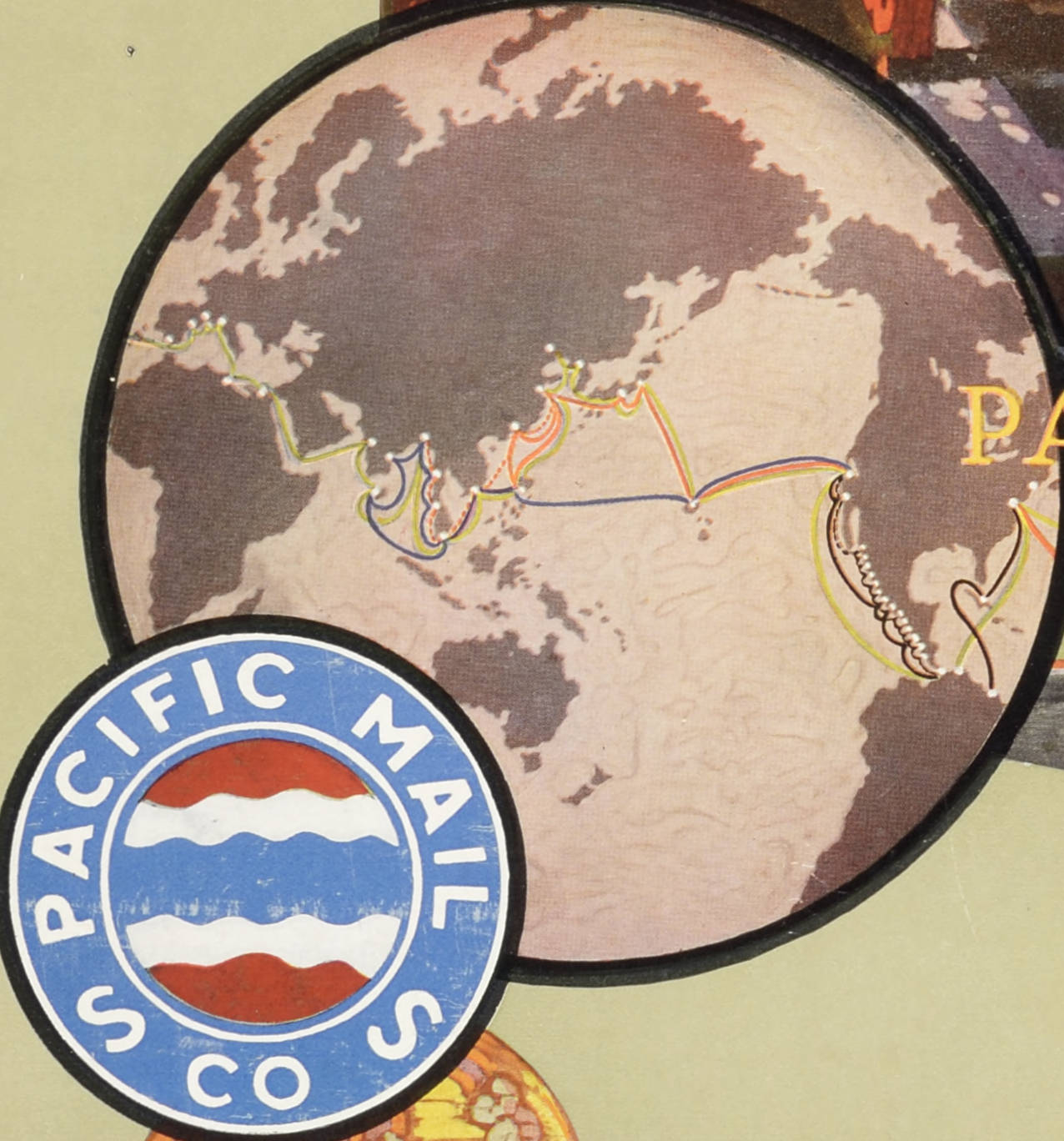
The shipping lines of the Pacific Mail Steamship Company on a world map. (1921)

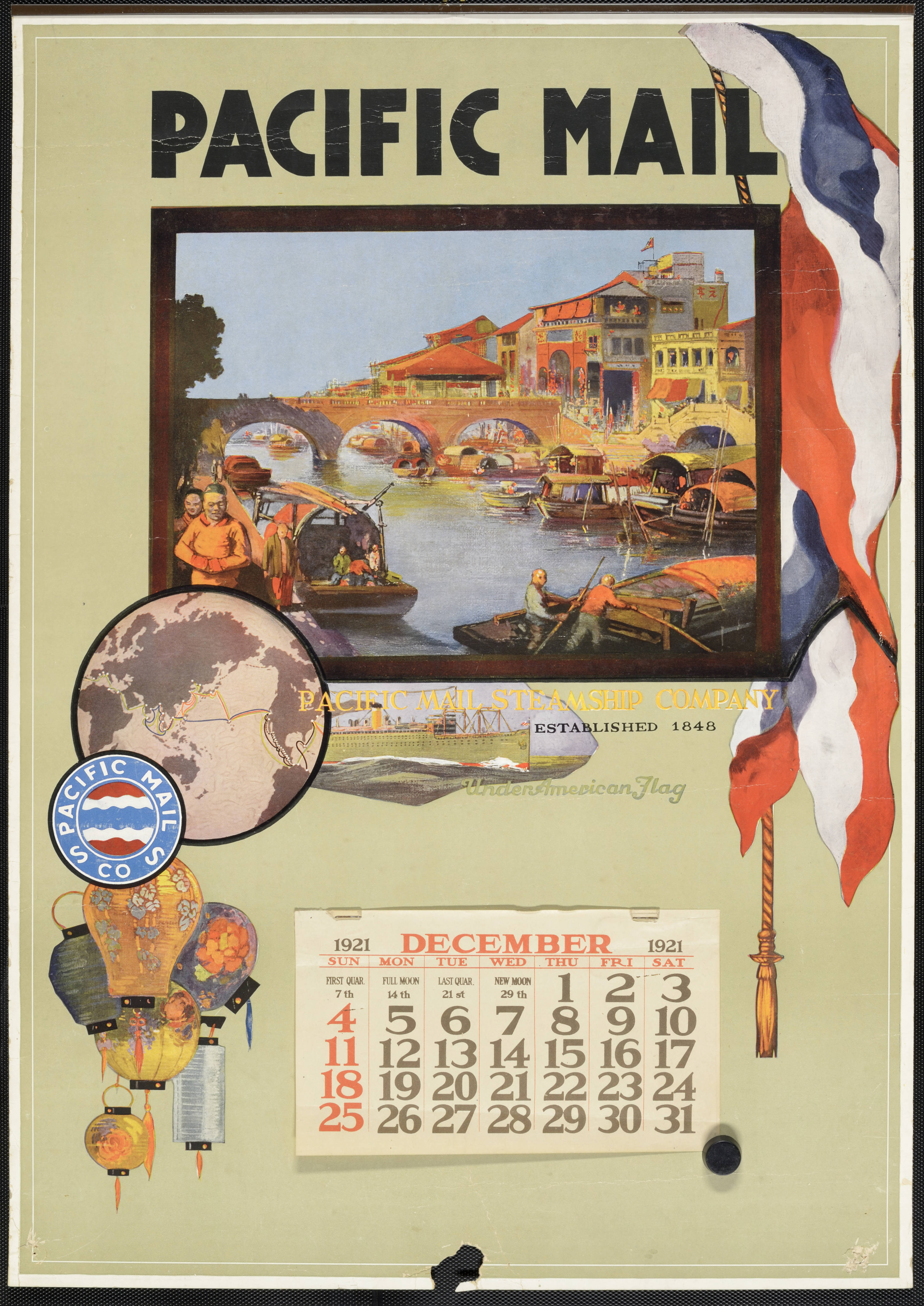
Pacific Mail poster with December calendar.

=== Entrance of parent company into the airline industry ===
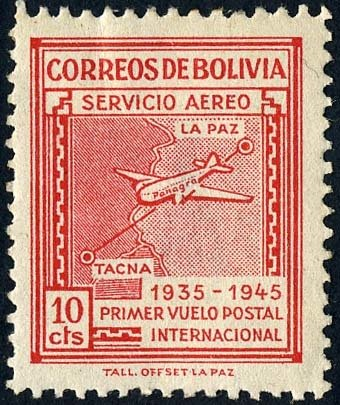
A Bolivian stamp commemorating the postal service created by Panagra (1945).

Logo for W.R. Grace

With the experience of Grace Shipping in South America, the parent company of W.R. Grace and Company was, in 1928, able to enter into a joint venture with Pan American Airways for the creation of Panagra (Pan American-Grace Airways) in South America. The financial stability and experience of the two companies in South America appeared to be a key reason for the Postmaster General to allow US mail service to be handled by this air cargo service.

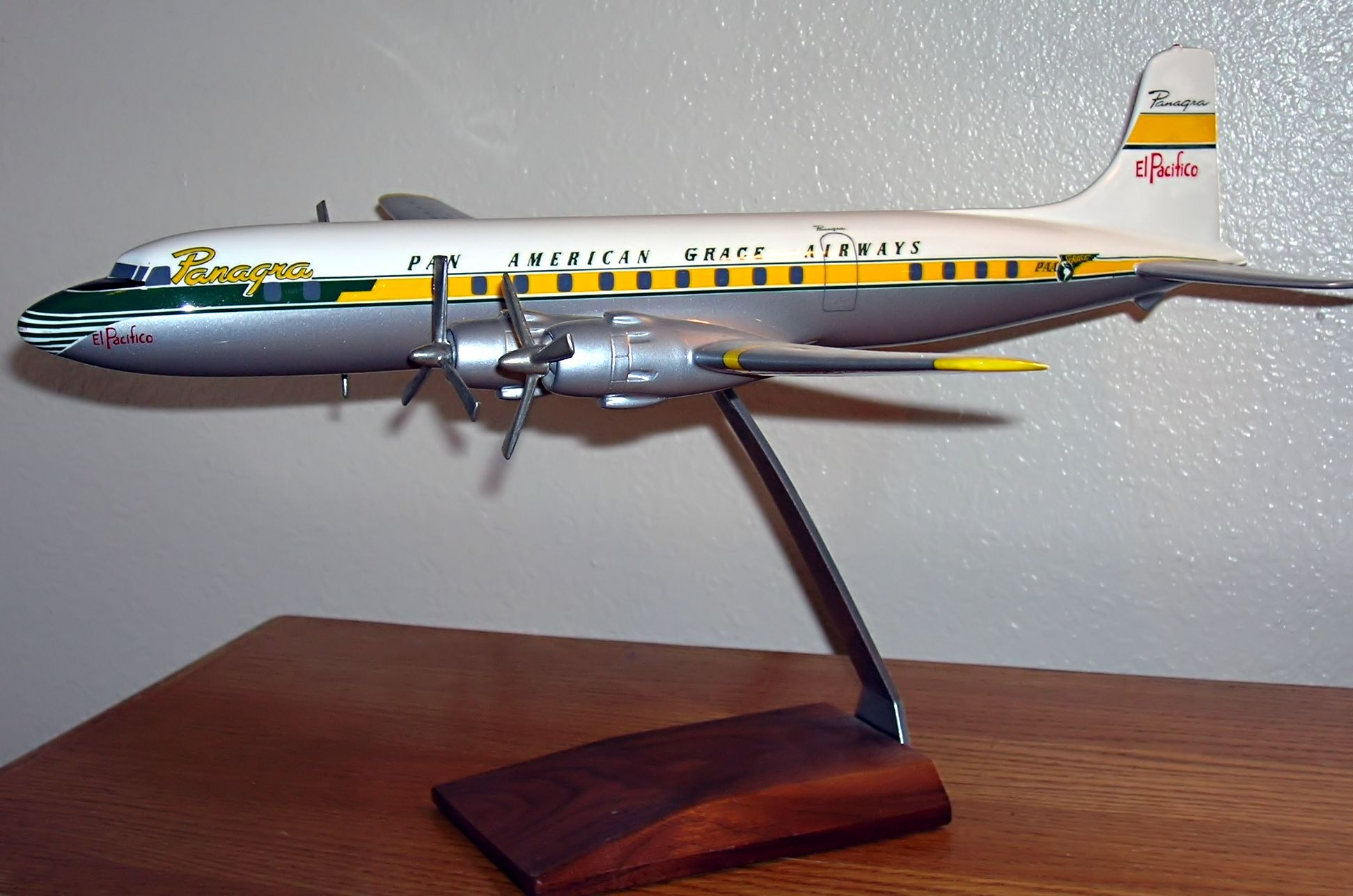
Panagra DC-6

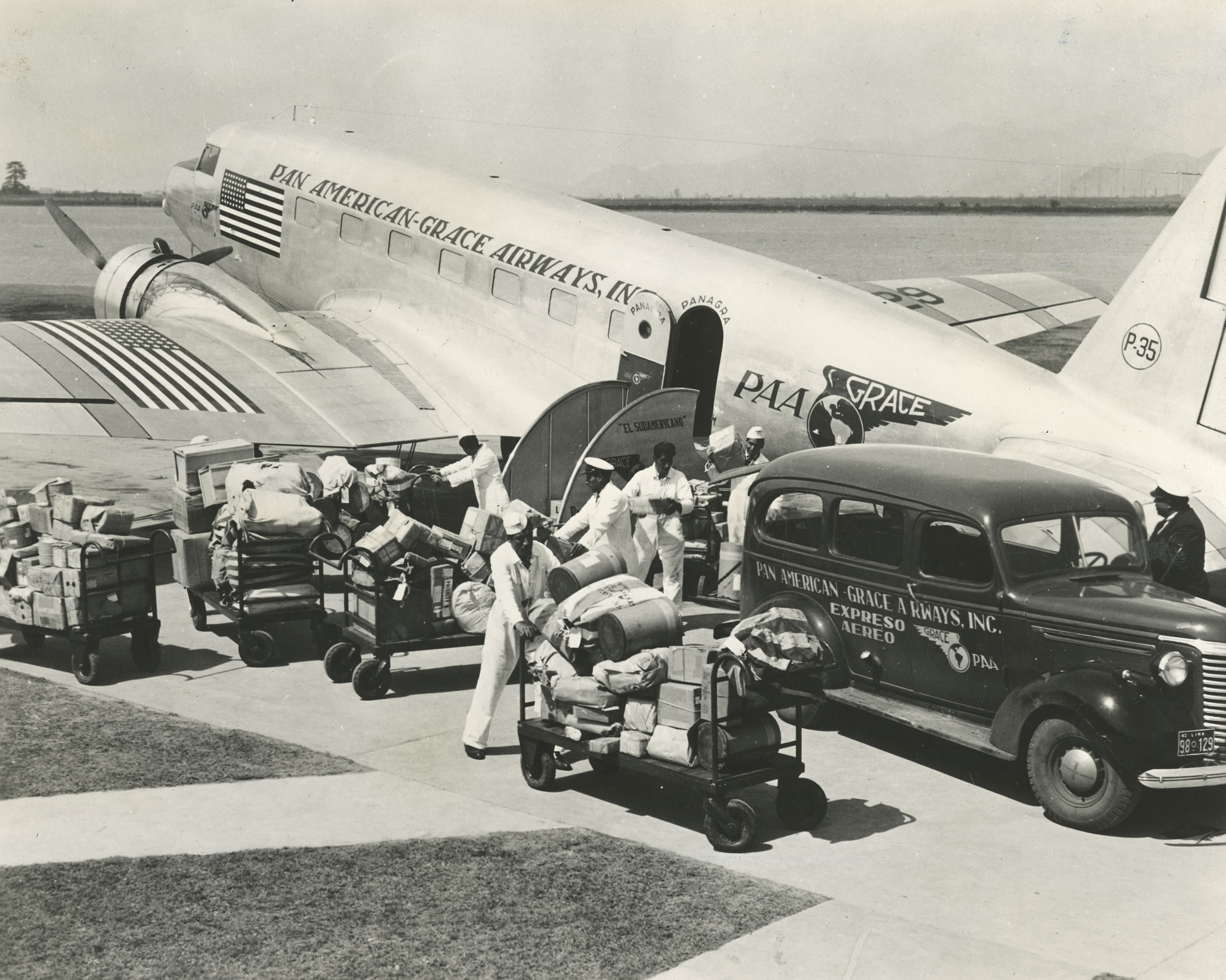
Panagra Flight (circa 1930s–1940s)

== 1930s and 1940s ==
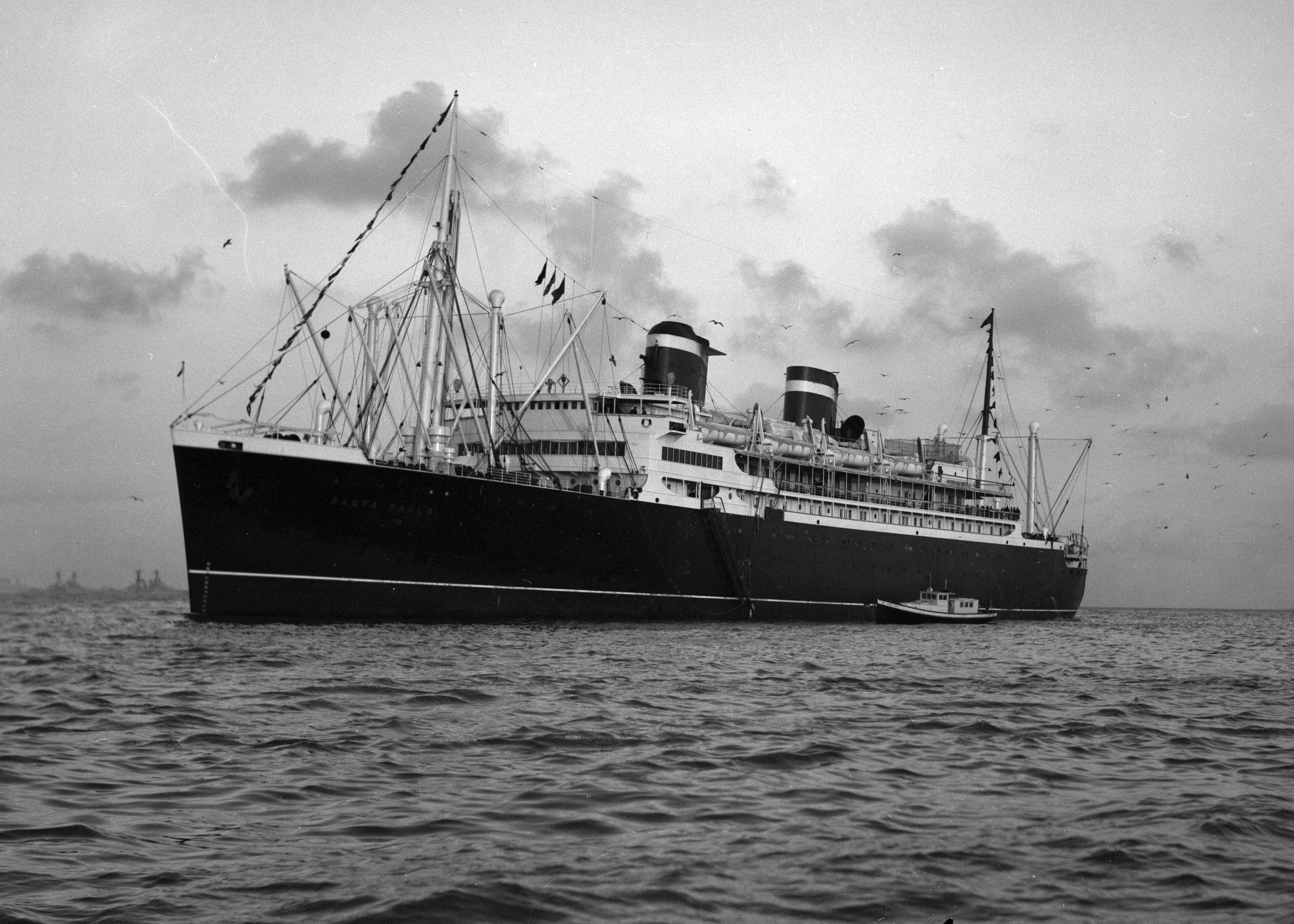
Santa Paula, 1932

In order to comply with existing U.S. Mail contracts, the Grace Line acquired four Santa Rosa-class ships from the Federal Shipbuilding Company of Kearney, New Jersey. The ships were designed by William Francis Gibbs of the naval architecture company Gibbs & Cox. The four ships were Santa Paula (1932), Santa Elena, Santa Rosa (1932), and Santa Lucia (1932). As of 1932, the new Santa Rosa was the most economical steamer at sea in terms of its specific fuel consumption.

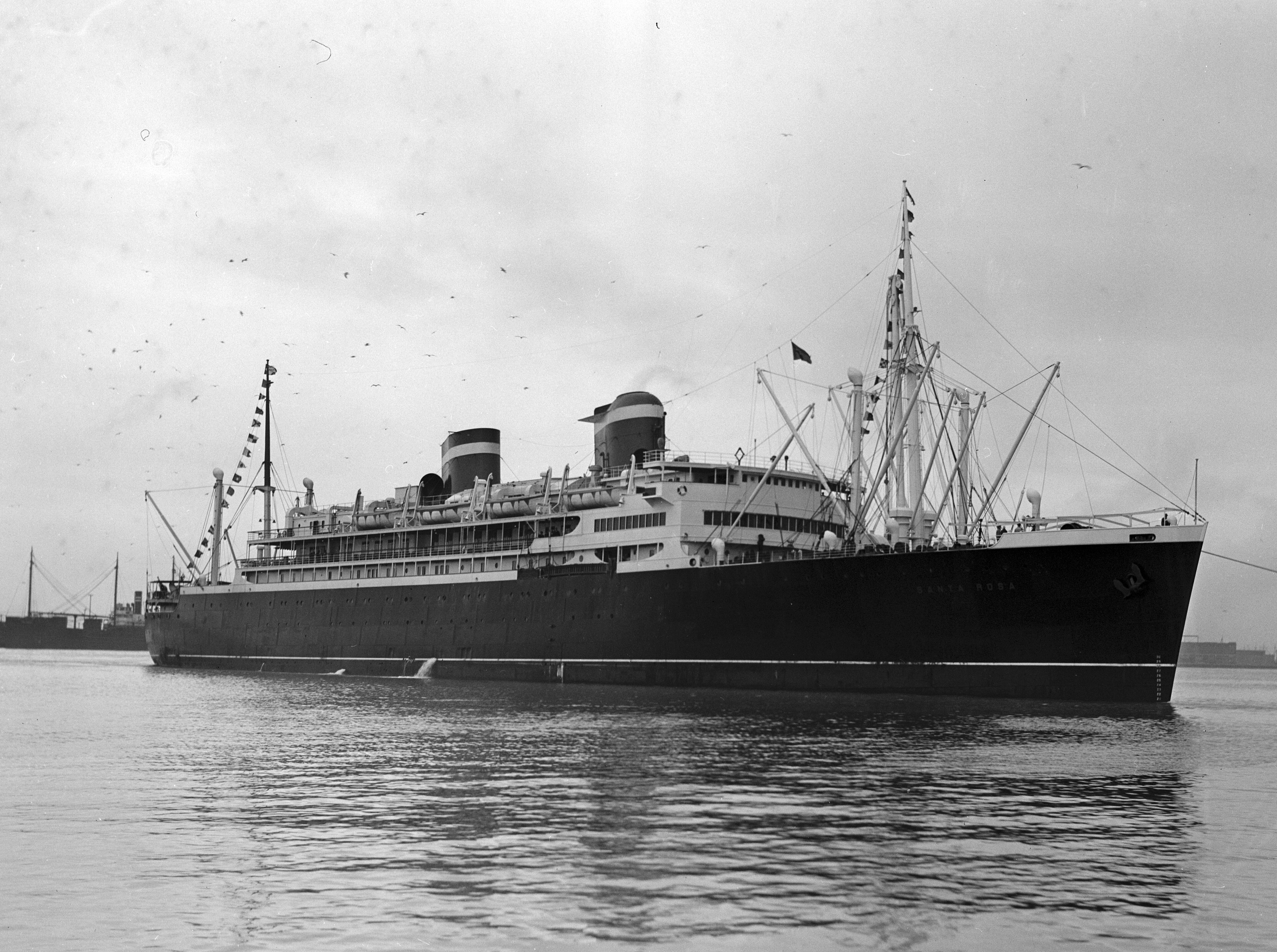
Santa Rosa, 1932

The 1932 Santa Paula was a replacement for the 1916 Santa Paula. In 1934, Grace Line and the Panama Pacific Line announced a collaborative service for fast passenger service between New York and West Coast of the U.S., by means of the Panama Canal. The first ship to launch service from the Grace Line was the Santa Lucia. In 1936, Grace Line acquired the Red D Line (the Atlantic and Caribbean Steam Navigation Company). In 1938 the Colombian Line merged with Grace Line bringing an end to the Colombian Line. During World War II, Grace Lines operated transport for the U.S. War Shipping Administration, including Sea Marlin. Only two ships of the line's fleet would survive,Santa Paula and Santa Rosa.

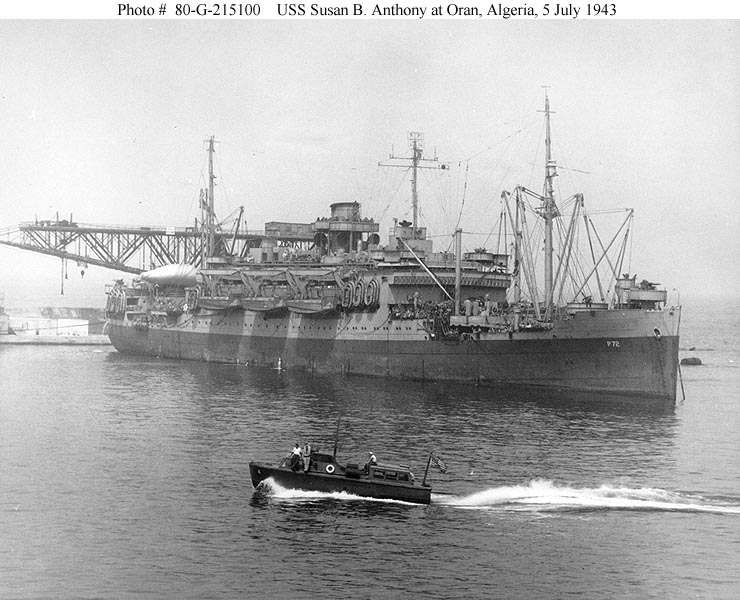
SS Santa Clara after becoming USS Susan B. Anthony

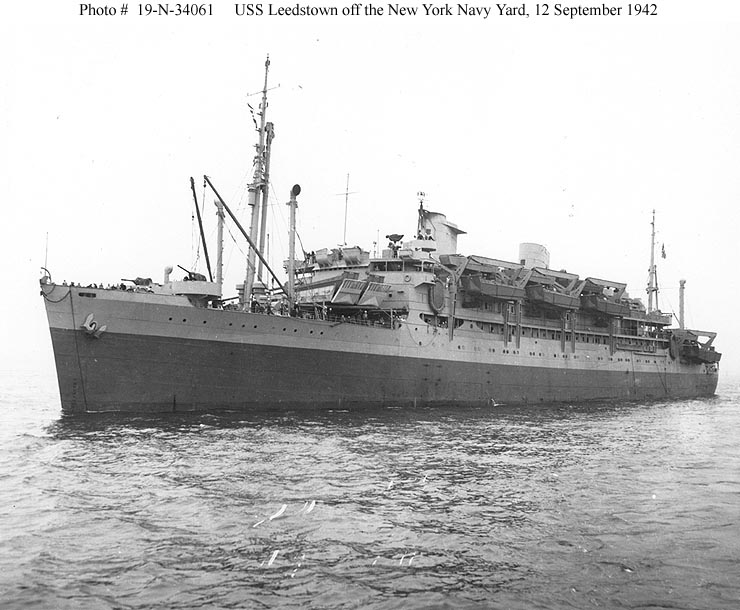
Santa Lucia after becoming USS Leedstown

The ships were:

Name	Year constructed	Year entering service	Type
Santa Barbara	1943	1943	C2 cargo ship
Santa Cecilia	1942	1943	C2 cargo ship
Santa Cruz	1941	1943	C1B vessel
Santa Isabel	1939	1939	C2 freight
Santa Rosa	1932	1942	Passenger and cargo ship
Santa Clara	1930	1941	Turbo-electric ocean liner
Santa Elena	1933	1942	Passenger and cargo ship
Santa Paula	1932	1942	Passenger and cargo ship
Santa Monica	1932	1943	C2 cargo ship
Santa Maria	1942	1943	C2 cargo ship
Santa Lucia (USS Leedstown)	1933	1942	Amphibious assault ship

== 1940s–1950s ==
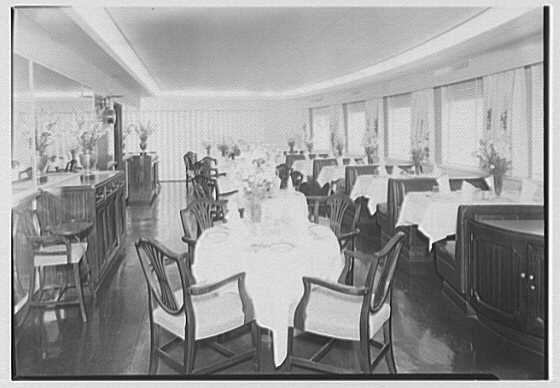
Santa Barbara Dining Room, circa 1946.

After World War II, the Grace line operated 23 ships totaling 188,000 gross register tons (GRT), and an additional 14 more on bareboat charters. However, immediately after the end of the war, private ships were under requisition of the U.S. Government. In collaboration with the United States Maritime Commission, the Grace Line built a new fleet of vessels for post-war shipping services. On November 4, 1945, the president of the Grace Line, R. Ranney Adams, announced the post-war shipping services:

Our new combination passenger and cargo liners will be fast and efficient vessels with accommodations for 52 first-class passengers. Each stateroom will have a private bath. All cabins and public spaces will be air conditioned, first applications of the Latin-American trades.

=== The 1958 versions of Santa Rosa and Santa Paula ===
In 1956, Gibbs & Cox was again the designer and had designed the replacements for Santa Rosa and Santa Paula, the new Santa Rosa (1958) and Santa Paula (1958). Newport News Shipping Company built the ships. The ships had the following features:

- Aluminum paneling for fire protection.
- Gyrofin stabilizers were fitted to improve stability.
- Each room had its own bathroom.
- Extended automatic conveyors for palletized cargo in the holds (cargo compartments).

The ships were designed for twelve-day voyages, with ports of call in Aruba, The Bahamas, Curaçao, Jamaica, and Venezuela.

The key textile designer for the interiors was Dorothy Liebes, who had previously worked with Gibbs & Cox and interior designers Smyth, Urquhart & Marckwald on the SS United States. A profile in Handweaver & Craftsman magazine explained the interior design of the ships for these types of routes as follows:

Handwoven fabrics, along with the work of contemporary artists, sculptors, ceramists, and craftsmen in metal, enamel and glass help to create a fresh, cool, relaxing modern atmosphere, a new-ship look in keeping with holiday travel in tropical waters.

Santa Paula was launched on January 9, 1958 by Patricia Nixon, the wife of then Vice President Richard Nixon.

== 1960s ==
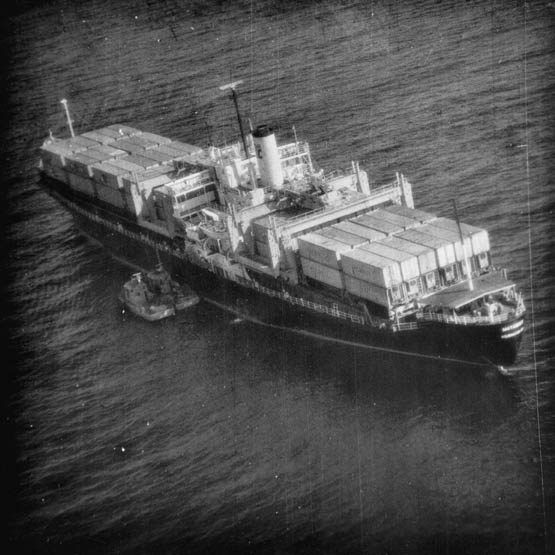
Santa Eliana later became the Mayaguez c. 1975

In 1960, the Grace Line sought to begin containerizing its South American cargo operations by converting the conventional freighters Santa Eliana and Santa Leonor into fully cellular container ships. However, the effort was opposed to by the longshoremen in New York and Venezuela, and the ships were repeatedly laid up idle. The ships were ultimately sold to the domestic container line Sea-Land Service in 1964. Sea-Land immediately modified the two ships to carry its 35-foot containers. Santa Eliana was temporarily renamed Sea and Santa Leonor became Land. The ships were employed on the U.S. coastal and Puerto Rican trades.

=== The L and M ships ===
==== L ships ====
The Grace Line replaced the aging freighters and added six newly built freighters called the L ships.

==== M ships ====
In 1963, Grace made a second attempt to containerize its South American trade when it ordered what was referred to as the M ships, which were:

- Santa Magdalena
- Santa Maria
- Santa M'ariana
- Santa Mercedes

The ships were combination passenger-cargo ships with partial cellular holds. Each ship could carry 125 first class passengers. However, they were no real gain as mixing conventional breakbulk cargo (shipping goods loaded individually) and containers in the same ship was less efficient in terms of the operating economies than full containerization (intermodal freight transport) was capable of. Santa Magdalena, the first of the class, was delivered to Grace Line on February 4, 1965.

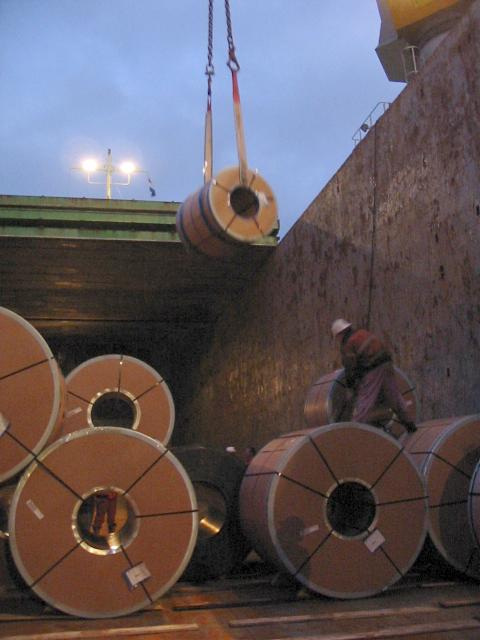
An example of breakbulk cargo

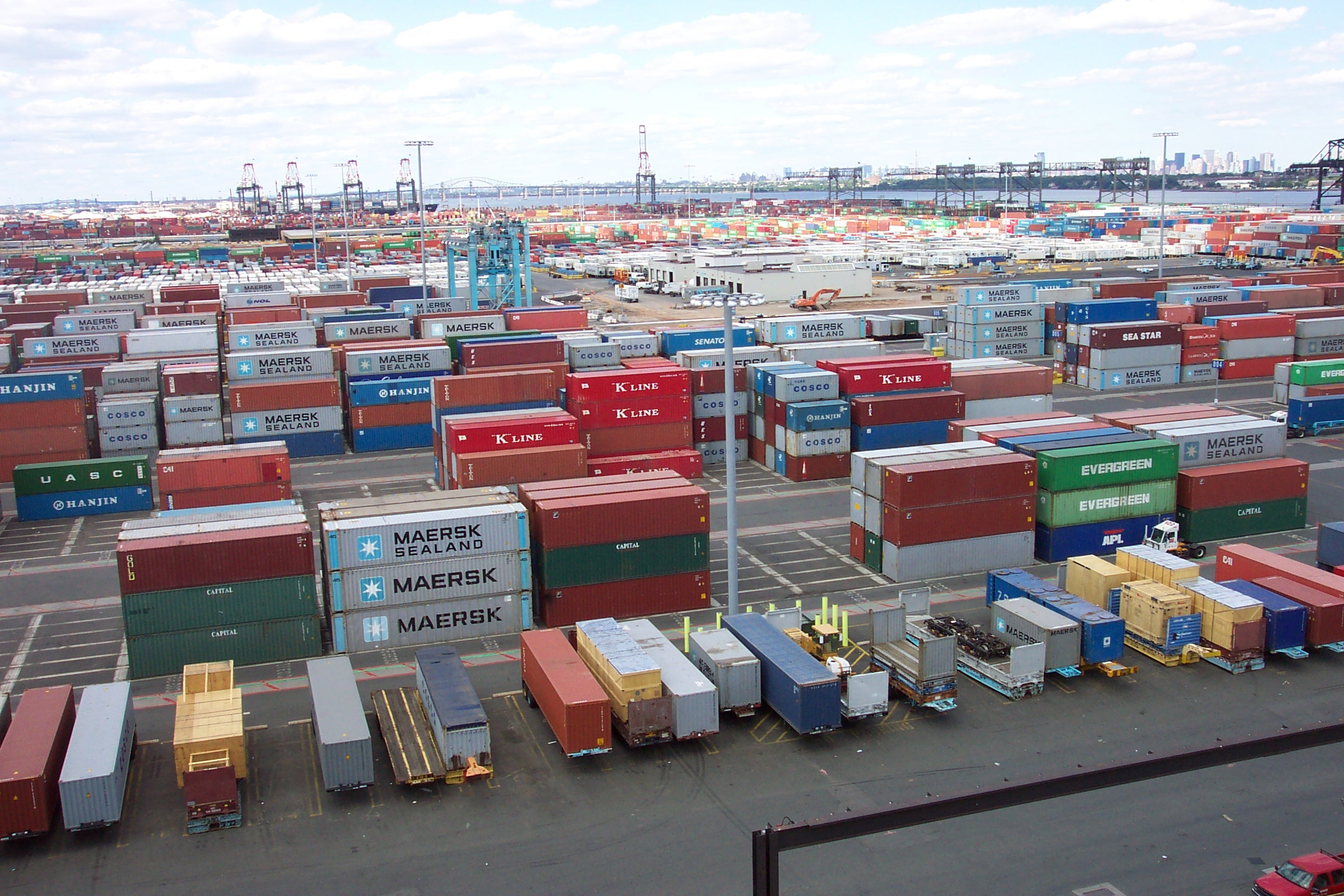
Example of shipping containerization

==== M ship design ====
The ships were designed by George G. Sharpe Company, naval architects and engineers. As an engineering company, operations analysis (operations research) of the trade route was made to determine:

- The characteristics of the cargo moving on the route.
- Establish the feasibility of mechanical handling of cargo in units.

This operations analysis included:

- A detailed study of the cargo commodities transported on the route.
- Analyses of weight, dimensions, net cubic volume, gross cubic volume, port of origin, and port of destination.
- A classification of the cargo concerning its susceptibility to unitization.

In conjunction with trade forecasts prepared by Grace economists, trends in cargo carryings were managed by means of:

- Having trends analyzed
- Having trends projected into the future.

=== Sale of the shipping company ===
In December 1969, Grace Line was sold to Prudential Lines for $44.5 million, with the merged company renamed Prudential Grace Line. Spyros S. Skouras was elected president. A Pacific and Atlantic Division were created. The divisions were managed as follows:

- Arthur C. Novacek, the last president of the Grace Line, headed the Atlantic Division.
- Edmund J. Camuti, the former traffic vice president for the Prudential Line, headed the Pacific Division.

== 1970s ==
The Prudential Grace Line was taken over by Delta Steamship Lines of New Orleans, Louisiana in 1978, allowing Delta to carry on shipping services to Latin America from both the U.S. Atlantic and Pacific Coasts. However, the purchase saw the extinguishing of the name Grace in ocean shipping.

The following events took place for Santa Paula (1958) in the 1970s:

- In 1972, the ship was sold to a Greek cruise company, Oceanic Sun Line, which planned to convert her into the Mediterranean cruise ship SS Stella Polaris. However, the plan was not successful.
- In 1976, the ship was purchased by Marriott Group and four Kuwaiti companies.
- In 1978, the ship was later converted into a floating hotel in Kuwait, the Kuwait Marriott Hotel. Twenty years after it first set sail, it was set to become a floating hotel.

In 1979, the 1932 Santa Rosa, at that point the SS Athenai, was used in the film Raise the Titanic (1980) to portray the sunken Titanic brought back to the surface of the sea.

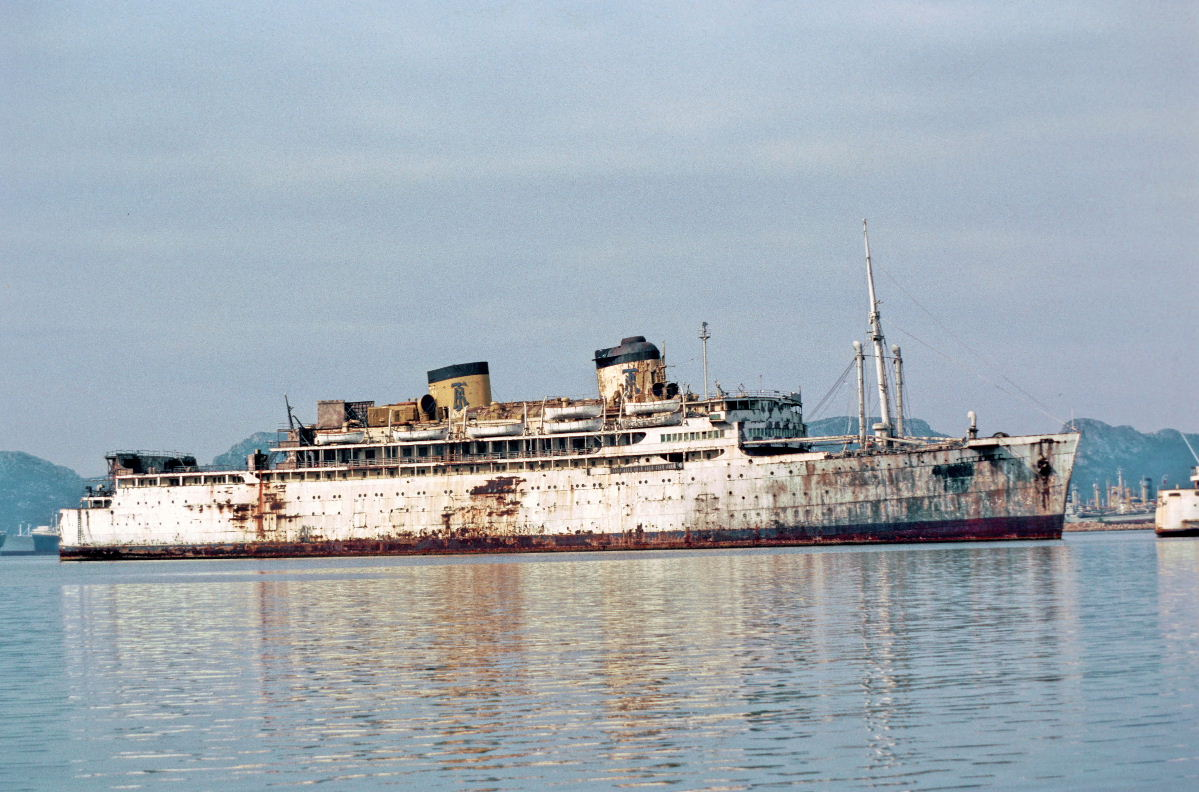
The Athinai (ex Santa Rosa) was used in the filming of Raise the Titanic. Image c. 1986

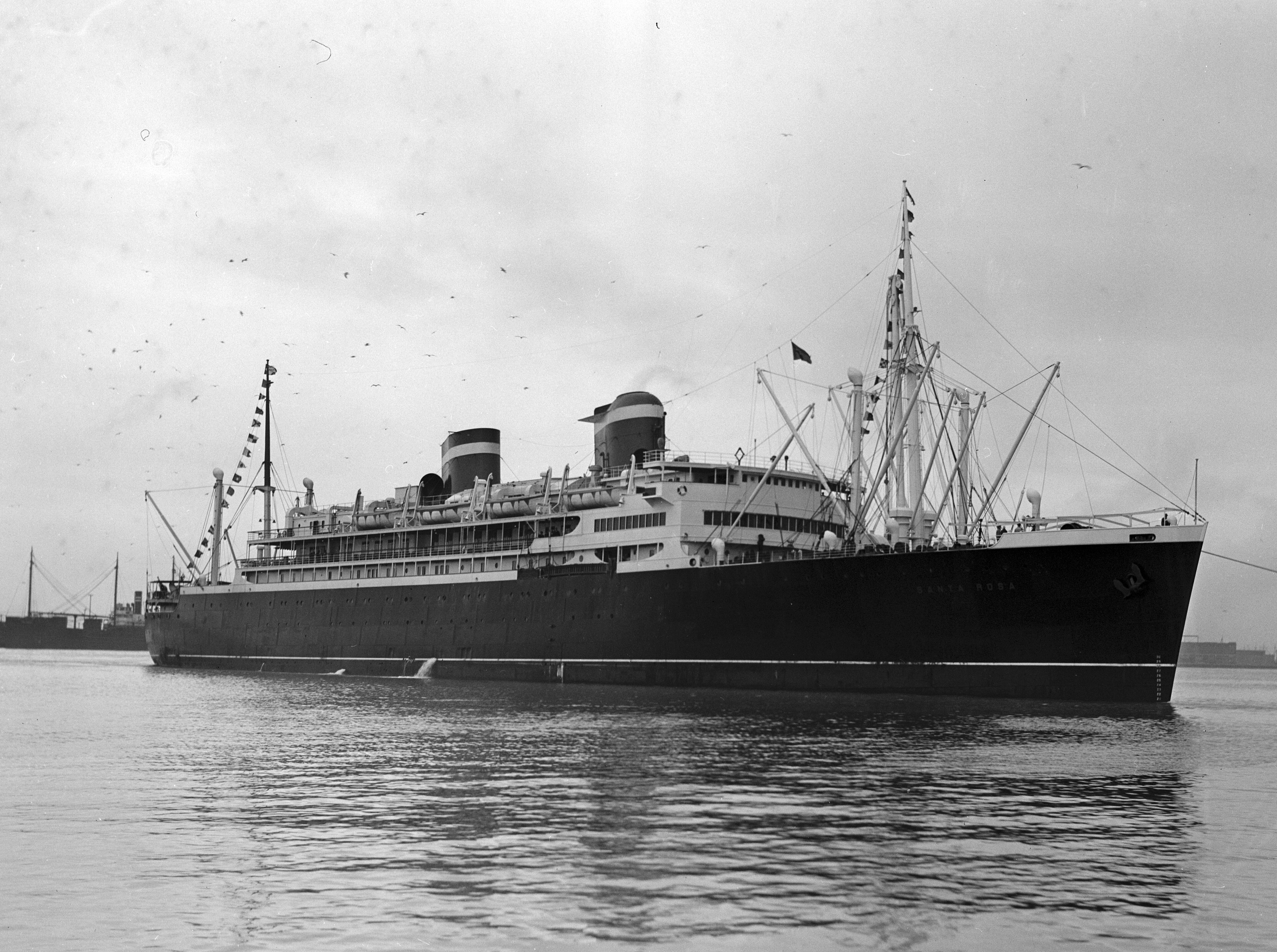
Santa Rosa in 1932

== 1980s ==
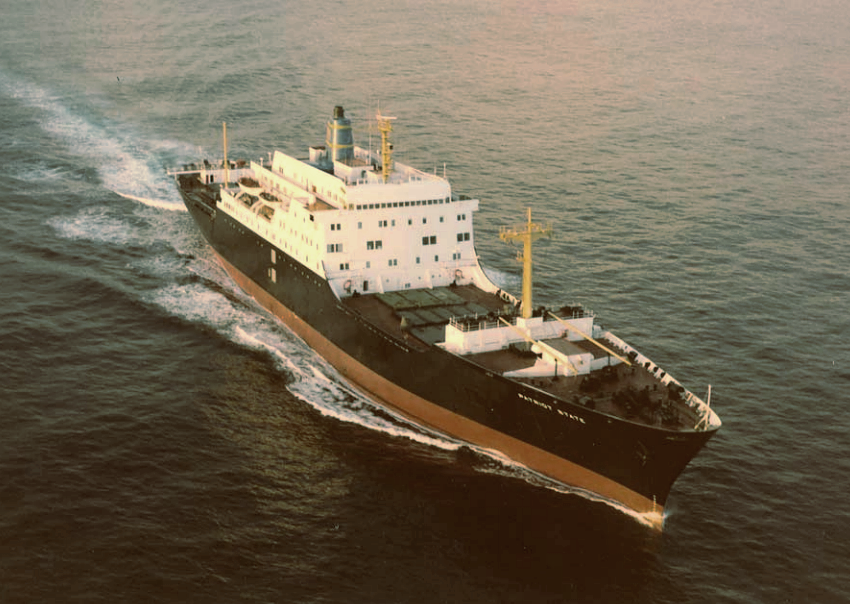
Santa Mercedes after it became Patriot State c. 1990.

Santa Paula (1958), in its converted form as the Kuwait Marriott floating hotel, officially opened in 1980. In 1989, The hotel later became the Ramada al Salaam Hotel.

Of the M-class ships, the ships continued sailing as Delta Line ships until 1983. Santa Mercedes was later converted into a training ship called TS Patriot State for the Massachusetts Maritime Academy after its acquisition in 1984 by the Massachusetts Maritime Administration. Santa Magdalena, the first of the M ships to have been delivered in 1965, was scrapped in 1988.

== 1990s–2010s ==
Santa Paula (1958) as the Ramada al Salaam floating hotel was destroyed during the Iraqi invasion of Kuwait in 1990, the exception of its spare machinery. The spares were later used in the sister ship of the former Santa Rosa (1958). In 1991, the same Santa Rosa was converted into a more modern cruise ship, at the cost of $70 million. The ship would later become SS The Emerald in 1996. The ship was later scrapped in 2012. Almost a century before, the company had acquired the Santa Cruz in 1913 for service from the West Coast of the U.S. to the Pacific coast of South America.

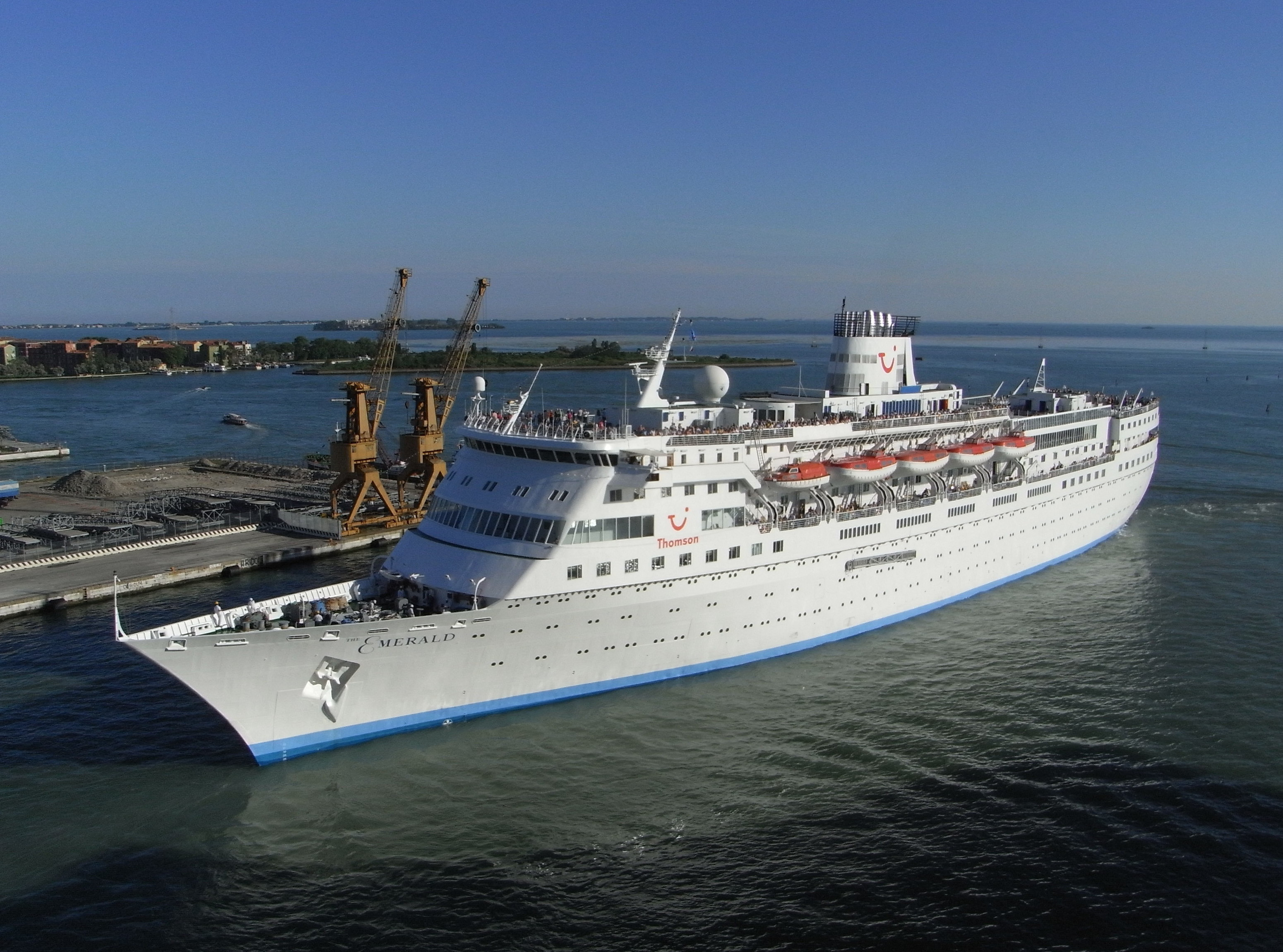
The Emerald (ex Santa Rosa) c. 2008
