= SS Santa Paula (1958) =

Ship built in 1958

History
- Name: 1958-1972: Santa Paula; 1972-1978: Stella Polaris; 1978-1989: Kuwait Marriott Hotel; 1989-1991: Ramada al Salam Hotel
- Ordered: 1956
- Builder: Newport News Shipbuilding Company
- Yard number: 522
- Laid down: January 9, 1958
- Launched: June 28, 1958
- Sponsored by: Pat Nixon
- Christened: By Pat Nixon
- Completed: October 10, 1958
- In service: 1958
- Out of service: 1978
- Identification: IMO number: 5312745
- Fate: Scrapped in 2002

General characteristics
- Tonnage: 15,371 GRT
- Length: 584 ft
- Beam: 84 ft
- Installed power: GE Geared Steam Turbines
- Propulsion: Two Propellers
- Speed: 20 knots
- Capacity: 546 passengers

For other ships with the same name, see SS Santa Paula.

The SS Santa Paula was a passenger/cargo ship built for the Grace Line South American service in 1958, later sailing on Caribbean cruises out of New York. She was one of the last US-flagged ocean liners ever built.

== As the Santa Paula ==
The SS Santa Paula (3) was built at Newport News Shipbuilding Company with her sister ship the Santa Rosa for the Grace Line's renowned New York-Central American service, to replace the two 1932-built 9,100-ton liners of the same names, Santa Paula (1932) and Santa Rosa (1932). The very first Grace Line Santa Paula was a 1916-built ship.

She was christened by Pat Nixon, the then-Second Lady of the United States and set sail on her maiden voyage from New York City on October 11, 1958, just one day after preparations for service were completed. Her sister entered service the following year. The ship was considered remarkable for her time, with her fireproof aluminum panel interiors and, unlike other ships of their service, every single cabin had its own bathroom. In the early 1960s Grace abandoned their South American route and put the Santa Paula and her sister on Caribbean cruising service permanently. On November 25, 1964, while the Santa Paula was returning to New York from the Caribbean, the Israeli passenger ship SS Shalom collided with the tanker MV Stolt Dagali, slicing its stern section off. The Santa Paula was the first ship to respond to the SOS sent out by the tanker's crew, and managed to rescue 25 of the 43 on board. After being operated successfully for 11 years, Grace Line sold their shipping interests to the Prudential Lines, becoming Prudential-Grace Lines. Despite high passenger numbers, in January 1971 she was put out of service and laid up at Hampton Roads, Virginia. Within a year the Santa Paula was sold to Oceanic Sun Line for service as a cruise ship.

== Hotel service ==
She arrived at Piraeus, Greece to be rebuilt into the cruise ship Stella Polaris. This plan fell through, so was once again laid up until 1976, when Marriott International bought her to become a hotel in partnership with four other companies. Stella Polaris went to Yugoslavia, where she was rebuilt for hotel service in Kuwait City. She arrived in Kuwait in 1978, where she was renamed Kuwait Marriott Hotel and was landlocked in a specially made berth raised out of the harbor bed. In 1980 work was finally complete and Kuwait Marriott Hotel opened its doors. In 1989 the hotel was renamed The Ramada al Salaam Hotel.

== Demise ==
The burnt-out Ramada al Salaam after the bombing.

During the Iraqi occupation of Kuwait in 1990 many buildings were bombed or shelled, including the Ramada al Salaam, which was set afire. The blaze rendered her a total loss, but some machinery that was intact after the fire was used in the conversion of her sister ship, the former Santa Rosa, from an ocean liner into a cruise ship in 1991. The ship remained at her berth until 2002, when she was scrapped on site. Her sister continued to operate until 2009, and was scrapped in 2012.
