= SS Santa Paula =

SS Santa Paula may refer to:

- SS Santa Paula (1916), was a cargo and passenger ocean liner built in 1916 for the Grace Line, used during World War I as the USS Santa Paula (ID-1590), then returned to civilian service and sunk by a torpedo in 1943
- SS Santa Paula (1932), was a cargo and passenger ocean liner built in 1932 for the Grace Line, used during World War II as the USAT Santa Paula, then returned to civilian service and scrapped in 1971
- SS Santa Paula (1945), a T2 tanker built in 1945 for Union Oil of California. Scrapped in 1991
- SS Santa Paula (1958), was a cargo and passenger ship built for the Grace Line in 1958, and scrapped in 2002
