= TS Kennedy =

United States Navy training vessel

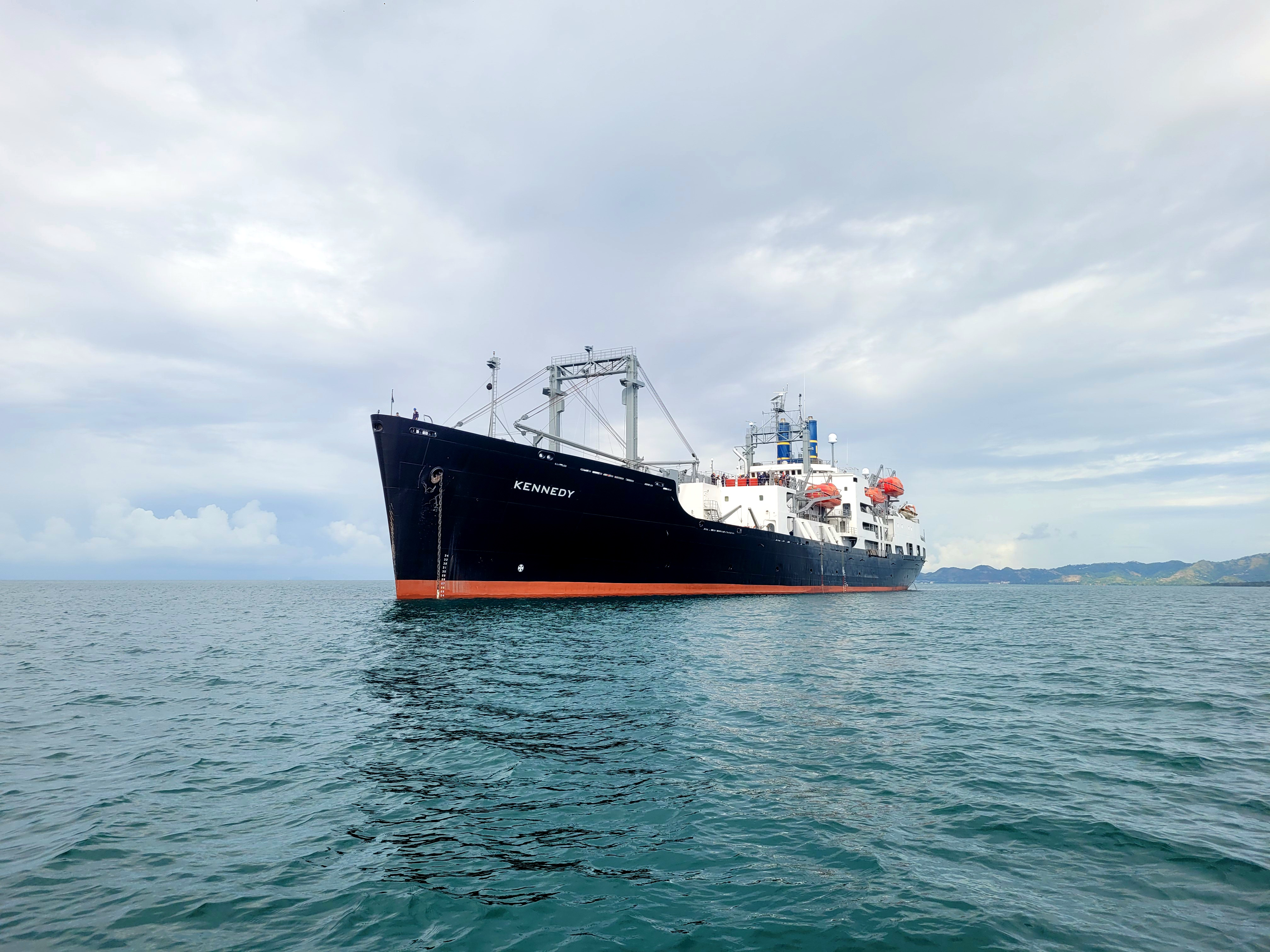
- TS Kennedy anchored in Mayaguez Bay, Puerto Rico in 2022

History

United States
- Name: TS Kennedy
- Namesake: Kennedy family
- Owner: United States Maritime Administration
- Operator: United States Maritime Administration
- Port of registry: Cape Cod, Massachusetts
- Route: Buzzards Bay, Massachusetts
- Builder: Avondale Shipyards, New Orleans
- Cost: $10.5 Million
- Yard number: 1069
- Way number: 182
- Laid down: 24 February 1966
- Launched: 16 July 1966
- Acquired: 15 July 1967
- In service: 1967
- Renamed: SS Velma Lykes, SS Cape Bon, TS Enterprise, TS Kennedy
- Reclassified: 2001
- Refit: 2001
- Home port: Cape Cod
- Identification: IMO number: 6621662; MMSI number: 338919000; Callsign: KVMU
- Fate: Ship transferred to the US Ready Reserve Fleet in Beaumont, Texas. No longer in Active Service.
- Status: Ready Reserve Fleet

General characteristics
- Type: Training ship/Troopship
- Displacement: 18,549 long tons (18,847 t)
- Length: 540 ft (160 m)
- Beam: 76 ft (23 m)
- Height: 119 ft 0 in (36.27 m) from keel to radar mast
- Draft: 28 ft 6 in (8.69 m)
- Depth: 42 ft 6 in (12.95 m)
- Decks: 8
- Installed power: 2 x General Electric ATI Turbine 750kW, ABB Wärtsilä Diesel 1.3MW, Caterpillar 3406 365bhp
- Propulsion: 2 × Marine D Type 600 PSI Foster Wheeler boilers, De Laval steam turbine, single screw, 15,500 horsepower
- Speed: 21 knots (39 km/h; 24 mph)
- Range: 10,000 nautical miles
- Complement: 710
- Crew: 43
- Time to activate: 3 days
- Aviation facilities: Winch-Only Helicopter Deck

USTS Kennedy (T-AK-5059), callsign KVMU, IMO number 6621662, is a former commercial freighter and a current training vessel of the United States Maritime Service.

== Construction and Early Years ==
Kennedy moored at the Massachusetts Maritime Academy Pier (2021) United States Training Ship Kennedy was laid down in 1964 as Velma Lykes, a Maritime Administration (MARAD) Louise Lykes-class freighter (C4-S-66a) hull under Maritime Administration contract (MA 182) at Avondale Industries, New Orleans, LA. She was delivered to Lykes Brothers Steamship Company in 1966. She was known as Velma Lykes until the vessel was reacquired by MARAD and was renamed Cape Bon.

== Government Service ==
Cape Bon was acquired by the Maritime Administration on 26 June 1985, and was placed in reserve at Suisun Bay, Benicia, CA, as part of the National Defense Reserve Fleet. In September 1985, she was renamed Cape Bon (AK-5059). She served the US Government for over 20 years including several tours to the Persian Gulf as part of the First Gulf War.

In 2001, Cape Bon was moved to Buzzards Bay for preparation to replace Patriot State as the training ship for the Massachusetts Maritime Academy. She was converted to be a training ship at Bender Ship Repair in Mobile, Alabama, being delivered and christened Enterprise, after the school's original training ship USS Enterprise, on National Maritime Day 2003. She was renamed Kennedy in January 2009 in honor of the Kennedy family. The TS Kennedy made 23 training cruises with the Massachusetts Maritime Academy. The ship carried thousands of cadets during her service, calling in many Caribbean Island ports as well as making multiple Panama Canal transits.

TS Kennedy was transferred to the Texas A&M Maritime Academy on the Galveston Campus of Texas A&M University in 2023 and departed Galveston for a 70-day cadet training at sea semester on June 7, 2023. She has served as the academy's training ship since and is expected to remain with Texas A&M until 2025, when the new MARAD training ship MV Lone Star State is scheduled to replace her.

In September 16, 2025, TS Kennedy has been officially retired from Texas A&M Maritime Academy, as it has been transfer back to MARAD's Ready Reserve Fleet up until it is her time to get scrapped.

In September 7, 2026, Lone Star State, the replacement ship for Kennedy arrived to Galveston, and is currently serving as the training vessel for Texas A&M Maritime Academy.

== Relief Work ==
Kennedy was deployed to New York Harbor in support of Hurricane Sandy relief efforts in 2012 and Hurricane Maria in Puerto Rico in 2017. Its mission was to house first responders and FEMA SCF personnel

== Gallery ==
USTS Kennedy

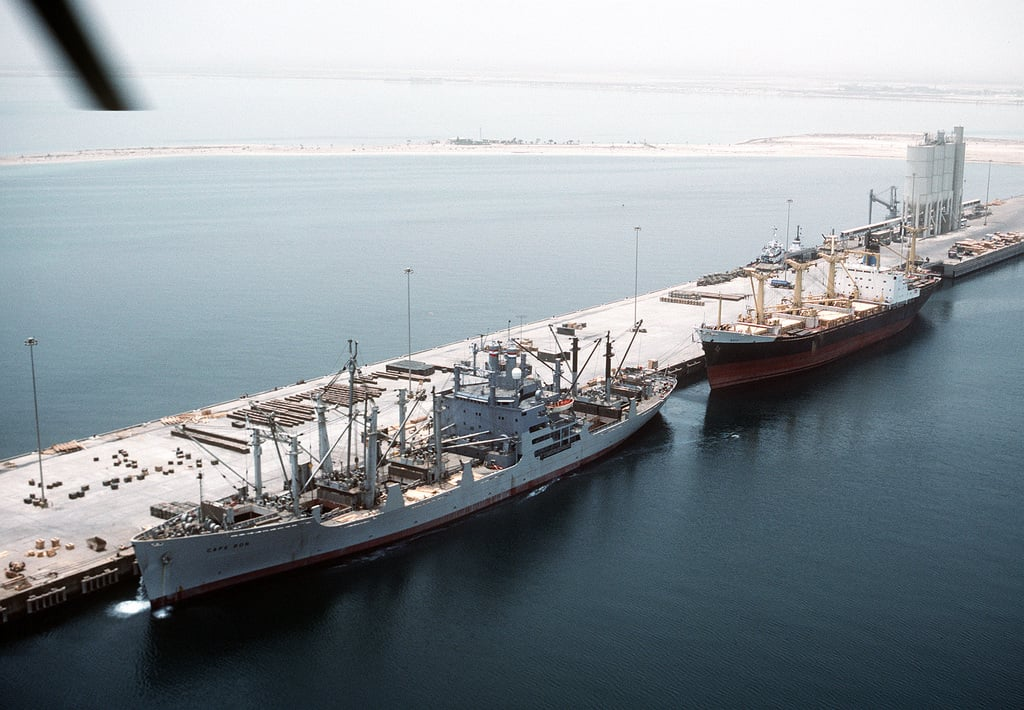
As Cape Bon in 1991

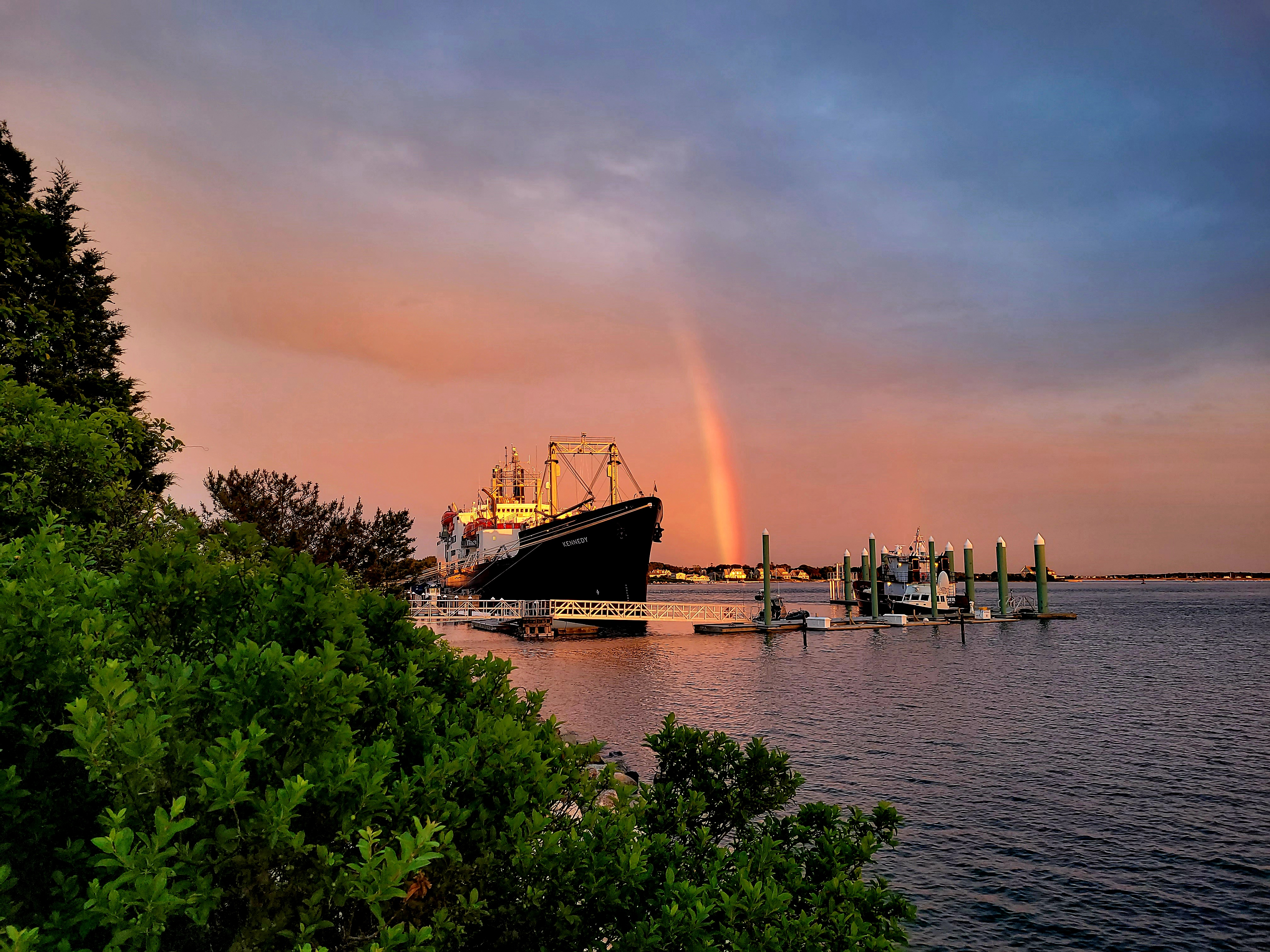
Kennedy moored at the Massachusetts Maritime Academy Pier (2021)

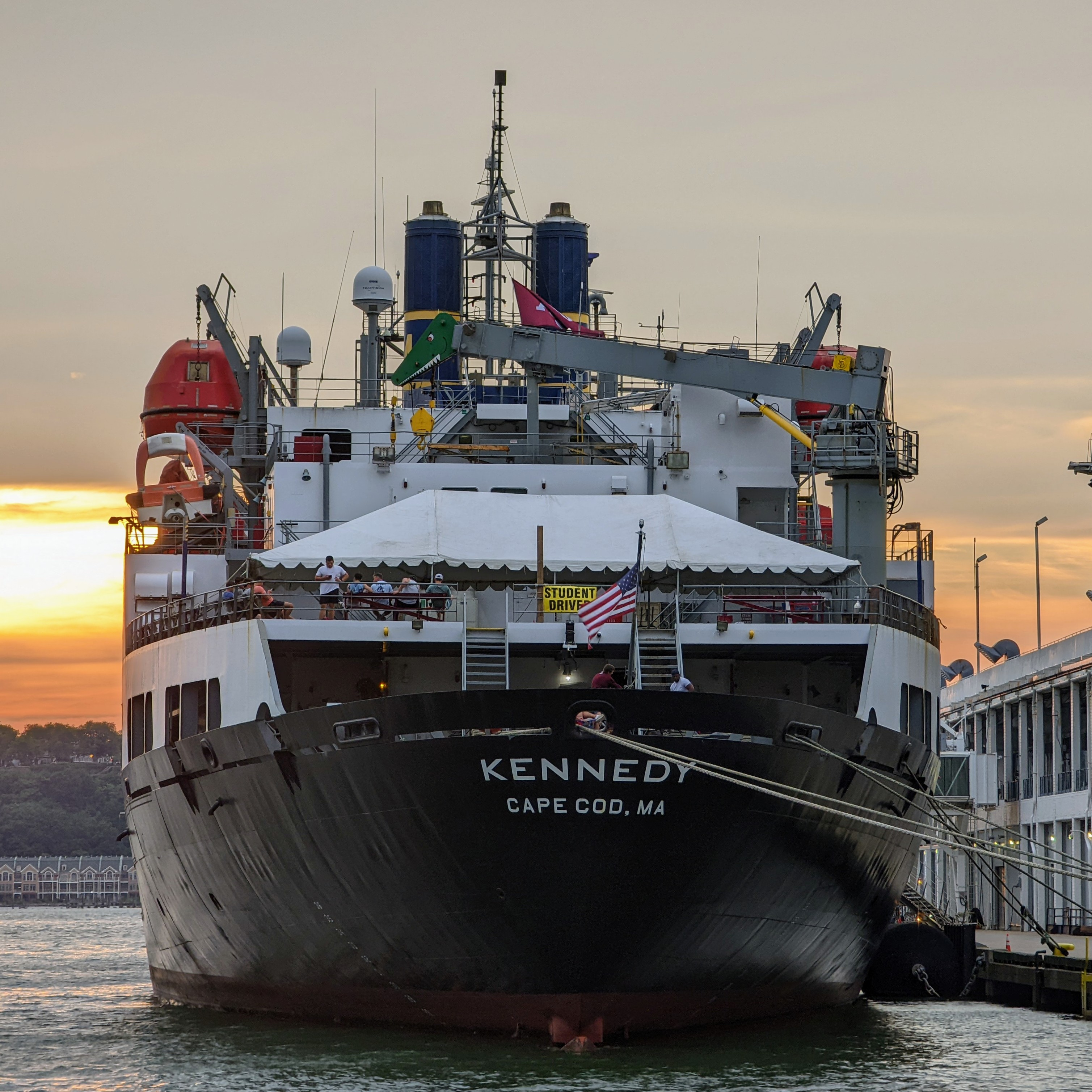
Kennedy in New York in 2022

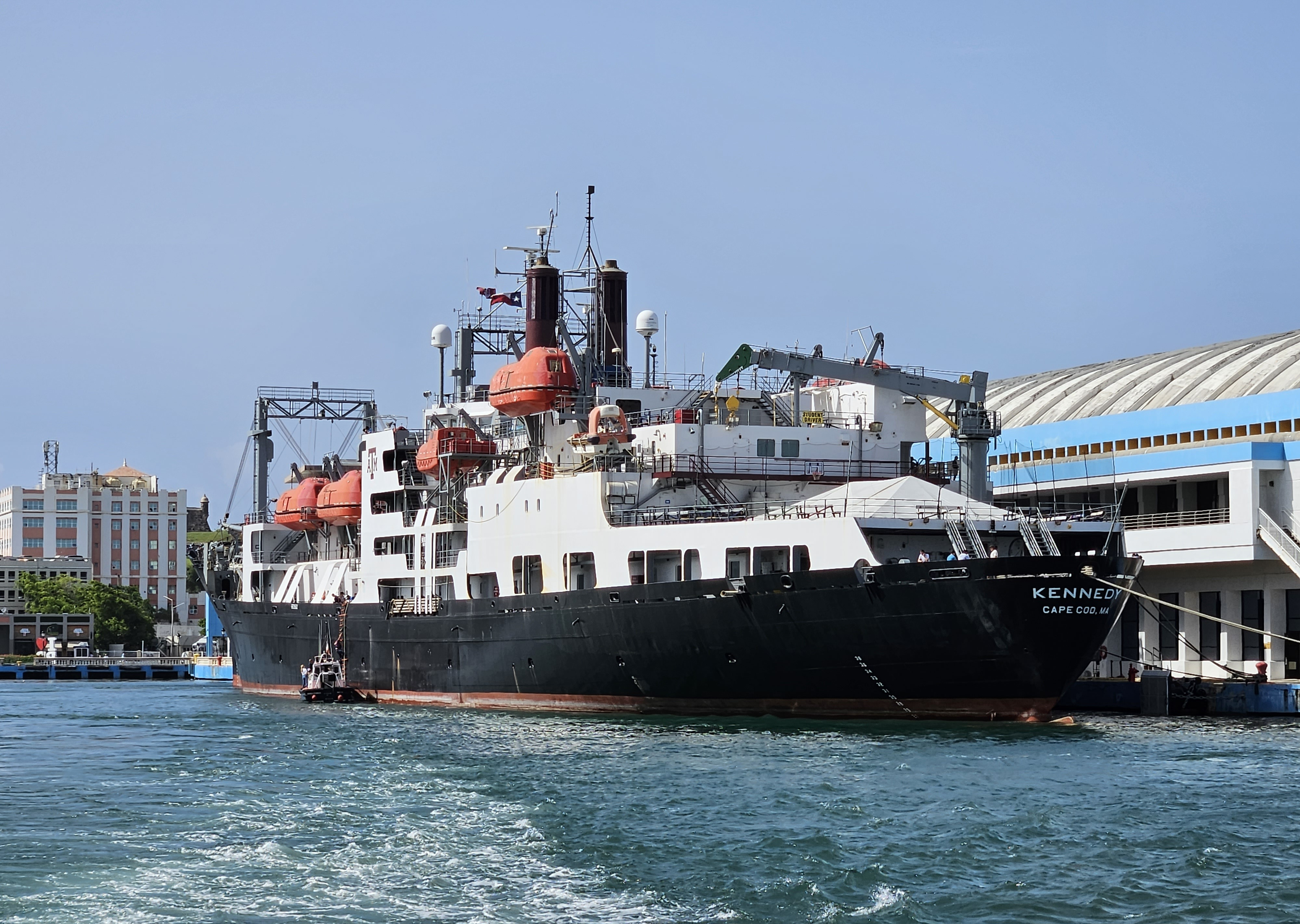
Kennedy in Texas A&M insignia moored to Pier 4 (cruise terminal) with pilot disembarking in San Juan Harbor, San Juan, Puerto Rico (July 2023)
