= Louise Lykes-class freighter =

Series of American freighters

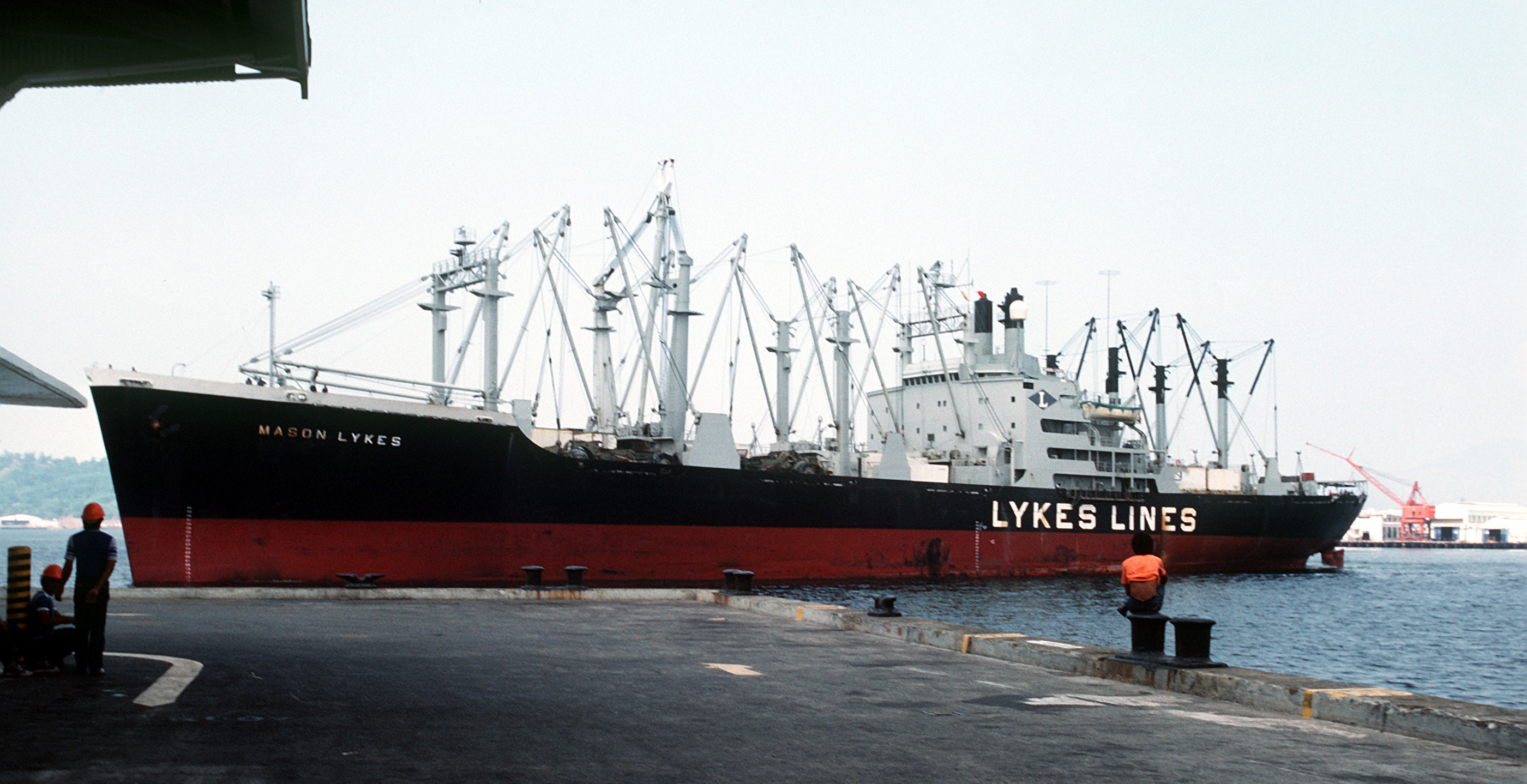
- Mason Lykes pulling into Subic Bay in 1982 while operated by Military Sealift Command.

Class overview
- Operators: Lykes Line; Military Sea Transportation Service; Military Sealift Command; US Maritime Administration; Afram Line; Massachusetts Maritime Academy; Texas A&M University
- Preceded by: Mariner-class freighter
- Cost: $US12 million
- Built: 1964–1968
- Planned: 14
- Completed: 12
- Active: 1
- Laid up: 1
- Lost: 2 (before completion)

General characteristics
- Type: Break-bulk freighters
- Tonnage: GT: 11,420 short tons (10,360 t); NT: 6,602 short tons (5,989 t)
- Length: LBP: 514 ft (157 m); OA: 540 ft (160 m)
- Beam: 76 ft (23 m)
- Draft: 32 ft (9.8 m)
- Installed power: 15,500 shaft horsepower (11,600 kilowatts)
- Propulsion: 2 × boilers; 1 × steam turbine; 1 × propeller
- Speed: 20 knots (37 km/h; 23 mph)
- Crew: 38

The Louise Lykes class, advertised as Gulf-Far East Clippers and assigned the design designation C4-S-66a, was a series of break bulk and general cargo freighters built in the mid-1960s. The ships were ordered as a result an attempt to modernize and bolster the American merchant marine. Lykes Line ordered the ships to replace the company's aged World War II-era fleet and to take advantage of governmental discounts on domestic ship building. While a dozen were planned, two ships were sunk at the Avondale Shipyard by Hurricane Betsy and were subsequently replaced by sister ships with identical names. The design was based on the earlier Mariner-class freighter and the class represented some of the last break-bulk ships built before the rise in containerization.

After all of the ships entered service by 1968, they were immediately used to supply the American war effort in Vietnam and charted to the US government. Over the next decade, the ships carried goods throughout the world, primarily in the Pacific Ocean. Several of the ships were again charted to the government for various periods in the 1980s for use as prepositioning ships and several others were sold off. By 1994, Lykes Line went bankrupt and most of the ships were scrapped. The exception were five vessels purchased by the US Maritime Administration in 1985 that were laid up for future military use. These ships, renamed after capes and referred to as the Cape B class, participated in the Gulf War before they were mothballed. Of the five mothballed ships, three have been broken up. TS Kennedy, a training ship at Texas A&M University, is the only vessel in the class still in operation after she was reactivated while laid up. Aside from Kennedy, Cape Bover is the only other ship that has not yet scrapped.

== Development ==
=== Shipbuilding incentives ===
Traditionally, the US government subsidized shipping companies to ensure a fleet of civilian merchant ships could be called upon in the event of a war. These ships would serve as part of the merchant marine to carry both troops and supplies to the frontlines. However, the introduction of nuclear warfare led to concerns if a large merchant fleet would be useful in future conflicts. Government support for the companies were reduced, and the merchant marine declined between the end of World War II and 1960. High operating costs, especially for wages, put American firms at a disadvantage compared to international competitors who operated at substantially cheaper rates. Between the end of World War II and the 1960s, the number of American merchant ships shrank, domestic merchant shipbuilding slowed down, and foreign-flagged vessels began to carry more American goods. Major shipping lines felt that the government left them to fail as the domestic industry was demoralized and concerned for its long-term future. In an attempt to shore up the merchant fleet and ensure a modern merchant marine, Congress attempted to reverse the trend by introducing a nation-wide ship building program. The plan called for 300 ships built between 1960 and 1975 at a cost of US$4.5 billion. Half of the cost would be paid by the government, while the rest would be paid by shipping companies.

=== Lykes Lines modernization ===
Concurrently, the Lykes Brothers Steamship Company, better known as Lykes Line, was one of the largest shipping lines in the United States. In 1950, it operated a fleet of 51 vessels composed of aging World War II-era C-1, C-2, and C-3 ships. Eight years later, the company began to modernize and planned to replace the entire fleet. The project was estimated to cost half a billion dollars to build 50 ships, so the company went public to raise the needed funds. Lykes Lines efforts' were a part of the 300-ship construction effort, and half the cost of each ship was paid for by the government. The first part of the project was the construction of 21 Gulf Pride-class cargo liners that were delivered between 1952 and 1955. Before the entire Gulf Pride-class had been delivered, the line began planning for the next-generation class of ships. With steady demand for bulk shipments, the company was interested in building a dozen freighters that could carry both general and break-bulk cargo. It branded the new ships as, "Gulf-Far East Clippers" to highlight the planned vessel's high speeds and primary area of operation in the Pacific Ocean and Gulf of Mexico.

== Design ==
The US Maritime Administration (MARAD) was tasked with overseeing the shipbuilding effort and to both maintain and grow the merchant marine. The Administration emphasized technologically advanced ships and invested into new methods of naval architecture and ship design. It operated a classification system for each ship design that was broken into four values. The first value consisted of a letter to denote the type of vessel and a number to indicate size, with one being the smallest. It was followed by a letter that represented the design's propulsion, with a single 'S' indicating the vessel was fitted with a single screw ship powered by a steam engine. That value was followed by another combination of numbers and letters to indicate the specific design and revision. The dozen freighters for Lykes Line was given the code C4-S-66a.

The C4-S-66a design was based on the earlier Mariner-class (C4-S-1a) freighters, which was developed by the US Maritime Commission and Bethlehem Shipbuilding Corporation. The design was intended to serve as fast, 20-knot (37 km/h; 23 mph) merchant ships that could outrun submarines; 35 were ordered at the start of the Korean War. The program was the first, and only, American effort to develop a standardized cargo ship design after World War II. In comparison, C4-S-66a featured a similar sized beam but a shorter length and draft, hence the design's nickname of being a, "Mini-Mariner".

=== Characteristics ===
The ships had an overall length of 540 feet (160 m), a length between perpendiculars of 514 feet (157 m), beam of 76 feet (23 m), and a draft of 32 feet (9.8 m). The vessels had a lightship (empty) displacement of 7,178 short tons (6,512 t), a deadweight total of 13,808 short tons (12,526 t), and rated to have a gross register tonnage of 11,420 short tons (10,360 t), and a net register tonnage of 6,602 short tons (5,989 t). They had a bale capacity of 742,282 cubic feet (21,019.1 m^{3}), a capacity of 31,960 cubic feet (905 m^{3}) for liquid cargo, were crewed by 38 sailors, and could carry four passengers.

Two oil-fired, bent-tube, twin-drum marine-type boilers produced 160,000 pounds (73,000 kg) of steam an hour at 600 pounds per square inch (4,100 kPa) and 850 °F (454 °C). The steam entered a Westinghouse cross-compound steam turbine that could develop 12,500 shaft horsepower (9,300 kilowatts) at 92 revolutions per minute (RPM) and a maximum of 15,500 shaft horsepower (11,600 kilowatts) at 102 RPM. The engine turned a single four-bladed propeller that was 21 feet 9 inches (6.63 m) in diameter to reach the designed top speed of 20 knots (37 km/h; 23 mph). Electrical power was provided by two 870 horsepower (650 kW) generators. The turbine also drove two axillary generators, and further electricity could have been provided by a diesel-powered emergency generator.

=== Arrangement ===
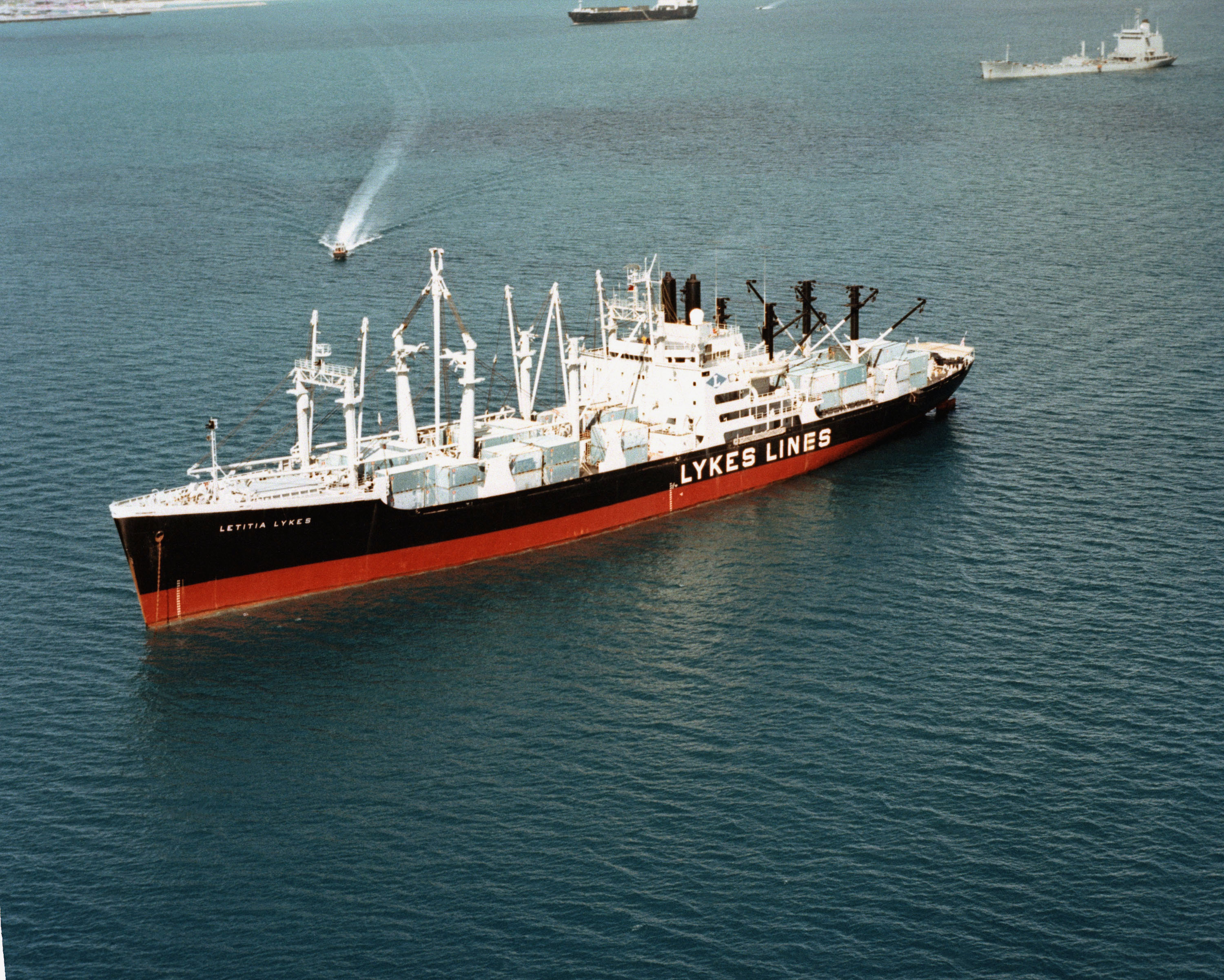
Letitia Lykes in 1984.

The ships had six cargo holds: four were located forward of the superstructure, and two astern. Each hold was fitted with a remotely operated hydraulic hatch. There was one heavy-lift boom fitted between the second and third hold, along with several mast booms attached to both sides of the superstructure. The main deck hosted the galley, two dining rooms, recreation rooms, and crew quarters. The cabin deck consisted of two passenger staterooms, radio room, radio operator's cabin, a room for cadets, along with the captain's cabin, office, and lounge. The officers had their recreation room and staterooms on the boat deck. Both the upper and lower tween deck lacked sheer to allow easy access to cargo. To save cost, the interior finishings were intended to be low-maintenance and consisted of vinyl tile on interior decks and melamine siding on bulkheads. To reduce wear on the ship's exterior, a coating of inorganic zinc was applied in lieu of a coat of paint, which gave the appearance that the ships were unfinished and unpainted.

== Service history ==
=== Construction ===
Lykes Line invited shipyards to bid on the project on 27 December 1962, and awarded a contract to Avondale Shipyard on 4 April 1963 at a cost of $12 million per freighter. Work on the lead ship, Louise Lykes, began on 16 January 1964. That day, President Lyndon Johnson remotely addressed an audience of 150 gathered in Louisiana for the keel-laying ceremony. From the White House, he pressed a button that activated a welding machine in the shipyard and proclaimed, “The future becomes today,” while praising the vessel's modern design. The New York Times hailed Louise Lykes as the nation's most mechanized cargo ship. Nine months later, the ship was sponsored and launched by Luci Johnson, the president's daughter. The event also marked the 100th ship launched as part of the nation-wide effort with a decade remaining until the end date. Like the rest of the ships operated by Lykes Line, the ships were named after members of the Lykes family and featured the Lykes suffix.

==== Hurricane Betsy ====
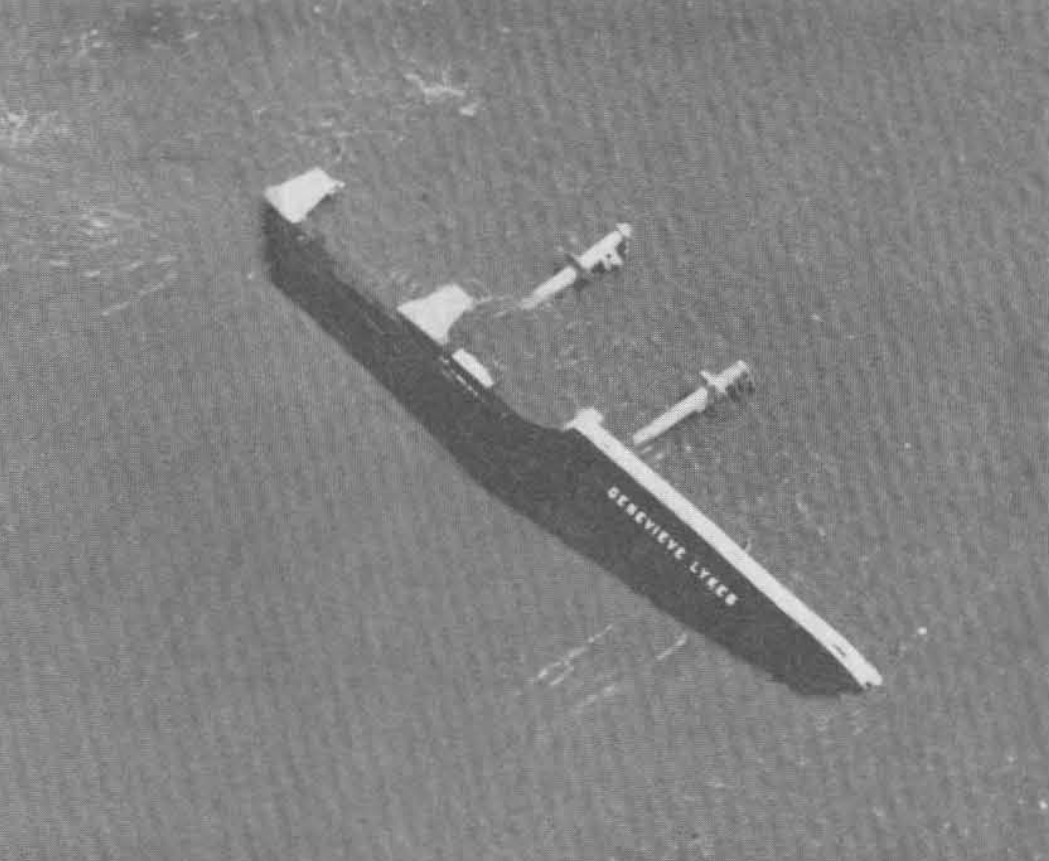
The hull of the uncompleted Genevieve Lykes after she was sunk by Hurricane Betsy in the Mississippi River. Underneath was her sunken sister ship Letitia Lykes.

Construction was in full swing by September 1965 when southern Louisiana was struck by Hurricane Betsy, a category 4 storm. It made landfall on 9 September with windspeeds up to 140 miles per hour (230 km/h) and large storm surges. The storm was the most expensive Atlantic hurricane to date and caused $1 billion in damages. Like the rest of New Orleans, Avondale Shipyard was devastated. The yard was nearing completion on five ships of the class when the storm pulled each ship free of their docks. Ruth Lykes was beached miles away from the shipyard, Mason Lykes was found on top of a levee, and Elizabeth Lykes was found in the Mississippi River with large gashes in her side and the dry dock she was in sunk. Letitia Lykes had likewise broken free and was found sunken in 110 feet (34 m) of water with the overturned Genevieve Lykes on top of her. The propped up Genevieve Lykes settled in a shallower 60-foot (18 m)-deep portion of the river and had a section of her bow visible from the surface. Hundreds of other vessels in the river were either damaged or lost, and repairs were delayed as the shipyard was unable to locate its tugboats to recover the beached ships. Eventually, all but the sunken duo were towed back to the shipyard and repaired. In 1966, the wrecks of Genevieve Lykes and Letitia Lykes were sold off to be scrapped, although the effort was complicated by risks that Genevieve Lykes could move or sink further as crews worked. The names of both ships were reused in late 1966 when the shipyard built two more identical freighters as replacements.

=== Merchant service ===
Louise Lykes was the first to be delivered to Lykes Brothers in 1965. Five ships were delivered in both 1966 and 1967 while the second Genevieve Lykes and Letitia Lykes arrived in 1968. The fast ships cut long voyages down by weeks compared to some of the company's older vessels and operated in the Pacific, Gulf of Mexico, Eastern US Coast, Mediterranean, and Black Sea.

Automation on board the freighters, particularly Elizabeth Lykes, lead to a dispute between Lykes Line and a labor union of engineersknown as the Marine Engineers' Beneficial Association. While the company wanted the ships to be staffed by five engineers, the union insisted on six to avoid burnout among crewmembers. After Elizabeth Lykes laid idle for about 100 days, a temporary agreement for six was made. The dispute occurred during a shortage of American engineers and the union's concerns over modern automated ships with reduced crew requirements.

==== Vietnam War ====
Following the Cuban Revolution, Lykes Line's business was disrupted by the new Cuban government that nationalized property and rejected foreign firms. As a result, the company suspended sailings to the island and its Caribbean operations were devastated. At the same time, the dozen Louise Lykes-class and 26 James Lykes-class freighters were entering service, which meant the company had too many ships and not enough cargo. The company initially planned to charge less profitable rates to stimulate business, but was relieved by the Vietnam War as the US government needed to transport a large amount of supplies to South Vietnam. Initially, the government took a laissez-faire approach in the civilian market, and allowed companies such as Lykes Line to carry military equipment in the same manner as traditional cargo. The ships visited ports including Saigon, but a logistical backlog left many ships idle, which delayed schedules and impacted other shipments throughout the region. The companies were agitated by the delays and charged large fees to the government and began to resist further trips to Saigon. The government soon changed tactics and instead began to directly charter vessels to supply the war effort, especially those from companies who were fiscally harmed by recently introduced US embargo against Cuba. The Louise Lykes class were chartered at a rate of $4,399 a day to the Military Sea Transportation Service, one of the highest rates for bulk carriers and double the rate paid for World War II-era Liberty ships. Several of the vessels, such as Mason Lykes, forewent traditional trade and sailed directly to Vietnam on their maiden voyages.

Throughout the decade, the global shipping industry rapidly embraced containerization. The previous standard of break-bulk shipping–where cargo was unloaded in pallets for repackaging–was slow and labor-intensive. By introducing standardized cargo containers, stored goods could be directly loaded onto trucks without further work. While the first container ships were converted from existing vessels, purpose-built ships were better at the task and grew in number, ultimately replacing break-bulk freighters worldwide. The class was a part of the last generation of break-bulk freighters before the shift and was the end of the design's evolution.

=== Later service ===
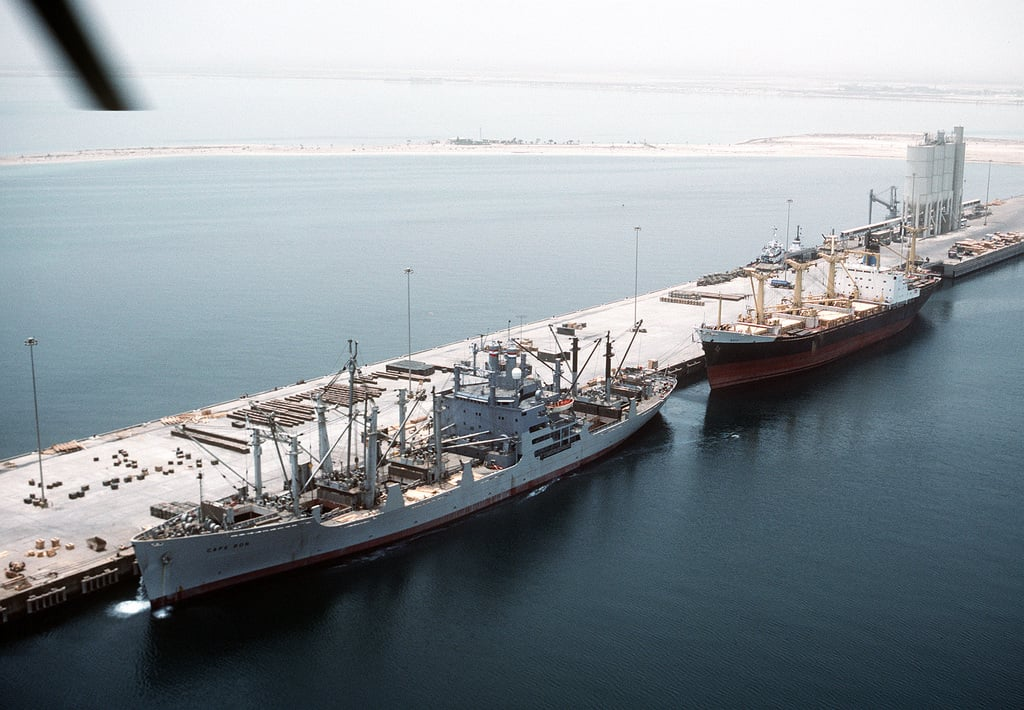
Cape Bon (bottom) in Saudi Arabia, preparing to return to the US following Operation Desert Storm in 1991.

In 1979, Letita Lykes docked in Shanghai: the first American vessel to do so in three decades. Her arrival was a part of an international business deal and she carried a symbolic cargo of various items, including gloves, feathers, and canned jellyfish. The feat was repeated in the United States by the Chinese freighter Liu Lin Hai. The exchange was intended to normalize trade between the two nations and occurred during Sino-American rapprochement.

Throughout the 1980s, ships of the class were individually charted by Military Sealift Command to supply various military instillations throughout the Pacific. In one such sailing, Letita Lykes was docked in Diego Garcia and assigned to Preposition Group One—a flotilla of ships loaded with equipment and stationed around the world that could rapidly respond in a crisis. On 8 May 1985, she was loaded with equipment to fully supply four Army hospitals when crewmembers heard a hissing noise. Soon after, a container bulged and sparks shot out of one end before exploding. An oxygen bottle stored inside had detonated, which started fires throughout the ship that fed off pure oxygen. The explosions shot shrapnel thousands of feet away as 126 tons of bottles detonated over ten hours. Nearby ships began to evacuate and feared that an ammunition ship was about to explode. The fire consumed containers holding chemicals such as chloroform, acids, propane, and various poisons before local firefighting crews got the situation under control. Everything near hold #3 was destroyed, but the ship was able to be repaired by July. Following an investigation, the incident was blamed on the crew's utter lack of firefighting training and improper documentation of the cargo.

In 1987, Stella Lykes and Mallory Lykes were sold to Afram Lines and renamed Tampa Bay and Galveston Bay, respectively. By the 1990s, governmental subsidies for shipping lines continuously decreased, and Lykes Line was pushed to fiscal ruin. The company only operated a fleet of 14 ships, and in 1994, struck a deal with MARAD. In exchange for further subsidies to support Stella Lykes for another two and a half years, funds for Louise Lykes, Elizabeth Lykes, Genevieve Lykes, and other vessels were cut short as the ships had already reached their 25-year long service life. The company declared bankruptcy a year later.

=== Government layup ===
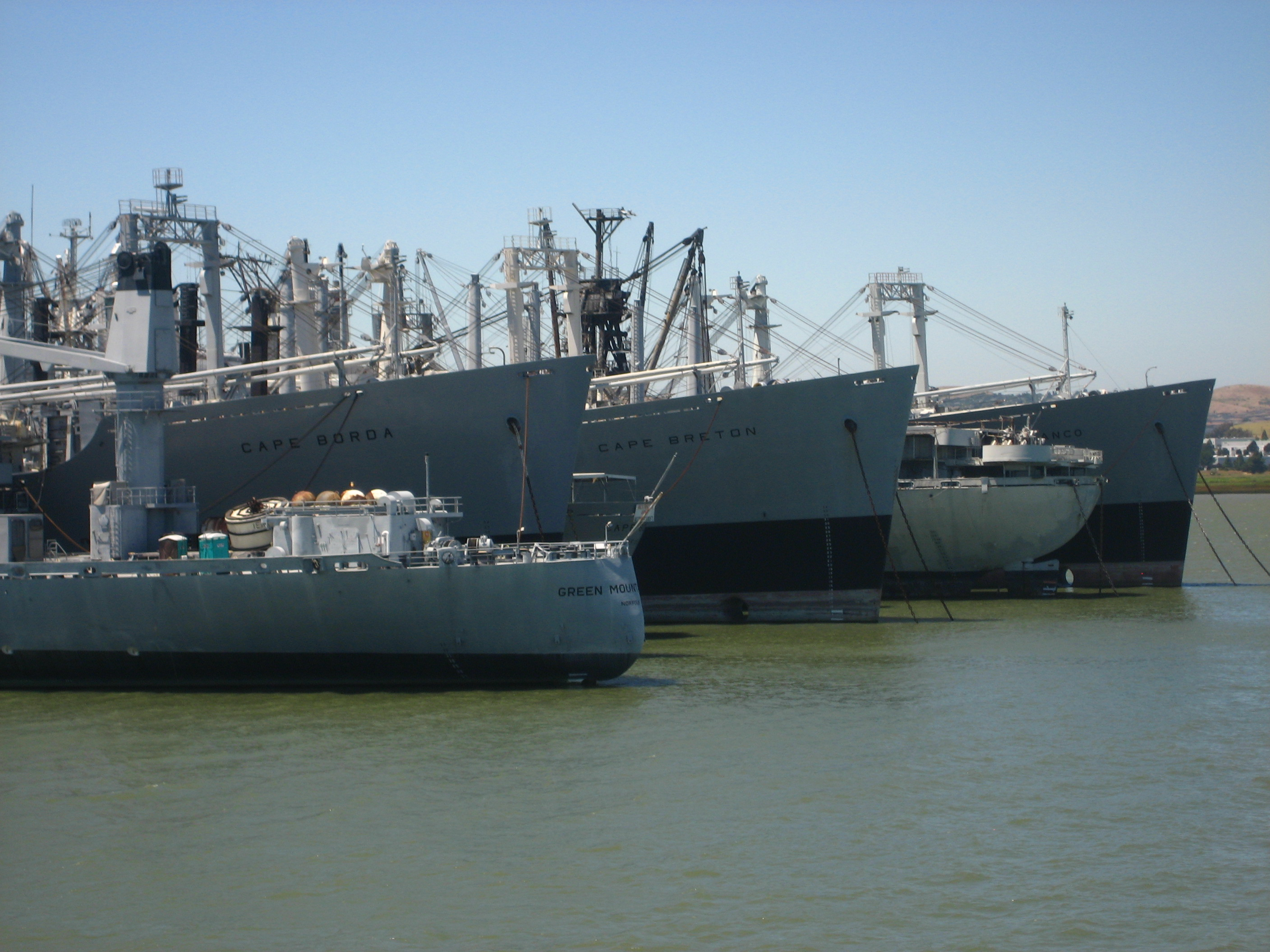
Cape Borda, Cape Breton, Cape Blanco, and other vessels of the reserve fleet laid up alongside each other in Suisun Bay in 2011.

In 1985, MARAD acquired five ships in the class and renamed them after capes; Frederick Lykes became Cape Bover, Howell Lykes became Cape Borda, Dolly Turman became Cape Breton, and Velma Lykes was renamed Cape Bon. Collectively, the ships became known as the Cape B class. The ships were laid up in off Alameda, California, and assigned to the Ready Reserve Force—a group of laid up civilian ships that could be rapidly deployed in the event of an emergency. Over the next several years, the ships were individually deployed for small exercises and were maintained to ensure that they would be ready in the event that they were needed. The first large-scale activation of the force was during Operation Desert Storm to carry military supplies to Ad Dammam, Saudi Arabia, in support for the invasion of Iraq. The reserve fleet carried about one fifth of dry cargo sealifted during the war, or about 750,000 short tons of material. While in service, the ships were operated and crewed by Military Sealift Command.

In 1998, the Massachusetts Maritime Academy discovered significant corrosion onboard their training ship TS Patriot State, and declared her unseaworthy. Instead of an expensive effort to repair the ship, President Bill Clinton authorized funds to retrofit Cape Bon into a training ship. The ship was selected as it was in the best condition out of the laid up vessels. Machinery was removed and used on land in the academy's marine engineering laboratories, the superstructure was rebuilt and enlarged, cargo holds repurposed, and the ship was named Enterprise. Later renamed Kennedy, she was transferred to Texas A&M University in 2023.

By the 2000s, the remaining vessels under MARAD control were mothballed and assigned to the Suisun Bay Reserve Fleet. In 2009, the US federal government was sued by local organizations that alleged the old ships polluted the bay and were in violation of several environmental protection laws. An outcome was reached in 2017, with MARAD agreeing to remove all vessels deemed obsolete and send them to Brownsville, Texas, for scrapping. The agency admitted that the action was overdue and that many of the ships were so dilapidated that they could never be reactivated. An exception was Cape Bover, which is retained to source spare parts for Kennedy.

== Ships in class ==
Original Name	Renamed	Keel laid	Launched	Completed	Fate	Reference
Louise Lykes	Louise	16 January 1964	5 September 1964	20 August 1965	Broken up 1995	
Elizabeth Lykes		25 March 1964	31 October 1964	29 January 1966	Broken up 1995	
Ruth Lykes	Ruth	23 June 1964	9 January 1965	1 June 1966	Broken up 1994	
Letitia Lykes (I)				–	Sunk by Hurricane Betsy, 1965	
Letitia Lykes (II)	Letitia	28 April 1966	29 October 1966	26 January 1968	Broken up 1994	
Genevieve Lykes (I)		16 November 1964	30 April 1965	–	Sunk by Hurricane Betsy, 1965	
Genevieve Lykes (II)		17 June 1966	17 December 1966	9 April 1968	Broken up 1995	
Mason Lykes	Cape Blanco	21 January 1965	10 July 1965	September 1966	Broken up 2016	
Mallory Lykes	Galveston Bay, Pioneer P.	18 March 1965	2 October 1965	July 1966	Broken up 1997	
Stella Lykes	Tampa Bay, Tampa	14 May 1965	18 December 1965	1 September 1966	Broken up 1996	
Frederick Lykes	Cape Bover	26 July 1965	12 February 1966	3 February 1967	Laid up	
Howell Lykes	Cape Borda	18 October 1965	16 April 1966	2 May 1967	Broken up 2017	
Dolly Turman	Cape Breton	10 January 1966	4 June 1966	15 May 1967	Broken up 2017	
Velma Lykes	Cape Bon, Enterprise, Kennedy	24 February 1966	16 July 1966	15 July 1967	In service	
