= SS Mayaguez =

American container ship (1944–1979)

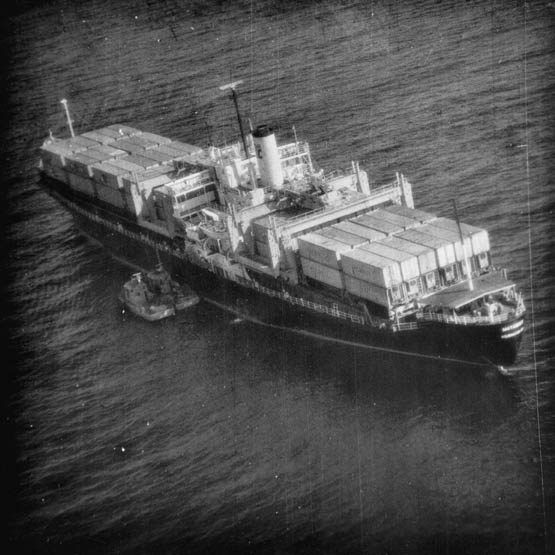
- The Mayaguez under attack by Khmer Rouge gunboats

History

United States
- Commissioned: April 1944
- Decommissioned: 1979
- Identification: IMO number: 5312044
- Fate: Scrapped in 1979

SS Mayaguez was a U.S.-flagged container ship that is best known for its 12 May 1975 seizure by Khmer Rouge forces of Cambodia, which resulted in a confrontation with the United States at the close of the Vietnam War.

== Service history ==
The Mayaguez was first launched in April 1944 as SS White Falcon, a U.S. Maritime Commission C2-S-AJ1 freighter built by North Carolina Shipbuilding Company of Wilmington, North Carolina.

After World War II, the ship was sold to Grace Line and renamed the SS Santa Eliana. Seeking to containerize its coffee bean traffic from Venezuela, in 1960 Grace had the Santa Eliana and her sister ship Santa Leonor lengthened and widened by the Maryland Shipbuilding and Drydock Company and converted into the first U.S.-flagged, all-container ships devoted to foreign trade, with a capacity of 382 containers below-deck plus 94 on-deck. With Grace Line's plans repeatedly frustrated by longshoremen opposition in both Venezuela and New York, the ship was sold in 1964 to the American container line Sea-Land Service and renamed SS Sea, and then SS Mayaguez (named after the city of Mayagüez on the west coast of Puerto Rico) in 1965. Her sister ship was renamed Land and then Ponce (after the city of Ponce on the south coast of Puerto Rico).

In 1967, Sea-Land began regular container service under contract to the Military Sea Transportation Service (MSTS) in support of American forces in Southeast Asia, with the Mayaguez being one of many Sea-Land ships employed. In 1975 the Mayaguez was sailing a regular route: Hong Kong – Sattahip, Thailand – Singapore. On 7 May 1975, about a week after the fall of Saigon, Mayaguez left Hong Kong on what was said to be a routine voyage.

== Capture and recovery ==
The "Mayaguez incident" took place between Democratic Kampuchea (today known as the Kingdom of Cambodia) and the United States from 12 to 15 May 1975, less than a month after the Khmer Rouge took control of the capital Phnom Penh ousting the U.S.-backed Khmer Republic. After the Khmer Rouge seized the ship in a disputed maritime area, the U.S. mounted a hastily-prepared rescue operation. U.S. Marines recaptured the ship and attacked the island of Koh Tang where it was believed, in error, that the crew were being held as hostages. Encountering stronger than expected defenses on Koh Tang, three United States Air Force helicopters were destroyed during the initial assault and the Marines fought a desperate day-long battle with the Khmer Rouge before being evacuated. Mayaguez's crew were released unharmed by the Khmer Rouge shortly after the attack on Koh Tang began.

== Later career ==
Duly retrieved from Khmer Rouge forces, the Mayaguez was taken out of service and eventually scrapped in 1979.

== General and cited references ==
- Cudahy, Brian J. (2006). Box Boats: How Container Ships Changed the World. Fordham University Press. ISBN 978-0-8232-2569-9.
- Levinson, Mark (2006). The Box: How the Shipping Container made the World Smaller and the World Economy Bigger. Princeton University Press. ISBN 978-0-691-13640-0.
- Wetterhahn, Ralph (2002). The Last Battle: The Mayaguez Incident and the End of the Vietnam War. Plume. ISBN 0-452-28333-7.
