= USS Leedstown =

USS Leedstown may refer to the following ships of the United States Navy:

- USS Leedstown (AP-73), was acquired by the US Navy 6 August 1942 and sunk by German bombers near Algiers 9 November 1942
- USS Leedstown (APA-56), was launched 13 February 1943 and decommissioned 7 March 1946
