= TS Patriot State =

U.S. training ship built in 1964

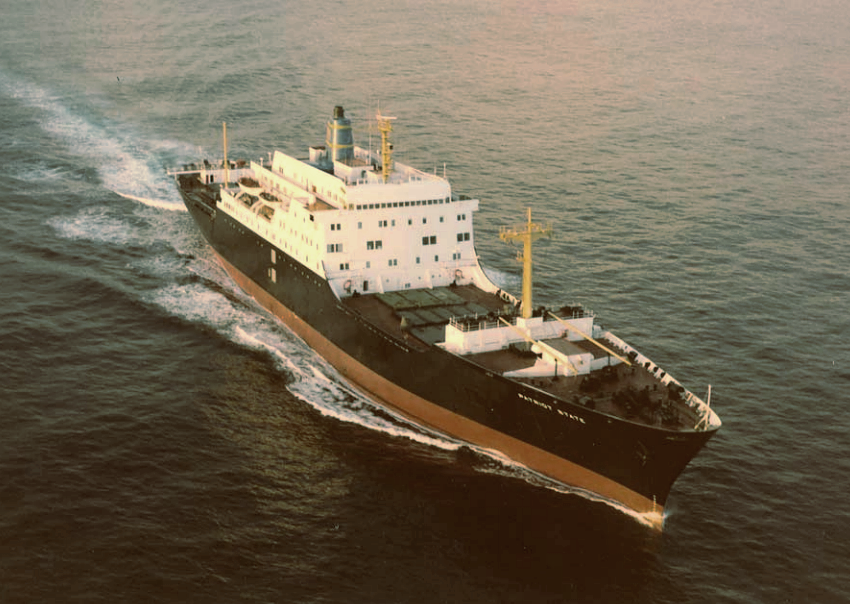
- USTS Patriot State (circa 1990s)

History

United States
- Name: USTS Patriot State
- Owner: U.S. Maritime Administration
- Operator: Massachusetts Maritime Academy
- Builder: Bethlehem Sparrows Point Shipyard, Baltimore, Maryland
- Yard number: 4602
- Way number: 293943
- Launched: 30 July 1963
- Completed: April 7, 1964
- Out of service: 1999
- Stricken: 2011
- Home port: Buzzards Bay, Massachusetts
- Identification: IMO number: 5422409
- Fate: Scrapped
- Notes: ex-Santa Mercedes

General characteristics
- Class & type: C4-S1-49a - Cargo/passenger vessel
- Type: Training Ship/Troopship
- Tonnage: 9,300
- Displacement: 19,799 long tons (20,117 t)
- Length: 546 ft 8 in (166.62 m)
- Beam: 79 ft (24 m)
- Draft: 29 ft 0 in (8.84 m)
- Depth: 48 ft 0 in (14.63 m)
- Propulsion: 2 × Type D steam engines, steam turbines, single screw
- Speed: 20.5 knots (38.0 km/h; 23.6 mph)
- Complement: 50 crew, 648 cadets and faculty
- Armament: None

USTS Patriot State , IMO number 5422409, formerly Santa Mercedes, was a training vessel of the United States Maritime Service. Originally build as a cargo/passenger liner for the Grace Shipping Company, it was later converted to a training vessel for the Massachusetts Maritime Academy.

== Early years ==
Santa Mercedes was built by Bethlehem Steel at its Sparrows Point Shipyard and delivered to the Grace Lines as the last of four cargo/passenger vessels intended to modernize its fleet. These "M" ships also included Santa Magdalena, Santa Mariana, and Santa Maria, and carried up to 125 passengers as well as various break-bulk and container cargo. Santa Mercedes traveled between New York City and the west coast of South America. Due to political instability in South America and depreciating currencies in the region, the shipping service was sold to Prudential Lines in 1969, which operated until 1977 when it sold its assets to Delta Line. Shortly afterwards, all four ships in the class were sold to the Maritime Administration, and in 1984 the Santa Mercedes was laid up at James River, Virginia as part of the Maritime Administration's National Defense Reserve Fleet.

== Government service ==
The Massachusetts Maritime Academy acquired the vessel in 1984 and renamed it Patriot State. It was converted to a training vessel in two stages by the Triple A Shipyard in San Francisco, California and Bender Shipyard in Mobile, Alabama. The cargo handling gear was removed, except for the forward yard and stay rig, and teaching facilities installed. Patriot State entered service as a training ship in the Spring of 1986. Fourteen training cruises from 1986 to 1998, typically lasting around sixty days during the winter, were used to provide cadets with practical experience. Over the ship's service, various improvements were made to the berthing spaces, and controlled superheaters were installed on the boilers to increase the top safe speed of the ship.

In 1998, ultrasonic surveys determined that extensive corrosion in the hull and bulkheads had compromised the seaworthiness of the ship. Extensive repairs would have been necessary, so large portions of its propulsion system were removed by MMA cadets for use as static training aids. The Patriot State was laid up in the James River, Virginia as part of the Maritime Administrations National Defense Reserve Fleet. In 2001, the Cape Bon was moved to Buzzards Bay, MA for preparation to replace TS Patriot State as the Training Ship for the Massachusetts Maritime Academy, and served there until 2023

Patriot State continued to be used by various law enforcement and military services for close-quarter counter-terrorist training exercises while berthed in the James River Reserve Fleet. In 2011 the vessel was formally withdrawn from service and was towed to a scrapyard in Brownsville, Texas. Patriot State II is a National Security Multi-Mission Vessel (NSMV) used by Massachusetts Maritime Academy as a training vessel.
