= SS Santa Paula (1916) =

Coordinates: 17°05′04″N 58°05′00″E

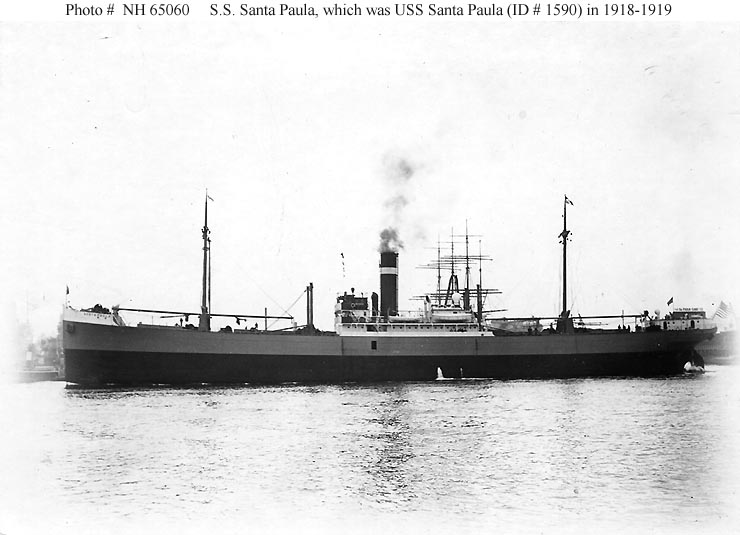
- SS Santa Paula as built by Cramp Shipyard

History

United States
- Name: SS Santa Paula
- Operator: Grace Line (1917, 1919–1925)
- Port of registry: New York City
- Builder: William Cramp & Sons, Philadelphia
- Yard number: 439
- Launched: 20 March 1916
- Acquired: April 1917
- Identification: Official number 2214901
- Fate: Sold in 1925 100 years ago
- Name: USS Santa Paula ID-1590
- Operator: US Navy (1918–1919)
- Acquired: August 14, 1918
- Fate: Returned to owners August 21, 1919
- Operator: American-Hawaiian Steamship Company (1925–1943)
- Acquired: 1925
- Fate: Sunk by torpedo June 3, 1943

General characteristics
- Type: Freighter
- Tonnage: 6,415 grt
- Length: 417.5 ft (127 m)
- Beam: 54.8 ft (16.7 m)
- Installed power: 1 quadruple expansion
- Propulsion: Single screw
- Speed: 12 knots (22 km/h; 14 mph)

SS Santa Paula (later SS Montanan) was a freighter of the Grace Line and later the American-Hawaiian Steamship Company. The vessel also saw military transport service during both World Wars.

Built at William Cramp & Sons Shipbuilding Company in Philadelphia, the vessel was completed in April 1917. She was named Santa Paula and entered commercial service for the Grace Line.

After the United States entered World War I, the vessel was requisitioned by the US Navy in August 1918 and became the commissioned USS Santa Paula ID-1590. She was assigned to the Naval Overseas Transportation Service to carry cargo for United States forces fighting in France. She only completed one round-trip voyage, from New York to Marseille and back, with 8,340 tons of general cargo, before the war ended.

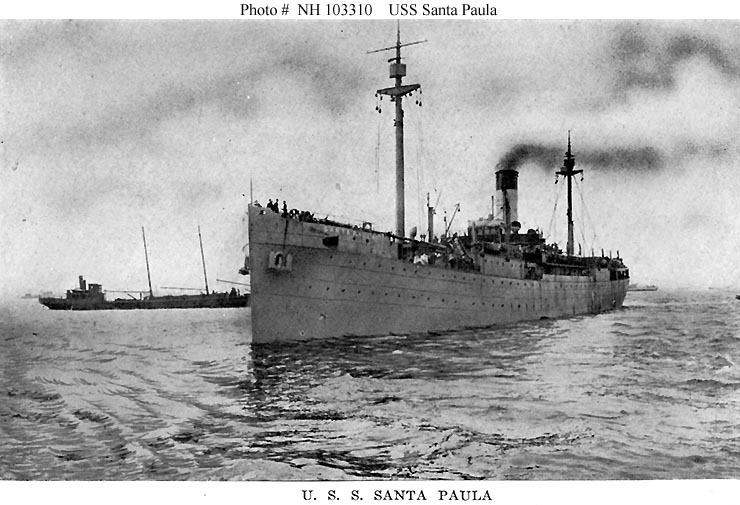
Navy Transport Santa Paula in 1919.

Santa Paula again sailed to Marseille between 21 November and 14 January 1919, with supplies for US forces still in France. She was then transferred to the Cruiser and Transport Force. In late January, American troops home from France and would make four more round-trip voyages from New York to Brest Bordeaux and St. Nazaire between 22 March and 1 August. When the last of these voyages ended at New York, the ship was turned over to the custody of the Commandant, 3d Naval District, and was decommissioned on 21 August 1919 and simultaneously returned to the Grace Line.

Santa Paula resumed service for the Grace Line. By 1925, the Intracoastal service had become unprofitable. However, the American-Hawaiian Steamship Company sought to expand its Pacific service and negotiated the purchase of six ships, including Santa Paula, from the Grace Line. She was renamed SS Montanan (American-Hawaiian's first SS Montanan had been sunk in World War I) and entered Pacific intercoastal service for her new owners. During her inter-war service, she carried goods from Los Angeles and San Francisco to the Canal Zone and also made coastal voyages.

Montanan was sailing as a civilian transport vessel in the Arabian Sea on June 3, 1943. She was sunk 150 nautical miles (280 km; 170 mi) south of Masirah Island, Oman, by the Imperial Japanese Navy submarine I-27 At 0735 a torpedo struck on the starboard side of the No. 2 hold, igniting the bunker fuel tanks and sending flames up the foremast. Just seven minutes later the ship sank bow first. Master Charles Harry McGahan was killed along with four other crew members and two of the Armed Guard. Survivors either jumped overboard or boarded her four lifeboats. Survivors in Life Boat No. 2 sailed for two days before rescue by the dhow Naranpasha. They were transferred to the armed trawler HMIS Baroda and arrived at Port Okha on June 11, 1943. Survivors in the other boats reached Masirah Island.
