= HMS Slinger (1917) =

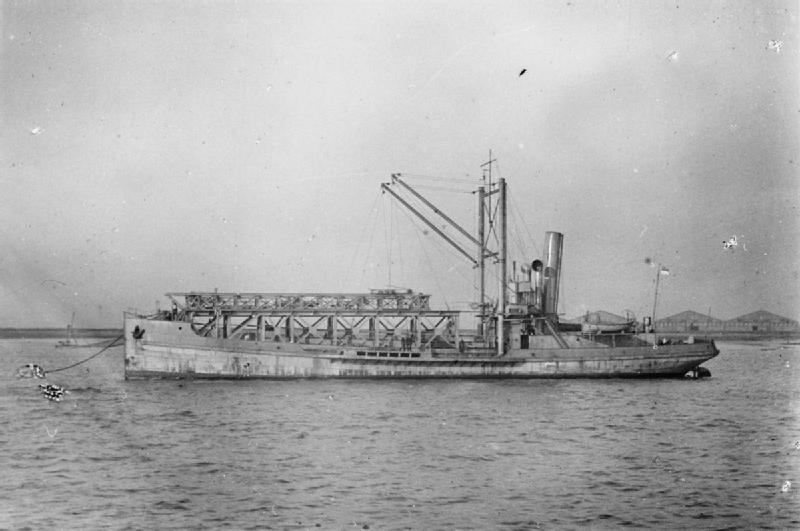

History

United Kingdom
- Name: HMS Slinger
- Builder: Lobnitz and Company, Limited
- Launched: 3 September 1917
- Acquired: 1917
- Commissioned: 1917
- Fate: Sold 16 October 1919

History
- Name: Niki (1920–1937); Lingfield (1937–1941)
- Operator: Boyazides L, Brother & Company (1920–1934); Valsamakis & Company (1934–1937); Nomikos Petros (1937); Finchley Steamship Company (1937–1941)
- Acquired: 1920
- Fate: Sunk in collision 17 October 1941

General characteristics (as HMS Slinger)
- Tonnage: 875 GRT

General characteristics (As commercial cargo ship)
- Tonnage: 1,002 GRT
- Length: 195 ft 4 in (59.54 m)
- Beam: 35 ft 5 in (10.80 m)
- Draught: 14 ft 5 in (4.39 m)
- Propulsion: 1 × 3-cylinder triple expansion steam engine; 1 shaft, 1,030 ihp (770 kW)
- Speed: 10 knots (19 km/h; 12 mph)

HMS Slinger was an experimental catapult ship operated by the Royal Navy during the First World War. After Royal Navy service from 1917 to 1919, she operated as a commercial cargo ship under the names SS Niki and SS Lingfield from 1920 until she sank in 1941.

== Royal Navy service ==
Constructed as a hopper barge, HMS Slinger was purchased from her builder, Lobnitz and Company, Limited of Renfrew, Scotland, prior to completion. Intending to use her as a test bed for the shipborne launching of aircraft, the Royal Navy fitted her with a 60-foot (18.25-meter) compressed air catapult. HMS Slinger operated Fairey Campania and Short 310 floatplanes during 1917 and 1918.

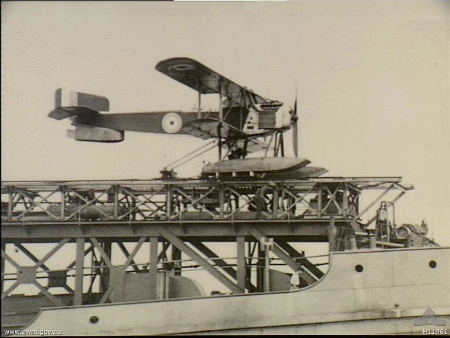
A Fairey Campania seaplane aboard HMS Slinger.

Slinger was sold on 16 October 1919.

== Later career ==
After her sale, the ship was converted into a merchant cargo ship. She entered commercial service under the Greek flag with Boyazides L, Brother & Company in 1920 as SS Niki. Niki was sold to Valsamakis & Company in 1934 and to Nomikos Petros in 1937, remaining under Greek ownership and registry throughout. On 28 July 1920, Niki arrived leaking at Liverpool and was beached at Tranmere. Cheshire. She was refloated, repaired, and returned to service.

Niki was sold to Valsamakis & Company in 1934 and to Nomikos Petros in 1937, remaining under Greek ownership and registry throughout. Later in 1937, Niki was sold to the Finchley Steamship Company and, under British registry, was renamed SS Lingfield. Lingfield continued to operate as a commercial cargo ship until 17 October 1941, when she collided with another vessel in the North Sea off the coast of Norfolk, England, and sank.
