= Catapult =

Pre-gunpowder projectile-launching device

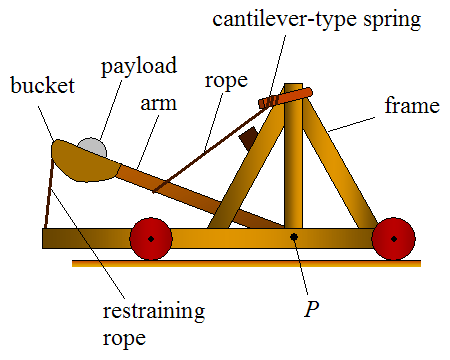
Basic diagram of an onager, a type of catapult

A catapult is a ballistic device used to launch a projectile at a great distance without the aid of gunpowder or other propellants – particularly various types of ancient and medieval siege engines. A catapult uses the sudden release of stored potential energy to propel its payload. Most convert tension or torsion energy that was more slowly and manually built up within the device before release, via springs, bows, twisted rope, elastic, or any of numerous other materials and mechanisms which allow the catapult to launch a projectile such as rocks, cannon balls, or debris.

During wars in the ancient times, the catapult was usually known to be the strongest heavy weaponry. In modern times the term can apply to devices ranging from a simple hand-held implement (also called a "slingshot") to a mechanism for launching aircraft from a ship.

The earliest catapults date to at least the 7th century BC, with King Uzziah of Judah recorded as equipping the walls of Jerusalem with machines that shot "great stones". Catapults are mentioned in Yajurveda under the name "Jyah" in chapter 30, verse 7. In the 5th century BC the mangonel appeared in ancient China, a type of traction trebuchet and catapult. Early uses were also attributed to Ajatashatru of Magadha in his 5th century BC war against the Licchavis. Greek catapults were invented in the early 4th century BC, being attested by Diodorus Siculus as part of the equipment of a Greek army in 399 BC, and subsequently used at the siege of Motya in 397 BC.

== Etymology ==
The word 'catapult' comes from the Latin 'catapulta', which in turn comes from the Greek Ancient Greek: καταπέλτης (katapeltēs), itself from κατά (kata), "downwards" and πάλλω (pallō), "to toss, to hurl". Catapults were invented by the ancient Greeks and in ancient India where they were used by the Magadhan King Ajatashatru around the early to mid 5th century BC.

== Greek and Roman catapults ==
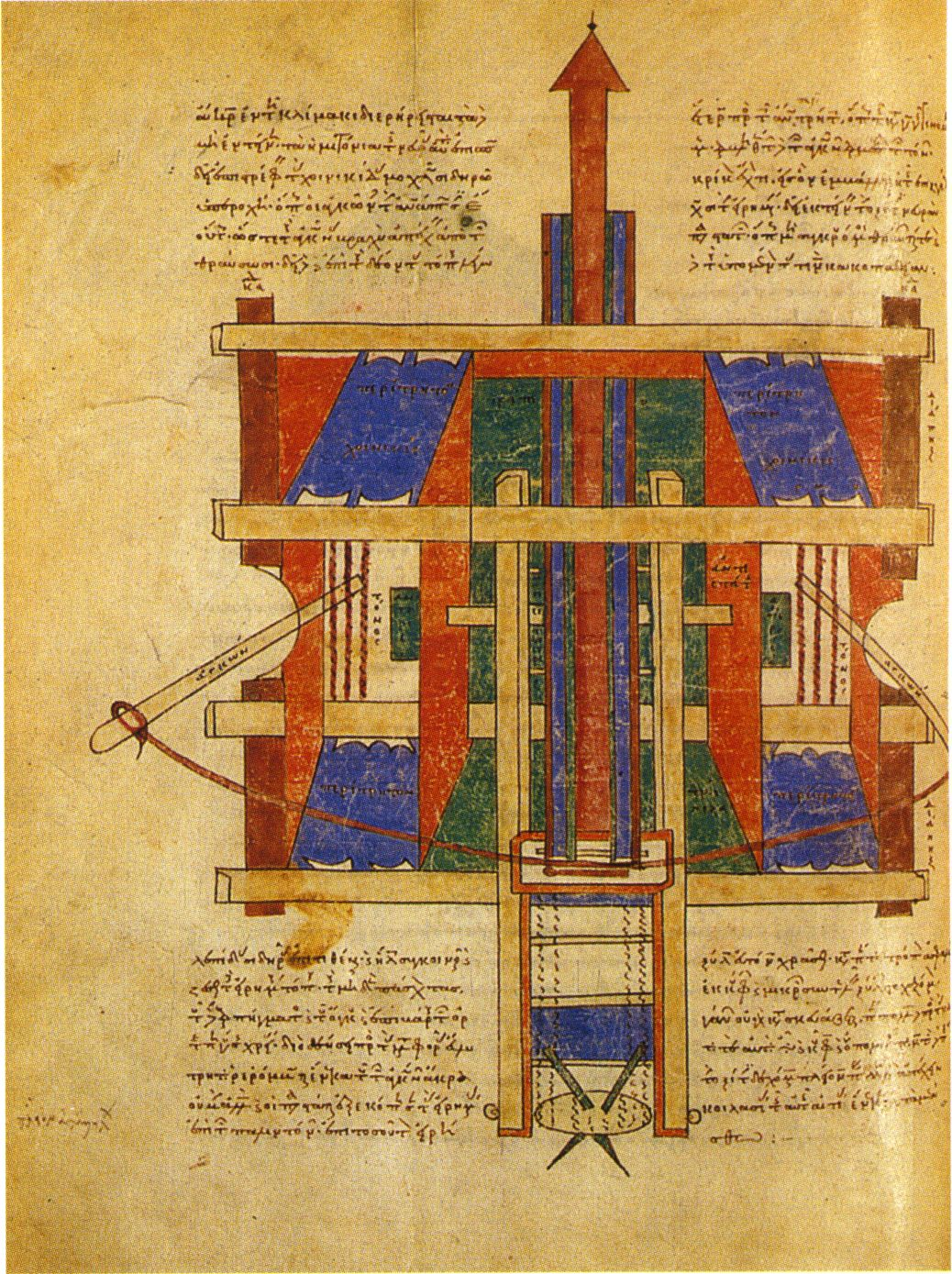
Illustration of a large catapult from a medieval copy of Hero of Alexandria's Belopoiika

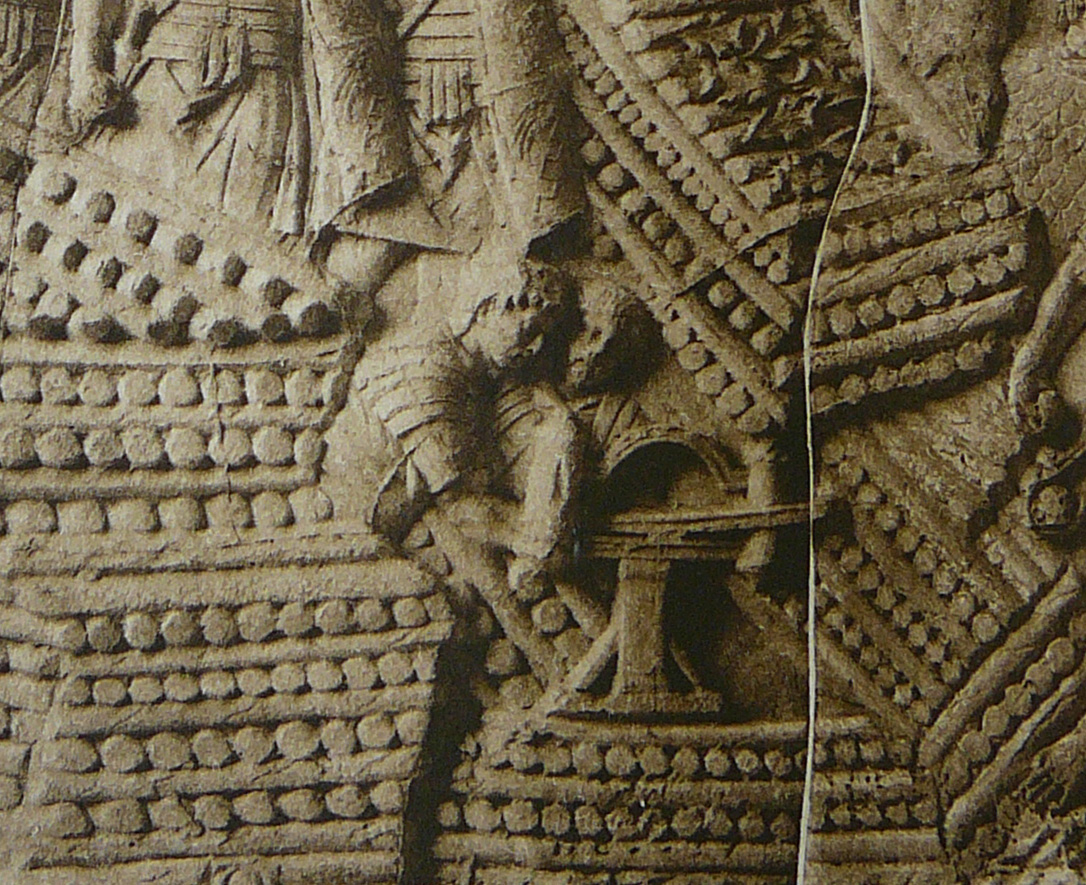
Roman "catapult-nest" in the Trajan's Dacian Wars

The catapult and crossbow in Greece are closely intertwined. Primitive catapults were essentially "the product of relatively straightforward attempts to increase the range and penetrating power of missiles by strengthening the bow which propelled them". The historian Diodorus Siculus (fl. 1st century BC), described the invention of a mechanical arrow-firing catapult (katapeltikon) by a Greek task force in 399 BC. The weapon was soon after employed against Motya (397 BC), a key Carthaginian stronghold in Sicily. Diodorus is assumed to have drawn his description from the highly rated history of Philistus, a contemporary of the events then. The introduction of crossbows however, can be dated further back: according to the inventor Hero of Alexandria (fl. 1st century AD), who referred to the now lost works of the 3rd-century BC engineer Ctesibius, this weapon was inspired by an earlier foot-held crossbow, called the gastraphetes, which could store more energy than the Greek bows. A detailed description of the gastraphetes, or the "belly-bow", along with a watercolor drawing, is found in Heron's technical treatise Belopoeica.

A third Greek author, Biton (fl. 2nd century BC), whose reliability has been positively reevaluated by recent scholarship, described two advanced forms of the gastraphetes, which he credits to Zopyros, an engineer from southern Italy. Zopyrus has been plausibly equated with a Pythagorean of that name who seems to have flourished in the late 5th century BC. (Note: Lewis established a lower date of no later than the mid-4th century. So did de Camp.) He probably designed his bow-machines on the occasion of the sieges of Cumae and Milet between 421 BC and 401 BC. The bows of these machines already featured a winched pull back system and could apparently throw two missiles at once.

Philo of Byzantium provides probably the most detailed account on the establishment of a theory of belopoietics (belos = "projectile"; poietike = "(art) of making") circa 200 BC. The central principle to this theory was that "all parts of a catapult, including the weight or length of the projectile, were proportional to the size of the torsion springs". This kind of innovation is indicative of the increasing rate at which geometry and physics were being assimilated into military enterprises.

From the mid-4th century BC onwards, evidence of the Greek use of arrow-shooting machines becomes more dense and varied: arrow firing machines (katapaltai) are briefly mentioned by Aeneas Tacticus in his treatise on siegecraft written around 350 BC. An extant inscription from the Athenian arsenal, dated between 338 and 326 BC, lists a number of stored catapults with shooting bolts of varying size and springs of sinews. The later entry is particularly noteworthy as it constitutes the first clear evidence for the switch to torsion catapults, which are more powerful than the more-flexible crossbows and which came to dominate Greek and Roman artillery design thereafter. This move to torsion springs was likely spurred by the engineers of Philip II of Macedonia. Another Athenian inventory from 330 to 329 BC includes catapult bolts with heads and flights. As the use of catapults became more commonplace, so did the training required to operate them. Many Greek children were instructed in catapult usage, as evidenced by "a 3rd Century B.C. inscription from the island of Ceos in the Cyclades [regulating] catapult shooting competitions for the young". Arrow firing machines in action are reported from Philip II's siege of Perinth (Thrace) in 340 BC. At the same time, Greek fortifications began to feature high towers with shuttered windows in the top, which could have been used to house anti-personnel arrow shooters, as in Aigosthena. Projectiles included both arrows and (later) stones that were sometimes lit on fire. Onomarchus of Phocis first used catapults on the battlefield against Philip II of Macedon. Philip's son, Alexander the Great, was the next commander in recorded history to make such use of catapults on the battlefield, such as at the Battle of Jaxartes, as well as to use them during sieges.

The Romans started to use catapults as arms for their wars against Syracuse, Macedon, Sparta and Aetolia (3rd and 2nd centuries BC). The Roman machine known as an arcuballista was similar to a large crossbow. Later the Romans used ballista catapults on their warships.

== Other ancient catapults ==
In chronological order:

- 19th century BC, Egypt, walls of the fortress of Buhen appear to contain platforms for siege weapons.
- c.750 BC, Judah, King Uzziah is documented as having overseen the construction of machines to "shoot great stones".
- between 484 and 468 BC, India, Ajatashatru is recorded in Jaina texts as having used catapults in his campaign against the Licchavis.
- between 500 and 300 BC, China, recorded use of mangonels. They were probably used by the Mohists as early as the 4th century BC, descriptions of which can be found in the Mojing (compiled in the 4th century BC). In Chapter 14 of the Mojing, the mangonel is described hurling hollowed out logs filled with burning charcoal at enemy troops. The mangonel was carried westward by the Avars and appeared next in the eastern Mediterranean by the late 6th century AD, where it replaced torsion powered siege engines such as the ballista and onager due to its simpler design and faster rate of fire. The Byzantines adopted the mangonel possibly as early as 587, the Persians in the early 7th century, and the Arabs in the second half of the 7th century. The Franks and Saxons adopted the weapon in the 8th century.

== Medieval catapults ==
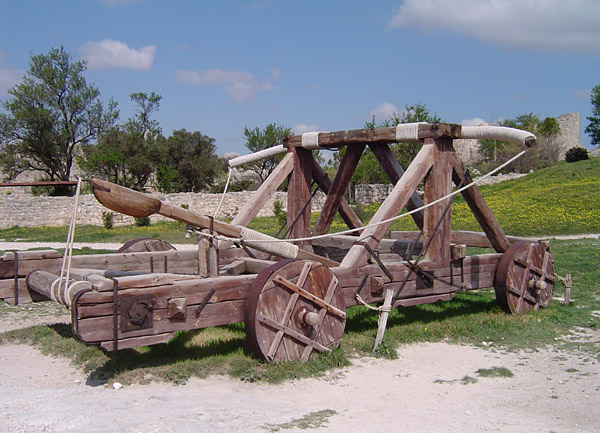
Replica of a Petraria Arcatinus

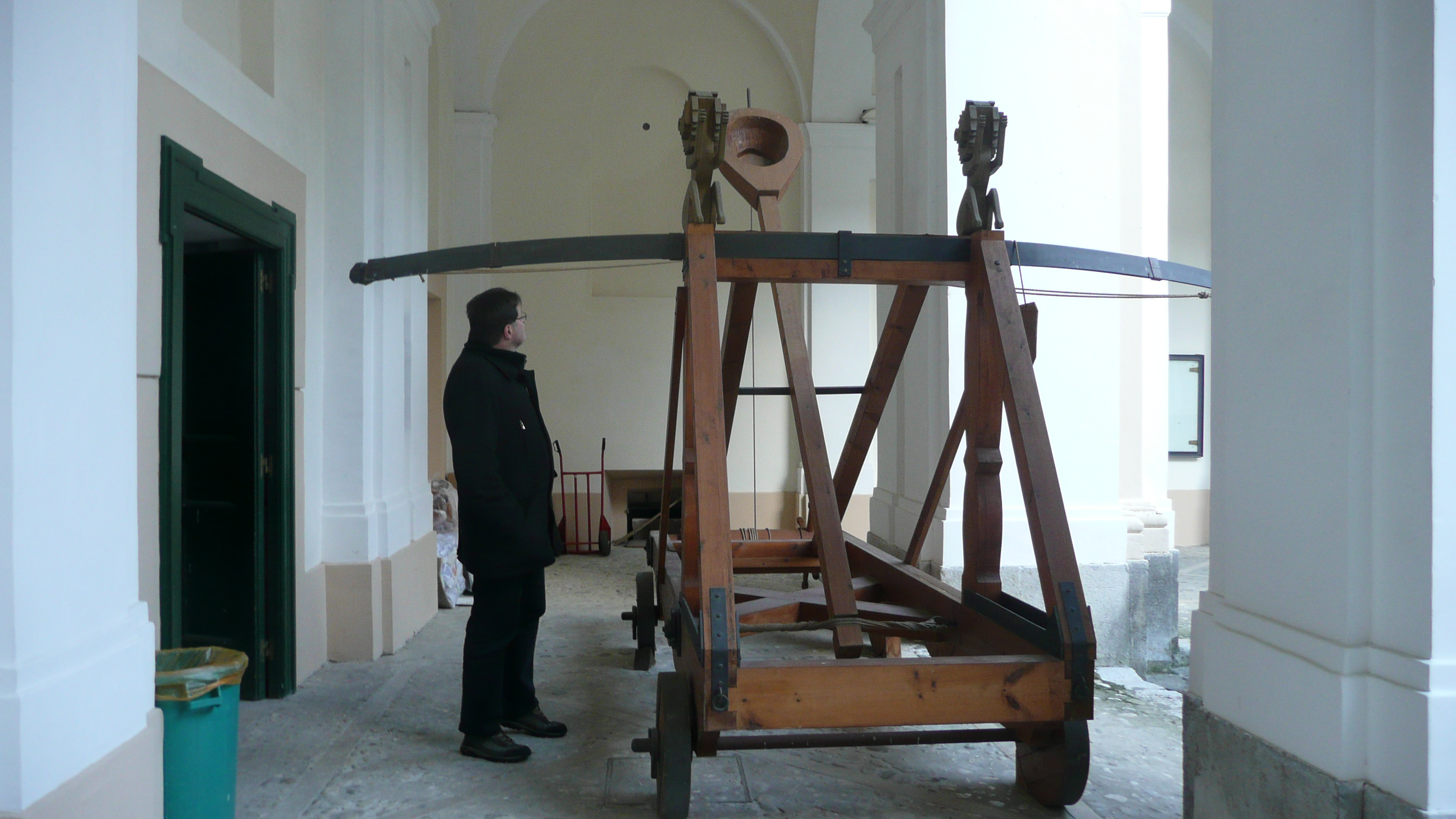
Petraria Arcatinus catapult in Mercato San Severino, Italy

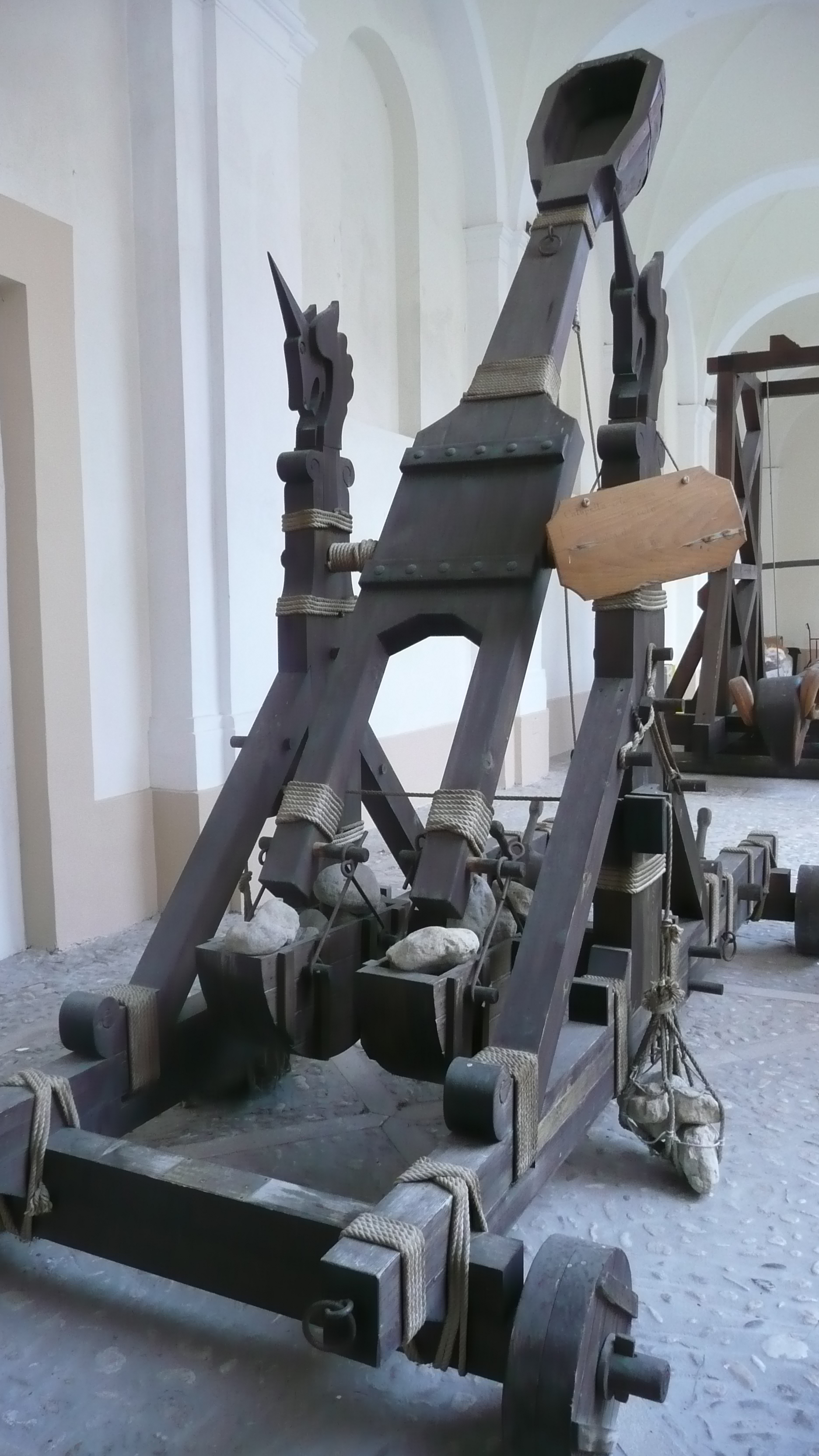
Catapult 1 Mercato San Severino

Castles and fortified walled cities were common during this period and catapults were used as siege weapons against them. As well as their use in attempts to breach walls, incendiary missiles, or diseased carcasses or garbage could be catapulted over the walls.

Defensive techniques in the Middle Ages progressed to a point that rendered catapults largely ineffective. The Viking siege of Paris (AD 885–6) saw the employment by both sides of virtually every instrument of siege craft known to the classical world, including a variety of catapults, to little effect, resulting in failure.

The most widely used catapults throughout the Middle Ages were as follows:

Ballista
Ballistae were similar to giant crossbows and were designed to work through torsion. The projectiles were large arrows or darts made from wood with an iron tip. These arrows were then shot along a flat trajectory at a target. Ballistae were accurate, but lacked firepower compared with that of a mangonel or trebuchet. Because of their immobility, most ballistae were constructed on site following a siege assessment by the commanding military officer.
Springald
The springald's design resembles that of the ballista, being a crossbow powered by tension. The springald's frame was more compact, allowing for use inside tighter confines, such as the inside of a castle or tower, but compromising its power.
Mangonel
This machine was designed to throw heavy projectiles from a bowl-shaped bucket at the end of its arm. Mangonels were mostly used for firing various missiles at fortresses, castles, and cities, with a range of up to 400 m (1,300 ft). These missiles included anything from stones to excrement to rotting carcasses. Mangonels were relatively simple to construct, and eventually wheels were added to increase mobility.
Onager
Mangonels are also sometimes referred to as Onagers. Onager catapults initially launched projectiles from a sling, which was later changed to a bowl-shaped bucket. The word Onager is derived from the Greek word onagros for "wild ass", referring to the "kicking motion and force" that were recreated in the Mangonel's design. Historical records regarding onagers are scarce. The most detailed account of Mangonel use is from Eric Marsden's translation of a text written by Ammianus Marcellius in the 4th Century AD describing its construction and combat usage.
Trebuchet

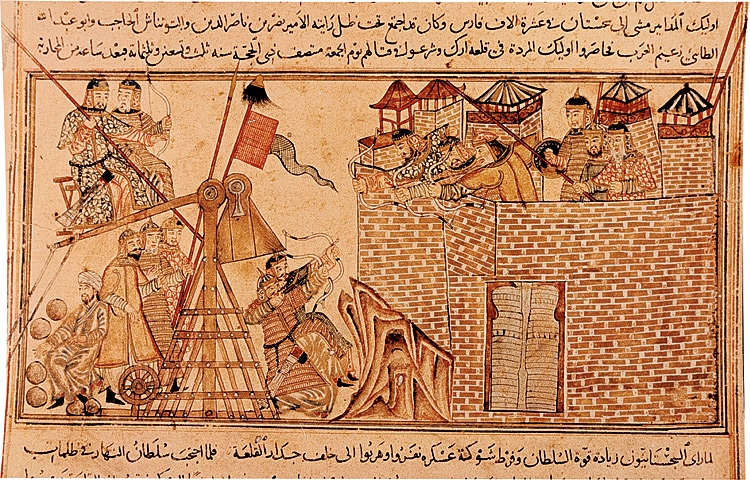
Ghaznavid warriors using trebuchet to besiege a city

Trebuchets were probably the most powerful catapult employed in the Middle Ages. The most commonly used ammunition was stones, but darts and sharp wooden poles could be substituted if necessary. The most effective kinds of ammunition though involved combustion, such as firebrands, and deadly Greek Fire. Trebuchets came in two different designs: Traction, which were powered by people, or Counterpoise, where the people were replaced with a counterweight on the short end. The most famous historical account of trebuchet use dates back to the siege of Stirling Castle in 1304, when the army of Edward I constructed a giant trebuchet known as Warwolf, which then proceeded to "level a section of [castle] wall, successfully concluding the siege".
Couillard
A simplified trebuchet, where the trebuchet's single counterweight is split, swinging on either side of a central support post.
Leonardo da Vinci's catapult
Leonardo da Vinci sought to improve the efficiency and range of earlier designs. His design incorporated a large wooden leaf spring as an accumulator to power the catapult. Both ends of the bow are connected by a rope, similar to the design of a bow and arrow. The leaf spring was not used to pull the catapult armature directly, rather the rope was wound around a drum. The catapult armature was attached to this drum which would be turned until enough potential energy was stored in the deformation of the spring. The drum would then be disengaged from the winding mechanism, and the catapult arm would snap around. Though no records exist of this design being built during Leonardo's lifetime, contemporary enthusiasts have reconstructed it.

== Modern use ==
=== Military ===
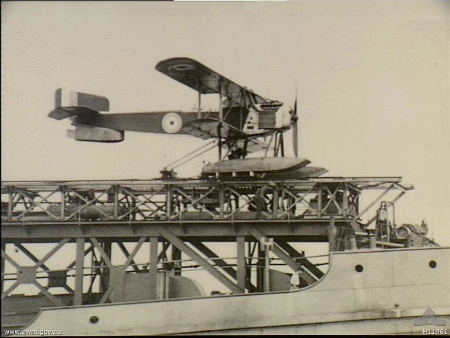
Fairey Campania floatplane on board HMS Slinger's catapult, in 1917

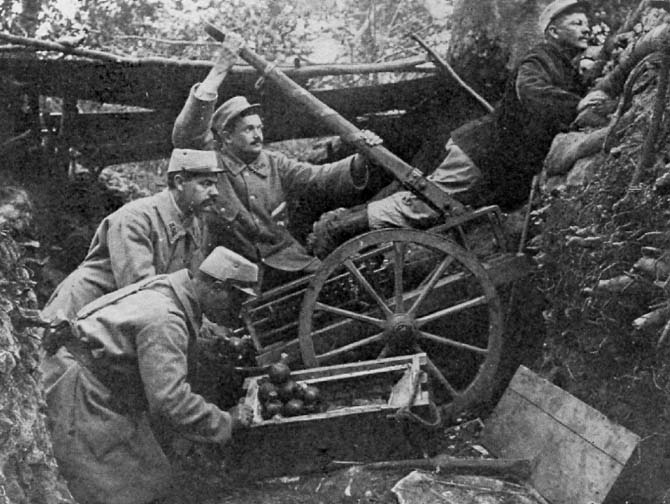
French troops using a catapult to throw hand grenades and other explosives during World War I

Aircraft catapults are used to launch aircraft from ships or land bases when the takeoff area is too short, or to get aircraft at significantly higher takeoff weights than normal airborne. The British initiated experiments in 1917 that continued until 1919, with HMS Slinger using Fairey Campania and Short 310 single engine floatplanes. These were preceded by unassisted launches from wooden platforms, but as aircraft weights and speeds increased, they became less and less useful. By the 1930s, aircraft catapults were common on major warships operated by most of the major naval powers, including battleships and cruisers in addition to aircraft carriers. Trial installations were also made on some destroyers. By the 1930s, some merchant vessels with both France and Germany were also using catapults to launch civil aircraft, either to speed up mail deliveries or news, or to shorten the length of the flight when aircraft ranges were inadequate, although military applications were in mind when these were being developed. Land installations were also in use, and the requirements for the Avro Manchester Second World War heavy bomber including being able to launch them with a catapult. During the Second World War, due to shortage of conventional aircraft carriers the British temporarily installed catapults on Merchant vessels (making them CAM ships) to launch a Hawker Hurricane fighter escort against marauding German Focke Wulf Condor maritime reconnaissance aircraft that were reporting convoy movements, and attacking ships. The Hurricanes could not be recovered and so either had to head for land, or ditch in the open ocean after being launched. With the development of the helicopter, most catapults aside from those used on aircraft carriers were made redundant.

The last large scale army use of catapults was during the trench warfare of World War I. During the early stages of the war, catapults were used to throw hand grenades across no man's land into enemy trenches. They were eventually replaced by small mortars.

The SPBG (Silent Projector of Bottles and Grenades) was a Soviet proposal for an anti-tank weapon that launched grenades from a spring-loaded shuttle up to 100 m (330 ft).

In 2024, during the Gaza war, a trebuchet created by private initiative of an IDF reserve unit was used to throw firebrands over the border into Lebanon, in order to set the undergrowth which offered possible camouflage to Hezbollah fighters on fire.

=== Toys, sports, entertainment ===
In the 1840s, the invention of vulcanized rubber allowed the making of small hand-held catapults, either improvised from Y-shaped sticks or manufactured for sale; both were popular with children and teenagers. These devices were also known as slingshots in the United States.

Small catapults, referred to as "traps", are still widely used to launch clay targets into the air in the sport of clay pigeon shooting.

In the 1990s and early 2000s, a powerful catapult, a trebuchet, was used by thrill-seekers first on private property and in 2001–2002 at Middlemoor Water Park, Somerset, England, to experience being catapulted through the air for 100 feet (30 m). The practice has been discontinued due to a fatality at the Water Park. There had been an injury when the trebuchet was in use on private property. Injury and death occurred when those two participants failed to land on the safety net. The operators of the trebuchet were tried, but found not guilty of manslaughter, though the jury noted that the fatality might have been avoided had the operators "imposed stricter safety measures." Human cannonball circus acts use a catapult launch mechanism, rather than gunpowder, and are risky ventures for the human cannonballs.

Early launched roller coasters used a catapult system powered by a diesel engine or a dropped weight to acquire their momentum, such as Shuttle Loop installations between 1977 and 1978. The catapult system for roller coasters has been replaced by flywheels and later linear motors.

Pumpkin chunking is another widely popularized use, in which people compete to see who can launch a pumpkin the farthest by mechanical means (although the world record is held by a pneumatic air cannon).

=== Smuggling ===
In January 2011, a homemade catapult was discovered that was used to smuggle cannabis into the United States from Mexico. The machine was found 20 ft (6 m) from the border fence with 4.4 pounds (2.0 kg) bales of cannabis ready to launch.

== See also ==
- Aircraft catapult
- Centrifugal gun
- List of siege engines
- Mangonel
- Mass driver
- National Catapult Contest
- Sling (weapon)
- Trebuchet

== Bibliography ==
- Ashley, James R (1998), The Macedonian Empire: The Era of Warfare Under Philip II and Alexander the Great, 359–323 BC, Jefferson, NC: McFarland & Co, ISBN 978-0-7864-1918-0.
- Campbell, Duncan (2003), Greek and Roman Artillery 399 BC – AD 363, Oxford: Osprey, ISBN 1-84176-634-8.
- Graff, David A. (2016), The Eurasian Way of War Military Practice in Seventh-Century China and Byzantium, Routledge, ISBN 978-0415460347.
- Lewis, MJT (1999), "When was Biton?", Mnemosyne, 52 (2): 159–68, doi:10.1163/1568525991528860.
- Liang, Jieming (2006), Chinese Siege Warfare: Mechanical Artillery & Siege Weapons of Antiquity – An Illustrated History, Leong Kit Meng, ISBN 978-9810553807.
- Marsden, Eric William (1969), Greek and Roman Artillery: Historical Development, Oxford: Clarendon, ISBN 978-0-19-814268-3.
- Purton, Peter (2009), A History of the Early Medieval Siege c.450-1200, The Boydell Press, ISBN 978-1843834489.
