= HMS Nairana (1917) =

Passenger ferry and seaplane carrier

Coordinates: 37.8407°S 144.9204°E

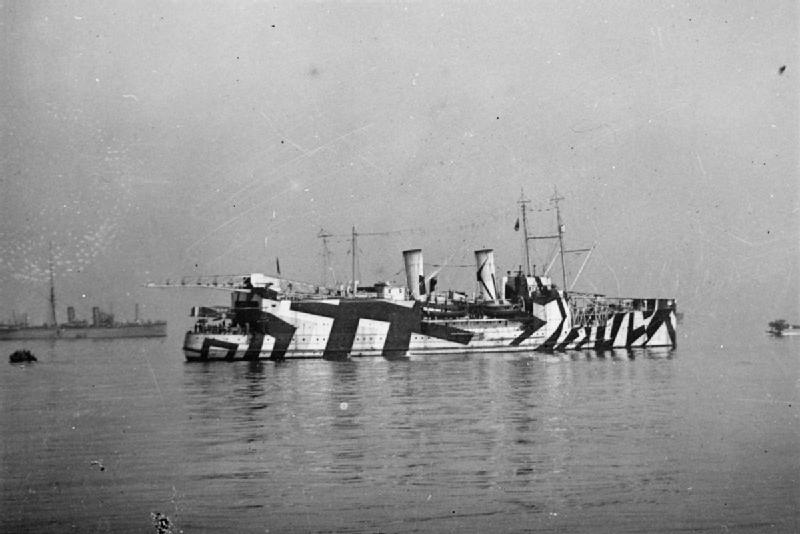
- Nairana in dazzle camouflage

History

Australia
- Name: Nairana
- Namesake: Tasmanian word for wedge-tailed eagle
- Owner: Huddart Parker
- Ordered: 22 January 1914
- Builder: William Denny and Brothers, Dumbarton, Scotland
- Cost: £129,830
- Laid down: 1914
- Launched: 21 June 1915
- Fate: Purchased by Royal Navy, 27 February 1917

United Kingdom
- Name: HMS Nairana
- Cost: £138,118
- Acquired: 27 February 1917
- Commissioned: 25 August 1917
- Fate: Sold to original owner, January 1921
- Owner: Huddart Parker
- Acquired: 1921
- Identification: United Kingdom official number 143476; Code letters THPM
- Fate: Transferred to Tasmanian Steamers, January 1922
- Owner: Tasmanian Steamers
- Port of registry: Melbourne
- Acquired: January 1922
- Out of service: February 1948
- Identification: United Kingdom official number 143476; Code letters THPM (1922-34); Code letters VJGY (1934-54)
- Fate: Wrecked 18 February 1951 and scrapped 1953–54

General characteristics
- Type: Seaplane carrier
- Displacement: 3,070 long tons (3,119 t)
- Length: 315.8 feet (96.3 m) p/p; 352 ft (107.3 m) o/a
- Beam: 45.6 ft (13.9 m)
- Draught: 13 ft 2 in (4.0 m) (mean)
- Installed power: 6,700 shp (5,000 kW); 6 × water-tube boilers
- Propulsion: 2 × shafts, 2 × geared steam turbines
- Speed: 19.5 knots (36.1 km/h; 22.4 mph)
- Range: 1,060 nmi (1,960 km; 1,220 mi) at 19.5 kn (36.1 km/h; 22.4 mph)
- Complement: 278
- Armament: 4 × 76 mm (3.0 in) 12 cwt guns
- Aircraft carried: 7–8
- Aviation facilities: 1 × flying-off deck forward

HMS Nairana (/naɪˈrɑːnə/) was a passenger ferry that was requisitioned by the Royal Navy (RN) as a seaplane carrier in 1917. She was laid down in Scotland in 1914 as TSS Nairana for the Australian shipping line Huddart Parker, but construction was suspended after the outbreak of the First World War. Following resumption of work, the ship was launched in 1915, and converted to operate wheeled aircraft from her forward flying-off deck, as well as floatplanes that were lowered into the water. She saw service during the war with the Grand Fleet, and in 1918–19 supported the British intervention in the Russian Civil War.

Nairana was returned to her former owners in 1921 and refitted in her original planned configuration, and spent the next 27 years ferrying passengers and cargo between Tasmania and Melbourne. She was twice struck by rogue waves in Bass Strait, and nearly capsized on both occasions. Nairana was the only Bass Strait ferry not requisitioned for military service in the Second World War, and so became the sole passenger ship with service to Tasmania during the conflict. She was laid up in 1948, wrecked in a storm three years later and scrapped in situ in 1953–54.

== Background and description ==
=== Original design ===
In December 1913, negotiations between the Australian shipping line Huddart Parker and the British shipbuilders William Denny and Brothers began for a passenger ship with some cargo capacity to serve in the Australian coastal trade. The shipping line wanted a vessel that would improve on their earlier ferry Loongana, which had also been built by Denny's. Huddart Parker decided on a design that could carry 800 long tons deadweight (DWT) of cargo on a draught of 14 feet (4.3 m) and could maintain 19.5 knots (36.1 km/h; 22.4 mph) for 12 hours. The ship was ordered on 22 January 1914, at a cost of £129,830, for delivery in May 1915. She was named Nairana, an Aboriginal Tasmanian name for the wedge-tailed eagle (Aquila audax).

Nairana was designed to accommodate 280 first-class and 112 second-class passengers, and had a crew of 26 officers, 42 crewmen and 25 stokers. She had an overall length of 328 feet (100.0 m), a beam of 45 feet 6 inches (13.9 m), and a draught of 14 feet 7 inches (4.4 m). Designed to displace 3,479 long tons (3,535 t) Nairana had tonnages of 3,547 gross register tons (GRT), 1,118 long tons DWT, 2,014 net register tons (NRT) and 3,311 tons Builder's Old Measurement.

The ship was launched 21 June 1915 at the Denny shipyard in Dumbarton, Scotland. The launch had been delayed nine months, after the British Government ordered that all construction workers be pulled from non-military vessels after the start of the First World War, and work had been resumed only to make her slipway available for warships. She remained at anchor for the next year and a half. The Royal Navy purchased her on 27 February 1917 for completion as a combined landplane and seaplane carrier. The price of £138,118 included the cost of conversion to her new role. The ship was nearly complete when requisitioned, although her propelling machinery was not yet installed. Consequently, only limited internal modifications, notably the addition of three large workshops, could be made.

=== Military configuration ===
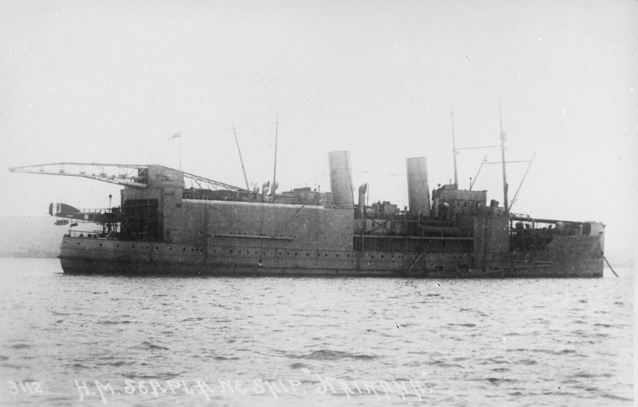
HMS Nairana in 1918

HMS Nairana displaced 3,070 long tons (3,119 t) in RN service. She was 352 feet (107.3 m) long overall, had a beam of 45.6 feet (547.2 in), and a mean draught of 13 feet 2 inches (4.01 m). The ship was powered by two sets of Parsons geared steam turbines designed to produce a total of 6,700 shaft horsepower (5,000 kW), each driving one three-bladed propeller. The turbines were powered by steam provided by six Babcock & Wilcox water-tube boilers at a working pressure of 202 psi (1,393 kPa; 14 kgf/cm^{2}). On her sea trials, Nairana made 7,003 shp (5,222 kW) and reached 20.32 knots (37.63 km/h; 23.38 mph). She carried 448 long tons (455 t) of coal which gave her a range of 1,060 nautical miles (1,960 km; 1,220 mi) at a speed of 19.5 knots (36.1 km/h; 22.4 mph). Her crew numbered 278, including 90 aviation personnel.

The ship was armed with four 40-calibre, 3-inch (76 mm) 12-pounder 12 cwt (Note: "Cwt" is the abbreviation for hundredweight, 12 cwt referring to the weight of the gun.) quick-firing guns on single mounts. Two of these were mounted on the forecastle as low-angle guns, and the other two were mounted on the rear hangar roof as anti-aircraft guns. They fired 12.5-pound (5.7 kg) projectiles at a muzzle velocity of 2,359 ft/s (719 m/s); this gave a maximum range of 9,720 yd (8,890 m).

Nairana was fitted with a 95-foot (29.0 m) flying-off deck forward, intended for aircraft with wheeled undercarriages, and a prominent hangar aft. A massive latticework gantry crane protruded aft from the hangar roof and a twin-boom derrick forward were fitted to handle her aircraft. The smaller forward hangar was built under the ship's bridge and the aircraft were raised to the flight deck overhead by a 22-by-14-foot (6.7 m × 4.3 m) lift, one of the first in the RN. The forward hangar could fit four single-seat fighters and the rear hangar had a capacity of four floatplanes. The ship could lower them into the water while steaming at 19 knots (35 km/h; 22 mph) and recover the floatplanes at 6 knots (11 km/h; 6.9 mph). She carried 1,200 imperial gallons (5,500 L; 1,400 US gal) of petrol for her aircraft.

During her service, Nairana carried Beardmore W.B.III, Fairey Campania, Short Type 184, and Sopwith Baby, Pup, and 2F1 Camel aircraft.

== Career ==
=== Military service ===
Upon commissioning on 25 August 1917, Nairana was assigned to the Battle Cruiser Force of the Grand Fleet at Scapa Flow, carrying four Short Type 184 floatplanes and four Beardmore W.B.III aircraft. She saw little operational use as she was employed for pilot training and ferrying aircraft to ships equipped with flying-off decks.

In 1918, Nairana participated in the North Russia Campaign in support of the British intervention in the Russian Civil War. On 1 August she took part in what was probably the first fully combined air, sea and land military operation in history, when she and her Campania seaplanes joined Allied ground forces and other ships in driving the Bolsheviks out of their fortifications on Modyugski Island at the mouth of the Northern Dvina River. Nairana used her own guns on the Bolshevik batteries. She and her aircraft then scouted ahead of the Allied force as it proceeded up the channel to Arkhangelsk. The appearance of one of her Campanias over Arkhangelsk caused the Bolshevik troops there to panic and abandon the city. Nairana sustained no damage during the assault. As of October, the ship was carrying five Campanias and two Sopwith Babies, although these last two aircraft were replaced by Sopwith Camels in 1919.

By May 1919, Nairana was refitting in Rosyth. She then ferried a flight of Fairey IIIC floatplanes to North Russia for use by the Royal Air Force later in the month. She remained at Murmansk for several weeks before proceeding on to Kem. There the ship was inspected by Rear-Admiral John Green, Rear-Admiral Commanding in the White Sea, on 29 July. At the end of August, Nairana proceeded to Onega where her aircraft observed for the monitor HMS Erebus as the latter bombarded the town for several days before returning to Kem. She departed Russia on 8 October and arrived back at Rosyth four days later. Later that month the ship was transferred to Devonport to begin the process of decommissioning from naval service.

=== Ferry service ===
The British Government sold Nairana to William Denny and Brothers after her service in Russia to be rebuilt to her original plans, and the ship was handed over to Huddart Parker in January 1921. Nairana arrived in Melbourne in March, after a two-month voyage from Plymouth, and commenced her first Bass Strait crossing on 18 April 1921. She was registered in Melbourne under the British flag and was allocated the United Kingdom official number 143765, and the code letters THPM. Transferred to Tasmanian Steamers in January 1922, she operated the Bass Strait run from Launceston, Devonport and Burnie to Melbourne for the next 26 years. She accommodated 250 passengers in first class and 140 in second, and generally cruised at 18 knots (33 km/h; 21 mph). She was withdrawn from service for overhaul at Sydney's Cockatoo Island Dockyard in October 1922, and again in September–October 1923. In January 1925 Nairana was chartered by the federal government and crewed by non-union labour, following a strike by shipping workers. She was taken out of service for a major overhaul at Cockatoo Island from May to October 1927. On the night of 24 January 1928, she was struck by a rogue wave in heavy seas, and almost capsized; one woman, already ill when she boarded in Launceston, died.

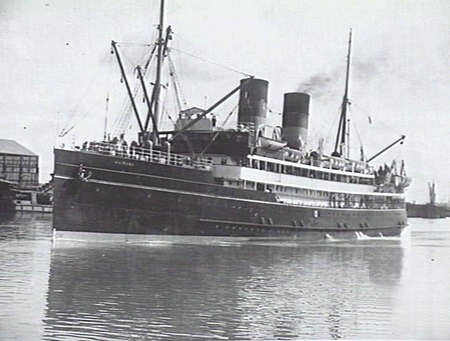
Nairana as a Bass Strait ferry between the wars

As well as passengers, Nairana regularly carried cargo, including gold bullion, and live animals such as horses and cattle between Tasmania and the mainland. A Tasmanian devil being transported to Melbourne Zoo in a wooden crate placed in one of the ship's four horse stalls escaped by chewing a hole through its box, and was never seen again. In 1934, her code letters were changed to VJGY. Nairana was withdrawn from service in December 1935 as a result of a ship workers' strike, returning to the Bass Strait run in the new year. As she neared Port Phillip Bay on 12 April 1936, on a clear day with apparently calm seas, she was again struck by a rogue wave and rolled onto her port side before swinging back over to starboard and eventually righting. The impact injured most of her 88 passengers and killed four, including a family of three who disappeared after being swept overboard. Despite this, she proceeded to her berth in the Yarra River, having sustained only minor damage.

After war was declared in September 1939, Nairana began carrying military personnel as well as commercial passengers. Her hull, previously black, was painted grey, and she was fitted with paravanes to defend against mines, a BL (breech-loading) 4-inch Mk VIII anti-submarine gun on the aft promenade deck, and a 20 mm Oerlikon anti-aircraft gun on her deckhouse. She also carried some .303 rifles for shooting at mines. As a coal burner that emitted tell-tale black smoke visible for miles, Nairana was not considered for war service, the only Bass Strait ferry not to be requisitioned. She thus became the sole commercial passenger vessel to operate between Tasmania and the mainland through the war years, maintaining a heavy schedule. The ship underwent repairs for 13 days at Williamstown, Victoria, after running aground in the Tamar River in 1943.

Nairana had her final overhaul at Cockatoo Island between February and April 1944. By mid-1947, airlines had captured a significant portion of the passenger trade across Bass Strait, and Nairana's schedule was reduced. On 31 December, her captain collapsed and died as he was speaking to two of his officers while the ship was alongside in Burnie; a post-mortem examination attributed the death to heart disease. Nairana made her last crossing from Tasmania to the mainland on 13–14 February 1948, after which she was retired and laid up in Melbourne. Sold for scrap to William Mussell Pty Ltd, Williamstown, Nairana broke her moorings during a gale on 18 February 1951 and was driven ashore off Port Melbourne. Unrecoverable, she was broken up in place in 1953–54.

== Legacy ==
Throughout her career as a Bass Strait ferry, Nairana had displayed a commemorative plaque and a photograph from her days as a carrier, presented by the British Admiralty in recognition of her service in the First World War, and especially her part in the fall of Arkhangelsk. After she was retired, the plaque went on display at the Museum of Wellington City & Sea, New Zealand, and the photograph at the Launceston Maritime Museum, Tasmania.
