= Pompeiiana, Inc. =

Pompeiiana, Inc. was a 501c3 not-for-profit corporation dedicated to the study of Latin at the secondary school level. It was founded by Bernard F. Barcio, L.H.D. and was run by a board of directors, which included Allen W. Clowes (vice president), Carl R. Dortch (treasurer), Mrs. Lillian R. Barcio (secretary), and Philip S. Kappes (legal counsel) It was known for sponsoring and coordinating "such nation-wide Latin-oriented multi-discipline projects as the National Catapult Contest", the National Chariathon, and for publishing the Pompeiiana Newsletter.

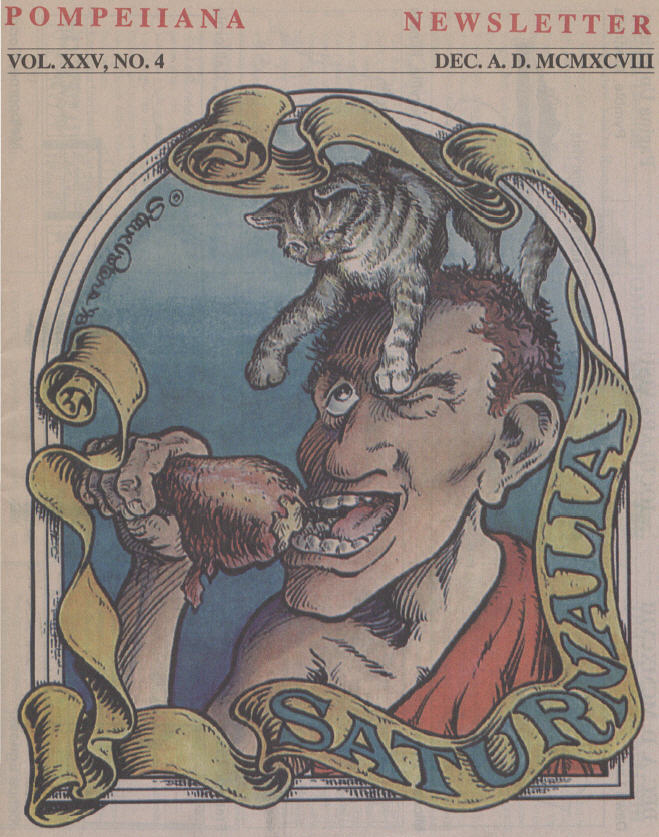
Front cover of the Pompeiiana Newsletter, December 1998, Volume 25, Issue four, with cover art by Steve Peters.

== The National Catapult Contest ==
The National Catapult Contest, was a national competition started by Bernard F. Barcio, L.H.D., while he was a Latin teacher at Park School in Indianapolis in 1966. The contest expanded annually until ceasing in 1977. During the first year of the contest, students were only allowed to utilize tools and techniques that would have been available to ancient Romans. Later, the use of modern technology was allowed. Over the course of the history of the event, more than 100 catapults were created by high school students from all over the United States. Coverage of the National Catapult Contest appeared extensively in the national media of the United States, including in Sports Illustrated, Seventeen Magazine, and on NBC News. In 1978, Dr. Barcio published an authoritative history of the contest, including detailed instructions on the building of modern catapults, in a book titled Catapult Design, Construction & Competition.

== The Pompeiiana Newsletter ==
The Pompeiiana Newsletter was a monthly publication distributed to Latin students all over the world. It included feature articles, poems, comics, puzzles and other items intended to aid in the instruction of Latin and Classical Studies. The Pompeiiana Newsletter was published from 1974 through 2003. In 2008, Dr. Barcio granted Bolchazy-Carducci Publishers exclusive rights too all back issues of the publication. Bolchazy-Carducci subsequently uploaded all 229 issues of the newsletter to their website where the content is offered free "to Latin teachers, students, and others interested in Classics."
