= Tasmanian Steamers =

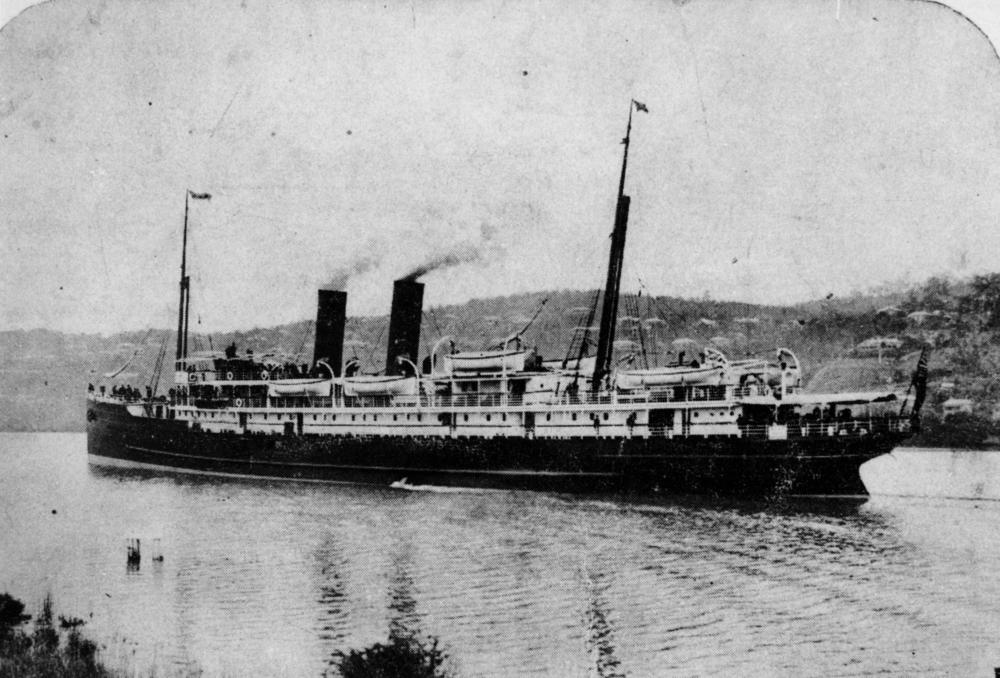
Loongana, built in 1904 and scrapped in 1934

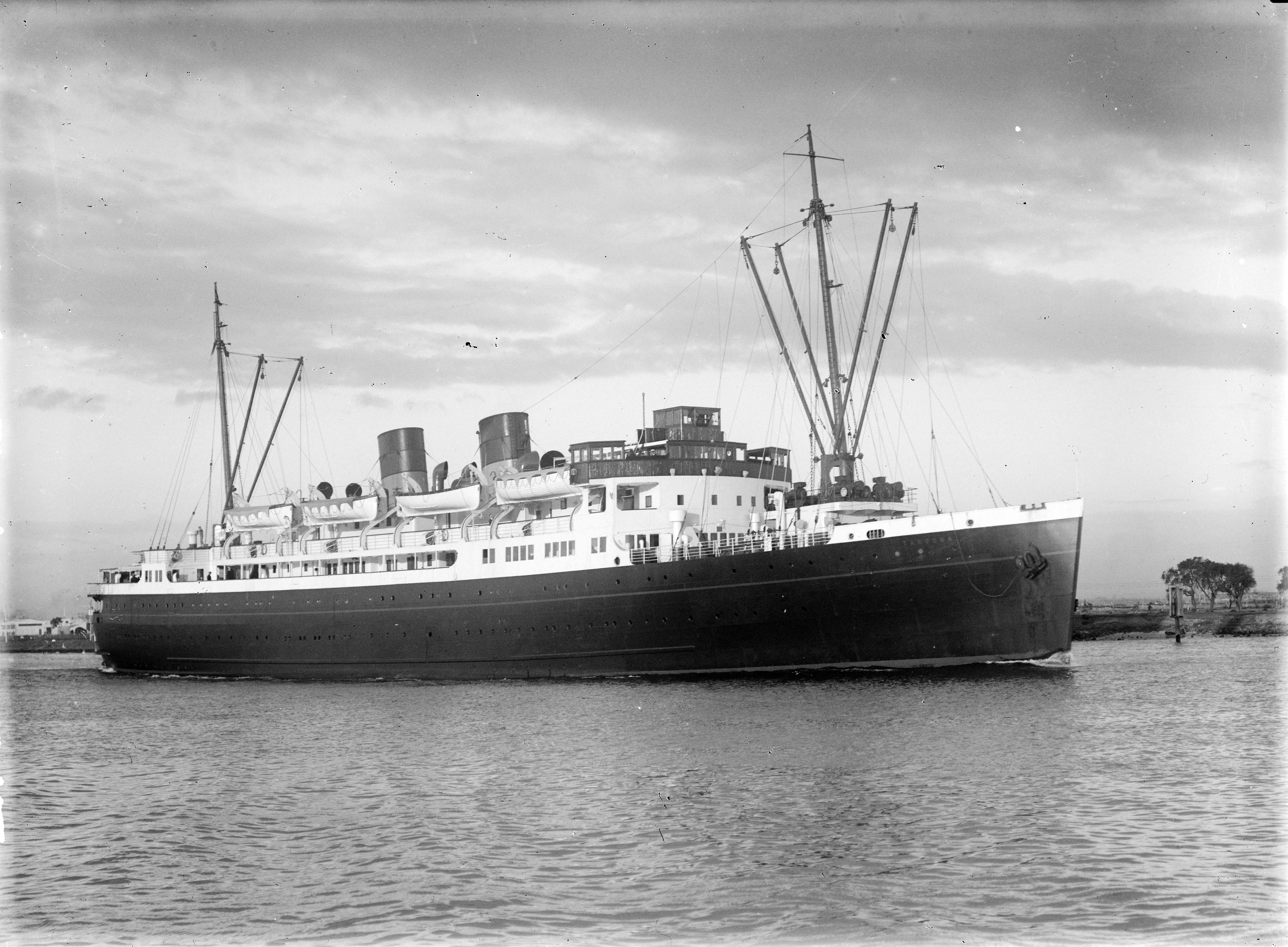
Taroona, built in 1935, sold in 1959 and scrapped in 1989

Tasmanian Steamers Proprietary Limited was a company that operated passenger ferries across the Bass Strait from 1921 to 1959. Union Company and Huddart Parker each owned 50%.

== History ==
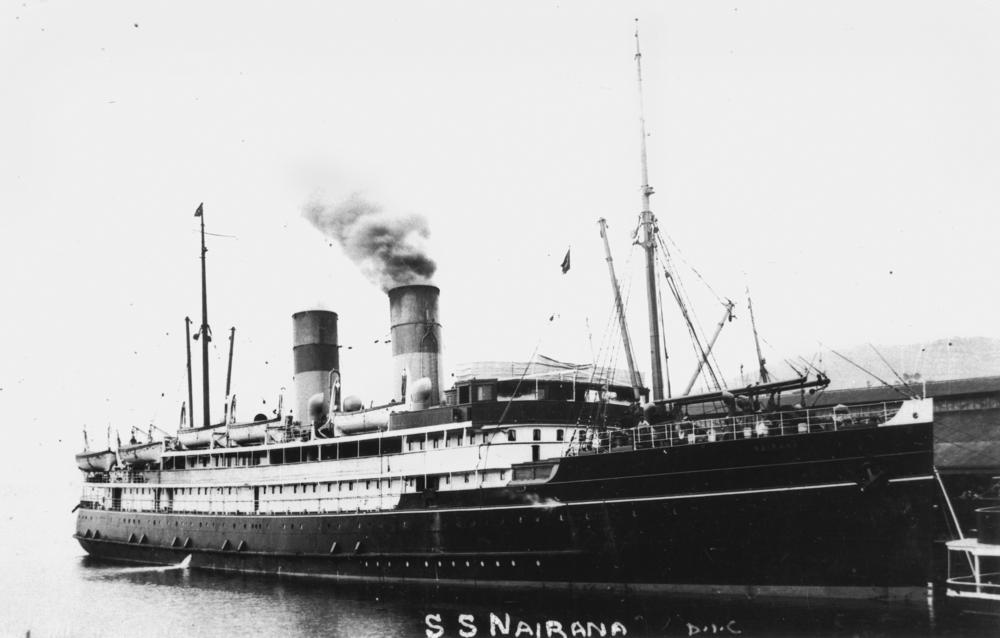
Nairana, built in 1914–17 and scrapped in 1953–54

Tasmanian Steamers Pty Ltd was formally established on 22 December 1921 to manage shipping services between Tasmania and mainland Australia. The company operated several vessels over the following decades, including Nairana, Taroona, and Loongana. These ships were vital to Tasmania’s transport network before the widespread use of commercial aviation, carrying passengers, livestock, produce, and mail between Tasmanian ports and Melbourne.

The company’s operations were heavily affected by both World Wars. During World War I, some vessels were requisitioned or adapted for military service. Taroona served as an Australian troopship and for a short period also transported troops for New Zealand military forces. During World War II, Bass Strait shipping faced the threat of enemy naval mines and submarine attacks, forcing ships to operate under wartime restrictions and heightened security measures. Despite these dangers, Tasmanian Steamers continued to maintain essential transport links throughout the war years.

By the 1950s, increasing competition from air travel and changing transport economics reduced the profitability of passenger shipping services across Bass Strait. In 1959, the Australian National Line acquired the company’s assets, bringing Tasmanian Steamers’ independent operations to an end. Passenger services were subsequently reorganized under government-controlled shipping operations. Nairana herself was withdrawn from service and scrapped in 1953–54 after more than three decades in operation.

== Fleet ==
- Oonah
- Loongana
- Nairana
- Taroona
- Tatana

Streets in the Burnie suburbs of Shorewell Park and Malonga Park are named after the fleet.
