= SS Loongana =

Scottish-built Australian ferry

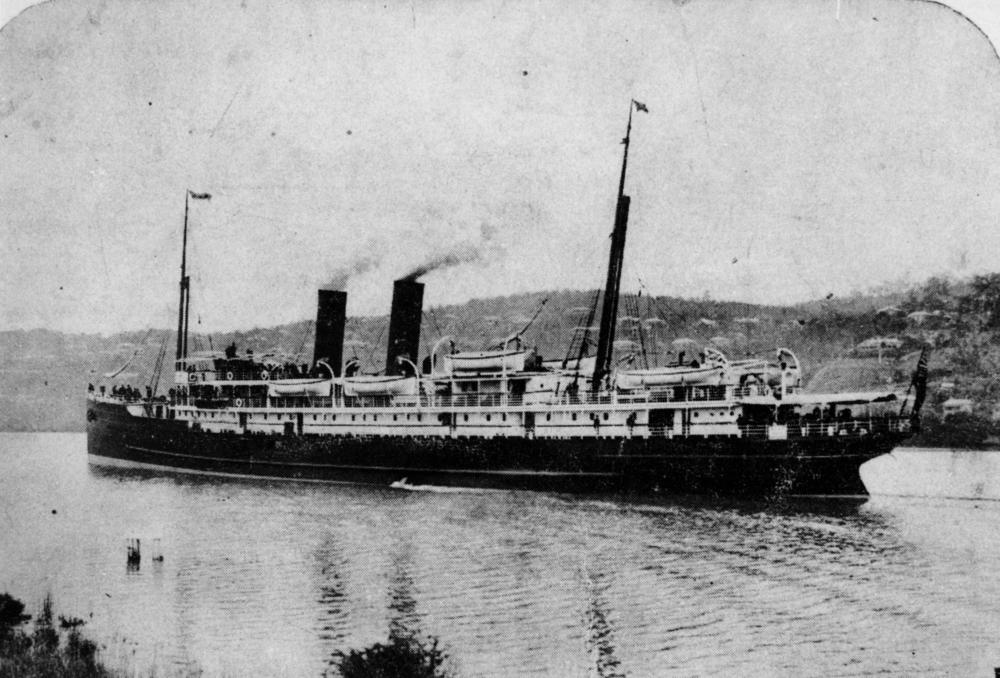

History
- Owner: Union Steamship Company of New Zealand (1904–1922); Tasmanian Steamers (1922–)
- Builder: William Denny & Brothers
- Launched: 1904
- In service: 1904–1935
- Fate: Scrapped 1936

General characteristics
- Tonnage: 2448 tons
- Length: 300 ft (91 m)
- Beam: 43 ft (13 m)
- Depth: 23.3 ft (7.1 m)
- Speed: 20 kn (37 km/h; 23 mph)

SS Loongana was a Bass Strait passenger ship, launched by William Denny & Brothers, Dumbarton, on 2 June 1904 and initially owned by Union Steamship Company of New Zealand at a cost of £87,794 for their Melbourne-Launceston route, replacing the Pateena. In December 1918, a spare propeller shaft fell from its sling through the bottom of the ship during unloading. On 1 January 1922 she and Oonah were transferred to Union's subsidiary, Tasmanian Steamers SS Loongana was in service from 1904 to 1935 and was the first ship registered in the southern hemisphere with steam turbine propulsion; three Parsons Marine Steam Turbine Company, Newcastle, 500-horsepower (370 kW) steam turbines, driving three screws at 18 knots (33 km/h; 21 mph) (service); 19.75 knots (36.58 km/h; 22.73 mph) (trials), with 246 first class, 136 second class, a cargo capacity of 661 cubic metres (23,350 cu ft) and a crew of 98. It has also been claimed that she was the first ocean-going turbine steamer in the world, as she left on her maiden voyage to Melbourne on 31 August 1904. Another contender for the title, RMS Victorian, was only launched the week before. During the 1912 North Mount Lyell Disaster she crossed the strait in 12 hours and 46 minutes at 22 knots (41 km/h; 25 mph), carrying rescue gear from Victorian mines. She was replaced by SS Taroona in March 1935 and laid up until sold for scrap to Tanaka Kabusiki Kaisya, Osaka. She was towed there by Kanna to Sakamoto Shoji KK, Osaka in September 1936 in November 1936.

Loongana is an Aboriginal word meaning 'to be swift', or 'to fly'.

== Sources ==
- Blainey, Geoffrey (2000). The Peaks of Lyell (6th ed.). Hobart: St. David's Park Publishing. ISBN 0-7246-2265-9.
- Clements, Graham (2005). "Bass Strait Passenger Ships". In Alexander, Alison (ed.). The Companion to Tasmanian History. Centre for Tasmanian Historical Studies, University of Tasmania. ISBN 1-86295-223-X.
