= National Catapult Contest =

The National Catapult Contest was an annual, national competition held between 1966 and 1977 in Indianapolis, Indiana, which, over the course of its history, led to the creation of more than 100 modern catapults. Teams of Latin students across the United States authentically recreated the catapults of Ancient Rome using materials and techniques that would have been available to the ancient Romans. The teams then transported their working catapults to Indianapolis, where they competed against each other toward the goal of hurling a 100-pound stone 100 yards. The inaugural firing of MARS I, the first catapult created for this purpose, was held on March 15, 1966, the Ides of March, a nod to the assassination of Julius Caesar, on the grounds of Park School (Indianapolis, Indiana), and was covered by the Huntley-Brinkley Report on NBC News. Though that first attempt only resulted in the hurling of a 103-pound rock three feet, by 1977, the year of the final National Catapult Contest, teams had successfully built authentic Roman catapults that routinely hurled rocks as heavy as 50 and 75 pounds more than 200 yards.

== History ==
The National Catapult Contest originated out of a simple directive from the Academic Development Committee of Indianapolis' Park School for Boys (now Park Tudor School) in December 1965, which "urged the faculty to review continuously the content and method of their instruction," and "further, not to forego unusual methods of stimulating the interest and involvement of students." Acting on this directive, Bernard F. Barcio, then the Latin Master of the school, announced to his class that he would support them in the undertaking of a project of their choice, so long as it pertained somehow to Latin. According to Barcio, "It was then that sophomore David Leve suggested that the Latin II class (thirteen members in all) build an authentic Roman Catapult."

Under Barcio's leadership, a student team consisting of Andy SerVaas, David Leve, Mike Ryan, John Townsend, Geoff Reynolds, Richard Vonnegut, Laurel Woodard, John Katterjohn and Russ Staines" proceeded to undergo the construction of a catapult powered by rope and a 12-foot-long wooden bow.

=== Failure to Launch ===
Interest in the unusual project quickly spread through the school, and the larger community. The students predicted their catapult would be able to hurl a 100-pound rock 100 yards. The school even dubbed March 8, 1966, as their first annual "rock gathering day," which they used to locate a suitable projectile for the planned first firing of the war machine. Students eventually found "a 103-pound granite boulder" suitable for the purpose, which they named "Gaul Blaster." On March 15, 1966, the entire school, including parents, administrators and alumni, led by Mr. Barcio, marched out to the field in front of the school to fire the catapult. National media was present to record the event. Following a dramatic drum roll and bugle call by the Marian College bugle corp, the students fired the machine. The wooden bow sprang forward, emitting "an ominous cracking sound." Instead of flying 100 yards through the air, Gaul Blaster rolled pitifully off the bow, landing three feet in front of the catapult. Rather than deeming the event a failure, Barcio designated three feet as the first official modern world catapult record.

=== More media coverage ===
Over the eleven years of the National Catapult Contest, the event was covered multiple times by national news media outlets. In addition to the Huntley-Brinkley Report, it was covered by Patrick Trese, a sports reporter for NBC, and appeared on NBC News First Tuesday, hosted by Sander Vanocur, in 1969, and 1970, as well as on the NBC Chronolog series in 1971, and 1972. David Dortch and Mary Hyde, winners of the first and fifth National Catapult Contests, respectively, appeared on the American Broadcasting Company program To Tell the Truth.

Sports Illustrated covered the National Catapult Contest twice, once in a brief article in 1970, and again in a full-length feature article titled "First among Those Who Cast Stones," written by Bruce Newman.

The Catpult Contest was also covered in Seventeen Magazine in May 1975, in an article titled "Catapult Fever...Hurling Boulders Is the Latest Craze."

== Chronology ==
March 15, 1966 Mars I (bentwood bow) built on the former Park School campus on Colds Spring Road in the basement of the gym. The idea evolved in Bernard Barcio’s nine-member Latin II Class at the suggestion of David Leve (’68). Fired on the Ides of March, and covered by local media and by NBC producer Pat Trese, whose award-winning footage was shown on National News that same evening. A cracked bow allows the Gaul Blaster (rock) to only go 3 feet. Members of the class included John Katterjohn (Phillopos), David Leve (Oinophilos), Geoff Reynolds (Peracles), Mike Ryan (Alexandros), Andy Servaas (Odysseus), Russ Staines (Hector), John Townsend (Eros), Richard Vonnegut (Heracles), and Laurel Woodard (Homeros).

October 1, 1966

The Mars I is improved with a new bow and a sling, and Latin students traveled to Guelph, Ontario, Canada for the Centennial Celebration of the 11th Field Artillery Regiment. A bowling ball covered in plaster is fired 40 feet.

(Bernard Barcio is now 28 years old)

March 15, 1967

Cold Springs Road Campus: “2 p.m. festivities, culminating in the Second Annual Firing of Mars I.” (Park School weekly schedule)

March 15, 1968

After Park School moves to its new campus at Lilly Orchard, The Latin students once again fire the improved Mars I. The catapult is then put on display outside the parking lot entrance to the new Gymnasium, along with the original Gaul Blaster rock, which was stolen shortly afterwards. The original bow was displayed with a commemorative plaque on the wall outside Mr. Barcio’s Latin classroom at the north end of the first floor in what is now the Lower School Building. The bow was later put in storage but has since been misplaced.

March 15, 1969

Park fires the Mars I catapult, with its new bow, for a final time.

March 14, 1970

Culver returns to the new campus, where a large parade precedes the competition. Park Latin students participating in the parade and firing of the Mars II catapult were: Lee Alig (Artemedorus), Fritz Anderson (Cinna), Kent Baker (Brutus), Charles Bookwalter (Hippocrates), Gary Cohen (Casca), Will Gould (Decius), Lance Hamilton (Caesar), Doug Hughes (Pulsator II), John Kimble (Metellus), Ed King (Sisyphus), Blaise Morton (Euripides), Tom Moses (Popilius), David Noling (Ermes), Jay Nyhart (Oedipos), Steve Scofield (Idiotes), John Simon (Pulsator I), Mark Thomas (Cassius), Karl Tauer (Zeus), and Clinton White (Achilles). The competition is covered in a brief article in Sports Illustrated (April 6, 1970) and again by Pat Trese for NBC First Tuesday. At the end of the school year, Mr. Barcio leaves Park for North Central H.S.

March 15, 1971

Park School for Boys merges with Tudor Hall for Girls to form Park-Tudor School. Latin Classes are now co-ed and on January 25, the students challenge Mr. Barcio’s North Central Latin students to compete on the Park-Tudor campus on the Ides of March. Park-Tudor Latin Students issuing the challenge signed only their Greek and Latin class names: Plato, Idiotes, Achilles I, Oedipus, Esipus, Appolodorus, Helena, Socrates, Nemo, Geminus, Eandros, Hermes I, Euripides, Zeus, Achilles II, Eros, Benigra, Hermes II, Alexandros and Aristotle. Their Latin teachers were signed as D. Coclea and A. Minimevadus. Mr. Barcio’s students build a new trebuchet, called Pacator. David Dortch (Spanish student) builds his own machine, the Ares I and defeats Park and North Central at the Park School Invitational. The event is covered on NBC Chronolog. The contest is also featured in the Britannica Review of Foreign Language Education (1971, pp. 201–2), and in Campus Life magazine (March 1972).

April 22, 1972

Culver Military Academy hosts First National Catapult Contest on its campus in Marshall County, IN. Park-Tudor’s Spiro and Ares II, and North Central’s Pacator, Magnus Fiz and Hylus catapults are transported by the US Army Reserve at the invitation of the Pentagon. Thirteen Indiana catapult teams compete in a festival atmosphere, while eight more in three other states call in their achievements. David Dortch of Park-Tudor wins the 1st National Catapult Contest with his newly designed Ares II. David is invited to appear on ABC’s To Tell the Truth, and the contest is once again covered on NBC Chronolog.

April 14, 1973

After competing at Culver, the Park-Tudor and NCHS Catapults are reassembled on Stafford Road (off Kessler Blvd) on property owned by Washington Township Schools. Innovation and competition continue “off campus” as other schools from central Indiana and Kentucky join the Invitational. Nationwide, 32 catapults were constructed in eleven states. Although David Dortch’s Ares II performed well, firing a 10-pound rock 583 ft., Ft. Wayne H.S., wins the 2nd National Catapult Contest with its massive twisted rope catapult named Imperator.

The competition is featured in Outdoor Indiana (1973), in The Stentor (published by the Michigan Classical Conference), in The Classical Outlook (February 1974), and in Campus Life Magazine (November 1973).

May 11, 1974

The contest, now sponsored by Pompeiiana, incorporated by Mr. Barcio with the help of Allen Clowes, Carl Dortch and Philip Kappes, is held on the Stafford Road catapult field as schools from around Indiana try to set new records, with the hope that some school’s catapult may eventually achieve the original goal of hurling a 100-pound rock 100 yards. Park-Tudor students enter their catapults Anteres and Phoenix I. Latin students in Pascagoula, MS, set a world record with their bent wood catapult, Rebelorum, firing a 1-pound spear 668 feet. Ft. Wayne H.S.’s Imperator wins the 3rd National Catapult Contest. NCHS Latin student, Mary Hyde, begins construction on her 30-foot trebuchet (reaching an overall height of 61 feet), called Zephyrus, but takes two more years to complete her machine.

May 10, 1975

The contest is once again held on the Stafford Road catapult field. Wayne H.S.’s Imperator sets two records, hurling a 20-pound rock 369 feet, and a 30-pound rock 280 ft. Wayne H.S. Latin students win the Forth National Catapult Contest. North Central’s Mary Hood continues to work on Zephyrus. The contest is featured in the magazine Seventeen (May 1975).

May 15, 1976

This year 41 machines in seven states competed… 22 of them in Indianapolis. Mary Hyde completes Zephyrus on the Stafford Road catapult field and sets a record, hurling 75-[pimd rock 623 feet. North Central H.S. Latin students win the Fifth National Catapult Contest. The contest is covered in the New York Times (May 18, 1976, p. 31) and in Sports Illustrated (June 7, 1976, pp. 64 & 66). Mary Hyde is invited to appear on ABC’s To Tell the Truth.

May 14, 1977

Sixth and final year of the Pompeiiana-sponsored National Catapult Competition on the Stafford Road catapult field. Mary Hyde’s Zephyrus sweeps the national competition, setting all the records for a heavy weight trebuchet, hurling a 10-pound rock 779 feet, and surpassing the goal set in 1966, by hurling Park-Tudor’s originally rejected "Flying Balls Mean Dying Gauls" 100-pound rock 579 feet. Unfortunately, there was no local or national coverage of this final competition. Only home movies taken by Mr. Hyde recorded Mary’s record-setting shots. So long as the Stafford Road field remains undeveloped by Washington Township Schools, catapult remnants will, no doubt, remain visible among the weeds. Although all of Zephyrus’ shots are world records, Guinness declined to publish them because they do not want to encourage such a dangerous activity.

== The Book on catapults ==
By 1974, the National Catapult Contest had grown so significantly that it required management by some type of official organization. To that end, Bernard F. Barcio, the Latin teacher who had originally founded the project, created a non-profit organization called Pompeiiana, Inc., the goal of which was to promote classical studies at the secondary school level. Pompeiiana managed the contest until after eleven years of competition, the National Catapult Contest ceased official operations in 1977. The following year, Pompeiiana published the first edition of the book Catapult Design, Construction & Competition. This book presents a detailed account of the entire history of this event, including detailed diagrams demonstrating how the various types of catapults were designed and constructed, and a detailed list of records, which includes the participating students and schools, the dates, the weight of projectiles hurled, and the distances achieved. A second edition of the book was later published in paperback in 2006, and titled Catapult Design, Construction and Competition with the Projectile Throwing Engines of the Ancients.

== Types of catapults reconstructed ==
=== Counterweight Trebuchet ===
This type of catapult uses a swinging arm to hurl a projectile at a target. A cradle for the projectile is attached to the longest section of the arm, and a counterweight is attached to the shorter end. When the weight is released from the frame, it drops and causes the long arm to spring forward, launching the projectile forward. According to the official records of the National Catapult Contest, a catapult of this type named Zephyrus, built by students at North Central High School (Indianapolis), was the catapult that finally achieved the original goal of the projects, which was to hurl a 100-pound rock one hundred yards. In fact, Zephyrus hurled a 100-pound rock 579 feet—nearly twice the goal—in 1977. Additional Zephyrus records included hurling a 40-pound rock 798 feet, a 50-pound rock 750 feet, and a 75-pound rock 623 feet.

=== Twisted Rope, or Torsion siege engine ===
This type of catapult utilized a mechanism similar to that of a cross-bow, with a spring-loaded device attached to ropes. The rope is pulled back and made taut then when triggered, springs forward launching a projectile such as a spear or a stone. In 1977, the twisted rope catapult named Remus II, built by students at Eastwood High School in Indianapolis, set a National Catapult Contest record by hurling a 1-pound spear 701 feet.

=== Bent Wood ===
Similar to the trebuchet, the Bent Wood variety of catapult uses a wooden arm to hurl a projectile. In this case, the wooden arm is pulled back, or bent, so that enough tension is built up that when released. A projectile is then set in a cradle at the long end of the arm so when the arm is released, it snaps back into place, hurling the rock forward. Mars I, the first catapult created for this project, was a Bent Wood machine. Records set by Bent Wood catapults during the National Catapult Contests include the Rebelorum machine, built by students at Pascagoula High School in Pascagoula, Mississippi, throwing a one-pound spear 668 feet, three inches in 1974, Horologium Tintinnabulum, built by students at Mauston High School in Maustin, Wisconsin, which hurled a ten-pound rock 96 feet, 8 inches, in 1975, and Machina Gigantum, built by students of Ben Davis High School in Indianapolis, which hurled a one-pound rock 186 feet, three inches, in 1977.
