= HMS Campania (1914) =

Seaplane tender for the Royal navy

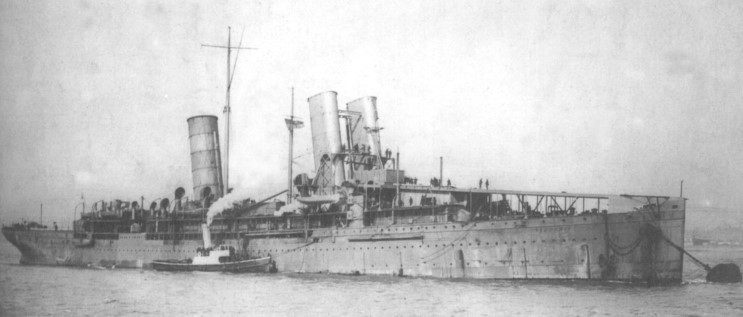
- Campania after her second refit

History

United Kingdom
- Name: Campania
- Builder: Fairfield Shipbuilding & Engineering, Govan, Glasgow
- Laid down: 1892
- Launched: 8 September 1892
- Acquired: 27 November 1914
- Commissioned: 17 April 1915
- Fate: Sank in the Firth of Forth, 5 November 1918

General characteristics
- Type: Aircraft/Seaplane carrier
- Displacement: 20,570 long tons (20,900 t)
- Length: 622 ft (189.6 m)
- Beam: 65 ft (19.8 m)
- Draught: 28 ft 5 in (8.7 m)
- Installed power: 28,000 ihp (21,000 kW)
- Propulsion: 2 × shafts, 2 × VTE steam engines
- Speed: 19.5 knots (36.1 km/h; 22.4 mph)
- Complement: 600
- Armament: 6 × 4.7 in (120 mm) guns; 1 × 3 in (76 mm) AA gun
- Aircraft carried: 10–12
- Aviation facilities: 1 × Flying-off deck forward

HMS Campania was a seaplane tender and aircraft carrier, converted from an elderly ocean liner by the Royal Navy early in the First World War. After her conversion was completed in mid-1915 the ship spent her time conducting trials and exercises with the Grand Fleet. These revealed the need for a longer flight deck to allow larger aircraft to take off, and she was modified accordingly. Campania missed the Battle of Jutland in May 1916, but made a number of patrols with elements of the Grand Fleet. She never saw combat and was soon relegated to a training role because of her elderly machinery. In November 1918 Campania was anchored with the capital ships of the Grand Fleet when a sudden storm caused her anchor to drag. With no second anchor being laid, she hit several of the ships and the collisions punctured her hull; she slowly sank, with no loss of life.

== Early career ==
Originally built as a passenger liner for Cunard Line's service between Liverpool and New York in 1893, RMS Campania was the holder of the Blue Riband award for speed early in her career. In October 1914, she was sold to the shipbreakers Thos. W. Ward as she was wearing out.

== Purchase and conversion ==
The Royal Navy purchased Campania from the shipbreakers on 27 November 1914 for £32,500, initially for conversion to an armed merchant cruiser equipped with eight quick-firing 4.7-inch (120 mm) guns. The ship was converted by Cammell Laird to an aircraft carrier instead and the two forward 4.7-inch guns were removed in favour of a 160-foot (48.8 m) flying-off deck. Two derricks were fitted on each side to transfer seaplanes between the water and the two holds. The amidships hold had the capacity for seven large seaplanes. The forward hold, underneath the flight deck, could fit four small seaplanes, but the flight deck had to be lifted off the hold to access the airplanes. HMS Campania was commissioned on 17 April 1915.

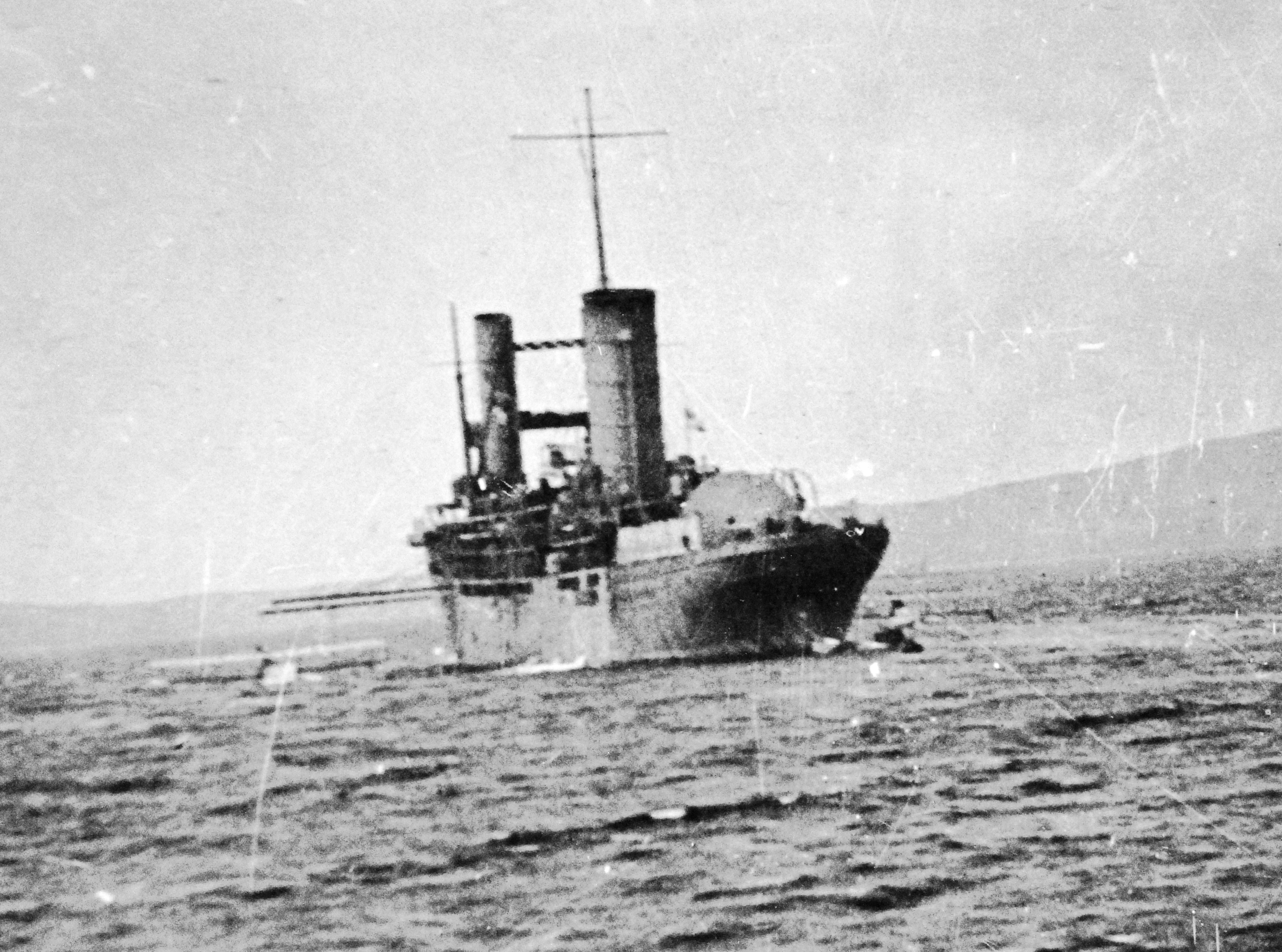
Campania after being modified into an aircraft carrier - note airplane at left

The first takeoff from the flight deck did not occur until 6 August 1915 when a Sopwith Schneider floatplane, mounted on a wheeled trolley, used 130 feet (39.6 m) of the flight deck while the ship was steaming into the wind at 17 knots (31 km/h; 20 mph). The Sopwith aircraft was the lightest and highest-powered aircraft in service with the Royal Naval Air Service, and the close call in a favourable wind demonstrated that heavier aircraft could not be launched from the flight deck.

By October 1915 Campania had exercised with the Grand Fleet seven times, but had only flown off aircraft three times as the North Sea was often too rough for her seaplanes to use. Her captain recommended that the flying-off deck be lengthened and given a steeper slope to allow gravity to boost the aircraft's acceleration and the ship was accordingly modified at Cammell Laird between November 1915 and early April 1916. The forward funnel was split into two funnels and the flight deck was extended between them and over the bridge to a length of 245 feet (74.7 m), so that aircraft from both holds could use the flight deck. A canvas windscreen was provided to allow the aircraft to unfold their wings out of the wind, and a kite balloon and all of its supporting equipment were added in the aft hold. Campania now carried seven Short Type 184 torpedo bombers and three or four smaller fighters or scouts; a Type 184 made its first takeoff from the flight deck on 3 June 1916, also using a wheeled trolley. This success prompted the Admiralty to order the world's first aircraft designed for carrier operations, the Fairey Campania. The ship received the first of these aircraft in late 1917 where they joined smaller Sopwith 1½ Strutter scouts. At various times Campania also carried the Sopwith Baby and Sopwith Pup.

Campania failed to receive the signal to deploy when the Grand Fleet departed Scapa Flow on 30 May 1916 en route to the Battle of Jutland, but she sailed two hours and fifteen minutes later. Even though she was slowly overtaking the fleet early in the morning of 31 May, she was ordered to return to Scapa Flow as she lacked an escort and German submarines had been reported in the area. The ship participated in some anti-submarine and anti-Zeppelin patrols, but she was later declared unfit for fleet duty because of her defective machinery and became a seaplane training and balloon depot ship. In April 1918 Campania, along with the Grand Fleet, was transferred from Scapa Flow to Rosyth.

== Sinking ==
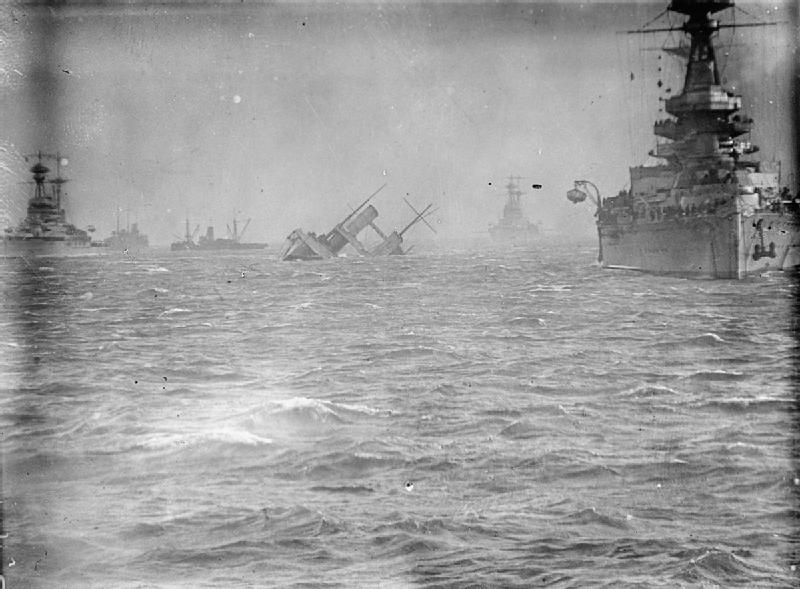
Campania sinking, 5 November 1918

Location of the wreck of HMS Campania.

On the morning of 5 November 1918, Campania was lying at anchor off Burntisland in the Firth of Forth. A sudden Force 10 squall caused the ship to drag anchor. She collided first with the bow of the nearby battleship Royal Oak, and then scraped along the side of the battlecruiser Glorious. Campania's hull was breached by the initial collision with Royal Oak, flooding her engine room and shutting off all main electrical power. The ship then started to settle by the stern, and sank some five hours after breaking free. The ship's crew were all rescued by neighbouring vessels. A Naval Board of Inquiry into the incident held Campania's watch officer largely responsible for her loss, citing specifically the failure to drop a second anchor once the ship started to drift.

The wreck of HMS Campania was initially afforded protection under the Protection of Wrecks Act, being designated in 2000. This designation was revoked in 2013 when the site was re-designated as a Historic Marine Protected Area under the Marine (Scotland) Act 2010. The remains of the four Campania aircraft and seven 1½ Strutters that she had on board when she sank are still entombed in her wreck.
