= HMS Pegasus (1917) =

British aircraft carrier

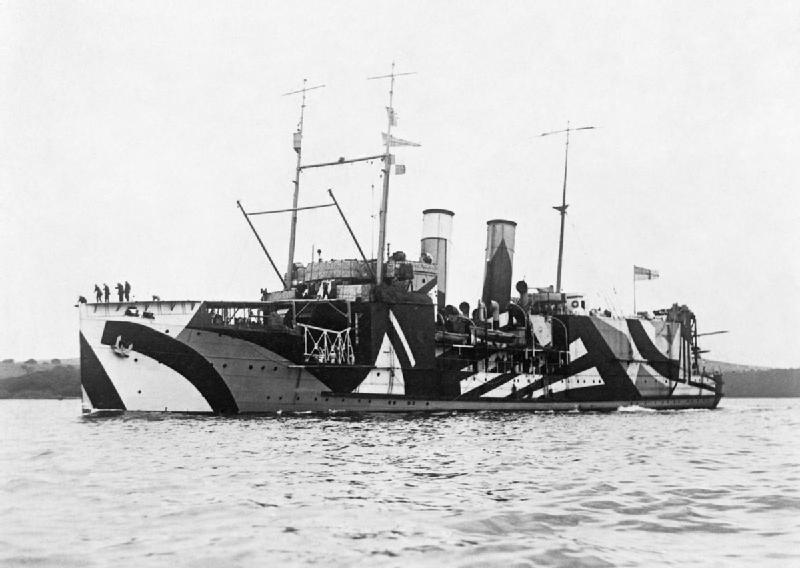
- HMS Pegasus in dazzle camouflage

History

United Kingdom
- Name: HMS Pegasus
- Namesake: Pegasus
- Builder: John Brown & Company, Clydebank
- Yard number: 431
- Laid down: 1914
- Launched: 9 June 1917
- Completed: 28 August 1917
- Acquired: 27 February 1917
- Commissioned: 14 August 1917
- Fate: Sold for scrap, 22 August 1931

General characteristics
- Type: Aircraft/Seaplane carrier
- Displacement: 3,315 long tons (3,368 t)
- Length: 332 ft 4 in (101.3 m)
- Beam: 43 ft (13.1 m)
- Draught: 15 ft 9 in (4.8 m)
- Installed power: 9,500 shp (7,100 kW)
- Propulsion: 2 × shafts, 2 × Steam turbines
- Speed: 20 kn (37 km/h; 23 mph)
- Range: 1,220 nmi (2,260 km; 1,400 mi) at 20 kn (37 km/h; 23 mph)
- Complement: 258
- Armament: 4 × 3-inch (76 mm) 12 cwt guns
- Aircraft carried: 9
- Aviation facilities: 1 × flying-off deck forward

HMS Pegasus was an aircraft carrier/seaplane carrier bought by the Royal Navy in 1917 during the First World War. She was laid down in 1914 by John Brown & Company of Clydebank, Scotland as Stockholm for the Great Eastern Railway Company, but construction was suspended at the start of the war. The ship was converted to operate a mix of wheeled aircraft from her forward flying-off deck and floatplanes that were lowered into the water. Pegasus spent the last year of the war supporting the Grand Fleet in the North Sea, but saw no combat. She spent most of 1919 and 1920 supporting British intervention against the Bolsheviks in North Russia and the Black Sea. The ship remained with the Mediterranean Fleet until 1924, but was placed in reserve in 1925 after a brief deployment to Singapore. Pegasus was sold for scrap in 1931.

== Design and description ==
The ship had an overall length of 332 feet 4 inches (101.3 m), a beam of 43 feet (13.1 m), and a draught of 15 feet 9 inches (4.8 m) at deep load. She displaced 3,315 long tons (3,368 t). Her two direct-drive steam turbines, each driving a propeller shaft, were designed to produce a total of 9,500 shaft horsepower (7,100 kW) and a speed of 20 knots (37 km/h; 23 mph). On sea trials in December 1914, Pegasus made 9,722 shp (7,250 kW) and reached 20.8 knots (38.5 km/h; 23.9 mph). The ship was converted from coal to fuel oil at the suggestion of her builders. She carried 350 long tons (356 t) of oil which meant that she could steam for 1,220 nautical miles (2,260 km; 1,400 mi) at her maximum speed. Her crew numbered 258, including 100 aviation personnel.

Pegasus's main armament consisted of four 40-calibre, 3-inch (76 mm) 12-pounder 12 cwt (Note: "cwt" is the abbreviation for hundredweight, 12 cwt referring to the weight of the gun.) guns. Two of these were mounted on the forecastle as low-angle guns, but the other two were mounted aft as anti-aircraft guns. They fired 12.9-pound (5.9 kg) projectiles at a muzzle velocity of 2,235 ft/s (681 m/s); this gave a maximum range of 11,750 yd (10,740 m) against surface targets and an anti-aircraft range of 19,000 feet (5,791 m). They had a rate of fire of 15 rounds per minute.

HMS Pegasus was fitted with a flying-off deck forward, intended for aircraft with wheeled undercarriages, and a prominent hangar aft. Two electric cranes were fitted aft and a twin-boom derrick forward to handle her aircraft. The smaller forward hangar was built under the ship's bridge and the aircraft were raised to the flight deck overhead by one of the first lifts in the Royal Navy. The forward hangar could fit five single-seat fighters and the rear hangar had a capacity of four floatplanes. The ship could lower them into the water while steaming at 19 knots (35 km/h; 22 mph) and recover the floatplanes at 6 knots (11 km/h; 6.9 mph). When Pegasus commissioned in 1917 she was assigned four Short Type 184 torpedo bombers and four Beardmore W.B.III fighters. In late 1918 she carried four Sopwith Camel 2F.1, one Type 184 and three Fairey Campania reconnaissance aircraft. In 1919 she began to operate various models of the Fairey III.

Pegasus carried 1,300 imperial gallons (5,900 L; 1,600 US gal) of petrol for her aircraft. Her magazines had the capacity for eight 18-inch (457 mm) torpedoes, 72 100-pound (45 kg), 108 65-pound (29 kg), and 68, later 84, 16-pound (7 kg) bombs.

== Career ==
HMS Pegasus was laid down in 1914 by the John Brown & Company of Clydebank, Scotland as Stockholm for the Great Eastern Railway Company's Harwich–Hook of Holland service, but her construction was suspended by the beginning of the First World War. The ship was purchased by the Royal Navy on 27 February 1917 and was launched on 9 June 1917. She was commissioned on 14 August 1917 and completed on 28 August 1917. She joined the Grand Fleet on completion and was assigned to support the Battle Cruiser Force. She participated in a few uneventful operations in the North Sea, but was mostly occupied with pilot training and ferrying aircraft to ships equipped with flying-off platforms. Pegasus supported the British intervention in the Russian Civil War between May and September 1919 and was based at Archangel. The ship returned to Rosyth and was briefly decommissioned. She recommissioned on 2 December 1919 and was transferred to the Mediterranean Fleet in March 1920. Pegasus ran aground on 9 March off Kerch, but was pulled off without suffering any significant damage. She supported the Evacuation of Novorossiysk by the Whites later that month and remained with the fleet until 1924. In 1923 the forward flying-off deck was removed and the ship was re-rated as an aircraft tender. She was stationed at Singapore in 1924–25. On 5 July 1925 she was placed in reserve at Devonport, but was briefly recommissioned in 1929. On 22 August 1931, the ship was sold to Thos. W. Ward of Sheffield for scrap, arriving at their Morecambe yard on 15 September, the last vessel to be fully broken up there.
