= Edward Grange =

Edward Rochfort Grange
- Born: 11 January 1892; Lansing, Michigan, United States
- Died: 15 July 1988 (aged 96); Preston, Ontario, Canada
- Military career
- Branch: Flying service
- Service years: 1915 - 1918
- Rank: Flight lieutenant
- Units: 1 Wing RNAS, No. 8 Squadron RNAS
- Awards: Distinguished Service Cross, French Croix de Guerre
- Other work: Civilian inspector and auditor of RCAF during World War II

Flight Lieutenant Edward Rochfort Grange was a World War I flying ace credited with five aerial victories. His postwar career included success as a businessman, and a return to aviation as a civilian inspector and auditor for the Royal Canadian Air Force during World War II.

Grange graduated from the American Curtiss Flying School in September 1915 and joined the Royal Naval Air Service. He served in 1 Wing on the French coast, and scored his first victory there by destroying a seaplane on 25 September 1916. He moved on to 8 Naval Squadron. On 4 January 1917, while flying Sopwith Pup no. N1594, he destroyed an Albatros D.II and drove two others down out of control. Three days later, he sent another D.II down out of control, but was wounded in the process. He was returned to England, and served as an instructor for the rest of the war.

== Honors and awards ==
Distinguished Service Cross (DSC)

Flight Lieut. Edward Rochfort Grange, R.N.A.S.

For conspicuous gallantry and skill on several occasions in successfully attacking and bringing down hostile machines, particularly on 4 January 1917, when during one flight he had three separate engagements with hostile machines, all of which were driven down out of control.

On 5 January 1917, lie attacked three hostile machines, one of which was driven down in a nose-dive.

On 7 January 1917, after having driven down one hostile machine, he observed two other enemy aircraft attacking one of our scouts. He was on the way to its assistance when he was attacked by a third hostile scout. He was hit in the shoulder by a bullet from this machine, but landed his aeroplane safely in an aerodrome on our side of the lines. Supplement to the London Gazette, 16 February 1917 (29947/1648)
