= Beardmore W.B.III =

WB.III
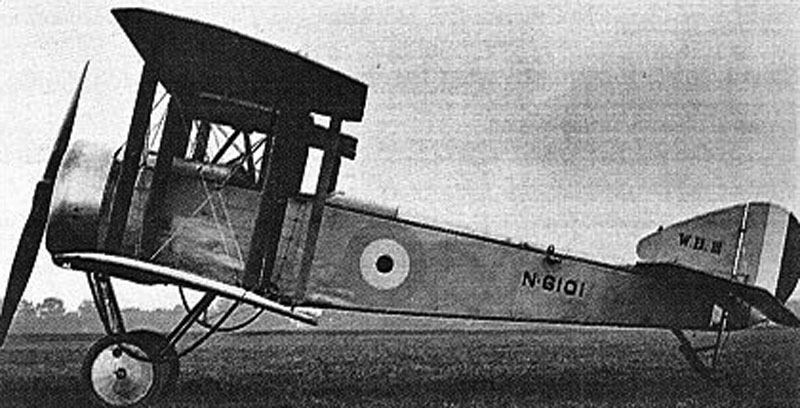

General information
- Type: Carrier-based fighter
- Manufacturer: William Beardmore and Company
- Primary user: Royal Navy
- Number built: 100

History
- First flight: 1917
- Developed from: Sopwith Pup

The Beardmore WB.III was a British carrier-based fighter biplane of World War I. It was a development of the Sopwith Pup that Beardmore was then building under licence, but was specially adapted for shipboard use.

== Design and development ==
Compared to the Sopwith Pup on which it was based, the WB.III featured a redesigned wing cellule with no stagger and an extra set of struts inboard, facilitating folding for stowage; a modified fuselage that carried emergency floatation gear; and main undercarriage that could be folded for stowage on the WB.IIIF. Later examples, designated WB.IIID, could jettison their undercarriage for safer water landings.

As many as one hundred were built, with small numbers deployed on various Royal Navy warships including the aircraft carriers HMS Furious and HMS Argus; and seaplane tenders HMS Nairana and HMS Pegasus. Performance was inferior that of to the Pup and it was largely superseded by the Sopwith 2F1 Ships Camel.

== Operators ==
United Kingdom

- Royal Naval Air Service

== Specifications ==
Data from Biplanes, Triplanes, and Seaplanes

General characteristics

- Length: 20 ft 3 in (6.17 m)
- Wingspan: 25 ft (7.6 m)
- Height: 8 ft 1 in (2.46 m)
- Wing area: 243 sq ft (22.6 m^{2})
- Empty weight: 890 lb (404 kg)
- Gross weight: 1,290 lb (585 kg)
- Powerplant: 1 × Le Rhône 9C 9-cylinder air-cooled rotary piston engine, 80 hp (60 kW)
- Propellers: 2-bladed fixed-pitch propeller

Performance

- Maximum speed: 103 mph (166 km/h, 90 kn)
- Endurance: 2 hours 45 minutes
- Service ceiling: 12,400 ft (3,800 m)
- Rate of climb: 534 ft/min (2.71 m/s)

Armament

- Guns: 1 × fixed, forward-firing .303 in Lewis gun

== See also ==
Related lists

- List of aircraft of the Royal Naval Air Service

== Bibliography ==
- Green, William & Swanborough, Gordon (2001) [1994]. The Complete Book of Fighters: An Illustrated Encyclopedia of Every Fighter Built and Flown (Revised and Updated ed.). London: Salamander Books. ISBN 1-84065-269-1.
- Owers, Colin (2023). Beardmore Aircraft of WWI: A Centennial Perspective on Great War Airplanes. Great War Aviation Centennial Series. Vol. 69. n.p.: Aeronaut Books. ISBN 978-1-953201-69-0.
