= Sopwith Pup =

British WW1 biplane fighter aircraft

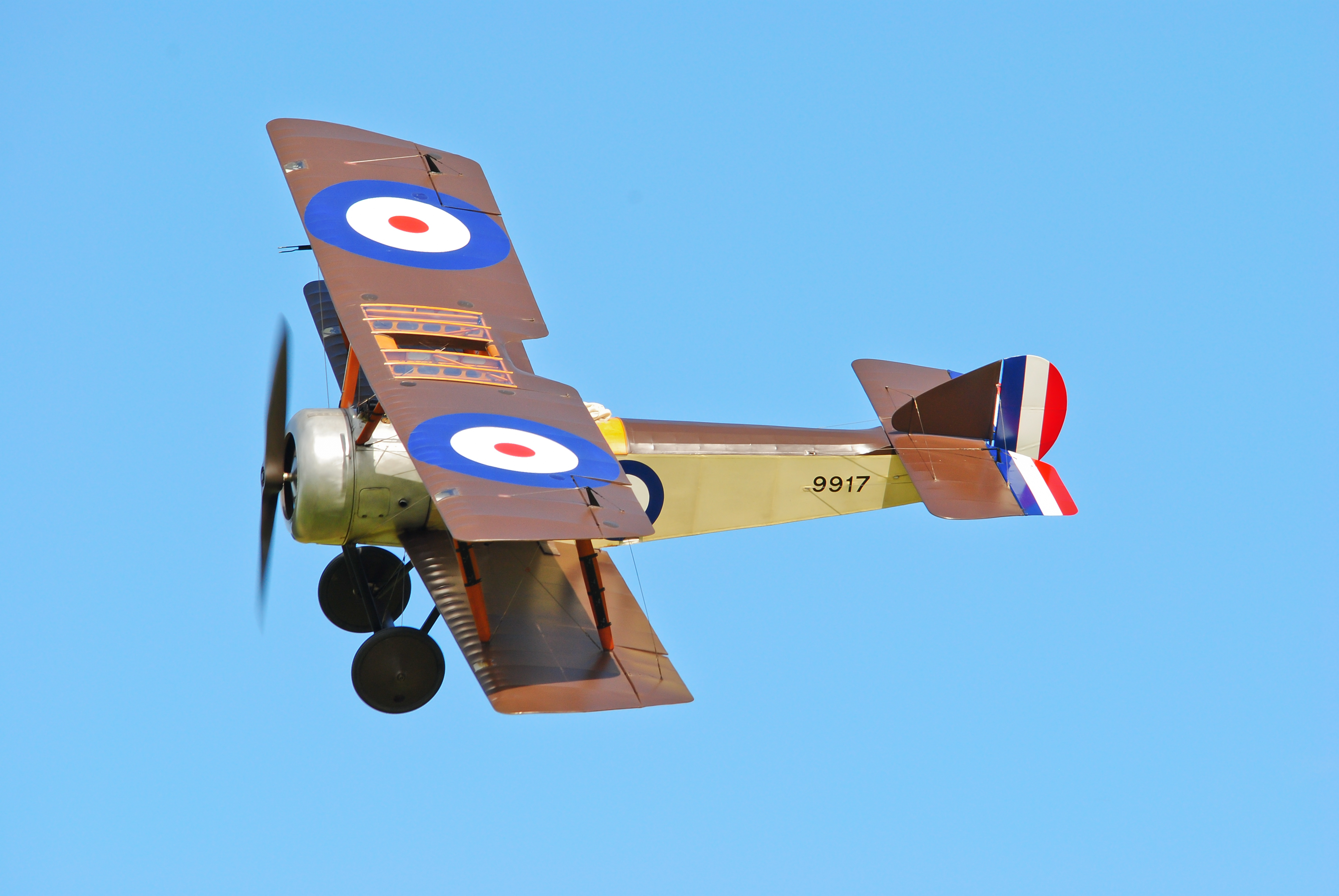

General information
- Type: Biplane fighter
- Manufacturer: Sopwith Aviation Company
- Designer: Herbert Smith
- Status: Retired
- Primary users: Royal Flying Corps Royal Air Force; Royal Naval Air Service
- Number built: 1,796

History
- Manufactured: 1916–1918
- Introduction date: October 1916
- First flight: 9 February 1916
- Variant: Beardmore W.B.III

The Sopwith Pup is a British single-seater biplane fighter aircraft built by the Sopwith Aviation Company. It entered service with the Royal Naval Air Service and the Royal Flying Corps in the autumn of 1916. With pleasant flying characteristics and good manoeuvrability, the aircraft proved very successful. Newer German fighters eventually outclassed the Pup, though it remained on the Western Front until late 1917. The remaining Pups were relegated to Home Defence and training units. The Pup's docile flying characteristics also made it ideal for use in aircraft carrier deck landing and takeoff experiments and training.

== Design and development ==
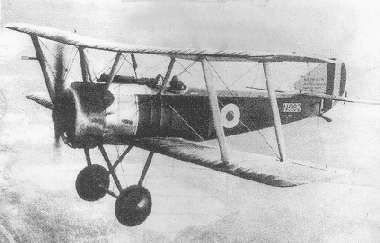
Sopwith Pup in flight (1917)

In 1915, Sopwith produced a small aircraft, known as "Hawker's Runabout" (or the SL.T.B.P), for the company's test pilot Harry Hawker. It was a single-seat, tractor biplane powered by a seven-cylinder 50 hp (37 kW) Gnome rotary engine. Another four similar aircraft have been tentatively identified as Sopwith Sparrows. Sopwith next developed a more powerful aircraft as a fighter that was heavily influenced by this design, although controlled laterally with ailerons rather than by wing warping.

The resulting aircraft was a single-bay, single-seat biplane with a fabric-covered wooden framework and staggered equal-span wings. The cross-axle type main landing gear was supported by V-struts attached to the lower fuselage longerons. The prototype and most production Pups were powered by the 80 hp (60 kW) Le Rhône 9C rotary engine. The armament was a single 0.303 in (7.7 mm) Vickers machine gun synchronized with the Sopwith-Kauper synchronizer.

A prototype was completed in February 1916 and sent to Upavon for testing in late March. The Royal Naval Air Service (RNAS) quickly ordered two more prototypes, then placed a production order. Sopwith was heavily engaged in the production of the Sopwith 1½ Strutter, and produced only a small number of Pups for the RNAS. Deliveries commenced in August 1916.

The Royal Flying Corps (RFC) also placed large orders for Pups. The RFC orders were undertaken by sub-contractors Standard Motor Co. and Whitehead Aircraft. Deliveries did not commence until the beginning of 1917. 1,796 Pups were built, including 96 by Sopwith, 850 by Standard Motor Co., 820 by Whitehead Aircraft, and 30 by William Beardmore & Co.

== Operational history ==
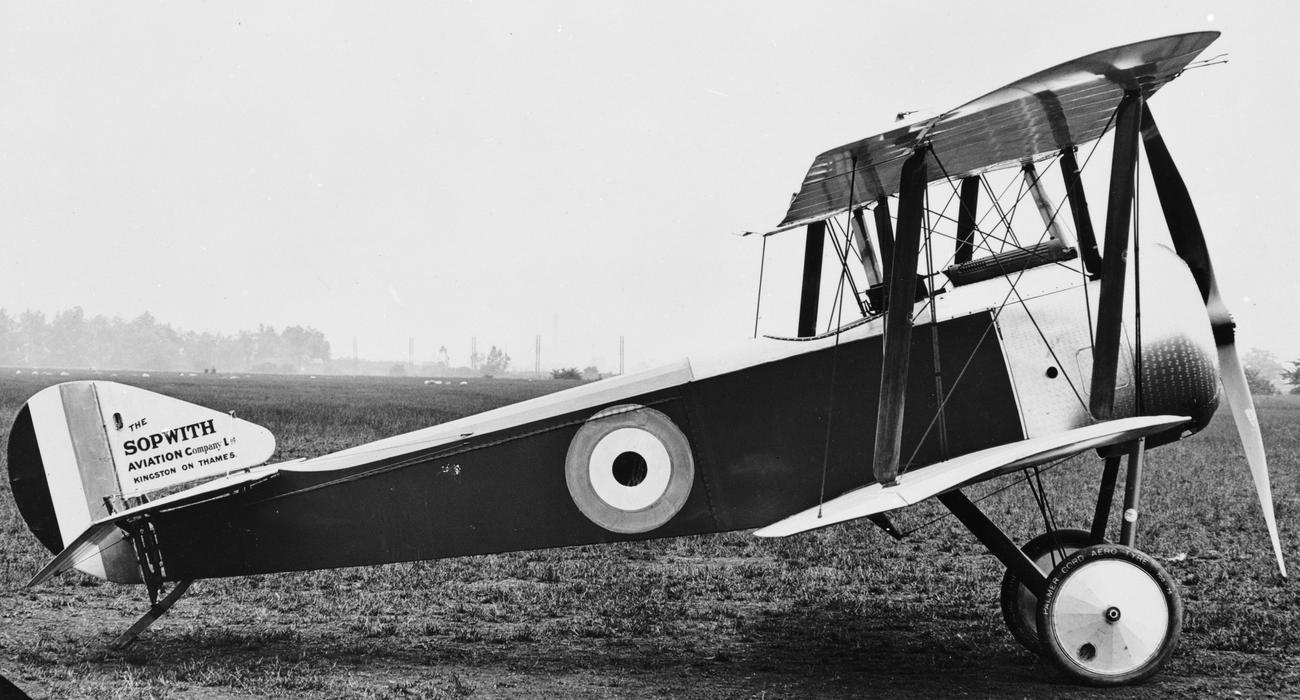
Side view of a Sopwith Pup

In May 1916, the RNAS received its first Pups for operational trials with "A" Naval Squadron. The first Pups reached the Western Front in October 1916 with No. 8 Squadron RNAS, and proved successful, with the squadron's Pups claiming 20 enemy machines destroyed in operations over the Somme battlefield by the end of the year. The first RFC Squadron to re-equip with the Pup was No. 54 Squadron, which arrived in France in December. The Pup quickly proved its superiority over the early Fokker, Halberstadt and Albatros biplanes. After encountering the Pup in combat, Manfred von Richthofen said, "We saw at once that the enemy aeroplane was superior to ours."

The Pup's light weight and generous wing area gave it a good rate of climb. Agility was enhanced by having ailerons on both wings. The Pup had half the horsepower and armament of the German Albatros D.III, but was much more manoeuvrable, especially over 15,000 ft (4,600 m) due to its low wing loading. Ace James McCudden stated that "When it came to manoeuvring, the Sopwith [Pup] would turn twice to an Albatros' once ... it was a remarkably fine machine for general all-round flying. It was so extremely light and well surfaced that after a little practice one could almost land it on a tennis court." However, the Pup was also longitudinally unstable.

At the peak of its operational deployment, the Pup equipped only four RNAS squadrons (Nos. 3, 4, 8 and 9), and three RFC squadrons (Nos. 54, 46 and 66). By the spring of 1917, the Pup had been outclassed by the newest German fighters. The RNAS replaced their Pups, first with Sopwith Triplanes, and then with Sopwith Camels. The RFC soldiered on with Pups, despite increasing casualties, until it was possible to replace them with Camels in December 1917.

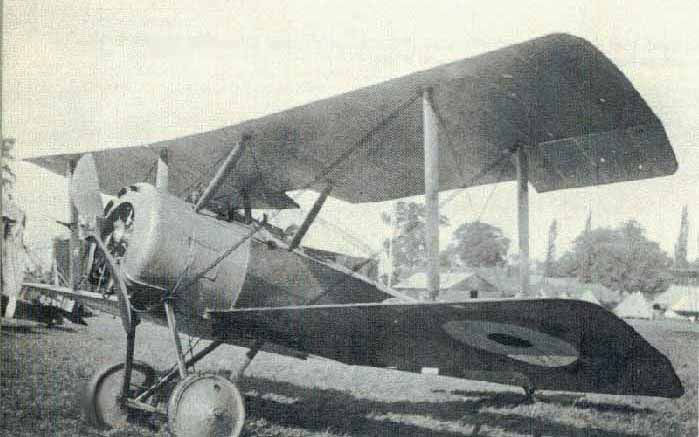
Pup with 100 hp Gnome Monosoupape engine

=== Home Defence duties ===
The raids on London by Gotha bombers in mid-1917 caused far more damage and casualties than the earlier airship raids. The ineffective response by British interceptor units had serious political repercussions. In response, No. 66 Squadron was withdrawn to Calais for a short period, and No. 46 was transferred for several weeks to Sutton's Farm airfield near London. Two new Pup squadrons were formed specifically for Home Defence duties, No. 112 in July, and No. 61 in August.

The first Pups delivered to Home Defence units utilised the 80 hp (60 kW) Le Rhône, but subsequent Home Defence Pups standardised on the more powerful 100 hp (75 kW) Gnome Monosoupape, which provided an improved rate of climb. These aircraft were distinguishable by the addition of vents in the cowling face. In 1917, the Admiralty acquired the Sopwith Pup.

=== Shipboard use ===
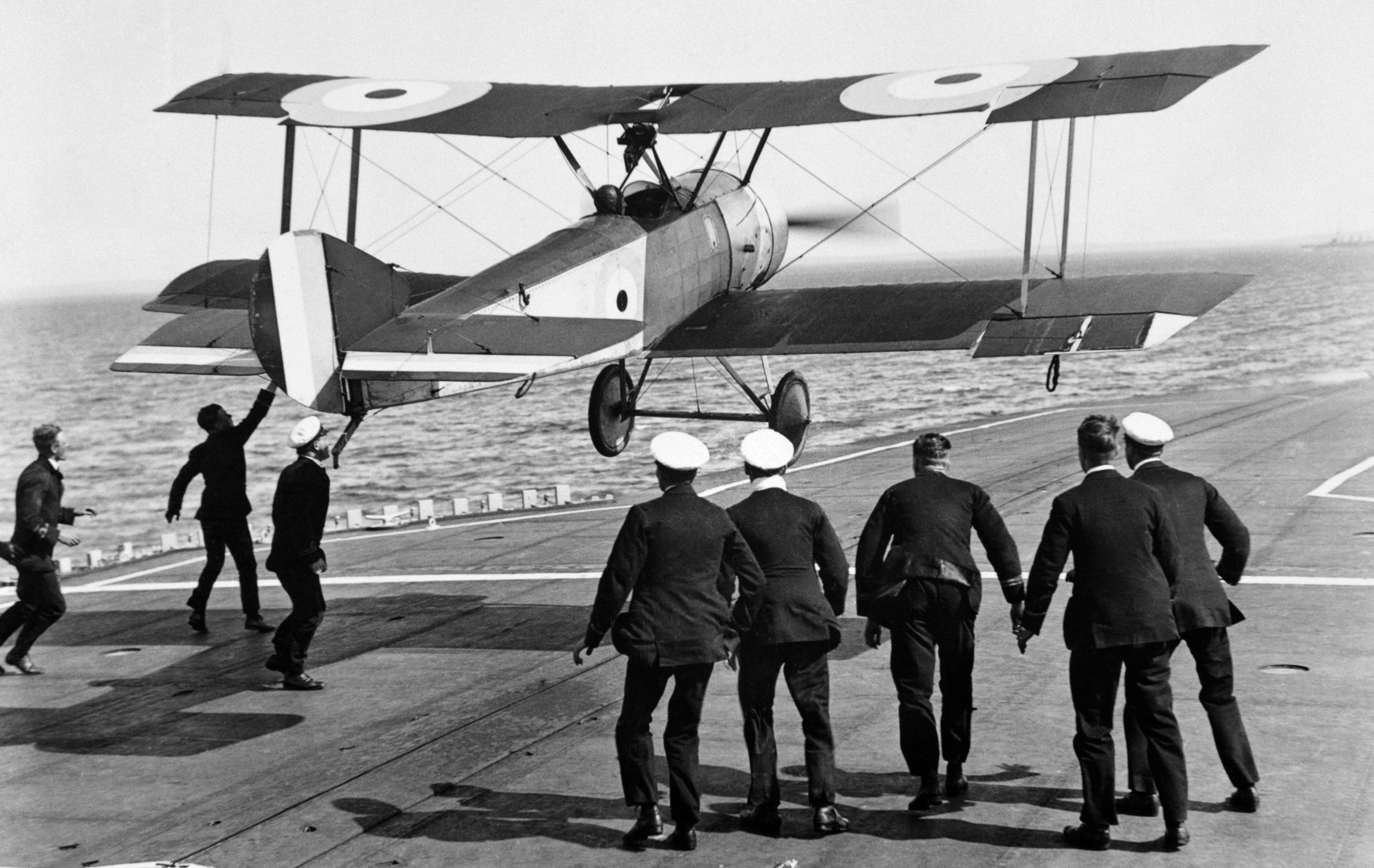
Sqn Cdr E. H. Dunning attempting a landing on HMS Furious in a Sopwith Pup (August 1917)

Sopwith Pups were also used in many pioneering carrier experiments. On 2 August 1917, a Pup flown by Sqn Cdr Edwin Harris Dunning became the first aircraft to land aboard a moving ship, HMS Furious. Dunning was killed on his third landing when the Pup fell over the side of the ship. The Pup began operations on the carriers in early 1917; the first aircraft were fitted with skid undercarriages in place of the standard landing gear. Landings utilised a system of deck wires to "trap" the aircraft. Later versions reverted to the normal undercarriage. Pups were used as ship-based fighters on three carriers: HMS Campania, Furious and Manxman. Some other Pups were deployed to cruisers and battleships where they were launched from platforms attached to gun turrets. A Pup flown from a platform on the cruiser HMS Yarmouth shot down the German Zeppelin L 23 off the Danish coast on 21 August 1917.

The U.S. Navy also employed the Sopwith Pup with Australian pilot Edgar Percival testing the use of carrier-borne fighters. In 1926, Percival flew a Pup from a platform on turret "B" on the battleship USS Idaho at Guantánamo Bay, Cuba prior to the ship undergoing a major refit that added catapults on the stern.

=== Training duties ===
The Pup saw extensive use as a trainer. Student pilots completing basic flight training in the Avro 504k often graduated to the Pup as advanced trainers. The Pup was also used in Fighting School units for instruction in combat techniques. Many training Pups were reserved by senior officers and instructors as their runabouts while a few survived in France as personal or squadron 'hacks' long after the type had been withdrawn from combat.

== Nomenclature ==
The Pup was officially named the Sopwith Scout. The "Pup" nickname arose because pilots considered it to be the "pup" of the larger two-seat Sopwith 1½ Strutter. The name never had official status as it was felt to be "undignified," but a precedent was set, and all later Sopwith types apart from the Triplane acquired animal names (Camel, Dolphin, Snipe etc.), which ended up with the Sopwith firm being said to have created a "flying zoo" during the First World War.

== Variants ==
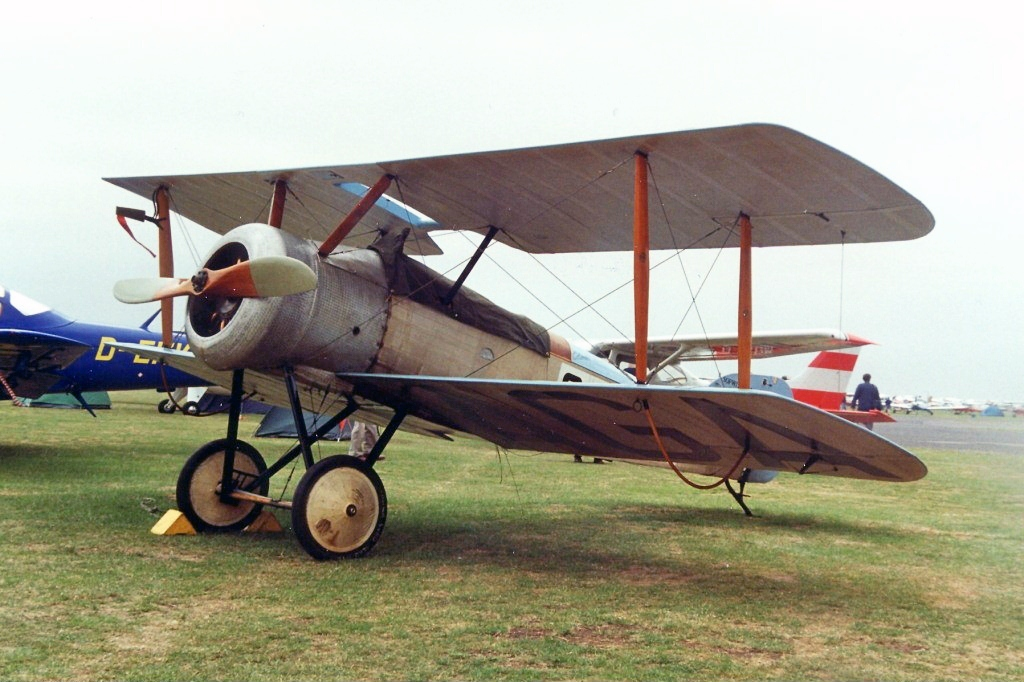
Sopwith Dove, the two seat civilian variant

Sopwith Admiralty Type 9901
Admiralty designation.
Sopwith Pup (official designation Sopwith Scout)
Single-seat scout (fighter) biplane; 1,770 built.
Sopwith Dove
Two-seat civilian biplane; ten built.
Alcock Scout
Aircraft built partially from the remains of a crashed Pup and other aircraft; one built.
Beardmore W.B.III
Shipboard variant designed to fold into smallest possible volume; 100 built.

== Operators ==
Australia

- Australian Flying Corps
  - No. 5 (Training) Squadron AFC in the United Kingdom.
  - No. 6 (Training) Squadron AFC in the United Kingdom.
  - No. 8 (Training) Squadron AFC in the United Kingdom.
  - Central Flying School AFC at Point Cook, Victoria
- Royal Australian Air Force
  - No. 1 Flying Training School RAAF at Point Cook, Victoria

Belgium

- Belgium Air Force
  - 5me Escadrille de Chasse

Greece

- Hellenic Navy

Japan

- Imperial Japanese Army
- Imperial Japanese Navy

Netherlands

- Royal Netherlands Air Force

Romania

- Romanian Air Corps

Russian Empire

- Imperial Russian Air Force

Soviet Union

- Soviet Air Force – ex-Imperial Russian Air Force.

United Kingdom

- Royal Flying Corps / Royal Air Force

- No. 36 Squadron RAF
- No. 46 Squadron RAF
- No. 50 Squadron RAF
- No. 54 Squadron RAF
- No. 61 Squadron RAF
- No. 64 Squadron RAF
- No. 65 Squadron RAF
- No. 66 Squadron RAF
- No. 81 Squadron RAF
- No. 87 Squadron RAF
- No. 89 Squadron RAF
- No. 92 Squadron RAF
- No. 112 Squadron RAF
- No. 141 Squadron RAF
- No. 187 Squadron RAF
- No. 188 Squadron RAF
- No. 189 Squadron RAF
- No. 203 Squadron RAF

- Royal Naval Air Service

United States

- United States Navy

== Surviving aircraft ==
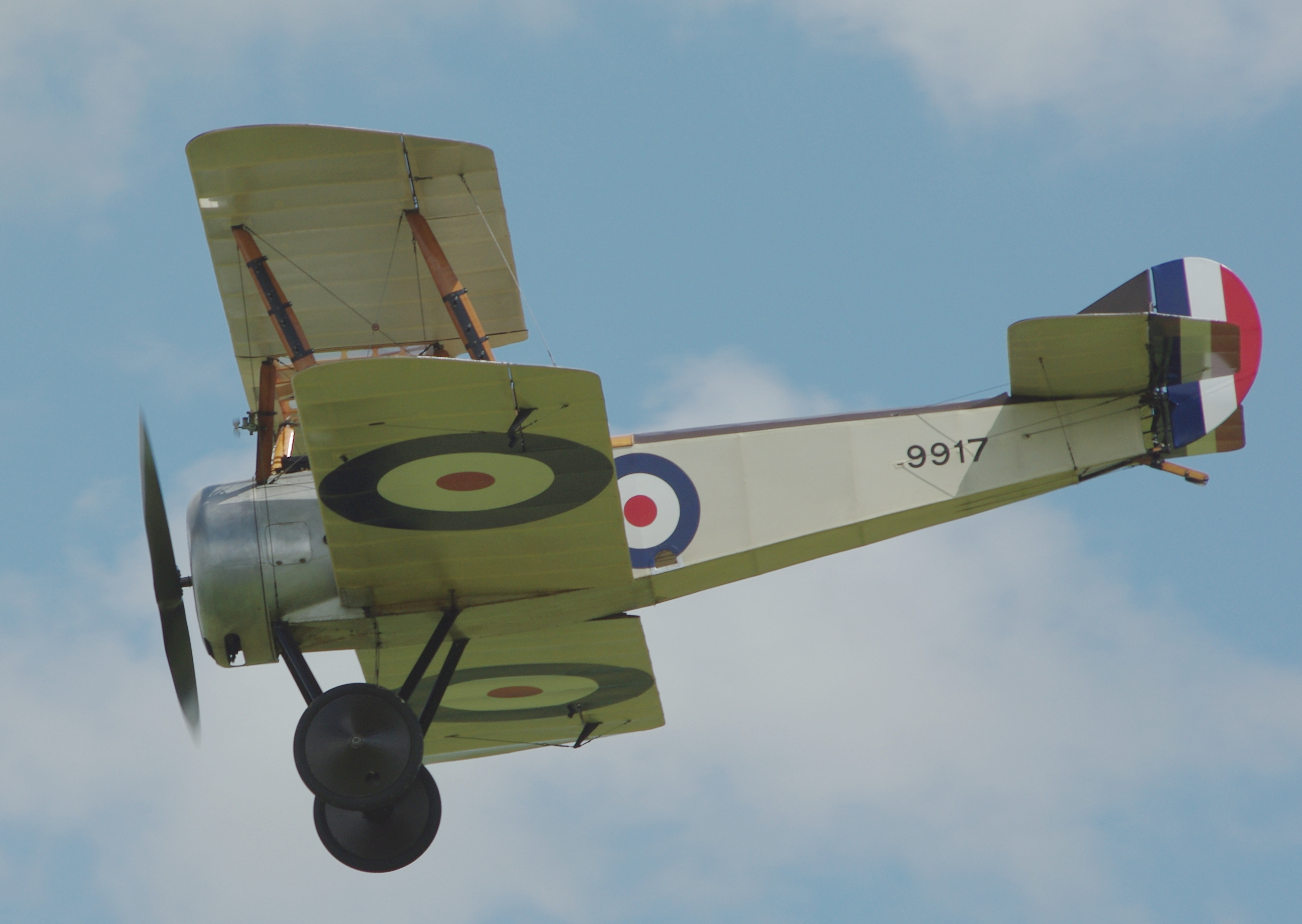
The Shuttleworth Collection Sopwith Pup in flight

- B1807 – Pup under restoration to airworthy condition. Built by Standard Motors in 1917 and delivered to a Home Defence squadron. This aircraft was originally fitted with a 100 hp (75 kW) Gnome Monosoupape engine, along with the distinctive three-quarter vented cowling. It was refitted by the 80 hp (60 kW) Le Rhône engine sometime in 1918. B1807 was sold at Croydon in 1920 and entered the civil register as G-EAVX. It appeared on 16 July at the 1921 Aerial Derby at Hendon, where it was groundlooped by its pilot. The wings were removed and the fuselage disappeared until 1973, when the current owner discovered the remains of the aircraft in a barn in Dorset.
- N5182 – Pup on static display at the Royal Air Force Museum Cosford in Cosford, Shropshire. Built by Sopwith Aviation Co. at Kingston upon Thames in 1916. N5182 was operated by several RNAS squadrons in Belgium and Northern France. It was flown by the noted aces Edward Grange and Robert A. Little, both of whom scored victories with the aircraft. A private collector acquired N5182 from the French Air Force in 1959 and restored it to airworthy condition. N5182 was acquired by the museum in 1982.
- N5195 – Pup on static display at the Museum of Army Flying in Middle Wallop, Hampshire. Served in the Royal Naval Air Service in France.
- 3004/14 – Dove maintained in airworthy condition by the Shuttleworth Collection in Old Warden, Bedfordshire. Delivered in 1919 as a 2-seater Dove, then converted to Pup configuration in the 1930s. It is powered by a Le Rhône 9C rotary engine. In 2004/5 the aircraft was extensively refurbished in the colours of 9917, a Beardmore-built aircraft which was fitted with Le Prieur rockets when it served for a time on HMS Manxman, a seaplane carrier. It is registered as G-EBKY.

== Specifications (80 hp Le Rhône) ==
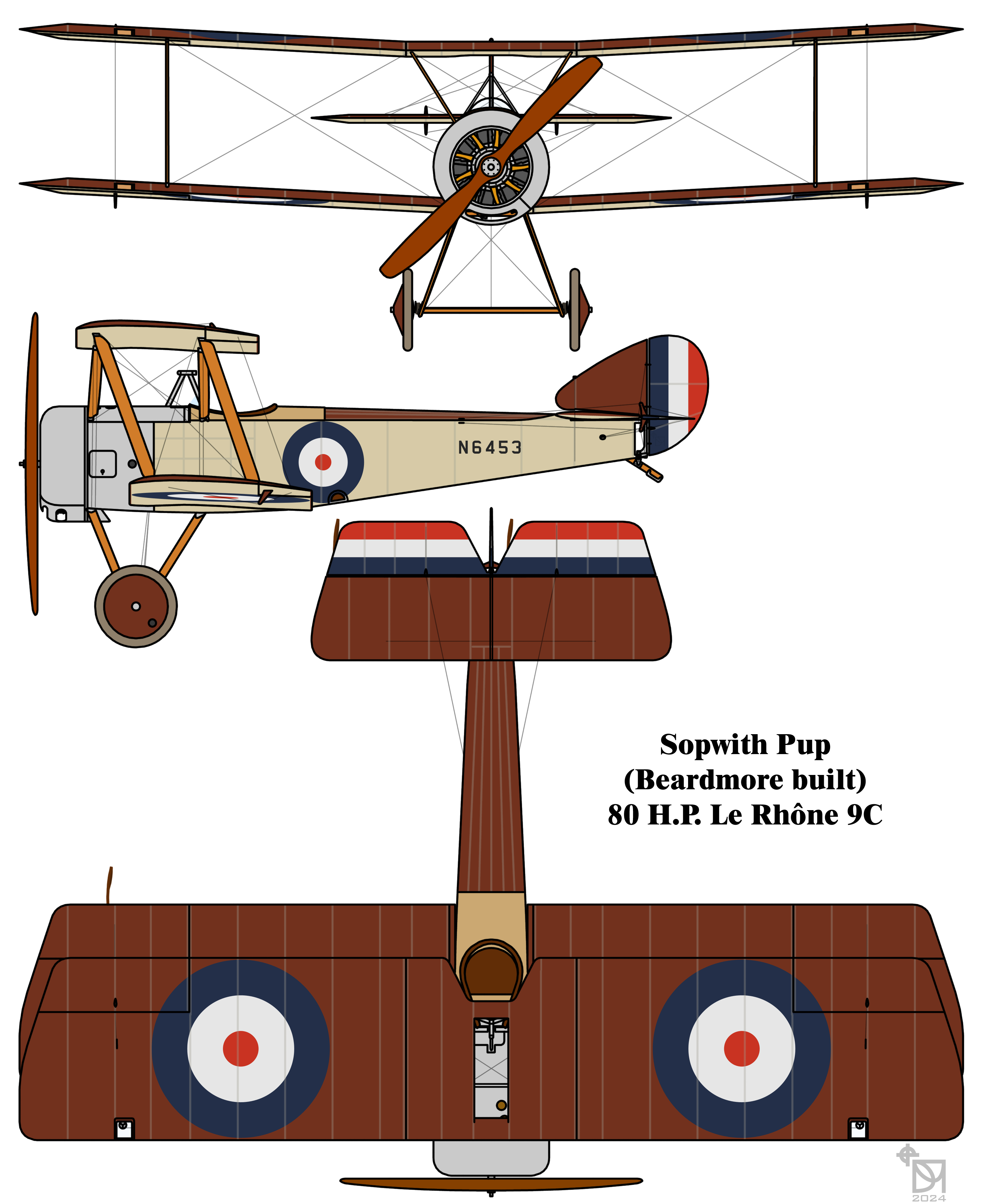
Colour 3-view drawing of Beardmore-built Sopwith Pup N6453, flown by Sqn Cmdr Dunning for first aircraft landing on an aircraft carrier on 2 August 1917.

Data from British Naval Aircraft since 1912.

General characteristics

- Crew: 1
- Length: 19 ft 3.75 in (5.8865 m)
- Wingspan: 26 ft 6 in (8.08 m)
- Height: 9 ft 5 in (2.87 m)
- Wing area: 254 sq ft (23.6 m^{2})
- Empty weight: 787 lb (357 kg)
- Gross weight: 1,225 lb (556 kg)
- Powerplant: 1 × Le Rhône 9C 9-cylinder air-cooled rotary piston engine, 80 hp (60 kW)
- Propellers: 2-bladed wooden fixed-pitch propeller

Performance

- Maximum speed: 112 mph (180 km/h, 97 kn)
- Range: 337 mi (542 km, 293 nmi)
- Endurance: 3 hours
- Service ceiling: 17,500 ft (5,300 m)
- Time to altitude:

10,000 ft (3,048 m) in 14 minutes
16,100 ft (4,907 m) in 35 minutes

- Wing loading: 4.8 lb/sq ft (23 kg/m^{2})
- Power/mass: 0.0654 hp/lb (0.1075 kW/kg)

Armament

- Guns: 1 × .303 in (7.7 mm) Vickers machine gun fired forward through the propeller by means of a Sopwith-Kauper gun synchronizer

== See also ==
Related development

- Sopwith Camel

Aircraft of comparable role, configuration, and era

- Bristol Scout
- Fokker D.II
- Halberstadt D.II
- Nieuport 17

Related lists

- List of aircraft of the Royal Air Force
- List of aircraft of the Royal Flying Corps
- List of aircraft of the Royal Naval Air Service
- List of fighter aircraft
