= Fairey Campania =

Carrier-borne patrol and reconnaissance biplane

Campania
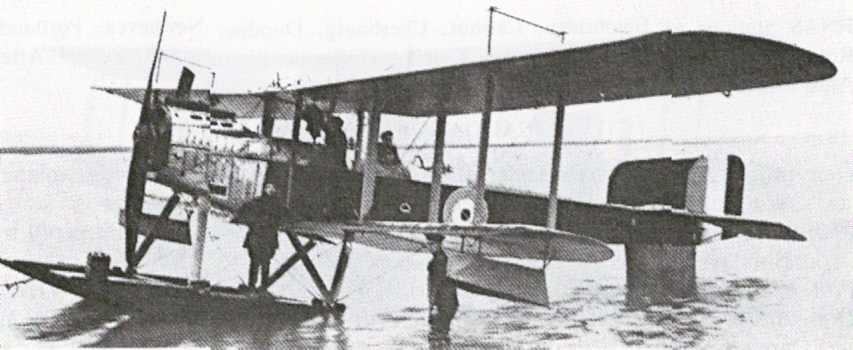
- Fairey F.22 Campania N1006 at Calshot, England

General information
- Type: Carrier-borne patrol and reconnaissance aircraft
- Manufacturer: Fairey Aviation
- Primary users: Royal Naval Air Service Royal Air Force
- Number built: 62

History
- First flight: 16 February 1917
- Retired: August 1919

The Fairey Campania was a British ship-borne, patrol and reconnaissance aircraft of the First World War and Russian Civil War. It was a single-engine, two-seat biplane with twin main floats and backward-folding wings. The Campania was the first aeroplane ever designed specifically for carrier operations.

== Development ==
The Royal Navy was an early leader in carrier aviation and in the autumn of 1914, purchased the liner Campania for conversion into a seaplane carrier. Operating seaplanes required the carrier to stop to hoist the aircraft out- and in-board by crane, leaving the ship exceedingly vulnerable to U-boat attacks and the Admiralty began to seek alternatives. By the middle of 1916, Campania had been fitted with a 200 ft (61 m) flight deck forward on which, experiments were being carried out in launching aircraft. The Admiralty issued a specification for a purpose-built, two-seat patrol and reconnaissance aircraft.

Fairey Aviation designed a single-engined tractor biplane of fabric-covered wooden construction, which first flew on 16 February 1917. The two-bay wings folded rearwards for storage, the crew of two sat in separate cockpits, the observer being provided with a Lewis gun on a Scarff ring. The first of two prototypes, F.16, was powered by a 250 hp (190 kW) Rolls-Royce Eagle IV and the second prototype, powered by an Eagle V of 275 hp (205 kW), was named F.17. Both prototypes were later flown operationally from Scapa Flow.

== Operational history ==
Trials proving satisfactory, the type went into production and service. Most of the F.17s shipped aboard the carriers HMS Campania, HMS Nairana and HMS Pegasus; the first aircraft joined Campania and the type took its name from her. Only Campania possessed a flight deck; Campanias operated from this using jettisonable, wheeled bogies fitted to the floats. The aircraft in the other ships took off from the water in the normal way.

The 27 F.22s operated from Royal Naval Air Service air stations. The Campania had an undistinguished career, but performed useful work as a spotter aeroplane.

On 1 August 1918, during the North Russia Campaign in support of the British intervention in the Russian Civil War, Campanias from Nairana participated in what was probably the first fully combined air, sea, and land military operation in history, joining Allied ground forces and ships in driving Bolsheviks out of their fortifications on Modyugski Island at the mouth of the Northern Dvina River in Russia, then scouting ahead of the Allied force as it proceeded up the channel to Arkhangelsk. The appearance of one of the Campanias over Arkhangelsk induced the Bolshevik leaders there to panic and flee. Campanias from Nairana then operated against the Bolsheviks from Arkhangelsk, as well as against the White Finnish defensive positions in Uhtua in the autumn of 1918 from Kem.

The Campania was declared obsolete in August 1919.

== Variants ==
- F.16 – 250 hp (190 kW) Rolls-Royce Eagle IV
- F.17 – 275 hp (205 kW) Rolls-Royce Eagle V or 345 hp (257 kW) Eagle III
- F.22 – 260 hp (194 kW) Sunbeam Maori II

== Operators ==
United Kingdom

- Royal Air Force
  - No. 240 Squadron RAF
  - No. 241 Squadron RAF
  - No. 253 Squadron RAF
- Royal Naval Air Service

== Specifications (F.22) ==
Data from Fairey Aircraft since 1915

General characteristics

- Crew: 2
- Length: 43 ft 1 in (13.13 m)
- Wingspan: 61 ft 7 in (18.77 m)
- Height: 15 ft 1 in (4.60 m)
- Wing area: 674.6 sq ft (62.67 m^{2})
- Empty weight: 3,672 lb (1,666 kg)
- Gross weight: 5,329 lb (2,417 kg)
- Powerplant: 1 × Sunbeam Maori II V-12 water-cooled piston engine, 260 hp (190 kW)
- Propellers: 2-bladed fixed-pitch propeller

Performance

- Maximum speed: 85 mph (137 km/h, 74 kn)
- Endurance: 4 hours 30 minutes
- Service ceiling: 6,000 ft (1,800 m)
- Time to altitude: 2,000 ft (610 m) in 7 minutes
- Wing loading: 7.90 lb/sq ft (38.6 kg/m^{2})
- Power/mass: 0.049 hp/lb (0.081 kW/kg)

Armament

- Guns: 1 × .303 in (7.7 mm) Lewis Gun on Scarff ring in rear cockpit
- Bombs: Up to 6 × 116 lb (53 kg) bombs under wings and fuselage.

== See also ==
Related lists

- List of aircraft of the Royal Air Force
- List of aircraft of the Royal Naval Air Service
- List of flying boats and floatplanes
