= List of ferries of Australia =

Ferry	Operational Years	Operating	Destinations
MS Abel Tasman	1985–1993	No	Melbourne <-> Devonport
PS Alert	1878–1893	No	Melbourne <-> Geelong
SS Awaroa	1915–1918	No	Melbourne <-> Sorrento <-> Portsea <-> Queenscliff
PS Black Eagle	1854–1872	No	Melbourne <-> St Kilda <-> Brighton <-> Mornington
SS Balgowlah	1912–1951	No	Sydney <-> Manly
MV Baragoola	1922–1983	No	Sydney <-> Manly
SS Charlotte Fenwick	1903–1913	No	Melbourne <-> Sorrento <-> Portsea <-> Queenscliff
MV Collaroy	1988–present	Yes	Sydney <-> Manly
SS Coogee	1903–1913	No	Melbourne <-> Launceston (and briefly Melbourne <-> Geelong)
ACV Courier	1986-1987	No	Melbourne <-> Rosebud <-> Portarlington
SS Courier	1888–1927	No	Melbourne <-> Geelong
MV Curl Curl (1972)	1973–1991	No	Sydney <-> Manly
SS Despatch	1869–1911	No	Sorrento <-> Portsea <-> Queenscliff
MV Dee Why (1972)	1972–1985	No	Sydney <-> Manly
MV Devil Cat (1st)	1997–1998; 1999–2002	No	Melbourne <-> George Town
MV Devil Cat (2nd)	1998–1999	No	Melbourne <-> George Town
SS Edina	1880–1938	No	Melbourne <-> Geelong
SS Excelsior (1883)	1883–1919	No	Melbourne <-> Geelong
SS Express	1854–1862	No	Melbourne <-> Geelong
MS Australian Trader	1985–1993	No	Sydney <-> Hobart
MS Empress of Australia	1965–1985	No	Melbourne <-> Devonport
MV Fairlight (1966)	1966–1984	No	Sydney <-> Manly
MV J.J. Farnsworth (1984)	1984–2003	No	Sorrento <-> Portsea <-> Queenscliff
MV Freshwater	1984–present	Yes	Sydney <-> Manly
PS Golden Crown	1874–1888	No	Melbourne <-> Queenscliff
PS Hygeia (1890)	1890–1931	No	Melbourne <-> Sorrento <-> Portsea <-> Queenscliff
MV Hygeia (1962)	1962–2004	No	Sorrento <-> Portsea <-> Queenscliff
SS Karatta	1907–1961	No	Port Adelaide <-> Kingscote
MV Komuta	1955–1965	No	Sorrento <-> Portsea <-> Queenscliff
SS Koompartoo	1922–1932	No	Sydney Harbour
SS Kuttabul	1922–1932	No	Sydney Harbour
MV Judith Ann	1953–1955	No	Sorrento <-> Portsea <-> Queenscliff
MV Lady Cutler	1969–1991	No	Sydney Harbour
MV Lady Denman	1912-1979	No	Sydney Harbour
MV Lady McKell	1970–1991	No	Sydney Harbour
MV Lady Woodward	1970–1991	No	Sydney Harbour
MV Long Reef (1978)	1978–1984	No	Sydney <-> Manly
PS Lonsdale	1883–1889	No	Sorrento <-> Queenscliff
SS Loongana (1903)	1912–1935	No	Melbourne <-> Launceston
MV Manly (1965)	1965–1980	No	Sydney <-> Manly
MV Manly (1984)	1984–1991	No	Sydney <-> Manly
PS Mystery	1867–1872	No	Melbourne <-> Geelong
SS Nairana	1920–1948	No	Melbourne <-> Devonport and Melbourne <-> Burnie
MV Narrabeen	1984–present	Yes	Sydney <-> Manly
MV Nepean	1965–2004	No	Sorrento <-> Portsea <-> Queenscliff
PS Ozone	1886–1925	No	Sorrento <-> Portsea <-> Queenscliff
MV Palm Beach (1975)	1975–1984	No	Sydney <-> Manly
SS Perth	1914–1970	No	Swan River, Perth. Converted to MV Perth in 1970.
MV Perth	1970–1982, 1986	No	Swan River, Perth.
MV Peninsula Princess	1987–1993	No	Queenscliff <-> Sorrento
MS Princess of Tasmania	1959–1972	No	Melbourne <-> Devonport
MV Queenscliff (1983)	1983–present	Yes	Sydney <-> Manly
MV Queenscliff (1992)	1993–present	Yes	Queenscliff <-> Sorrento
SS Reliance	1916–1943	No	Melbourne <-> Sorrento <-> Portsea <-> Queenscliff
SS Rotomahana (1879)	1879–1921	No	Melbourne <-> Launceston
PS Seahorse	1842–1843	No	Melbourne <-> Launceston
Sealion 2000 (Kangaroo Island SeaLink)	1997–present (New Vessels in 2024)	Yes	Cape Jervis <-> Penneshaw, Kangaroo Island
PS Shamrock	1843–1851	No	Melbourne <-> Launceston
SS Sorrento (1946)	1946–1949	No	Queenscliff <-> Sorrento
MV Sorrento (2001)	2001–present	Yes	Queenscliff <-> Sorrento
SS South Steyne	1938–1974	No	Sydney <-> Manly
MV Sydney (1985)	1985–1991	No	Sydney <-> Manly
MV Sun (ferry)	1942–present	Yes	Brooklyn, New South Wales <-> Dangar Island
MS Spirit of Tasmania	1993–2002	No	Melbourne <-> Devonport
SeaCat Tasmania	1991–1992	No	Port Welshpool <-> George Town
Spirit of Kangaroo Island (Kangaroo Island SeaLink)	2001–present (New Vessels 2024)	Yes	Cape Jervis <-> Penneshaw, Kangaroo Island
MS Spirit of Tasmania I	2002–present	Yes	Geelong <-> Devonport
MS Spirit of Tasmania II	2002–present	Yes	Geelong <-> Devonport
MS Spirit of Tasmania III	2004–2006	No	Sydney <-> Devonport
SS Taroona	1934–1959	No	Melbourne <–> Beauty Point <–> Devonport and Melbourne <-> Burnie
MV Troubridge	1961–1987	No	Port Adelaide <-> Kingscote and Port Adelaide <-> Port Lincoln
MV Valdura	1912–1967	No	Swan river
PS Weeroona (1910)	1910–1942	No	Melbourne <-> Sorrento <-> Portsea <-> Queenscliff
MV Weeroona (1958)	1958–1972	No	Sorrento <-> Portsea <-> Queenscliff
PS Williams	1872–1894	No	Melbourne <-> Geelong
First Fleet (Sydney Ferries)	1985–present	Yes	Sydney Harbour
Rivercat (Sydney Ferries)	1992–present	Yes	Sydney <-> Parramatta
Supercat (Sydney Ferries)	2000–2024	Yes	Sydney Harbour
Raymond Island ferry	Various vessels since 1889, current vessel since 1997	Yes	Raymond Island <-> Paynesville
North Stradbroke Island Ferries	1964–present	Yes	Moreton Bay Various vessels Roll on Roll off Cleveland to Dunwich North Stradbroke Island

== See also ==
- List of Sydney Harbour ferries
- Transdev Sydney Ferries
- Sydney Ferries
- Murray River crossings
- List of Hobart ferries
