= Transport in South Australia =

Transport in South Australia is provided by a mix of road, rail, sea and air transport. The capital city of Adelaide is the centre to transport in the state. With its population of 1.4 million people, it has the majority of the state's 1.7 million inhabitants. Adelaide has the state's major airport and sea port.

Road transport is predominant in the state. Its extensive road network connect the state's regional centres and other towns, few of which have populations greater than 10,000. Private cars are a dominant form of transport throughout.

Adelaide is an isolated city with Melbourne, the nearest city, being 800 km away. This makes air transport an important form of travel to other cities.

The state is a land transport hub between the eastern states of Australia, Western Australia and the Northern Territory. The town of Port Augusta at the top of the Spencer Gulf is the only railway link, and one of only two sealed road links from the eastern states. Most major surface freight passes through this town.

== History ==
South Australia was settled in 1836, and at this time there were no roads. Colonial trade relied heavily on break bulk shipping on the seas while overland trade relied heavily horses and bullock trains. In the arid north of the state, camel trains were a common form of transport. Horses, bullocks and camels remained as common forms of transport in remote areas until trucks became widely available following the Second World War.

A thriving coastal trade rapidly developed with commodities from rural ports being transported to Adelaide. Initially ships were loaded from the shore, sometimes by beaching a ship at high tide so that it could be loaded direct form carts at low tide and sailed off on the subsequent high tide. With its lack of natural harbours and relatively calm gulf waters, jetties came to play an important role. These jetties are now a distinctive feature of many South Australian towns and the coastline of Adelaide. South Australia came to play an important role in the clipper ship trade collecting bulk goods from South Australia's coastal ports and transporting them to Europe. The state became a last stand of the clipper industry, with the last trade dying out in the 1950s. The coastal trade involving sailing ketches only ended in the early 1980s with the Nelcebee and the Falie being the last two ships to participate in the coastal trade.

As steam technology developed in the mid 19th century. Steam trains and paddle steamers came to play an important role in transport.

The early rail network began in 1854 connecting Port Elliot to Goolwa, a major port on the Murray River steamer route, via a horse-drawn tramway. A second railway was added connecting Adelaide and Port Adelaide in 1856. The railway was extended to Murray Bridge, also on the steamer route. A new bridge at Murray Bridge connected Adelaide to Melbourne in 1886. The rail network rapidly expanded to cover much of the state.

Paddle steamers provided effective bulk transport for agricultural goods on the Murray River giving access to inland regions and into Victoria and New South Wales.

In the mid 20th century, changes in transport technology, especially with respect to roads, road vehicles and cargo handling, saw increasing competition for the traditional railways and ports. Many minor railways were closed down, and Port Adelaide saw its cargo increasingly funnelled into the container port at Outer Harbour.

South Australia now sees much transport development focused on roads transport. Ports also play an important role for bulk goods although this is now concentrated in a handful of ports. Rail transport is important for containerised and bulk transport interstate and continues to play a minor role in public transport within Adelaide.

Historical Transport in South Australia

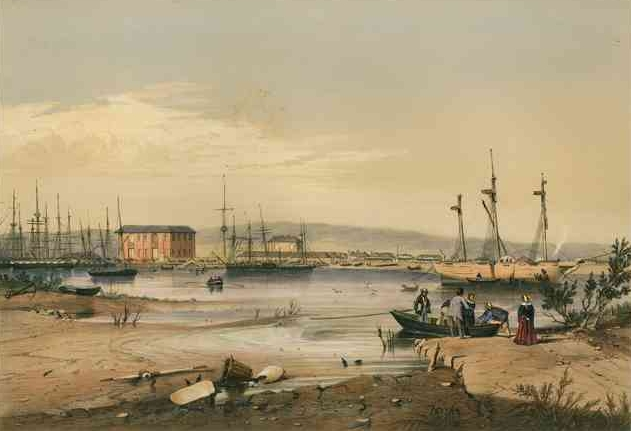
George French Angas, Port Adelaide in 1846, 10 years after settlement.

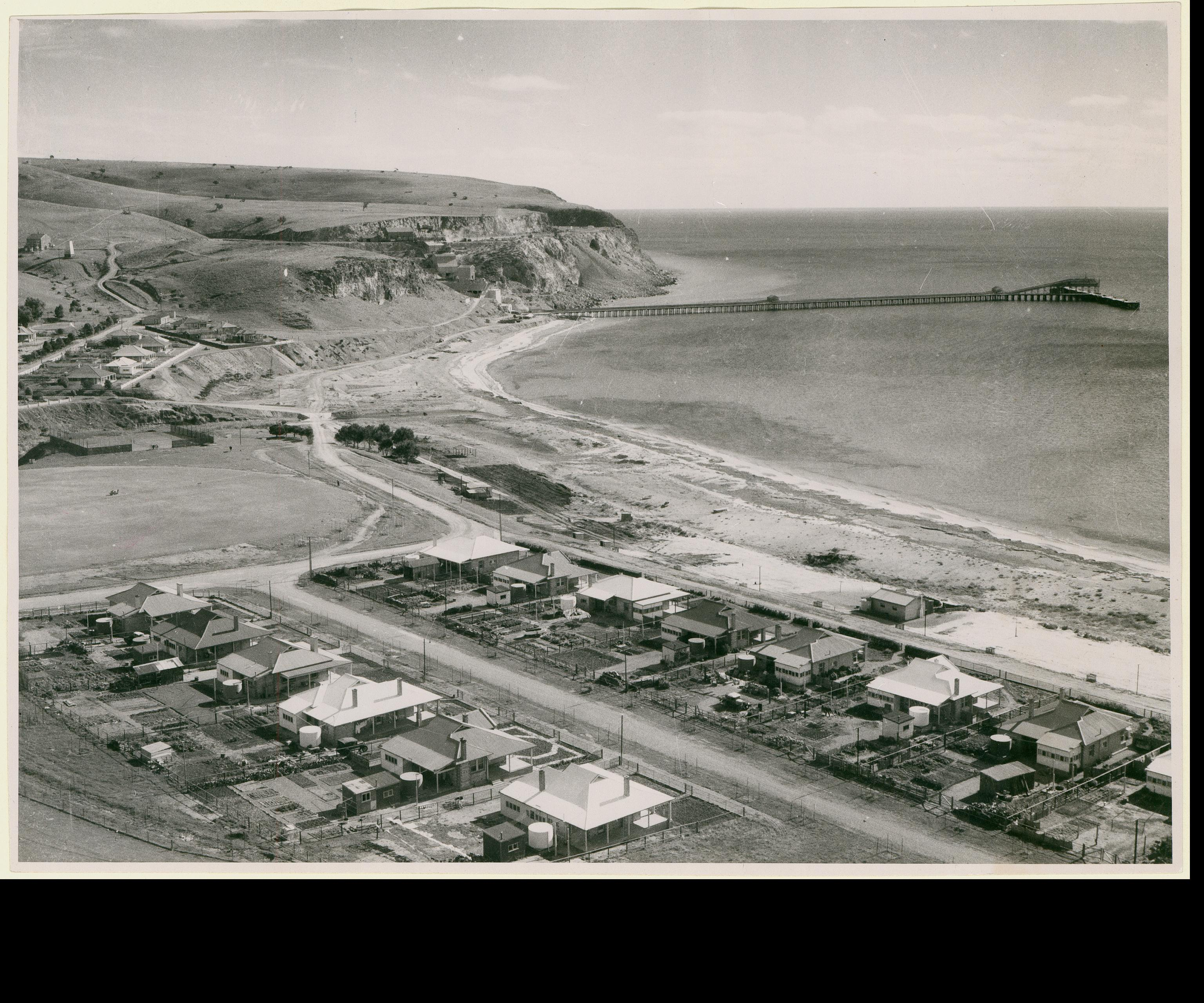
Rapid Bay, South Australia in 1950 with its limestone quarry and jetty for loading limestone onto ships

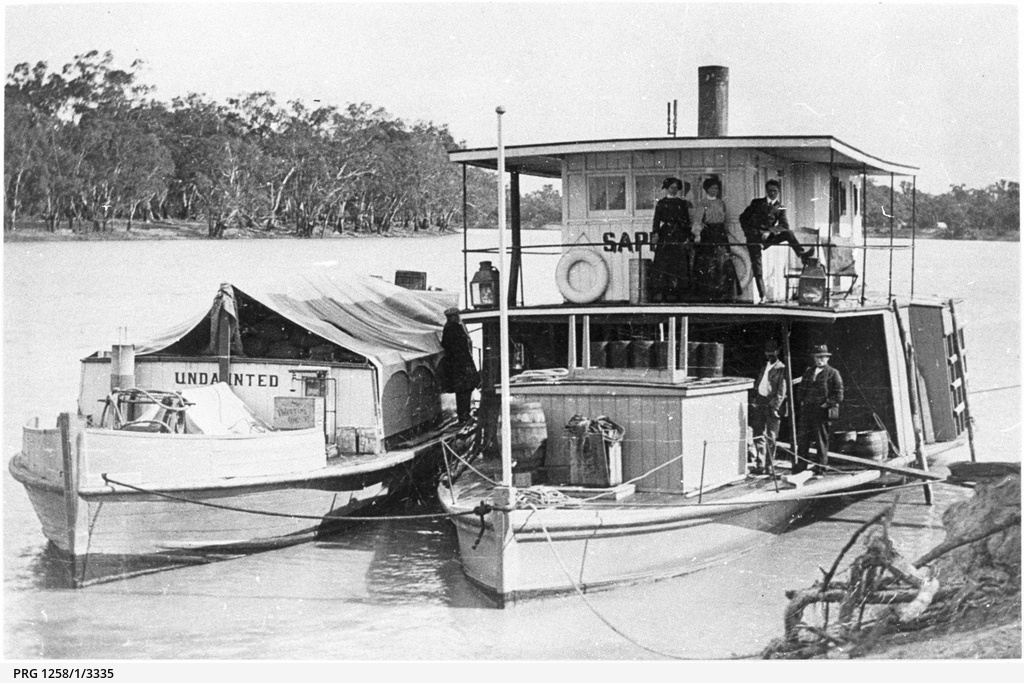
The Paddle Steamer P. S. Sapphire on the Murray River with a barge.

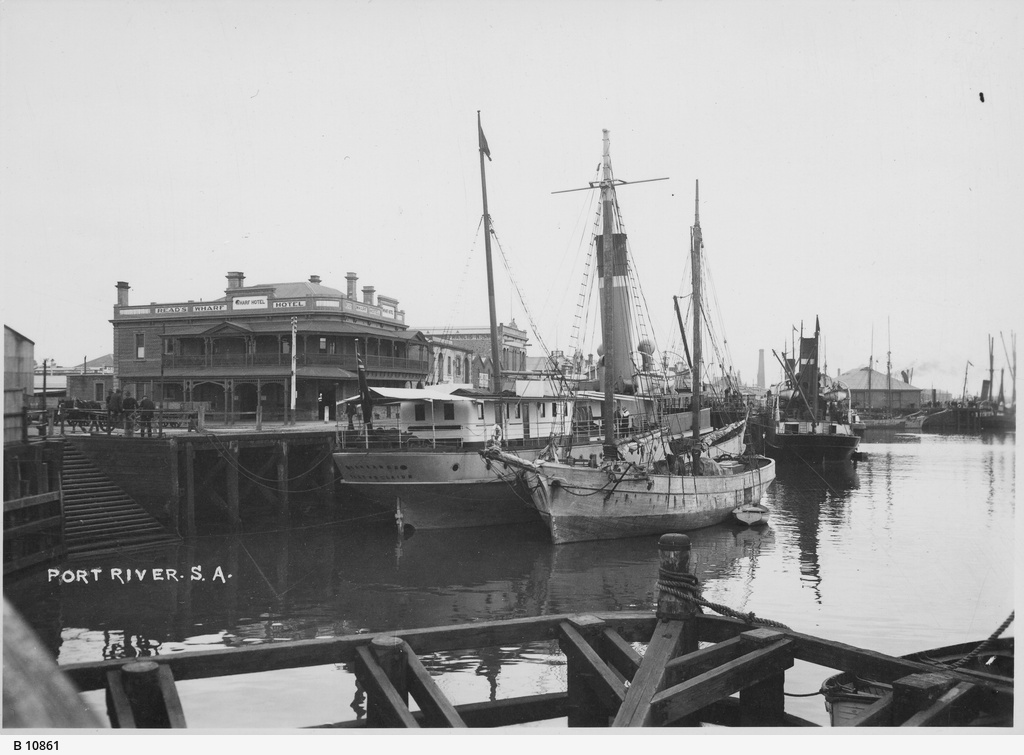
Ships docked at Port Adelaide in 1910.

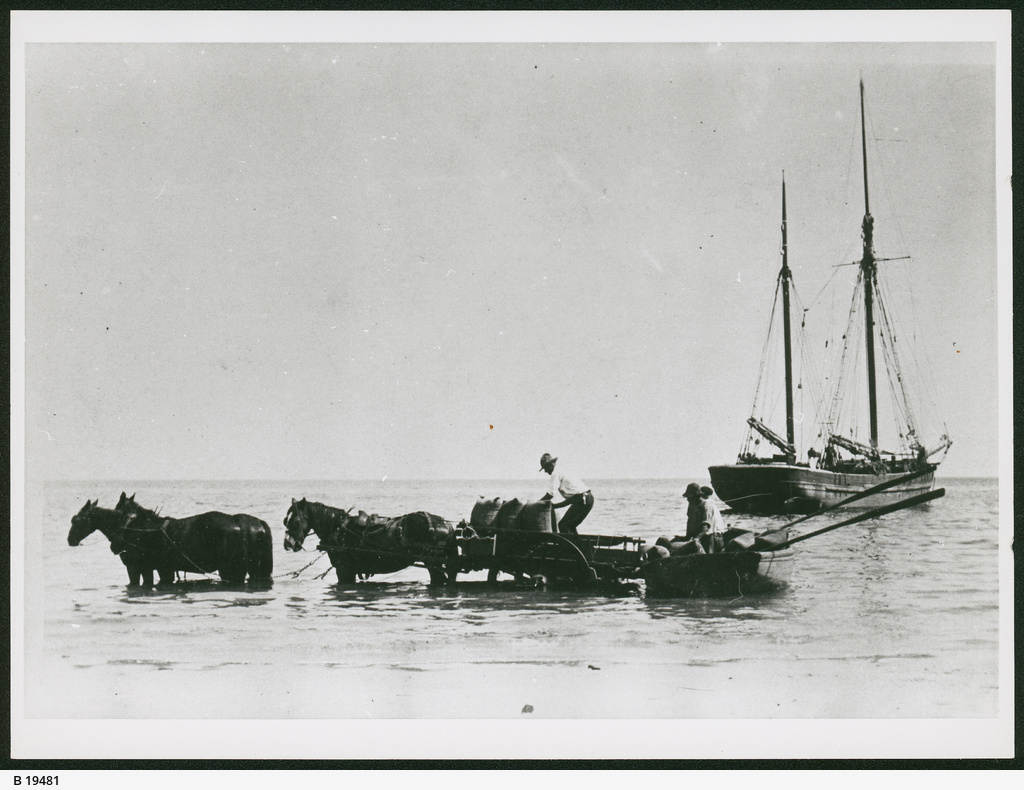
Loading grain from horse drawn wagons to the ketch 'Free Selector' on Kangaroo Island

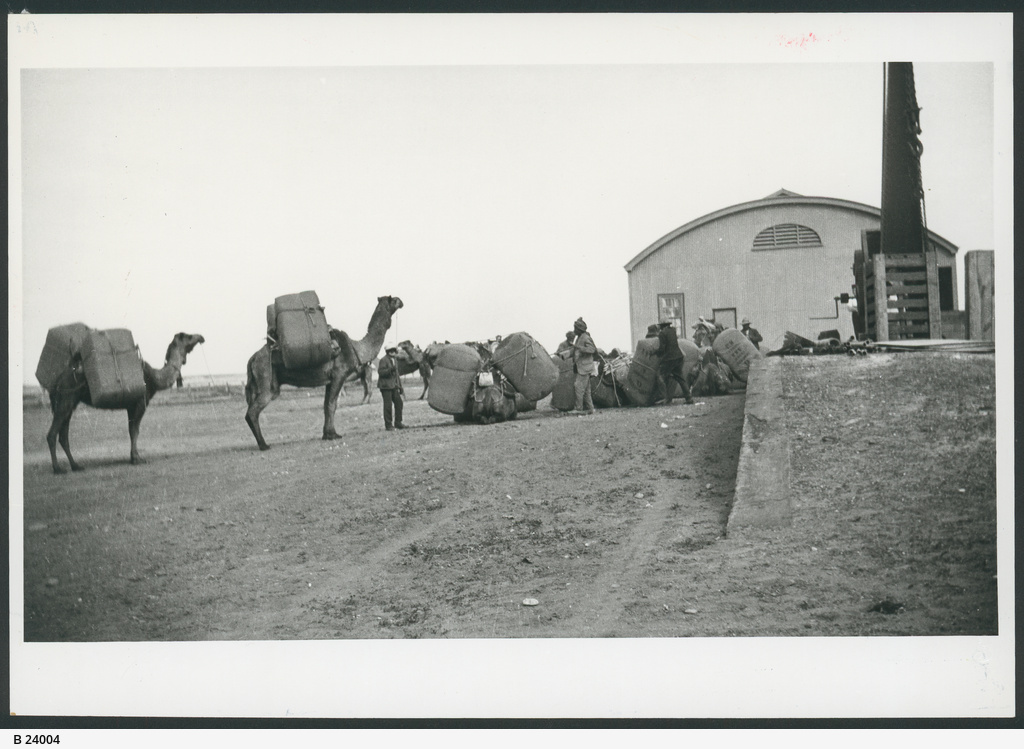
Camel train, with wool from Nappamerry being unloaded at the Railway Station, 1928.

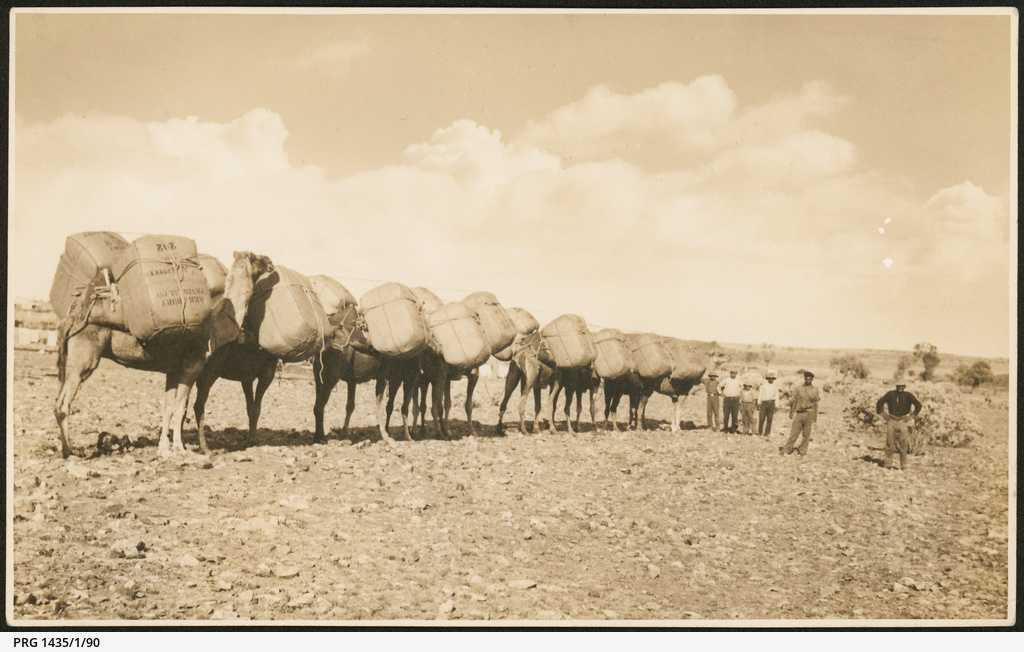
A camel train in the desert, with each of the camels loaded with two bales of wool from Arrabura Station, 1931.

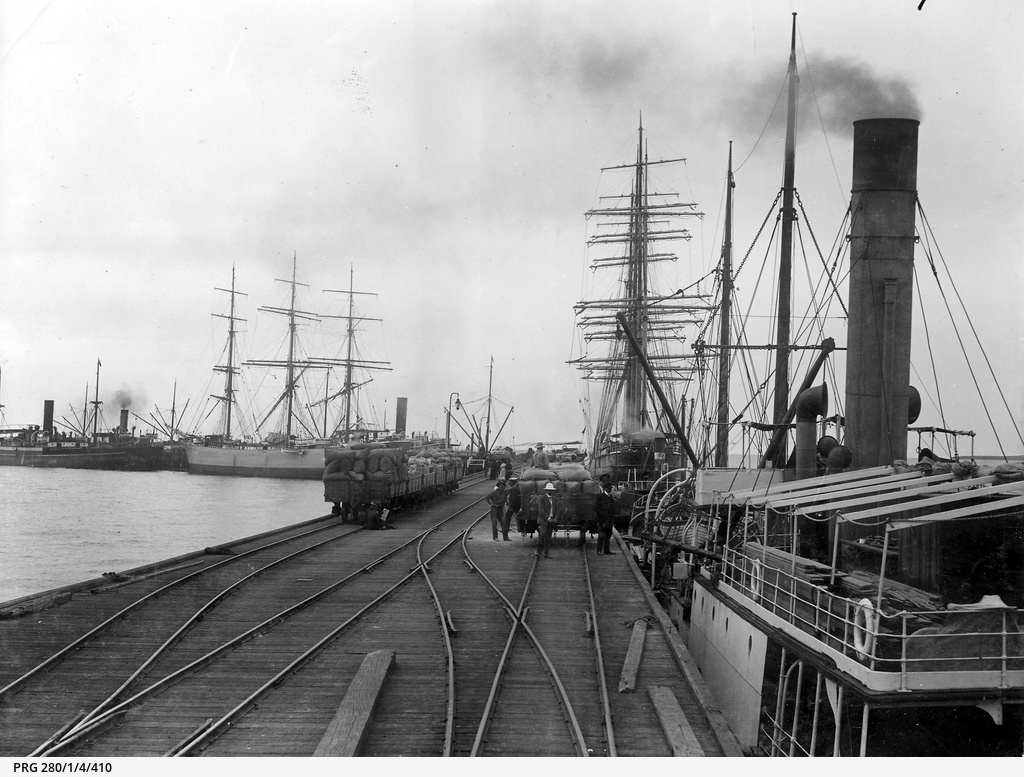
Wallaroo jetty in 1909, showing shipping, launches, and grain waiting for loading.

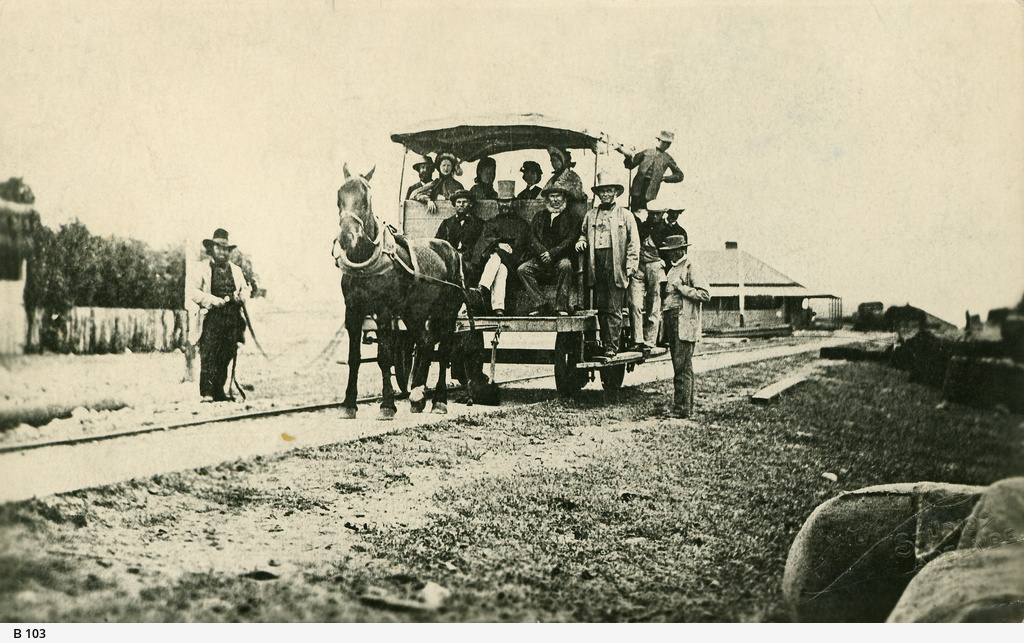
Goolwa to Port Elliot tramway circa 1860.

500 class engine No.502 hauling a freight train in at Eden Hills, August 1953.

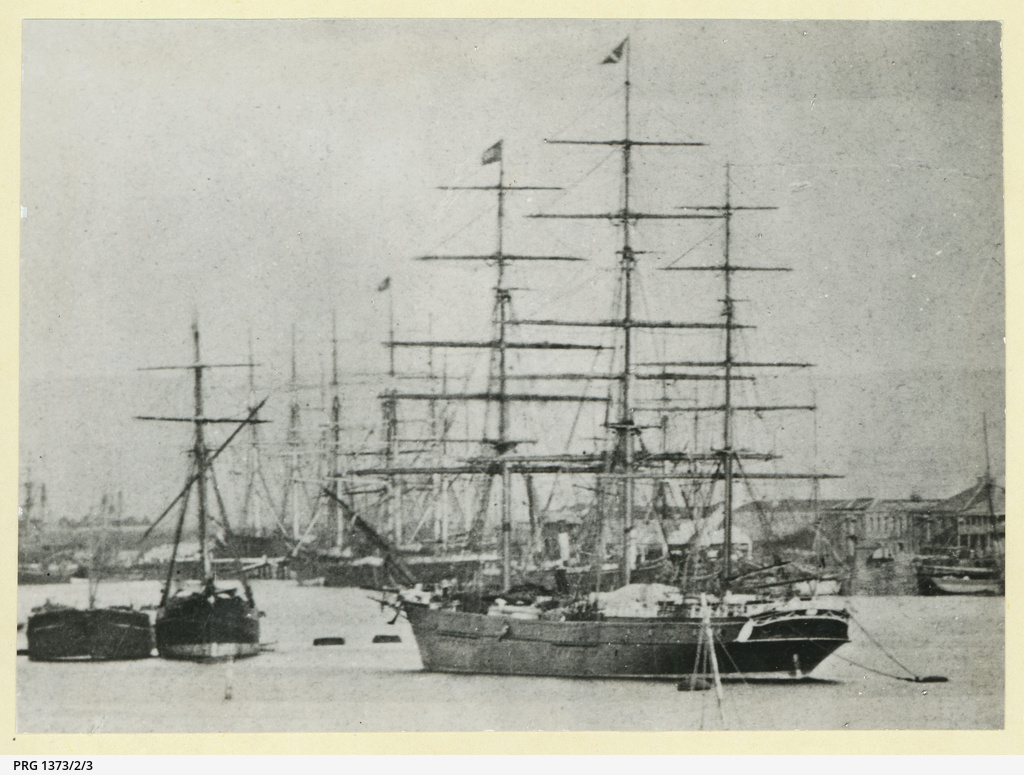
The clipper 'Yatala', 1127 tons, at Port Adelaide circa 1870.

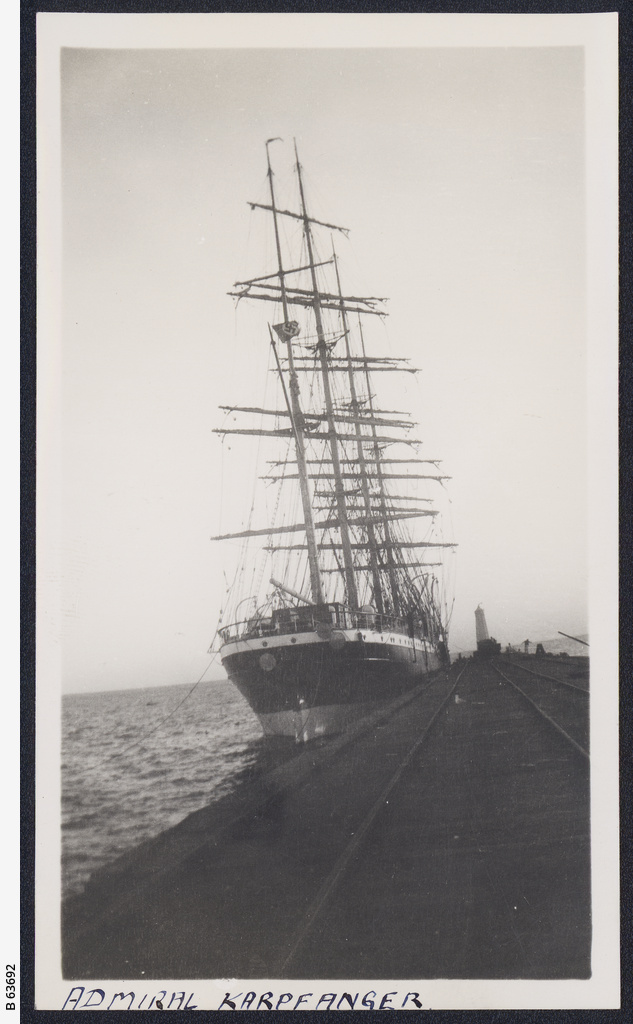
The barque Admiral Karpfanger at Port Germein jetty in South Australia.

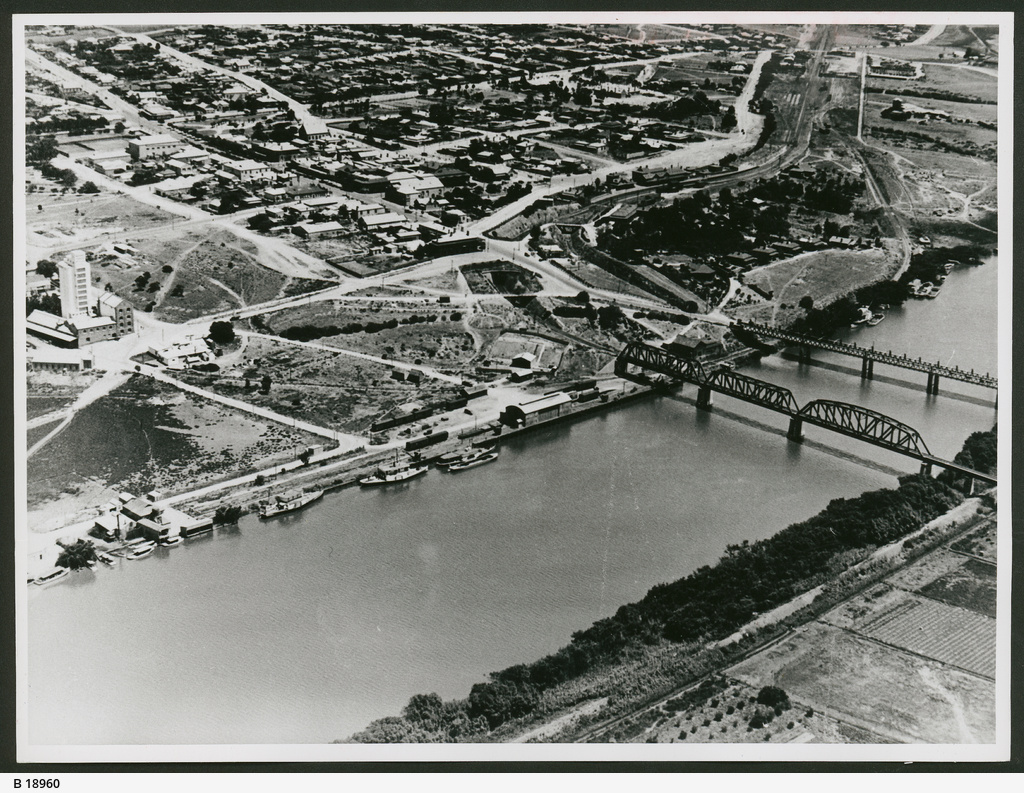
An aerial view of Murray Bridge in 1953 showing rail and road bridges, and also paddle steamers.

== Road ==
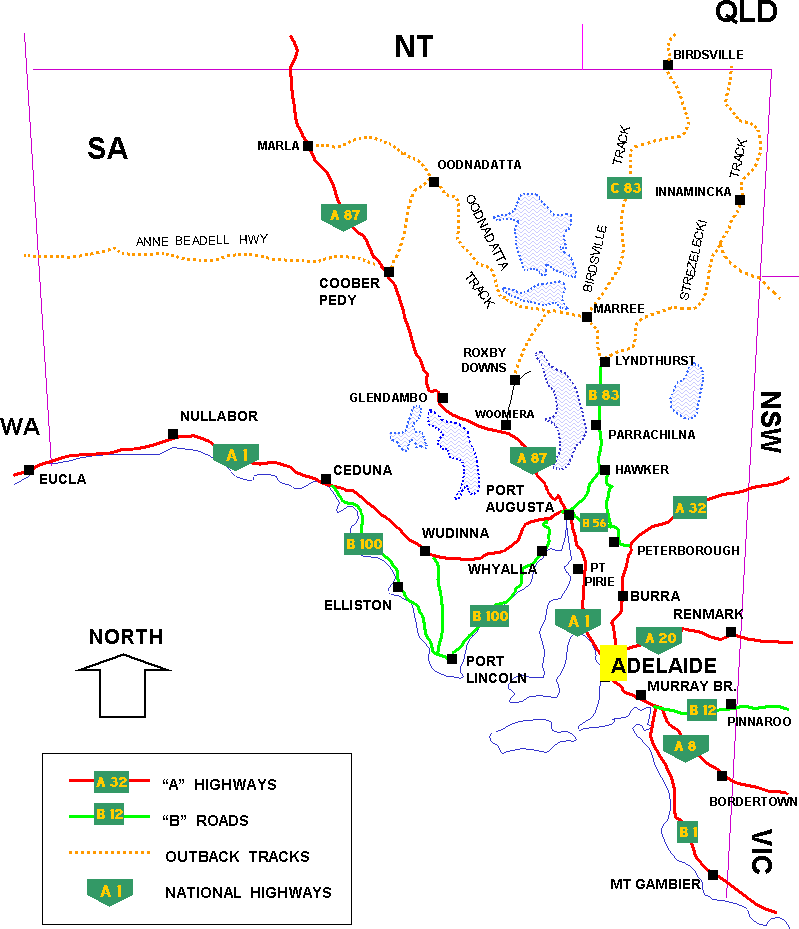
Road transport in South Australia

South Australia has a well developed road network with major highways to Western Australia, the Northern Territory, New South Wales and Victoria.

- Augusta Highway and Princes Highway from Adelaide to Port Augusta
- Eyre Highway from Port Augusta to Perth
- Dukes Highway from Tailem Bend to Melbourne
- Stuart Highway from Port Augusta to Darwin
- Sturt Highway from Gawler to the Riverland
- South Eastern Freeway from Adelaide to Tailem Bend

The state also features an extensive network of roads that provide access to all towns in the state. Road management comes under either the State government for major roads and local government for minor roads. Roads in south Australia are generally of a high standard, although most roads in the north of the state are unpaved tracks that are often impassable after rain.

Adelaide is notable for its lack of freeways in the centre of the city. The central part of the city on the plain between the Adelaide Hills and the coast features a grid of main roads with numerous intersections. In the periphery of the city there are several major freeways including the South Eastern Freeway, the Northern Expressway, Southern Expressway, the Port River Expressway and the North-South Motorway (formerly the South Road Superway).

Cars are the dominant form of commuter transport in South Australia. While public transport usage is relatively small compared to car usage, Adelaide features an extensive public bus network with frequent services. The network includes the 12 km O-Bahn Busway, a guided busway that is among the longest and fastest such routes in the world. Bus services are run under Adelaide Metro which includes the relatively minor rail services. The network covers the entire metropolitan area extending from Gawler in the north, to Sellicks Beach in the south, a distance of over 90 km. The services also extend to Mount Barker, Strathalbyn and several smaller townships in the Adelaide Hills. Many major towns also feature their own public transport bus networks. Country bus services between towns and interstate are provided by private companies such as Stateliner, Firefly Express and Greyhound Australia.

With its extensive road network, trucks play a major role in South Australian transport. Trucks as large as B-Double are a common sight. Large road trains are used in some areas of the state with 53 m Road trains being permitted on the Stuart Highway north of Port Augusta, while smaller road trains and B-Triple are permitted on many roads throughout the state to the north of Adelaide.

== Rail ==
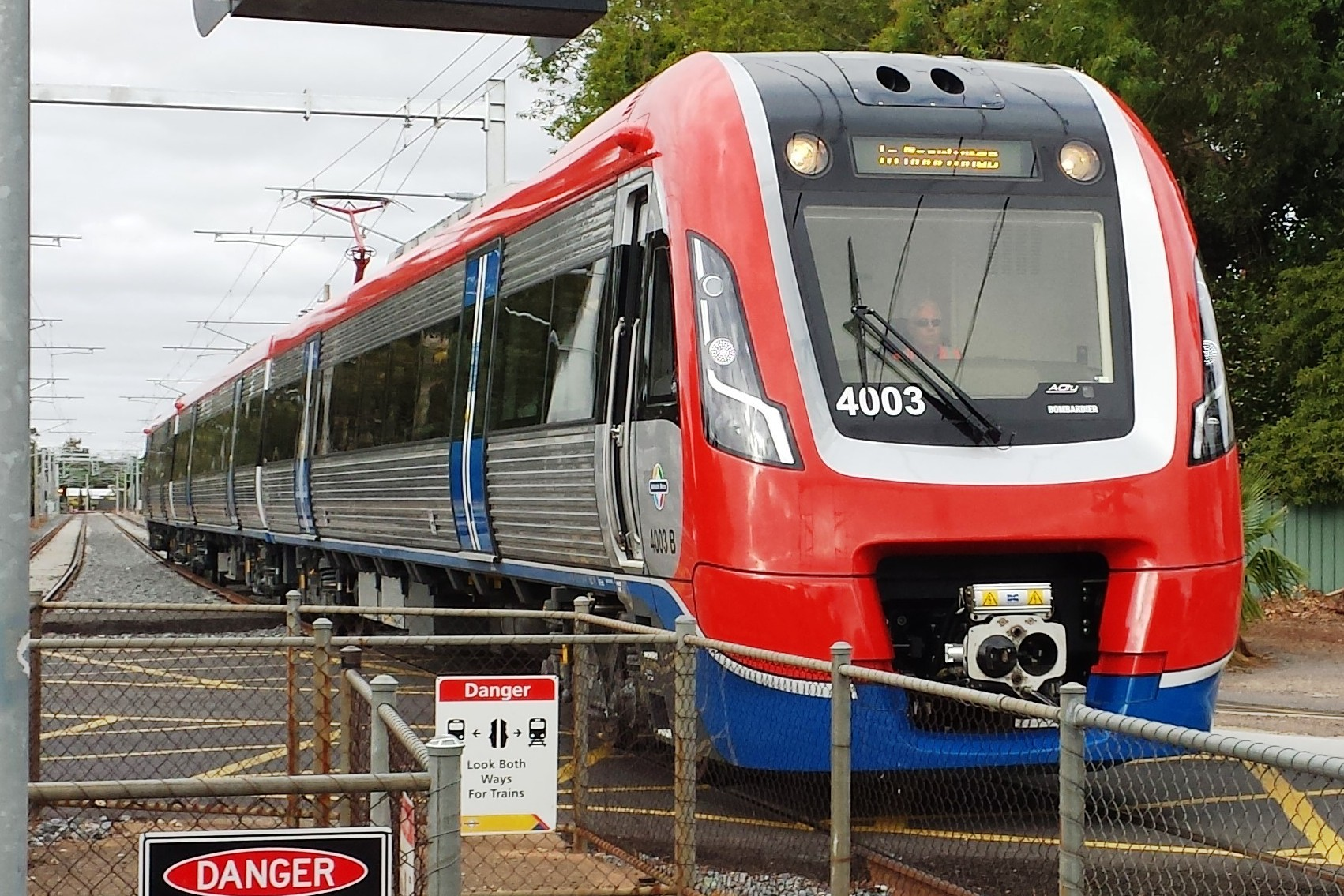
Adelaide Metro 4000 class train used for commuter rail transport in Adelaide

South Australia has standard gauge rail connections to all mainland states with rail connections to Perth, Darwin, Broken Hill and Melbourne. The state's railway network also features several branches, many dedicated to carrying minerals from the states mines. There is also an isolated narrow gauge railway operating on the Eyre Peninsula from Port Lincoln to Ceduna.

Commuter trains run in Adelaide on a broad gauge network of seven lines with 89 stations, totalling 125.9 km. The rail network is in the process of being electrified from the previous diesel railcars, with the Seaford line being the first electrified line to open in February 2014. Adelaide also has a tramlines from Glenelg to the city centre, and from the Botanic Gardens to the entertainment centre. Tramways were largely closed in the 1950s but saw a revival in the 2000s with some upgrades and extensions. Country passenger trains were also a major form of transport in South Australia until the 1980s.

The state has two historical tourist railways. SteamRanger historical railway society operates various steam and other locomotives on the Victor Harbor line between Mount Barker and Victor Harbor. Its services include regular Cockle Train services running between Goolwa and Victor Harbor. The Pichi Richi Railway operates on a 39 km section of the old narrow gauge Central Australia Railway between Port Augusta and Quorn.

== Air ==
South Australia has one major airport located in Adelaide. Adelaide Airport offers multiple daily flights to the other mainland capitals and with Jetstar, Qantas, Tiger Airways and Virgin Australia. There are frequent services to major towns such as Port Lincoln, Whyalla, Kingscote, and Mount Gambier. Services also operate frequently to mining towns such as Roxby Downs and Olympic Dam carrying large numbers of fly-in fly-out workers.

The airport also offers daily international flights to major Asian hubs such as Singapore, Guangzhou, Dubai, Doha, Kuala Lumpur–International and Denpasar. Auckland and Nadi are also serviced by daily flights from Adelaide Airport.

Air freight is limited in South Australia, with only a small number of major regular freight services. Some minor intrastate air freight services are provided by smaller jets and turboprop aircraft, especially to outlying areas of the state.

== Sea ==
South Australia has a major port at Port Adelaide, with numerous minor ports located along its coastline for handling materials such as grain and minerals.

- Port Adelaide is the state's major sea port with a container terminal and passenger terminal located at Outer Harbor and several dock facilities in the inner harbour.
- Port Bonython is a panamax sized facility that handles petroleum products. Ore facilities have been proposed at this facility.
- Port Giles is a panamax sized port facility for handling grains. It is south Australia's youngest port, being established in 1970.
- Port Lincoln is an important port for South Australia's tuna fishing industry and also handles bulk commodities such as grain and minerals.
- Thevenard near Ceduna handles gypsum, grains, salt and mineral sands.
- Wallaroo handles grains and fertilisers.
- Whyalla has a panamax plus port and handles grain and minerals.

The state has one major ferry service operating to Kangaroo Island between Cape Jervis and Penneshaw. This service is operated by Kangaroo Island SeaLink with two ferries: Sealion 2000 and the Spirit of Kangaroo Island. The majority of Kangaroo Island's trade flows along this route.

== See also ==
- History of rail transport in Australia
