= MV Queenscliff =

Two Australian ferries have the name MV Queenscliff:

- MV Queenscliff (1983), a Freshwater-class ferry operating in Sydney
- MV Queenscliff (1992), a modern roll-on/roll-off ferry operating in Victoria
