= Searoad Ferries =

Ferry company of Australia

- Industry: Passenger ferries
- Founded: 1983
- Headquarters: Queenscliff, Australia
- Area served: Port Phillip Bay
- Services: Passenger transportation Freight transportation
- Website: www.searoad.com.au

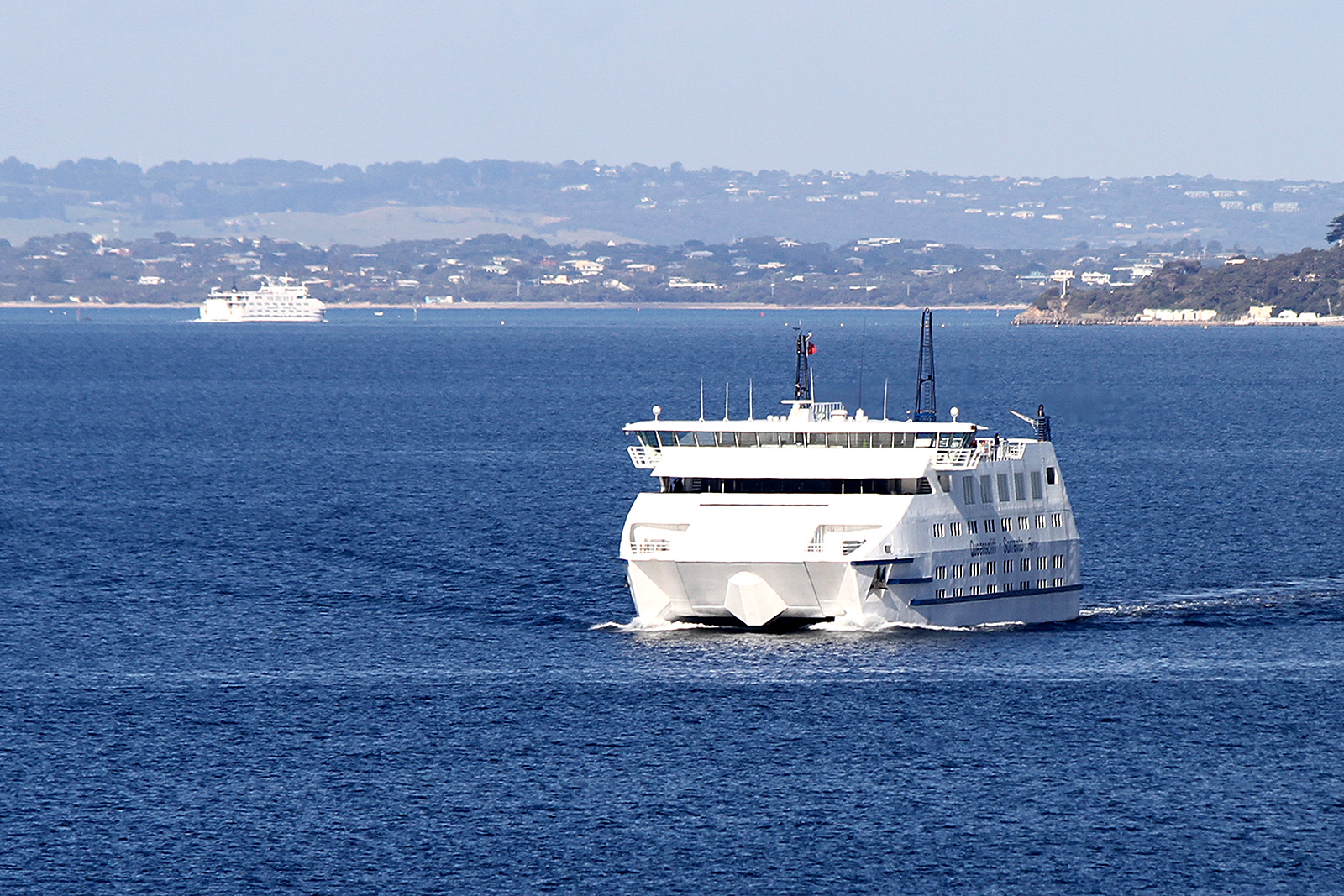
The MV Sorrento heading towards Queenscliff with the MV Queenscliff in the distance heading towards Sorrento, on Port Phillip Bay, Victoria

Searoad Ferries (formerly known as Peninsula Searoad Transport) is an Australian company that operates a roll-on/roll-off vehicle and passenger ferry service between the heads of Port Phillip, near Melbourne, Victoria, Australia.

The route operates between terminals at Queenscliff on the Bellarine Peninsula and Sorrento on the Mornington Peninsula. It is serviced by two ships, currently the MV Queenscliff and the MV Sorrento. Dolphins are often seen following the ferries during their crossing.

The ferry service runs every hour during the day, and makes a crossing in approximately 40 minutes (plus an additional 40 minute check in time for vehicles and 20 minutes for passengers). The alternative drive from Queenscliff to Sorrento via road is approximately three hours during non-peak traffic conditions.

== History ==
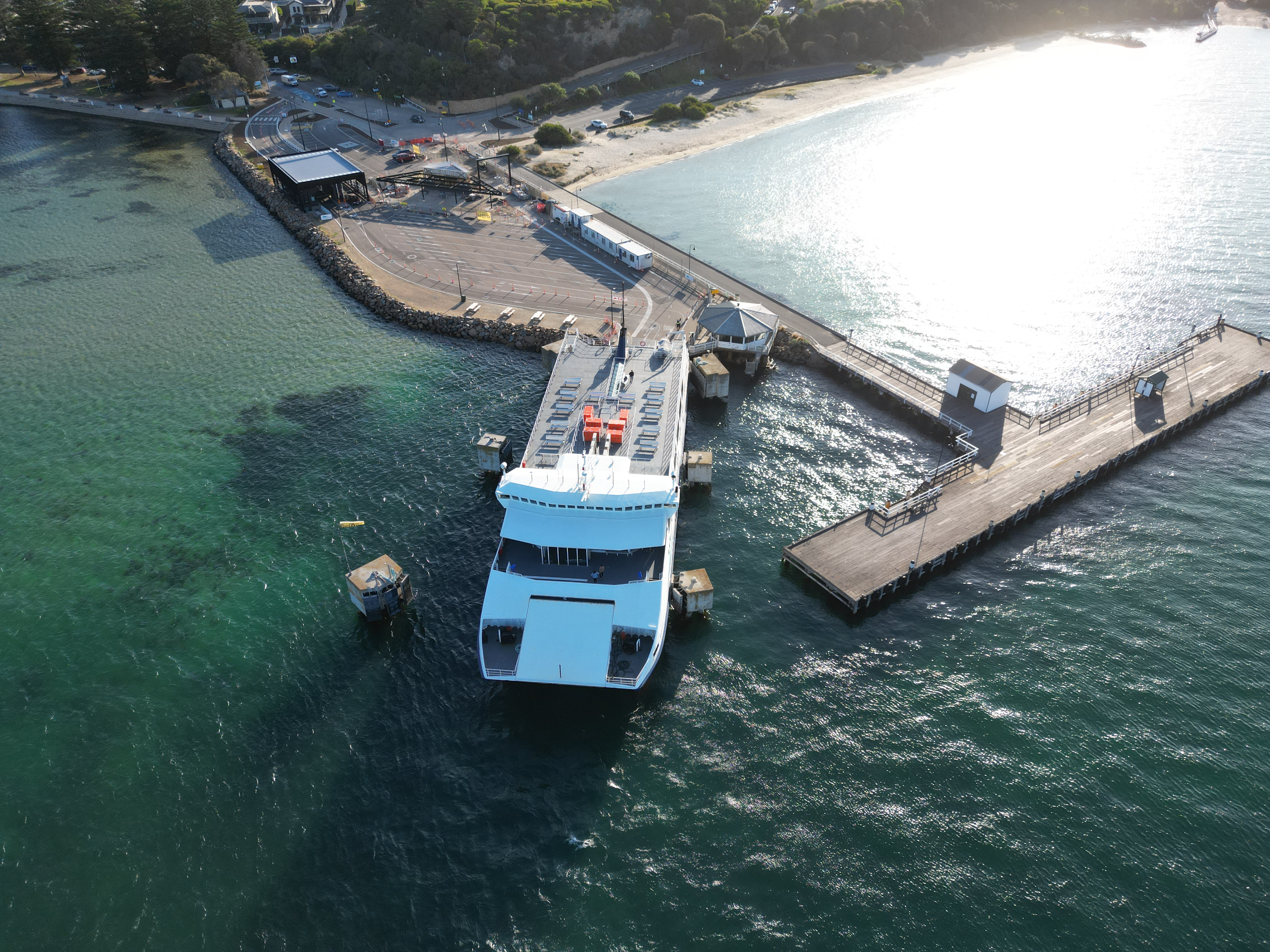
Aerial perspective of a Searoad vessel at Sorrento

Three sea pilots, Paul Ringe, Keith Finnemore and Maurie Cobal founded Peninsula Searoad Transport Pty Ltd (PST) in 1983. They believed that a vehicular ferry should run between Queenscliff and Sorrento. There were mixed opinions about this from the public. Some people thought that the novelty would wear off and then business would fail. However, the various tourism boards in Victoria were excited about the prospect of having a vehicular ferry, linking the two peninsulas and would also create tourism jobs.

=== Peninsula Princess ===
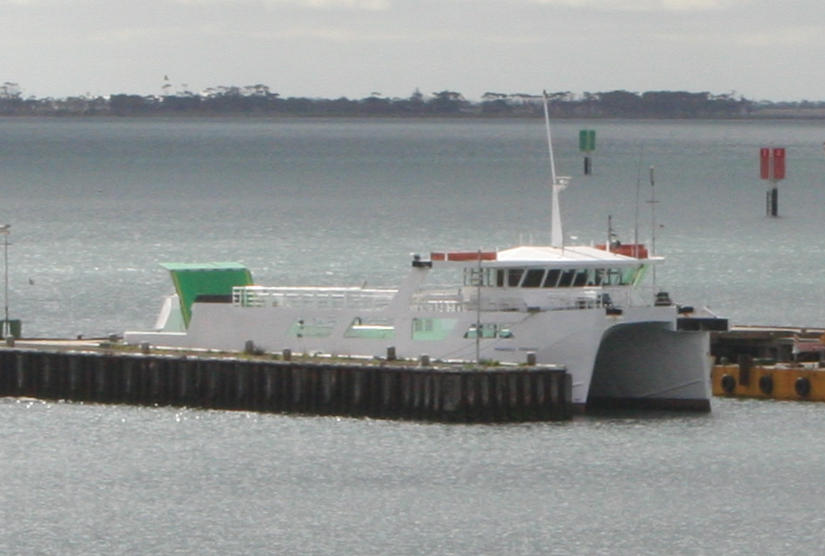
The Peninsula Princess in 2008

After various planning, on 19 June 1987 the Peninsula Princess was launched in Carrington, New South Wales. She underwent sea trials before moving to Port Phillip Bay. Her crew boarded her in Geelong, Victoria to get a feel for the vessel. She had to wait there for the Queenscliff berth to be completed.

The first sailing was intended to be on 7 September 1987, but the berths specially designed for this vessel at Queenscliff and Sorrento were not yet complete.

On 13 September 1987, she entered service. On the first arrival at Sorrento, the skipper encountered a problem with the ahead/astern controls. She hit the concrete wharf and whilst tyres around the wharf buffered the impact there was still considerable damage done to the transom. Commercial operations started on the weekend commencing 19 September 1987.

A few weeks later, during low tide at Queenscliff the crew encountered problems because of the depth of the water and the strong winds. As one of the deckhands attempted to take control by winching the boat in to its berth, the rope slipped and jumped and he was thrown to the deck. By the time he attempted to regain his footing the Peninsula Princess had been taken hold of by the wind. She was thrown against the edge of the creek and broke a propeller and had a bent shaft. The ferry had to be dry docked for repairs. The business had financial issues and could not afford for this to happen again.

After the new ferry was introduced, the Peninsula Princess was frequently docked at the former Queenscliff ferry berth. In 2004 the ferry was sighted docked in the Tamar River in Launceston, Tasmania.

=== MV Queenscliff ===
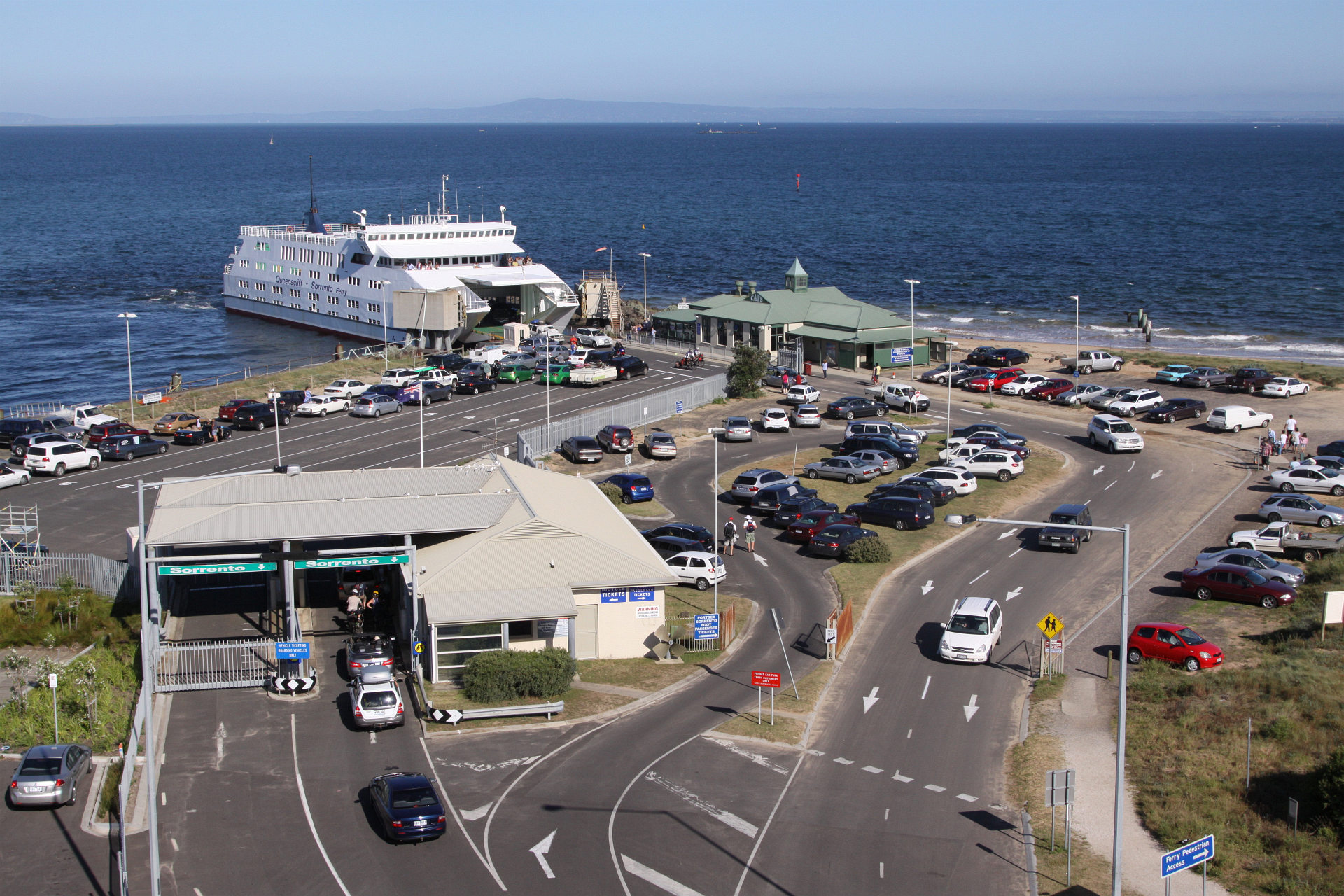
Ferry terminal at Queenscliff, with MV Queenscliff unloading cars

By the early 1990s, traffic using the ferry had increased, and an increase in capacity was required to cope. A new and much larger ferry, the MV Queenscliff was purchased, and work commenced on the ferry berths to enable them to handle the new ferry. At Sorrento the existing berth was altered, while at Queenscliff a new berth was built to the south.

These works were not without controversy, and Peninsula Searoad Transport was required to attend the Administrative Appeals Tribunal to resolve the issues. The new ferry cost $5 million, and was put into service on 22 December 1993.

On 12 October 2005, the Australian Defence Force staged an anti-terrorism exercise on the MV Queenscliff. Two Black Hawk helicopters were used to fast rope members of the Tactical Assault Group onto the roof of the ferry, and members of the Boat Assault Force boarded the ferry from inflatable dinghies.

=== MV Sorrento ===
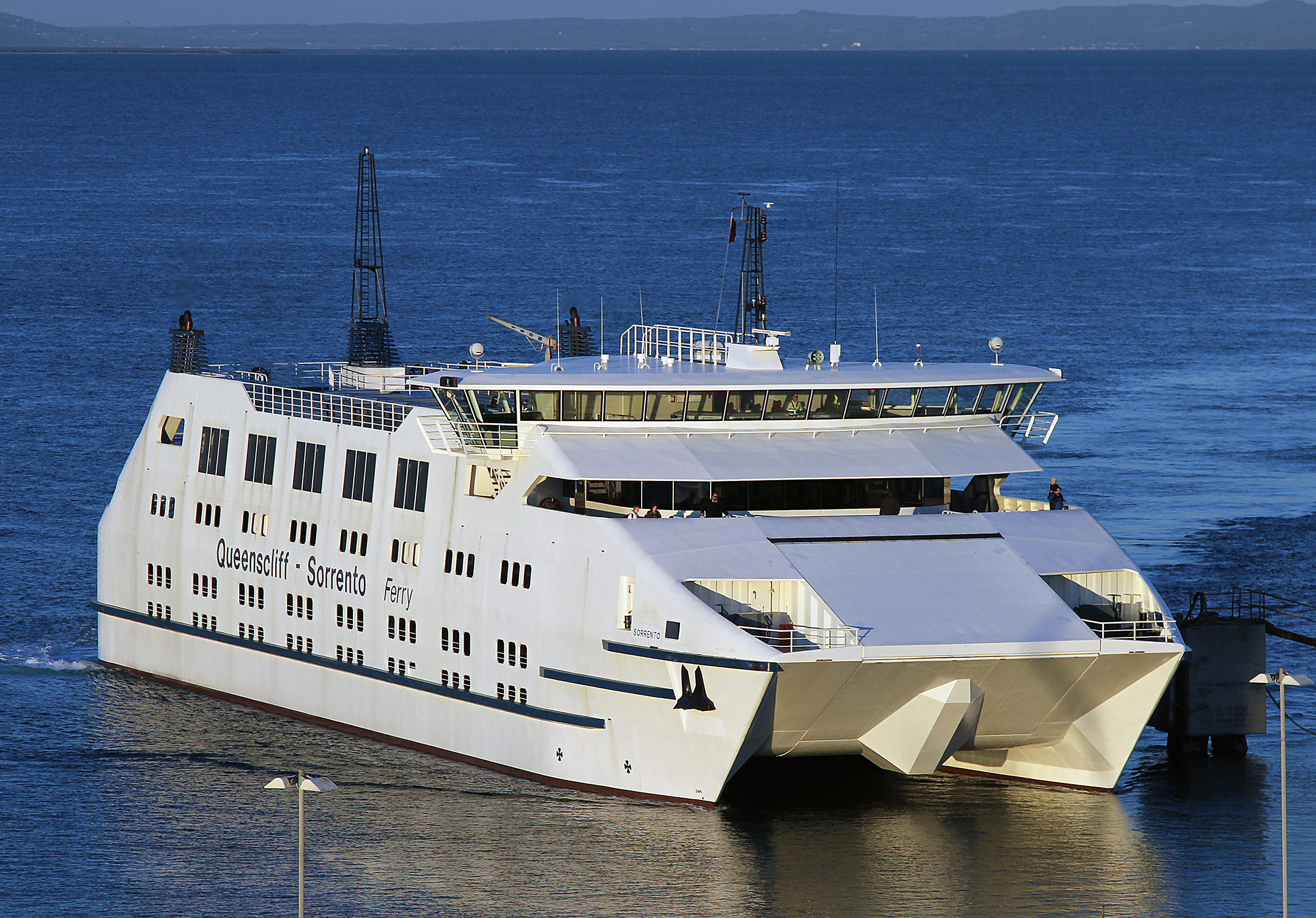
MV Sorrento docking at Queenscliff

Traffic using the ferry service continued to grow though the 1990s, carrying about 110,000 cars/trucks/coaches/motorcycles and 600,000 passengers each year. As a result, in 2000 it was decided to purchase a second ferry, enabling a doubling in the service frequency.

The MV Sorrento was built in Launceston, Tasmania, Australia at a cost of $12 million, and was similar in size and appearance to the existing ferry. Minor differences between the two include an elevator from the car deck to the top deck, a new lounge at the front called the 'Portsea Lounge', and the number of exterior windows at the top would be in groups of three, not in fours.

The increased frequency resulted in the closure of the Queenscliff - Portsea - Sorrento passenger ferry service in the early 2000s.

== See also ==
- List of Australian ferries
- Port Phillip Bay Bridge proposals
