= Peninsula Princess =

Peninsula Princess may refer to:

- Peninsula Princess (Australia), a ferry that formerly operated in Victoria, Australia
- Peninsula Princess (Canada), a ferry currently operating in New Brunswick, Canada
