= PS Shamrock =

PS Shamrock is the name of the following ships:

- PS Shamrock (1843), a ferry in Australia 1843–1851
- PS Shamrock (1876), operated by the London and North Western Railway 1876–1898

== See also ==
- Shamrock (disambiguation)
