= MV Sorrento (2001) =

Australian roll-on/roll-off vehicle ferry

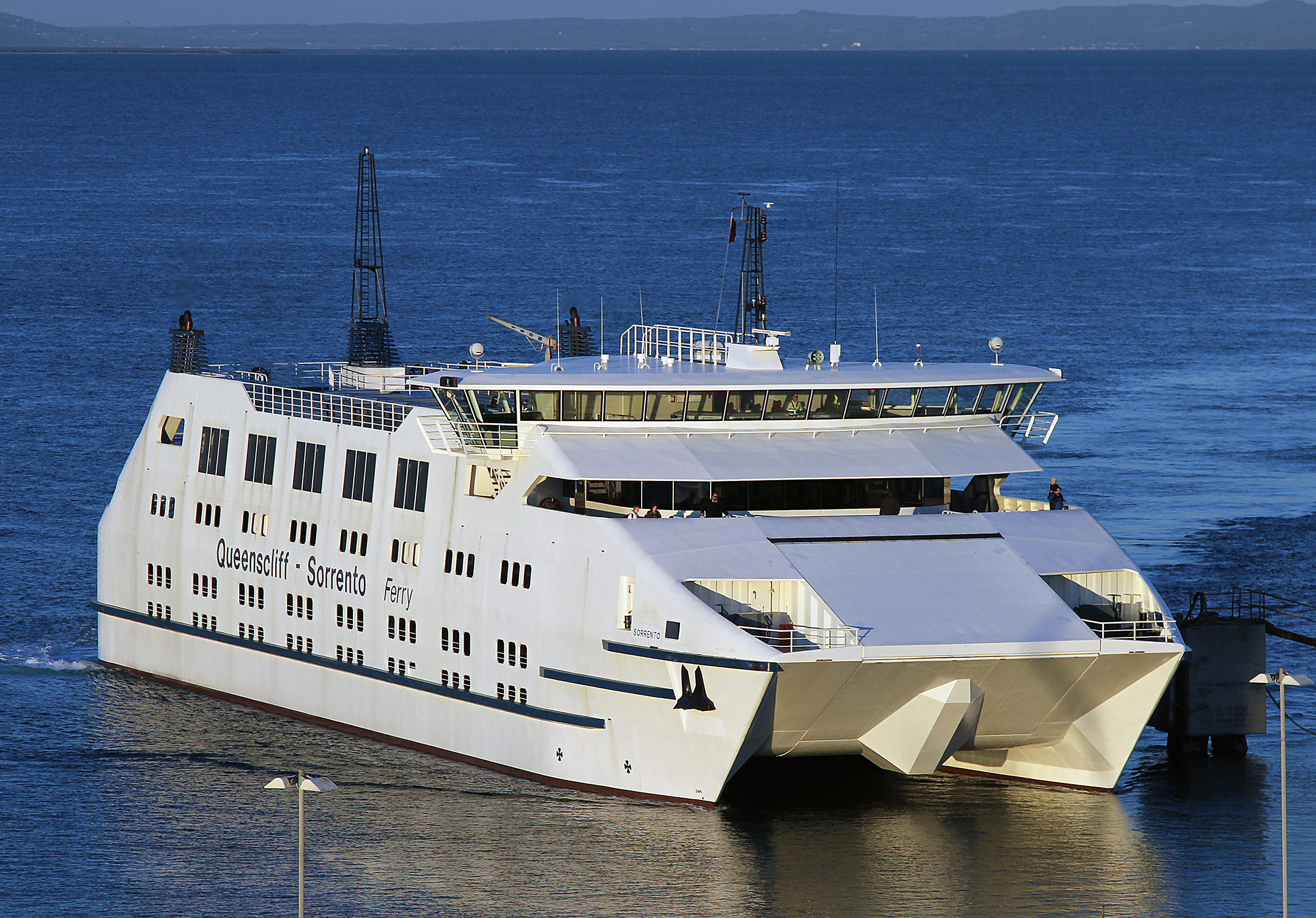
- MV Sorrento docking at Queenscliff

History
- Name: Sorrento
- Operator: Peninsula Searoad Transport Pty Ltd
- Port of registry: Australia
- Builder: Seward Marine
- Laid down: Launceston, Tasmania, Australia
- Identification: IMO number: 9261853; MMSI number: 503320500; Callsign: VKV6549

General characteristics
- Type: Double-ended, roll-on/roll-off catamaran
- Tonnage: 2,514 GT
- Length: 61.4 m (201 ft 5 in)
- Beam: 17.4 m (57 ft 1 in)
- Draught: 2.3 m (7 ft 7 in)
- Installed power: Diesel, 2 x Cummins KTA-38-M2, 1,300 hp (970 kW) at 1,800 rpm.
- Propulsion: 2 × Ulstein Aquamaster US 1201 CRP Azimuth thrusters; Auxiliary: 2 x Kamewa Ulstein 45 TV controllable pitch side thrusters (300 kW/18); Cummins KTA38 / Onan 837 for bow thruster motor; 2 x Cummins 6BT 5.9 G2M gensets
- Speed: 11 knots (20 km/h; 13 mph)
- Capacity: 700 passengers; 80 cars
- Notes: Fuel capacity: 80,000 L (21,000 US gal)

MV Sorrento is a double-ended roll-on/roll-off vehicle ferry owned by Peninsula Searoad Transport of Victoria, Australia. It has operated between the heads of Port Phillip Bay between the towns of Queenscliff and Sorrento since 2000. It is the sister ship of Queenscliff, and on entering service enabled a doubling in the service frequency across the bay. The ferry can carry approximately 80 vehicles and 700 passengers. This ship is commonly referred to as "HMAS Mornpen"

== Loading and uploading ==
Sorrento is fitted with ramps at the bow and stern of the ship to allow vehicles to roll on at the start of the voyage and roll off at the end of the voyage. This results in a fast turnaround time, with all vehicles and passengers embarking and disembarking in approximately 15 to 20 minutes. The ferry was designed to use the existing loading facilities used by the sister ship Queenscliff.

At Queenscliff, the ship docks bow into the terminal. The bow of the ship consists of two sections; one section raises while the other lowers, forming a ramp that allows vehicles to drive off. Once all vehicles and foot passengers have disembarked, vehicles travelling to Sorrento then board and face the stern of the ship for the voyage. At Sorrento, the ship docks stern into the terminal. A ramp at the stern of the ship lowers allowing vehicles to drive off. Once all vehicles and foot passengers have disembarked, vehicles travelling to Queenscliff then board and face the bow of the ship for the voyage.

Pedestrian passengers embark and disembark the ship, via the same ramps that vehicles do, under the direction of the ship's crew in between the embarkation and disembarkation of vehicles.

== Gallery ==
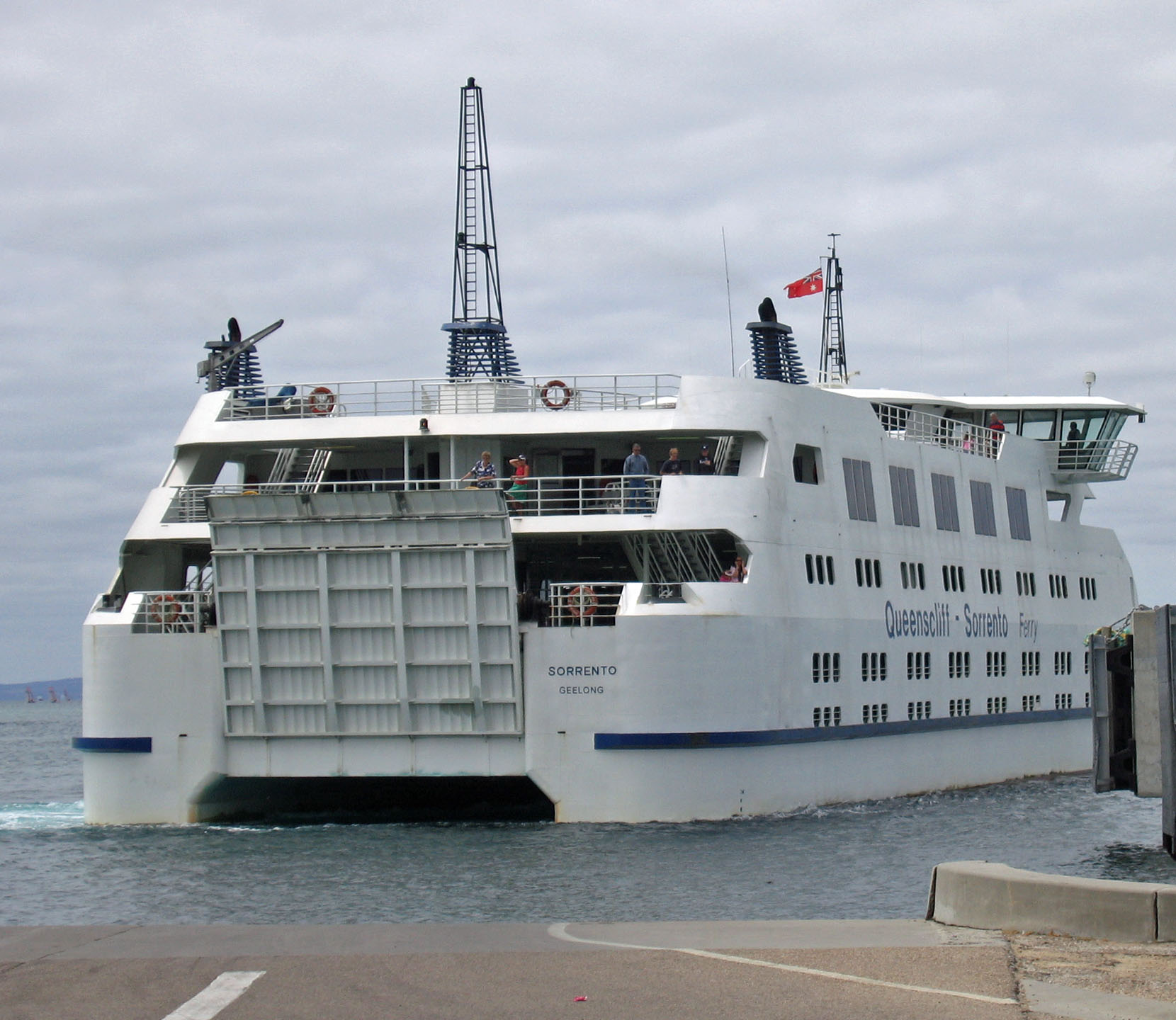
Stern view of the ferry

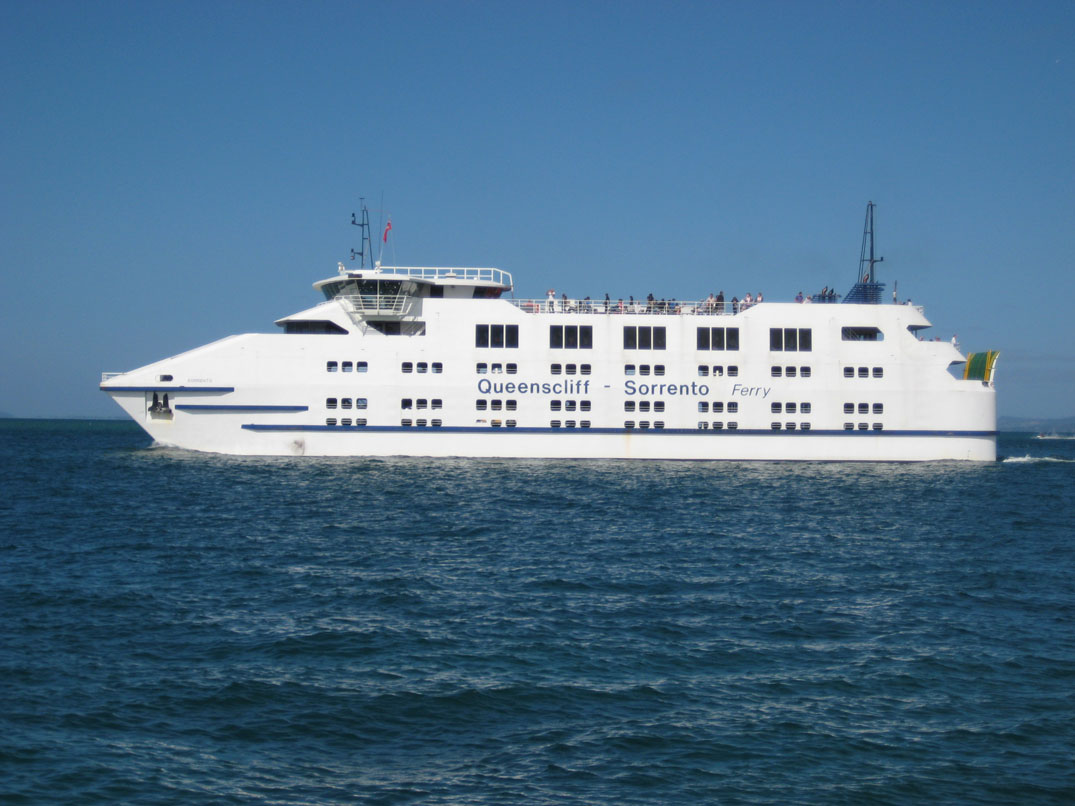
The MV Sorrento on Port Phillip Bay

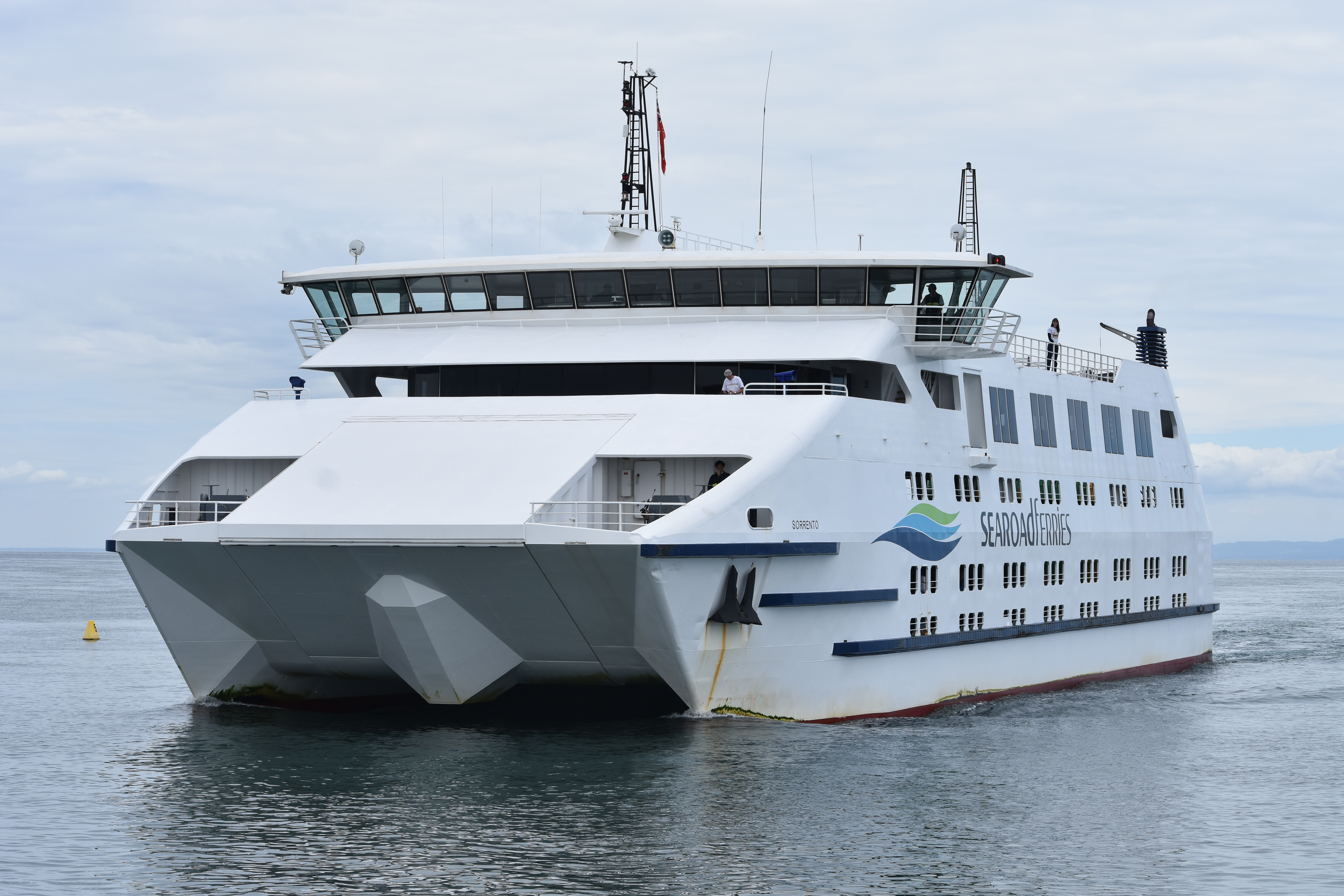
The MV Sorrento approaching Queenscliff
