= Sun (ferry) =

Ferry on the Hawkesbury River

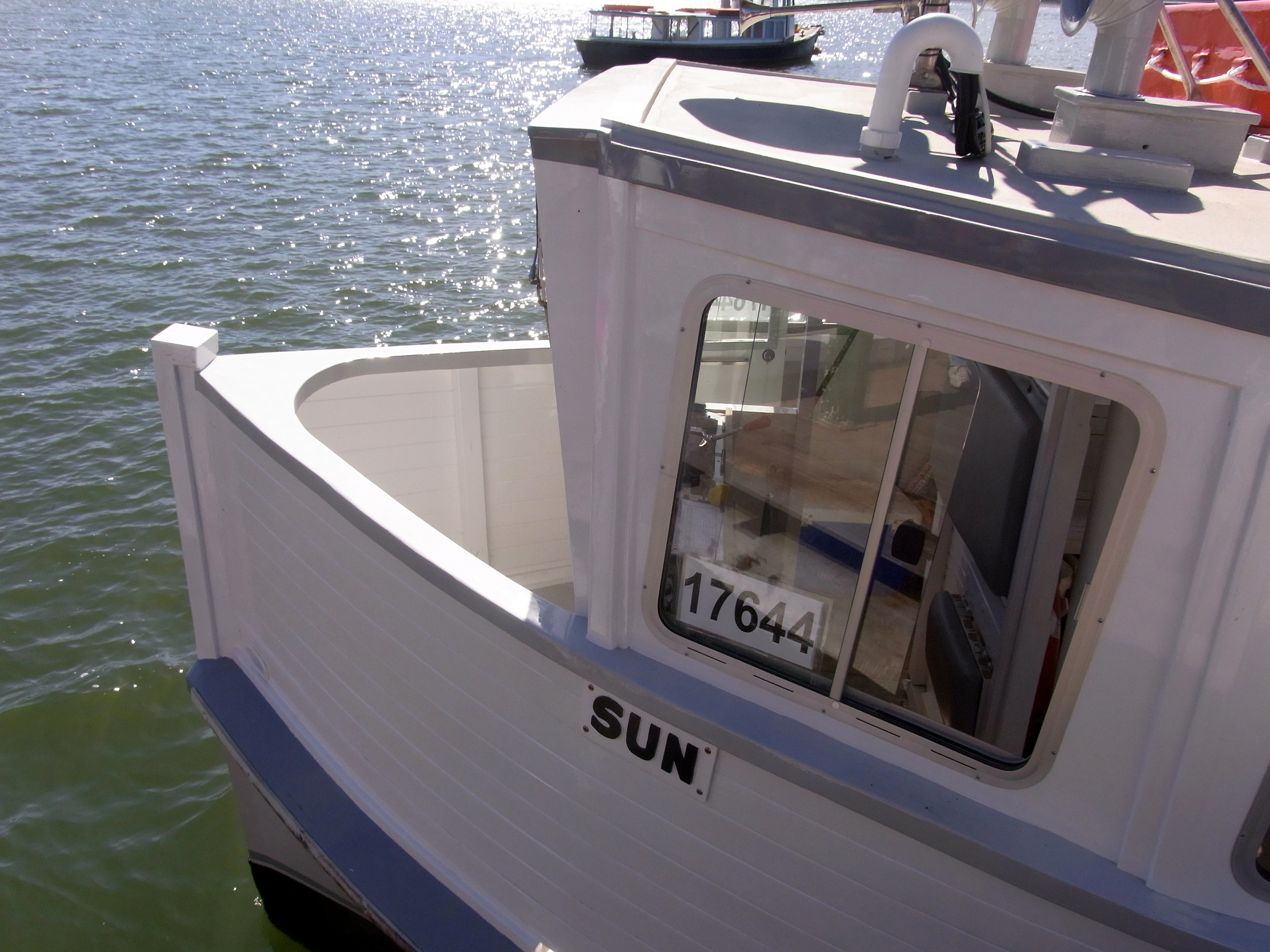
- The prow of the ferry Sun

History
- Operator: Brooklyn Ferry Service
- Builder: Bill Ryan, Oxley Island near Taree, Australia
- Completed: circa 1942
- Identification: 853752 / 17644
- Status: Operational

General characteristics
- Tonnage: 13
- Length: 11.58 m (38 ft 0 in)
- Installed power: Gardner 4LW, 75 hp (56 kW) at 1,700 rpm, Natural 4-cylinder diesel, Cylinder capacity: 5,580 cc
- Capacity: 62
- Crew: 1

Sun is a ferry on the Hawkesbury River in New South Wales, Australia. Originally planned as a cream boat for the dairy farmers on the Manning River, it was built some time during World War II. Based at Brooklyn since 1978, on the Dangar Island / Wobby Beach ferry service, carrying a maximum of 62 passengers. Another craft also known as the Sun was built in 1921 by Allan Kell & Sons at Harrington for the Manning River Dairy Co-op.
