= Sealion 2000 =

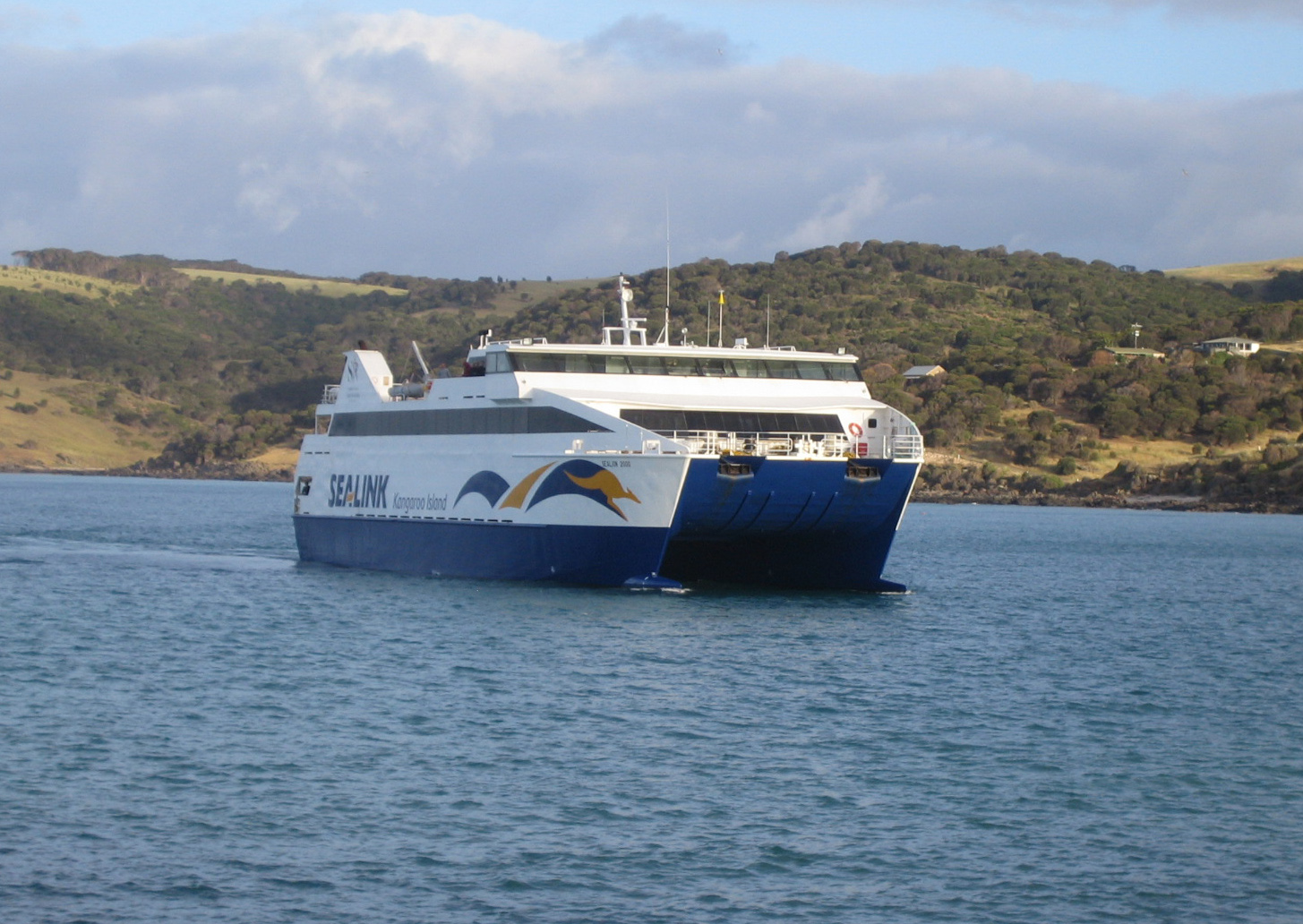
- Sealion 2000 at Penneshaw in November 2007

History

Australia
- Name: Sealion 2000
- Namesake: Sea lion
- Owner: Kangaroo Island SeaLink
- Builder: Tenix, Fremantle
- Launched: September 18, 1998
- Homeport: Port Adelaide
- Identification: IMO number: 9202819; MMSI number: 503608000; Callsign: VM2214

General characteristics
- Type: Catamaran
- Length: 48.8 m
- Beam: 16 m
- Ramps: 1 rear ramp
- Installed power: 2 x 1007 kW Cummins K-38 V12.
- Speed: 16 knots
- Capacity: 378 passengers and 55 cars

Sealion 2000 is a vehicular ferry operated by Kangaroo Island SeaLink on the 18 kilometre Cape Jervis to Penneshaw route across Backstairs Passage along with the Spirit of Kangaroo Island. These two ferries provide the main form of transport to Kangaroo Island operating up to 10 trips daily. This vessel is specifically made for passengers and cars and is a larger boat. Unlike the Spirit of Kangaroo Island which is a freight boat, used for transporting trucks as well as passengers.

It was built in 1998 by Tenix, Fremantle. In 2013 it returned to Fremantle for an overhaul that included its engines being replaced.
