= Spirit of Kangaroo Island =

History

Australia
- Name: Spirit of Kangaroo Island
- Namesake: Kangaroo Island
- Owner: Kangaroo Island SeaLink
- Builder: Austal, Henderson, Western Australia
- Yard number: 117
- Launched: 2003
- Home port: Port Adelaide
- Identification: IMO number: 9289893; MMSI number: 503466000; Callsign: VHS6181
- Nickname(s): SPOKI

General characteristics
- Type: Catamaran ferry
- Length: 50.6 m (166 ft 0 in)
- Beam: 17.8 m (58 ft 5 in)
- Draught: 2.5 m (8 ft 2 in)
- Ramps: 1 rear ramp
- Installed power: 2 × Caterpillar 3512 (1,119 kW)
- Propulsion: 2 × electric bow thrusters
- Speed: 17.8 knots (33.0 km/h; 20.5 mph)
- Capacity: 243 passengers and 53 cars
- Crew: 6

Spirit of Kangaroo Island is a vehicular ferry operated by Kangaroo Island SeaLink on the 18-kilometre (11 mi) Cape Jervis to Penneshaw route across Backstairs Passage along with the Sealion 2000. These two ferries provide the main form of transport to Kangaroo Island operating up to ten trips daily.

She was built in 2003 by Austal, Henderson, Western Australia.
