= Kangaroo Island SeaLink =

South Australian ferry company and tour operator

- Founded: 1989
- Area served: Backstairs Passage
- Revenue: $54.1 million (June 2015)
- Parent: Kelsian Group
- Website: www.sealink.com.au

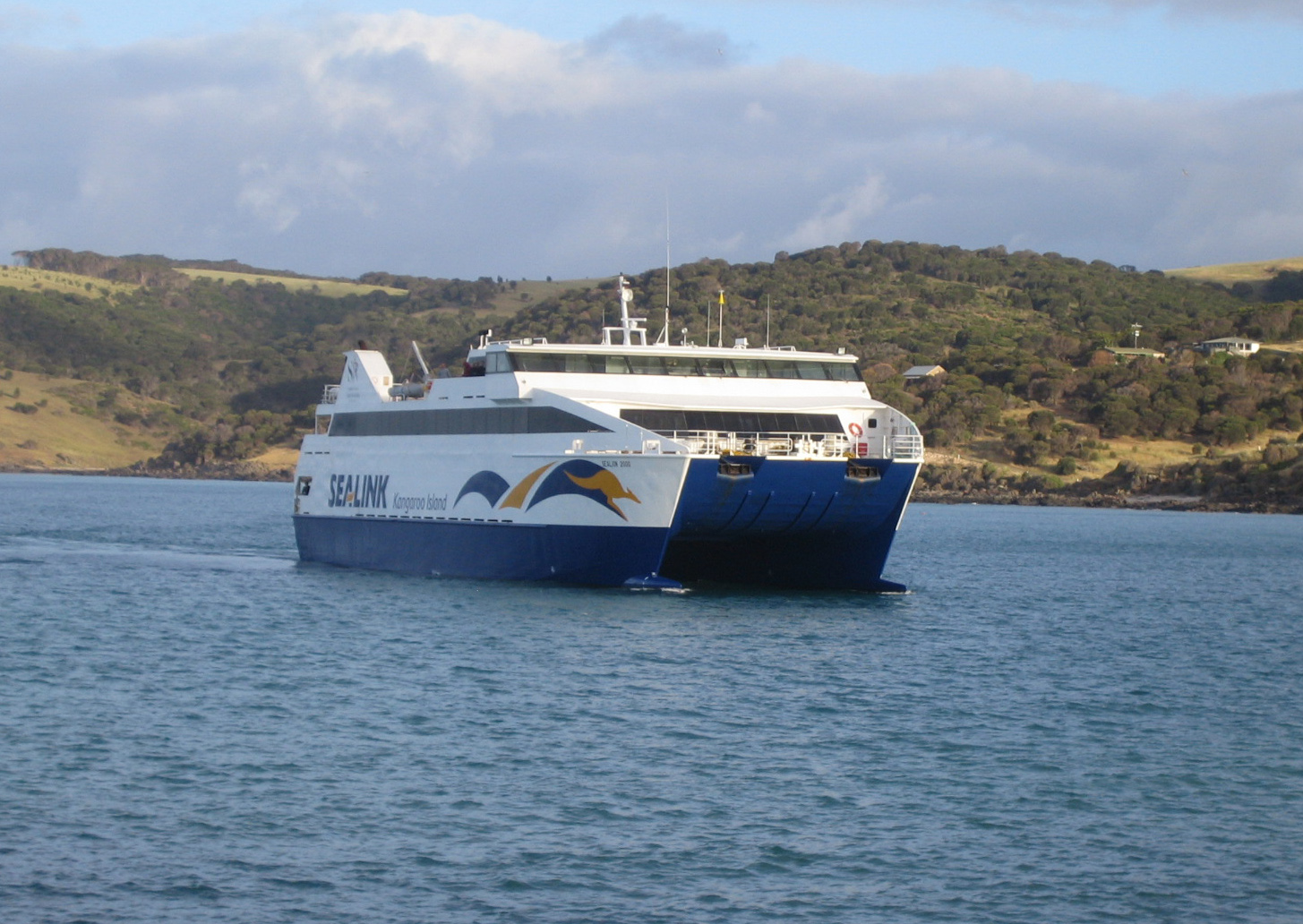
Sealion 2000 arriving at Penneshaw in November 2007

Kangaroo Island SeaLink is a South Australian ferry company and tour operator owned by Kelsian Group, which has plied the crossing from mainland South Australia to Kangaroo Island since 1989. From 1989 to 1994, Kangaroo Island Sealink was owned by the Malaysian company MBF. In 1994 the company was sold to a consortium of staff members and Kangaroo Island residents. SeaLink's two currently operating ferries, Sealion 2000 and Spirit of Kangaroo Island, cross Backstairs Passage from Cape Jervis to Penneshaw in about 45 minutes, up to 10 times daily.

SeaLink had acquired the previous ferry service founded by Peter March. Its first vessel was Philanderer 3, the first of March's vessels to carry vehicles. In later years, the company operated the Island Navigator (purchased 1990), also a car carrying ferry, as the designated freight and fuel carrier.

SeaLink has outlasted several competing companies since it began operations. Boat Torque, a Western Australian company, operated Superflyte from 1994 until 1997, whilst Kangaroo Island Ferries had a short-lived venture with SeaWay, from September 2004 until February 2005. Under different ownership, SeaWay recommenced services in August 2007, before its operations were suspended in May 2008 and an administrator appointed shortly thereafter.

SeaLink holds a virtual monopoly on oversea transport, primarily due to its long-term lease of the Cape Jervis berth. In 2021 Sealink announced they had been awarded a contract for the operation of the Kangaroo Island ferry service for the next 25 years, starting at the expiration of their former contract in 2024. Kangaroo Island residents have expressed displeasure with the exclusive arrangement granted to SeaLink.

SeaLink had state government subsidies with respect to its freight charges, which ended in 2003.

== New vessels ==
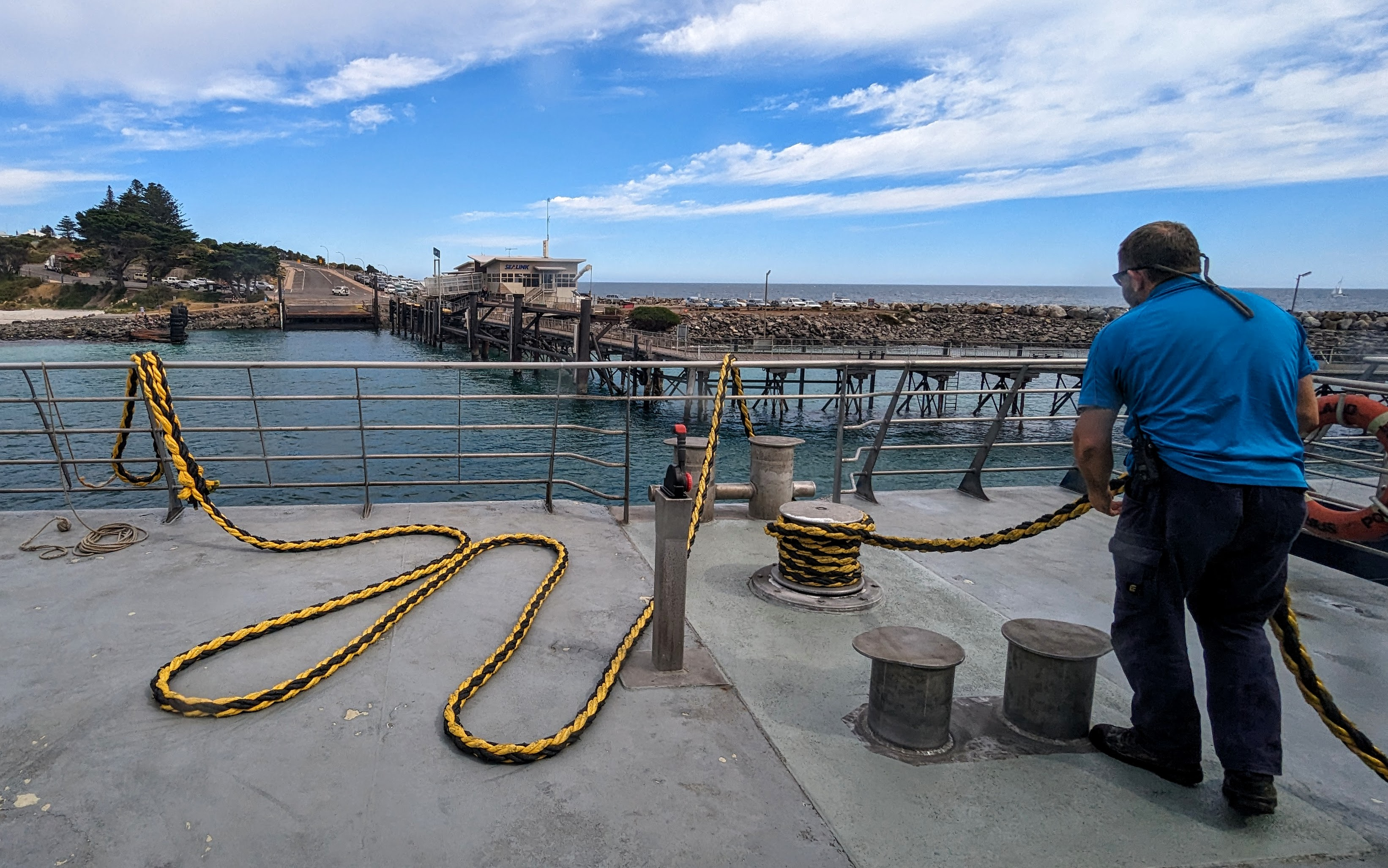
Arriving at Penneshaw, Kangaroo Island, on the SeaLink ferry

As part of the new contract in 2021, Sealink has announced the release of two new vessels to replace the aging Sealion 2000 and Spirit of Kangaroo Island These two new vessels will be identical in construction. The design has been contracted to Sea Transport Solutions. They will be roll-on roll-off vessels, equipped with ramps fore and aft. They will be 60 metres in length, an advance of 10 metres on the current vessels, and have a beam of 20 metres.
