= MV Queenscliff (1992) =

Double ended roll-on/roll-off vehicle ferry

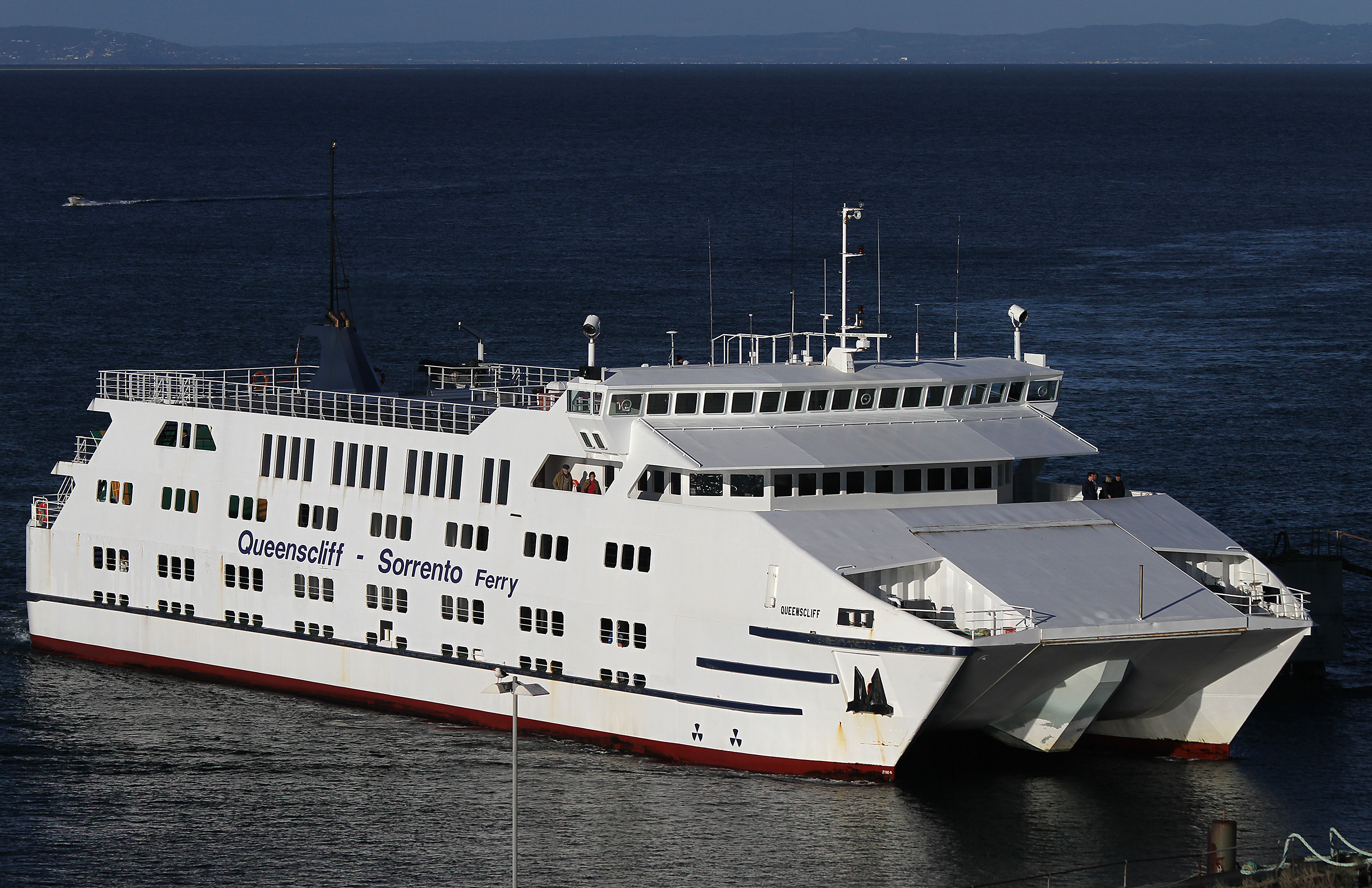
- MV Queenscliff docking at Queenscliff

History
- Name: MV Queenscliff
- Operator: Peninsula Searoad Transport Pty Ltd
- Port of registry: Australia
- Route: Queenscliff and Sorrento, Victoria, Australia
- Completed: 1992
- Maiden voyage: 22 December 1993
- Identification: IMO number: 9074171; MMSI Number: 503320400; Callsign: VHS2977

General characteristics
- Class & type: Double-ended, roll-on/roll-off catamaran
- Tonnage: 3,200 GT (approx)
- Length: 60.1 m (197 ft 2 in)
- Beam: 16.4 m (53 ft 10 in)
- Draft: 2.3 m (7 ft 7 in)
- Installed power: Diesel
- Propulsion: 2 x 800 kW
- Speed: 11 knots (20 km/h)
- Capacity: 700 passengers; 80 cars

MV Queenscliff is a double ended roll-on/roll-off vehicle ferry owned by Peninsula Searoad Transport of Victoria, Australia. It has operated between the heads of Port Phillip Bay between the towns of Queenscliff and Sorrento since December 1993. The ferry replaced the earlier Peninsula Princess used on the route, and can carry approximately 80 vehicles and 700 passengers. During the 2011 off season the ferry underwent a $2 Million refit.

== Loading and unloading ==
The MV Queenscliff is fitted with ramps at the bow and stern of the ship to allow vehicles to roll on at the start of the voyage and roll off at the end of the voyage. This results in a fast turnaround time, with all vehicles and passengers embarking and disembarking in approximately 15 to 20 minutes. The loading facilities are also used by the MV Sorrento, the earlier Peninsula Princess used a different ramp at Queenscliff.

At Queenscliff, the ship docks bow into the terminal. The bow of the ship consists of two sections; one section raises whilst the other lowers forming a ramp that allows vehicles to drive off. Once all vehicles and foot passengers have disembarked the ship, vehicles travelling to Sorrento then board and face the stern of the ship for the voyage. At Sorrento, the ship docks stern into the terminal. A ramp at the stern of the ship lowers allowing vehicles to drive off. Once all vehicles and foot passengers have disembarked, vehicles travelling to Queenscliff then board and face the bow of the ship for the voyage.

Foot passengers embark and disembark the ship, via the same ramps that vehicles do, under the direction of the ship's crew in between the embarkation and disembarkation of vehicles.

== Gallery ==
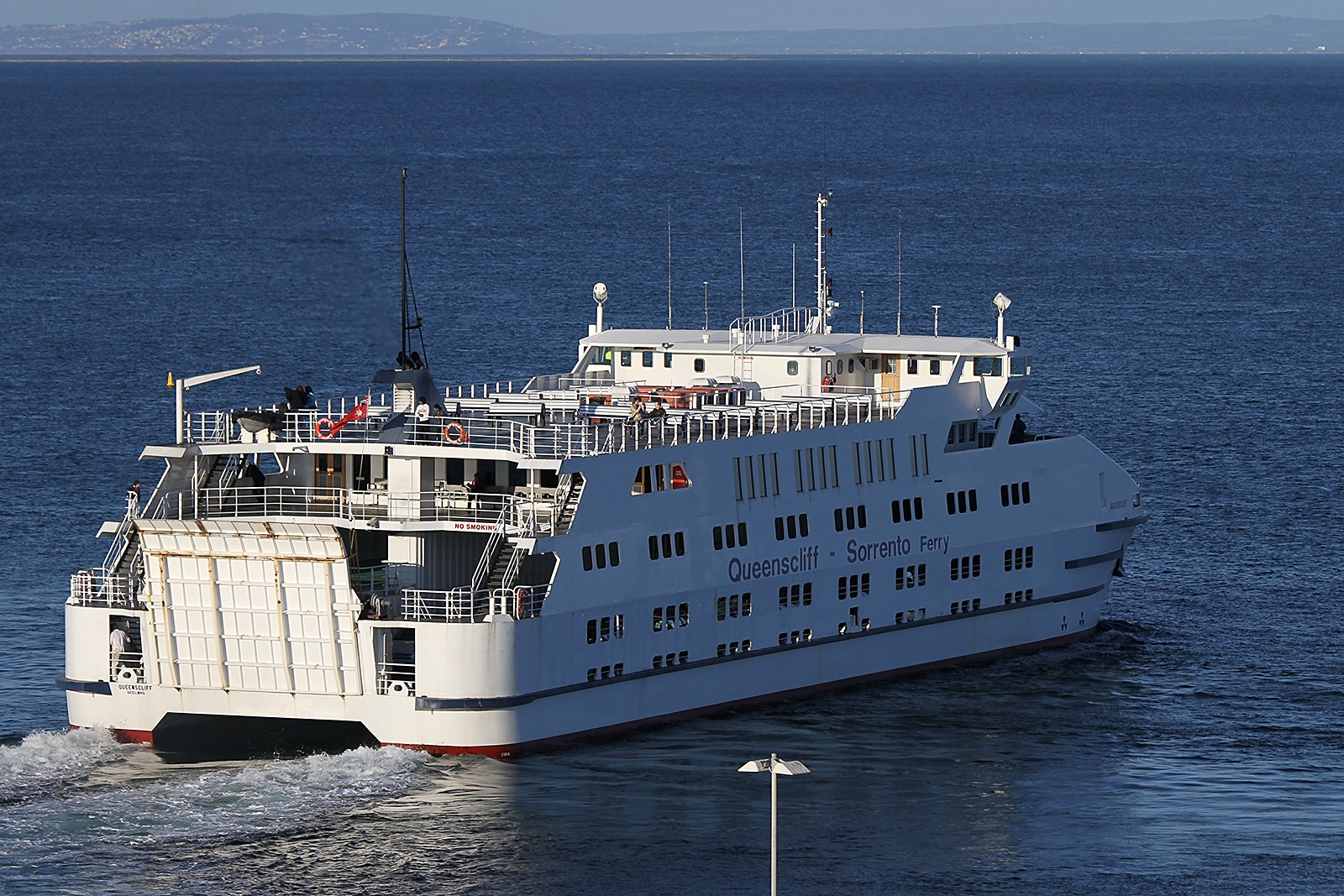
Rear view of the ferry

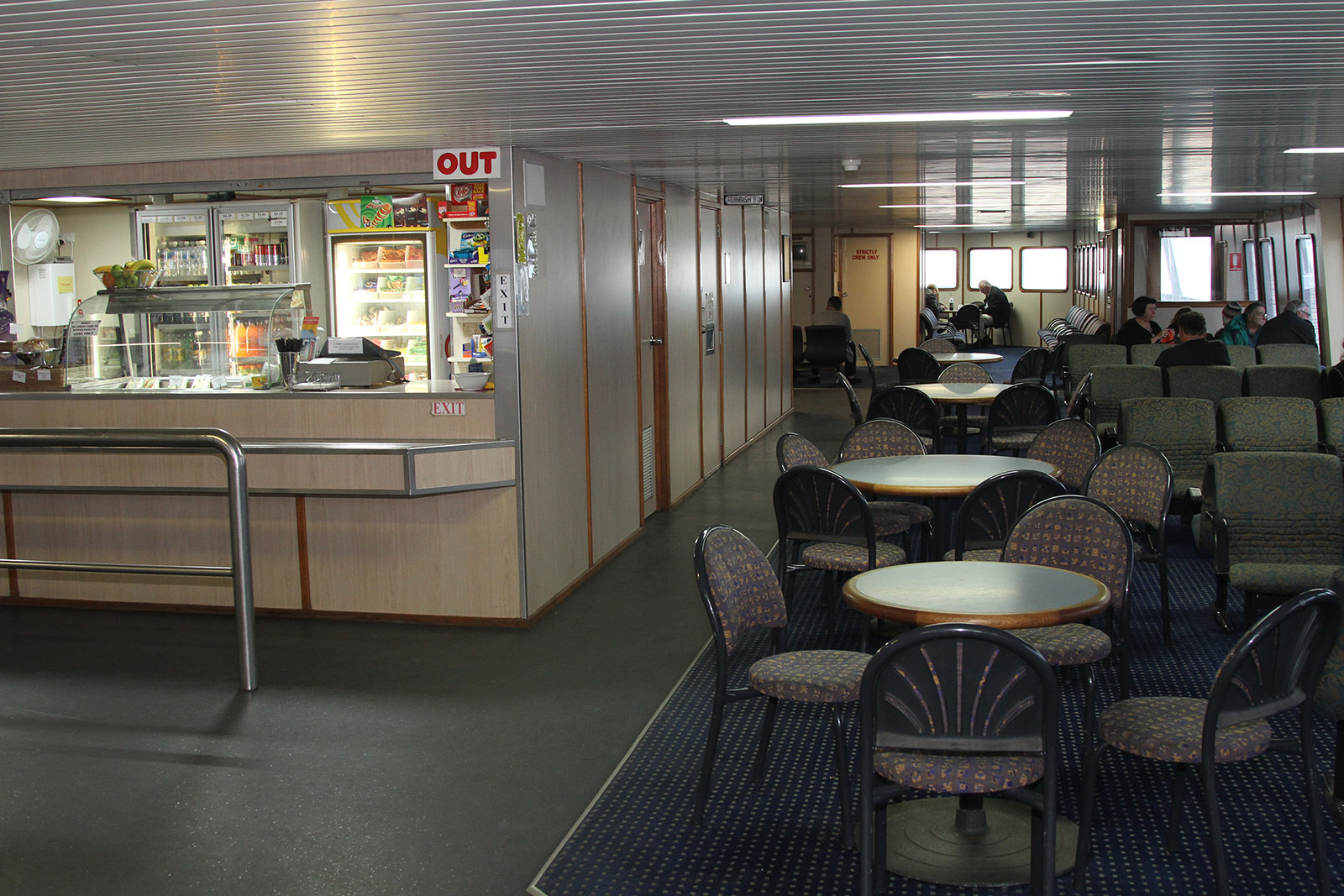
Pre refit interior view of the ferry

== See also ==
- MV Sorrento
