= Peninsula Princess (Australia) =

Ship built in 1987

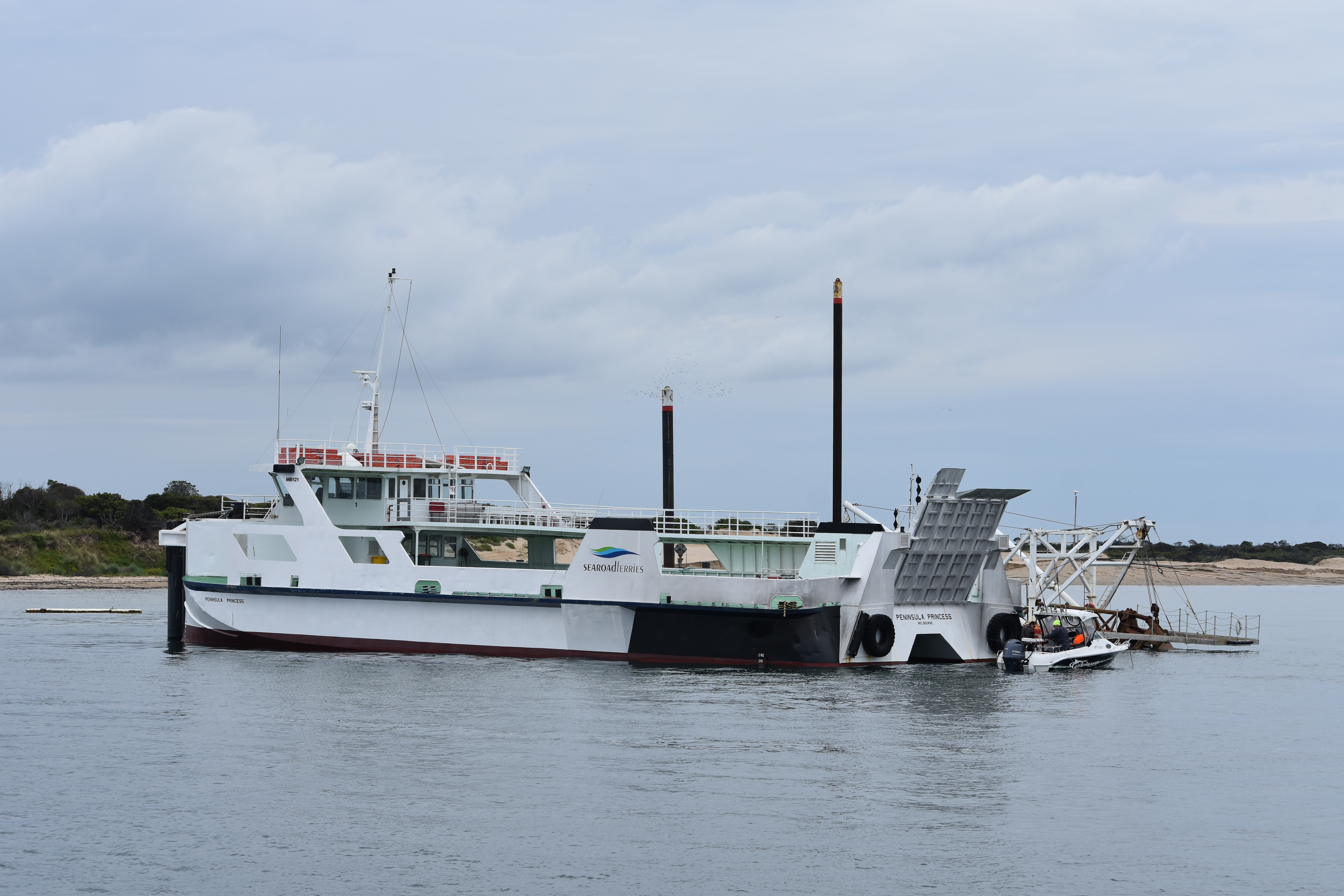
- Peninsula Princess in 2025

History
- Name: Peninsula Princess
- Operator: Peninsula Searoad Transport Pty Ltd
- Port of registry: Australia
- Builder: Stuart Ballantyne, ASD Marine Construction
- Laid down: Carrington Slipways, New South Wales, Australia
- Completed: 1987
- Identification: IMO number: 8614481
- Status: In service

General characteristics
- Type: Single-ended, roll-on/roll-off ferry
- Tonnage: 197 GT
- Length: 35.6 m (116 ft 10 in)
- Beam: 13.4 m (44 ft 0 in)
- Draft: 2.3 m (7 ft 7 in)
- Ramps: Bow: 4.00 m × 4.75 m (13.12 ft × 15.58 ft); Stern: 5.50 m × 4.50 m (18.0 ft × 14.8 ft)
- Installed power: 2 × 410 shp (310 kW) Deutz 8-cylinder diesels S-BASM 816 'U'; 2 × 20 KVA MVM 240 V single phase auxiliary
- Propulsion: Gearbox: Reintjes WAF 340 3.5:1
- Speed: 12.5 knots (23.2 km/h; 14.4 mph) maximum
- Capacity: 300 passengers; 36 cars; Axle load: Stern ramp 10 tonnes, main deck 10 tonnes; Point load: 5 tonnes
- Crew: Four in summer, three in winter
- Notes: Fuel consumption: 105 L (28 US gal) / hour; Fuel capacity: 41,000 L (11,000 US gal)

Peninsula Princess is a single ended roll-on/roll-off vehicle ferry owned by Peninsula Searoad Transport of Victoria, Australia. It operated between the heads of Port Phillip Bay between the towns of Queenscliff and Sorrento from 1987 to 1993. It was replaced by the MV Queenscliff.

In 2004 the ferry was sighted docked in the Tamar River in Launceston, Tasmania. In July 2008 the Peninsula Princess was brought back into service on the Queenscliff – Sorrento route, when one of the larger ferries was in dry dock.

In 2009 the ferry temporarily operated the Bruny Island Ferry route, replacing the Mirambeena while it underwent maintenance.

The ferry has operated the Queenscliff - Sorrento route when the MV Queenscliff underwent a refit and maintenance in mid-2011 and again in July and August 2013. The ferry was re introduced into service in December 2022 while the MV Queenscliff suffered mechanical problems which was sent to Geelong for engineering for an unknown duration.

== In popular culture ==
The "Peninsula Princess" was featured in the popular children's TV program "Round The Twist", in the season 2 episode 'Pink Bow Tie', first broadcast in 1992.
