= Veteran Isles =

Islands in South Australia

- Location within South Australia

Geography
- Location: Great Australian Bight
- Coordinates: 33°44′34″S 134°17′05″E
- Area: 14 ha (35 acres)
- Highest elevation: 82 m (269 ft)

Administration
- Australia

The Veteran Isles (French: Île du Vétéran; also known as the Veteran Islands) is a pair of islands in the Australian state of South Australia which is part of the Pearson Isles which itself is part of the larger island group known as the Investigator Group. It is located about 69 kilometres (43 miles) west south-west of Cape Finniss on the west coast of Eyre Peninsula. It was discovered as part of the Pearson Isles by Matthew Flinders on 13 February 1802. The island was given its name in August 1969 in order to preserve a name used within the locality by the Baudin expedition. The island has enjoyed protected area status since at least 1972 and since 2011, it been part of the Investigator Group Wilderness Protection Area.

== Description ==
Veteran Isles is a pair of peaks located about 1 kilometre (0.62 miles) south of Pearson Island and about 0.5 kilometres (0.31 miles) apart. The northern island rises to a height of 82 metres (269 feet) above sea level while the south island reaches a height of 25–26 metres (82–85 feet). One source reports a combined area of 14 hectares (35 acres) for both islands. The northern island “retains pockets of granitic soil’ that supports a shrubland on its upper levels while southern island is bare of soil and therefore vegetation due to wave action. As 1996, access via boat was suggested as being “hazardous” due to the combination of a steep shoreline and sea conditions that need to be calm.

== Formation, geology and oceanography ==
The Veteran Isles were formed along with the rest of the Pearson Isles about 10,500 years ago following the rise of sea levels at the start of the Holocene. Geologically, the Veteran Isles and the other parts of the Pearson Isles are the summits of an inselberg partially concealed by sea level rise. The waters adjoining Veteran Isles are shown on Admiralty Charts as falling immediately to depths equal and greater than 50 metres (160 feet) from the Isles' shoreline.

== Flora and fauna ==
=== Flora ===
As of 1996, the north island supported low shrublands dominated respectively by two species - marsh saltbush and twiggy daisy-bush. As of 1996, the southern island was reported as being bare of soil and vegetation presumably due to being washed away by swells breaking over the island.

=== Fauna ===
Vertebrate animals observed on both islands consist of mammals, birds and reptiles. The northern island has been observed in 1980 as being used as a haul out both by Australian sea lions and New Zealand fur seals, although a survey conducted in 2014 found no fur seals to be present. Bird species which are considered to be residents include sooty oystercatcher, little penguin and rock parrot while species observed on the island such as Cape Barren geese are considered to be visitors. Reptiles are represented by the marbled gecko, the four-toed earless skink and the peninsula dragon. The southern island has been observed as being used as a haul out by New Zealand fur seals, although a survey conducted in 2014 revealed the possible use of the island as a breeding site. Other species observed on the island in 1980 and which are considered to be visiting include Australian sea lion, sooty oystercatcher and Pacific gull.

== History ==
=== European discovery ===
Veteran Isles is part of the island group sighted by Matthew Flinders on Saturday, 13 February 1802 and who subsequently named the group as the Pearson Isles on the same day.

== Nomenclature ==
The pair of islands was officially named in August 1969 by the South Australian government as the “Veteran Isles”, being the anglicised version of “Iles du Veteran”, in response to the following recommendation made by the Nomenclature Committee in 1965 within the then Department of Lands:

The Committee recommends the adoption of the names "Veteran Isles" for the two small islands in the Pearson Islands and "Dorothee Island" for the southernmost island in this group. It is with some reservations that the Committee makes this recommendation as these names were first used on the chart of Captain Baudin's voyage prepared by F Peron and L de Freycinet and difficulty is experienced in relating islands shown in this chart to present day Admiralty Charts but as these names do not appear on modern charts this recommendation is a means of perpetuating them in the general area of the first use'.

== Protected areas status ==
The Veteran Isles are first mentioned as specifically receiving protected area status in 1972 as part of the Investigator Group Conservation Park proclaimed under the National Parks and Wildlife Act 1972 for the purpose of protecting “delicate island ecology and Australian sea lion and New Zealand fur seal haul-out areas”. On 25 August 2011, it was one of the islands excised from the Investigator Group Conservation Park to form the Investigator Group Wilderness Protection Area. Since 2012, the waters adjoining Veteran Isles have been part of a sanctuary zone in the Investigator Marine Park.

== See also ==
- List of islands of Australia
- Investigator Islands Important Bird Area
