= Dorothee Island =

Island in South Australia

- Location within South Australia

Geography
- Location: Great Australian Bight
- Coordinates: 33°44′34″S 134°17′05″E
- Area: 56 ha (140 acres)
- Highest elevation: 140 m (460 ft)

Administration
- Australia

Dorothee Island (French: Ile Dorothee) is an island in the Australian state of South Australia which is part of the Pearson Isles which itself is part of the larger island grouping known as the Investigator Group. It is located about 69 kilometres (43 miles) west south-west of Cape Finniss on the west coast of Eyre Peninsula. It was discovered as part of the Pearson Isles by Matthew Flinders on 13 February 1802. The island was given its name in August 1969 in order to preserve a name used within the locality by the Baudin expedition. The island has enjoyed protected area status since at least 1972 and since 2011, it been part of the Investigator Group Wilderness Protection Area.

== Description ==
Dorothee Island is located about 4 kilometres (2.5 miles) south of Pearson Island and about 69 kilometres (43 miles) west-southwest of Cape Finniss on the west coast of the Eyre Peninsula in South Australia. It is part of the island group known as the Pearson Isles. The island has an area of about 56 hectares (140 acres). The island has undergone extensive erosion with the result that a large crevasse bisects the island in the east-west direction, forming a pair of peaks. The north side reaches a height of 140 metres (460 feet) while the south side reaches a height of 102 metres (335 feet). The top of both peaks each “retains some pockets of soil, predominantly coarse and granitic but with small patches of calcareous sandy loam”. The island’s east coast is reported in 1996 as providing “enough shelter to allow a cautious landing in all but severe swells”.

== Formation, geology and oceanography ==
Dorothee Island was formed along with the rest of the Pearson Isles about 10,500 years ago following the rise of sea levels at the start of the Holocene. Geologically, Dorothee Island and the other parts of the Pearson Isles are the summits of an inselberg partially concealed by sea level rise. Dorothee Island’s southern and western sides fall to water depths greater than 50 metres (160 feet) within 500 metres (1,600 feet) from its shoreline.

== Flora and fauna ==
=== Flora ===
As of 1996, Dorothee Island retained significant soil around its twin peaks and shelter to support the following five plant associations which are informed by the specific characteristics of the soil and the associated exposure to the elements. The deepest and the most sheltered granitic soils are vegetated by a heath dominated by twiggy daisy-bush followed by other heath species such as common correa, black-anther flax lily and coast beard-heath as well as two small patches of Cape Leeuwin wattle. A “calcareous sandy loam” associated with the central crevasse on the northern half of the island supports a grey saltbush heath. The granitic soils associated with the island’s southern peak support a shrubland of marsh saltbush that forms a perimeter around the twiggy daisy-bush confined to the peak. The thinnest soils support herbfields dominated by rosy stork's bill. Soils at top of the granite ridges closest to the sea are occupied by herblands of round-leaved pigface.

=== Fauna ===
Vertebrate animals observed on the island include mammals, birds and reptiles. As of 1980 and 1990, mammals are represented by New Zealand fur seals and Australian sea lions who use the island as a haul-out site. Observations of both species published in 2014 advise that only fur seals have been using the island in the recent past as a breeding colony. As of 2006, birds were represented by the following species: nankeen kestrel, Australian raven, barn owl, black cormorant, Cape Barren geese, common starling, crested tern, fork-tailed swift, house sparrow, masked lapwing, Pacific gull, rock parrot, ruddy turnstone, short-tailed shearwater, silvereye, silver gull, welcome swallow, white-faced heron, white-faced storm petrel and breeding populations of the following species: little penguin, sooty oystercatcher, white-faced storm petrel and short-tailed shearwater. As of 2006, reptiles were represented by the following species: peninsula dragon and four-toed earless skink.

== History ==
=== European discovery ===
Dorothee Island is part of the island group which was first sighted by Matthew Flinders on Saturday, 13 February 1802 and who subsequently named the group as the Pearson Isles on the same day.

=== Scientific research ===
Dorothee Island is one of a number of islands in South Australia where specifically marked locations known as “photopoints” have been established for photographing vegetation at periodic intervals in order to identify changes occurring in the absence of a permanent human presence or introduced pests such as rabbits.

== Nomenclature ==
The island was officially named as Dorothee Island, being the anglicised version of “Ile Dorothee”, in August 1969 by the South Australian government in response to the following recommendation made by the Nomenclature Committee in 1965 within the then Department of Lands:

The Committee recommends the adoption of the names "Veteran Isles" for the two small islands in the Pearson Islands and "Dorothee Island" for the southernmost island in this group. It is with some reservations that the Committee makes this recommendation as these names were first used on the chart of Captain Baudin's voyage prepared by F Peron and L de Freycinet and difficulty is experienced in relating islands shown in this chart to present day Admiralty Charts but as these names do not appear on modern charts this recommendation is a means of perpetuating them in the general area of the first use'.

== Protected areas status ==
Dorothee Island is first mentioned as specifically receiving protected area status in 1972 as part of the Investigator Group Conservation Park proclaimed under the National Parks and Wildlife Act 1972 for the purpose of protecting “delicate island ecology and Australian sea lion and New Zealand fur seal haul-out areas”. On 25 August 2011, it was one of the islands excised from the Investigator Group Conservation Park to form the Investigator Group Wilderness Protection Area. Since 2012, the waters adjoining Dorothee Island have been part of a sanctuary zone in the Investigator Marine Park.

== See also ==
- List of islands of Australia
- List of little penguin colonies
- Investigator Islands Important Bird Area
