= Pearson Island =

Island in South Australia

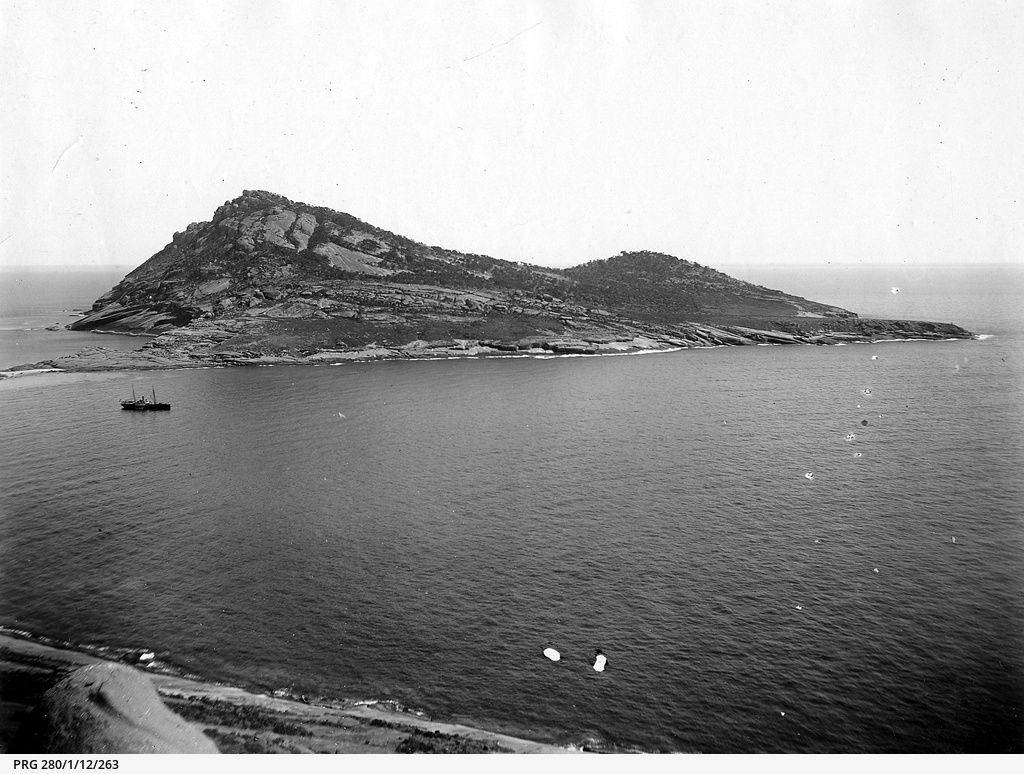
- View of Pearson Island from its south end c. 1914

- Location within South Australia

Geography
- Location: Great Australian Bight
- Coordinates: 33°57′39″S 134°15′54″E
- Area: 213 ha (530 acres)
- Highest elevation: 238 m (781 ft)

Administration
- Australia

Pearson Island is an island located in the Australian state of South Australia within the Pearson Isles an island group located in the larger group known as the Investigator Group about 63 kilometres (39 miles) southwest by west of Cape Finniss on the west coast of Eyre Peninsula. The group was discovered and named by Matthew Flinders on 13 February 1802. The island group has enjoyed protected area status since the 1960s and since 2011, it has been part of the Investigator Group Wilderness Protection Area. Pearson Island is notable both for its colony of Pearson Island Rock wallaby and for being a destination for scientific research.

== Description ==
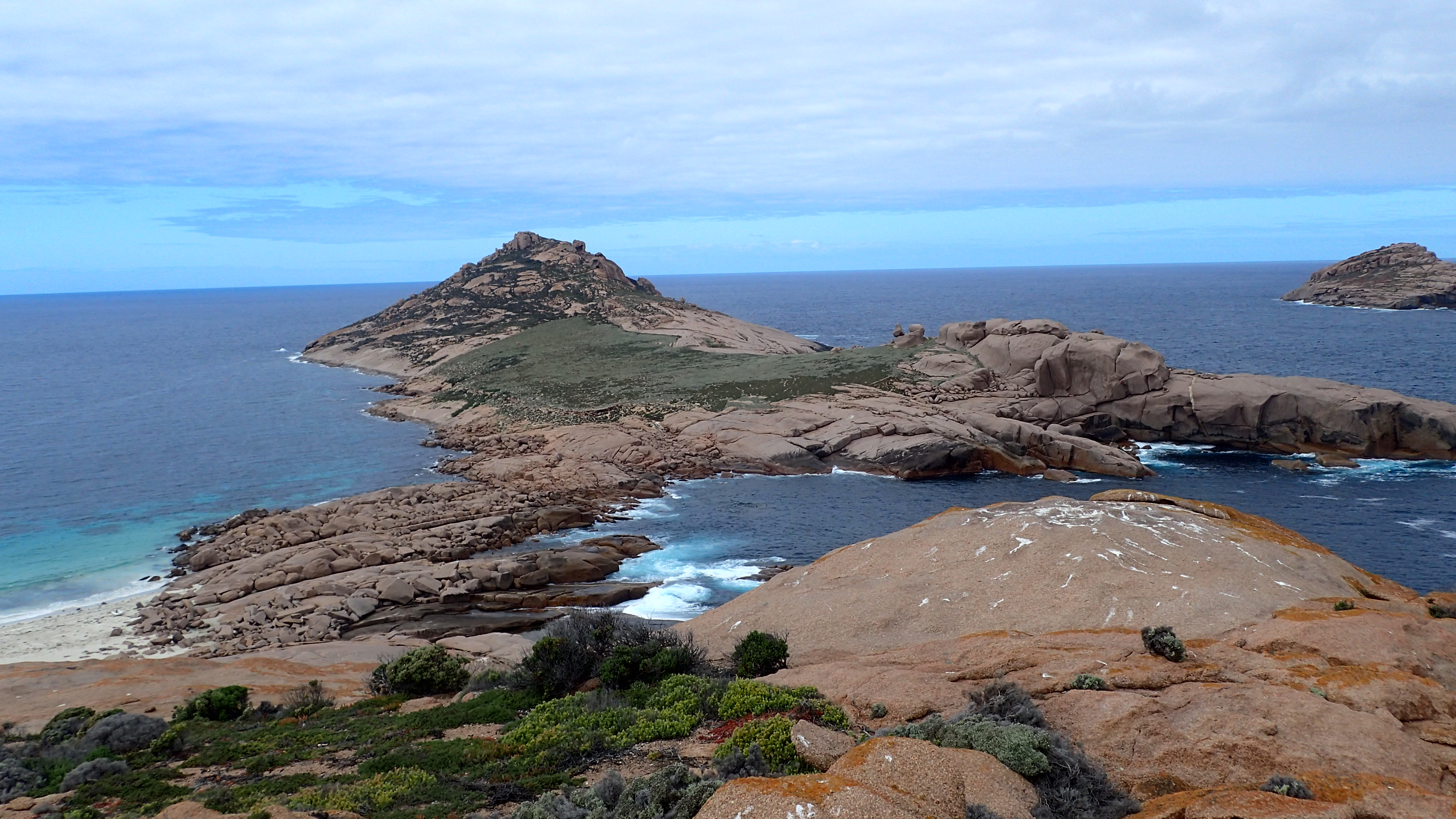
View of southern end of Pearson Island

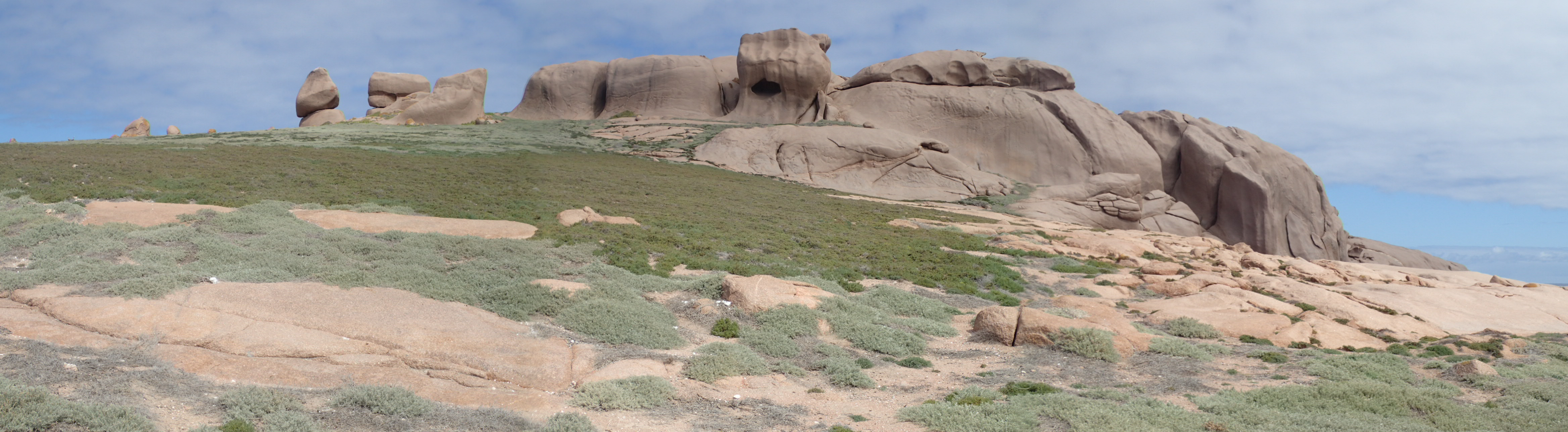
Rock formations and southern end of South Pearson Island

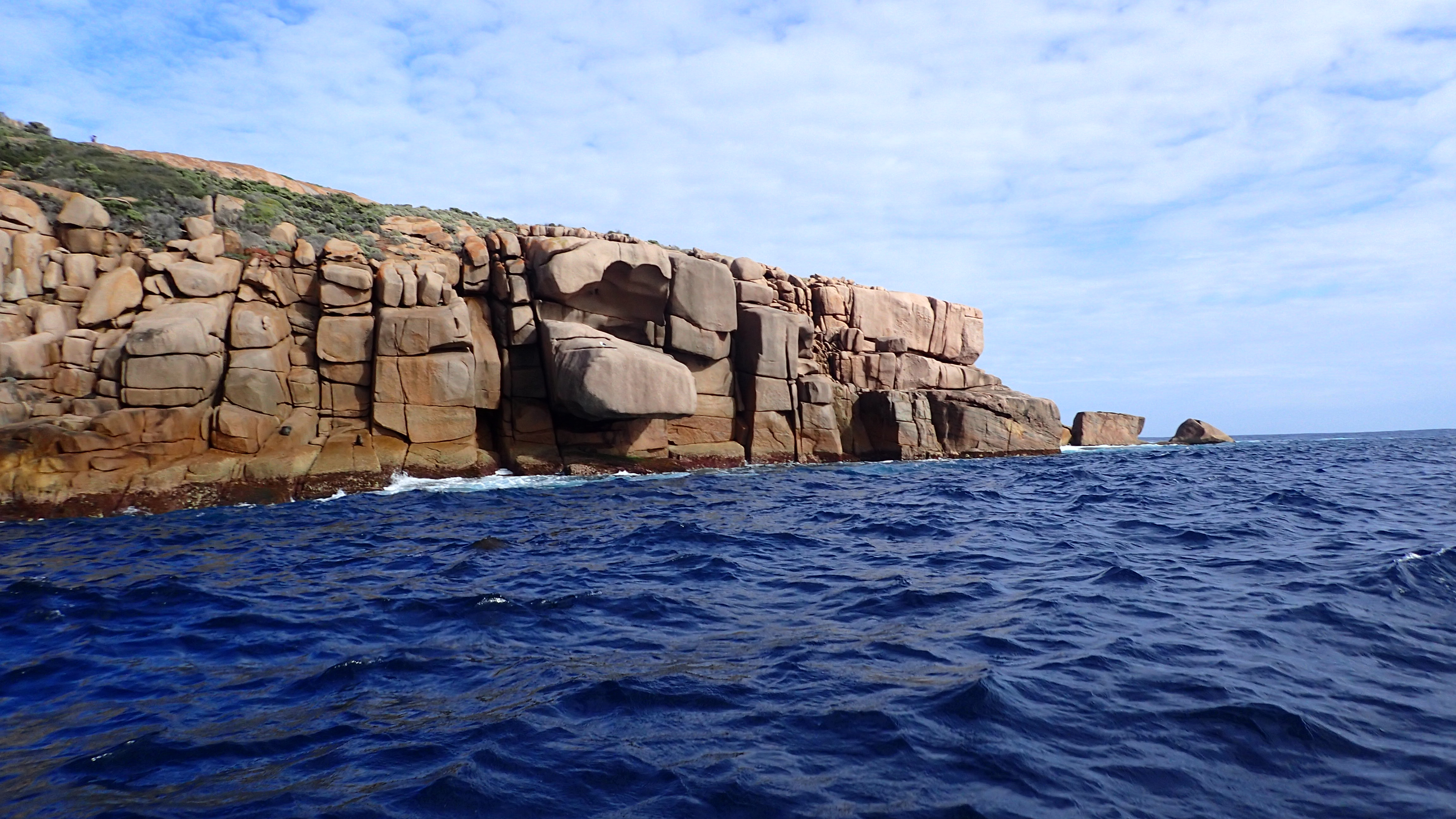
Northern anchorage of Pearson Island

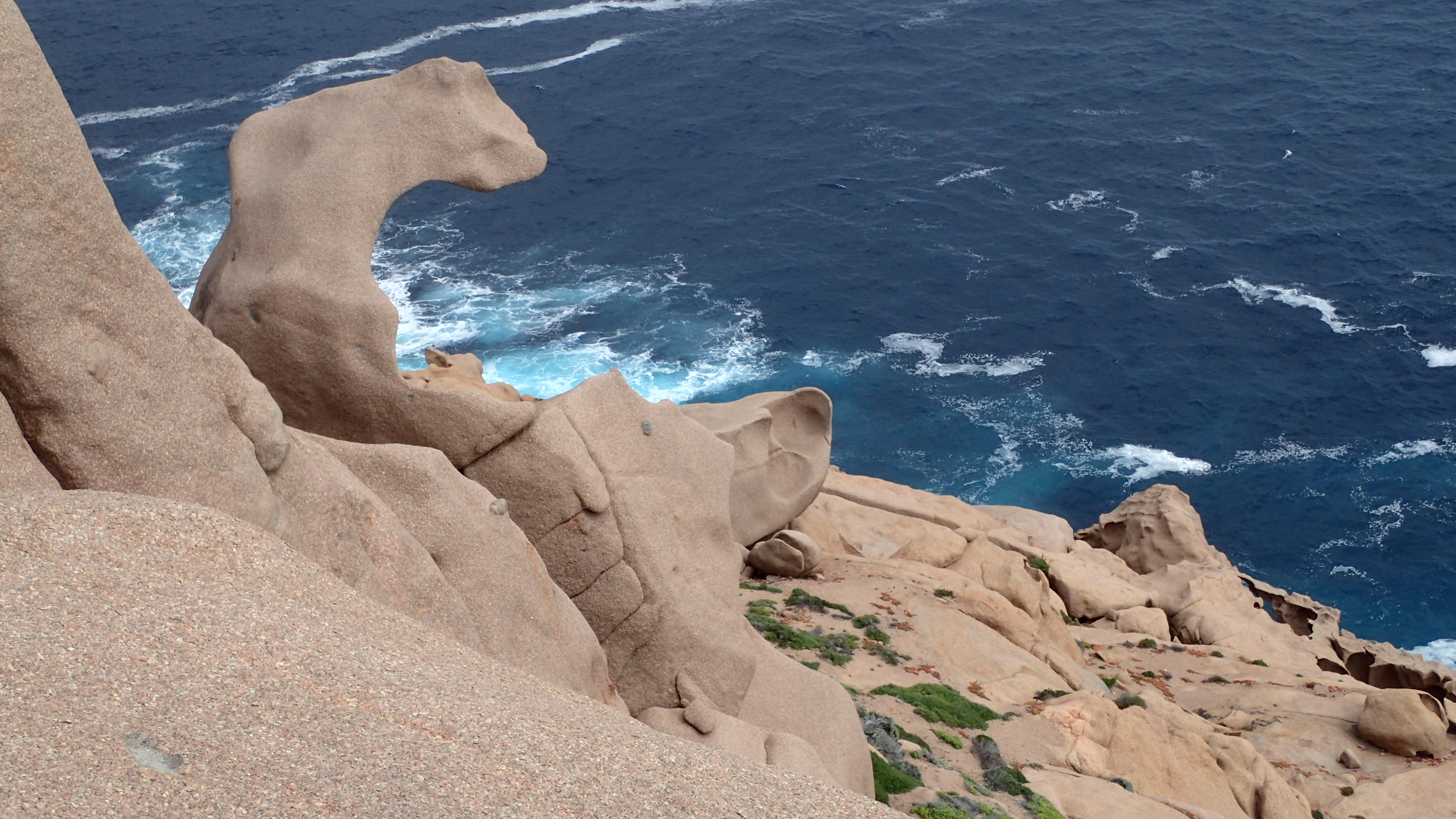
"The Craw" rock formation on the northern side of Pearson Island

Pearson Island is located about 63 kilometres (39 miles) south west by west of Cape Finniss and about 25 kilometres (16 miles) south west of Flinders Island. It is the largest of four islands that form the island group known as the Pearson Isles or the Pearson Islands.

It consists of one land mass with two relatively smaller peaks rising out of the sea in an arc extending to the south east via a spit of rock connected to its most southerly point. The arc encloses a bay known as "Anchorage Cove" which is sheltered from the weather both from the west and the south and which can be respectively used as an anchorage and as a landing point. The three parts of the island are informally referred to in one source respectively as the "north section", the "middle section" and the "south section". An unnamed rock which is permanently dry is located immediately west of the "south section" of Pearson Island.

The island has an area of 213 hectares (530 acres). Its highest point is a feature called "Hill 781" with a height of 238 metres (781 feet) above sea level and which is located in the south west end of the North section and which is named after its height in the imperial unit of measurement. "Hill 781" and two other hills, "North Hill" and "East Hill" on the "north section" are of a height greater than 200 metres (660 feet) while the highest point on the remainder of the island is "South Hill" on the "south section" with a height of 115 metres (377 feet).

The "north section" has two valleys - one opening onto a bay to the north known as "East Cove" while the other valley opens onto an unnamed cove on the east side of the island. Each is enclosed on one side by the ridge line on the west side of the island that connects "North Hill" and "Hill 781" and by a ridge line that connects "Hill 781" to "East Hill". Each valley has a drainage system which drains into a creek which are respectively known as "North Creek" and "Main Creek".

== Formation, geology and oceanography ==
Pearson Island was formed along with the rest of the Pearson Isles about 10,500 years ago following the rise of sea levels at the start of the Holocene.

Geologically, Pearson Island and the other members of the Pearson Isles are the summits of an inselberg partially concealed by sea level rise. Pearson Island exhibits landforms caused firstly by the formation of the inselberg and the characteristics of the granite from which it formed and secondly by the erosive and formative processes associated with the sea.

Firstly, landforms associated with the formation of the inselberg and with its constituent material respectively are sheet structures and orthogonal jointing. Sheet structures which are flat or curvilinear layers of granite which have separated from the body of the inselberg due to stresses within the overall granite body. The presence of orthogonal jointing within the sheet structures at right angles to the plane of the sheet structures create access for moisture into joints resulting in enlargement of the joints and the ultimate fracture of the sheet into "cubic, quadrangular or rhomboidal blocks" which can become either individual or field of free-standing granite boulders of 2–3 metres (6 feet 7 inches – 9 feet 10 inches) in height.

Secondly, the action of the sea has resulted in the erosion of the "lower inclined sheet structures" on the west side of the island at sea level resulting in the formation of a steep cliff face when compared to the relatively flat profile of the east side of the island. The eastern side of the island including the coastline of "Anchorage Cove" has layers of an aeolianite limestone up to 6–9 metres (20–30 feet) above the present sea level which suggests that sea level was higher at some time in the past.

The waters around Pearson Island fall to water depths greater than 50 metres (160 feet) within 500 metres (1,600 feet) from the island's coastline.

== Flora and fauna ==
=== Flora ===
As of 1996, at least six plant associations are reported as being present on Pearson Island.

Firstly, the parts of the island above the height of 100 metres (330 feet) above sea level support a woodland of sheoak where both shelter and soil is present. The woodland's density increases with altitude with the result that individual sheoaks will reach a height of 3 metres (9.8 feet) and support an understorey of species such as dryland tea tree, ruby saltbush and rock fern.

Secondly, below the altitude of 100 metres (330 feet), two Melaleuca species, dryland tea tree and swamp paperbark, are present as thickets with the former species being reported as the "most widespread" of the two species.

Thirdly, a scrub of swamp paperbark is present along the Main Creek watercourse in the eastern valley where favourable conditions such as "highly saline" soil and the shelter provided by the valley are present. Areas of the island close to its coastline have a heath cover.

Fourthly, where the soil is granitic in origin, the heath is dominated by twiggy daisy-bush with sub-ordinate species such as common correa and shore westringia.

Fifthly, grey saltbush dominates in the limestone-derived soils while marsh saltbush is present in both soil types.

Sixthly, a herbfield featuring both karkalla and Austral stork's bill and fringed with round-leaved pigface is found on "the thinnest, most exposed soils on top of granite outcrops fronting the sea".

=== Fauna ===
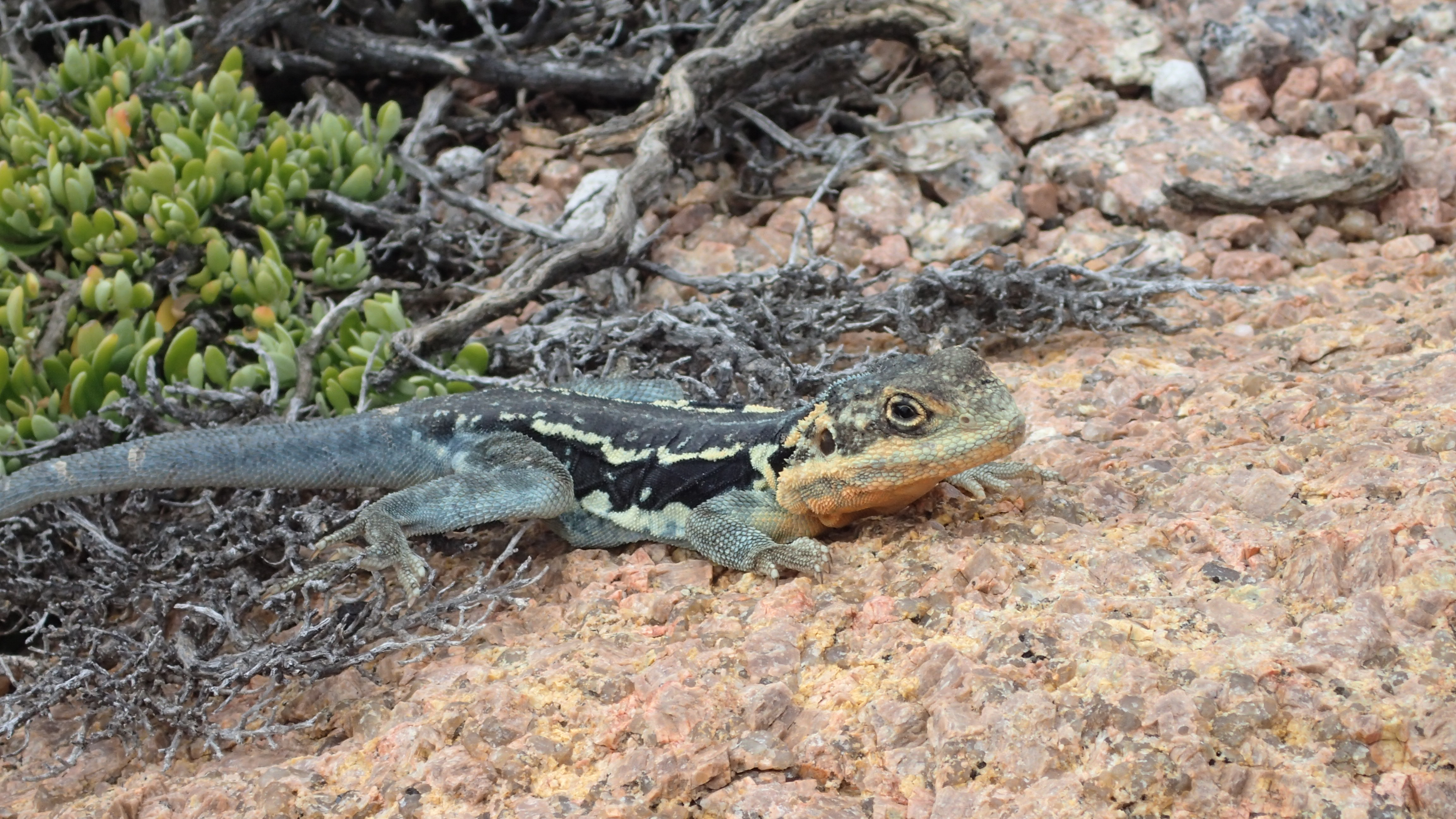
Peninsula dragon on Pearson Island

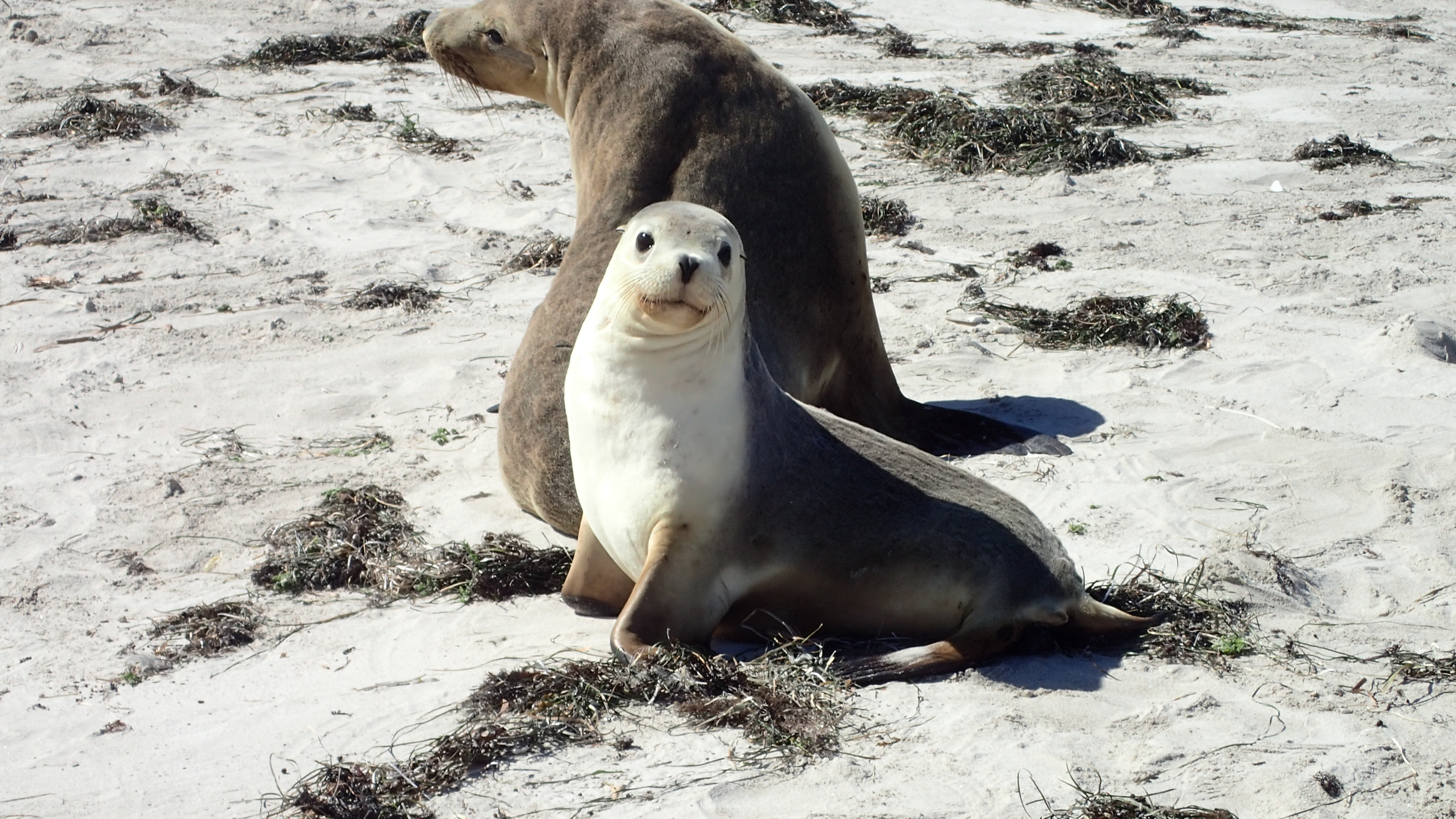
Sea lion mother and cub on Pearson Island

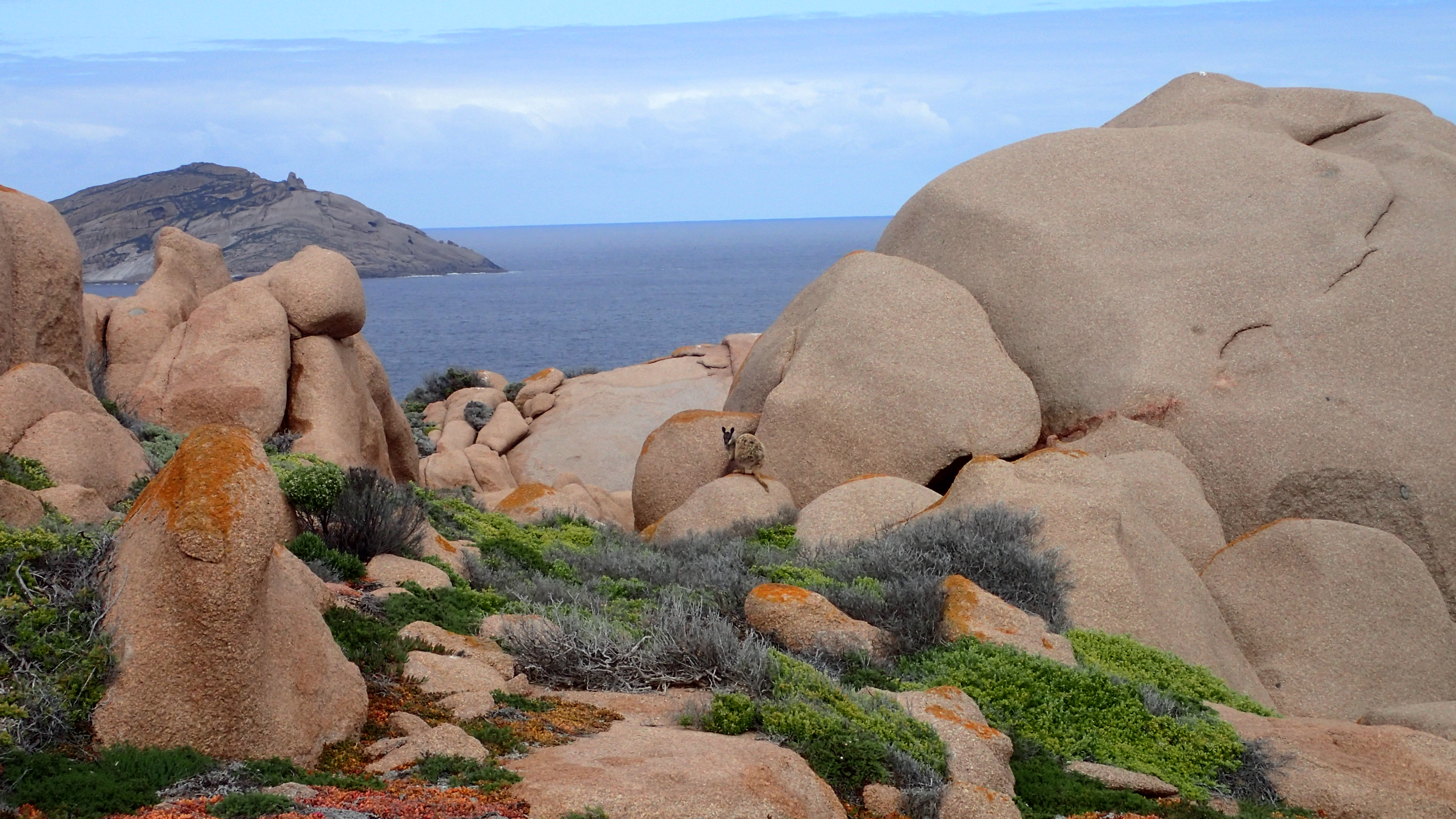
Top of Pearson Island and Pearson Island rock wallaby

Vertebrate animals observed on Pearson Island consist of mammals, birds and reptiles. An account from 1911 mentioned seals, Cape Barren geese, and a raptor's nest at the island's summit made from a ton of sticks. Some members of the visiting party hunted the Pearson Island rock wallaby, while another inspected the island's small lizards. An "abundance of seals" was noted, and some oystercatchers (then known as "redbills") were seen. Australasian snapper, Western blue groper and rock cod were caught in adjacent waters. Arthur Searcy recalled catching 30 and 40 lb groper there.

As of 1996, the following mammals have been observed - Pearson Island rock-wallaby, bush rat and a breeding colony of Australian sea lion. The Australian sea lion, previously known as the "hair seal" has been seen on the island since the early 20th century.

As of 2006, the following birds have been observed - Richard's pipit, wedge tailed eagle, white-faced heron, eastern reef egret, ruddy turnstone, masked woodswallow, galah, red-necked stint, Cape Barren geese, Horsfield's rufous tailed, Australian raven, white-fronted chat, crimson chat, rockhopper penguin, nankeen kestrel, white bellied sea eagle, welcome swallow, silver gull, Pacific gull, singing honeyeater, budgerigah, rock parrot, golden whistler, osprey, house sparrow, red-capped robin, red-tailed tropicbird, great cormorant, white-browed scrubwren, crested tern, common starling, hooded dotterel, barn owl, masked plover, silver eye and breeding colonies of fairy tern, little penguin and sooty oystercatcher.

As of 1996, the following reptiles have been observed - marbled gecko, peninsula dragon and four-toed earless skink.

==== Pearson Island rock-wallaby ====
Pearson Island rock-wallaby (Petrogale lateralis pearsoni) is a sub-species of the black-footed rock-wallaby which became isolated on what is now Pearson Island by sea level rise about 10,500 years ago. Specimens were first collected by F Woods Jones in 1920 and described as a new species in 1922. It was subsequently re-described as a sub-species of the black-footed rock-wallaby. The rock-wallabies originally occupied the "north section" of the island until 1960 when six specimens were accidentally released onto the "middle" and "south" sections of the island. By 1976, the six specimens had reproduced into a population estimated at 150 individuals compared with a population on the "north section" estimated between 250 and 300 in 1975. In 1974 and 1975 respectively, groups of rock-wallabies from the "north section" of Pearson Island were transferred to Thistle Island and Wedge Island in Spencer Gulf where the populations are reported in 2008 as being respectively 500 and 200 individuals. Previous experiments had been undertaken with the support of Captain P. Weir and Captain George Justice, who relocating pairs of wallabies to Liguanea, Price, Greenly and Four Hummocks islands.

==== Little penguin ====
Little penguins were mentioned as being present on Pearson Island as early as 1914 and were described as "plentiful" in 1923. In 1933, J. T. Mortlock wrote that he saw "a good many" penguins on Pearson Island. In 2006, the population of the little penguin colony on Pearson Island was estimated to be 12,000 birds, making it the largest single colony in South Australia. As of 2011, the Pearson Island colony's status was unknown. In 2013, a tour operator based on Kangaroo Island visited the island and reported that the little penguins were "missing". A little penguin survey was scheduled to be conducted on Pearson Island by the South Australian Research and Development Institute (SARDI) in 2013. As of March 2014, the SARDI survey's results remain unpublished.

== History ==
=== European discovery and use ===
==== European discovery ====
Pearson Island is part of the island group which was first sighted by Matthew Flinders on Saturday, 13 February 1802 and subsequently named by Flinders on the same day as the Pearson Isles.

==== Naming of the island ====
The name of island derived from that of the group. While the name is widely used, it is not officially named. It also is referred to as the "North Island" within the context of the Pearson Isles by a number of sources.

==== Agricultural and other economic use ====
Pearson Island was briefly used for the grazing of sheep in the 19th century by Anton Schlink, who had leased nearby Flinders Island for the same purpose, however, with unsuccessful results due to the island's "unfavourable, rocky and dry nature" and difficulties with stock management. The waters immediately adjoining the island have been used for commercial fishing, recreational fishing and recreational diving.

==== Scientific research ====
Pearson Island has been the subject of scientific interest since the early twentieth century in respect to its geology, its ecology and its terrestrial and marine flora and fauna. The island and its companions are an attractive destination for scientists because of their relative remoteness, the relative low human impact and the absence of introduced pests.

While first sighted in 1802 by Flinders, the island group was not visited by Robert Brown, the botanist accompanying Flinders, and the literature suggest that it was not visited by any of the scientists accompanying the Baudin expedition visited the island to make observations.

Pearson Island was first visited by Edgar Waite, the then director of the South Australian Museum in 1914 followed by F Woods Jones, the then chair of anatomy at the University of Adelaide in 1920.

The island was then the subject of three expeditions organised by the Royal Society of South Australia (RSSA) in the years 1923, 1960 and 1969. The 1923 expedition was funded by Sir George Murray, the then chief justice of Supreme Court of South Australia and led by F Woods Jones. The 1960 expedition was led by T. D. Campbell, anthropologist and a former Professor of Dentistry at the University of Adelaide. The 1969 expedition was a joint project conducted in conjunction with the then Department of Fisheries and Fauna Conservation and was led by scientists Scoresby Shepherd and I.M. Thomas.

The most recent expedition discussed in the literature is an expedition organised by the then Department of Environment and Heritage in 2006 to visit islands within the Investigator Group including Pearson Island and included a range of personnel from various government agencies including archaeologists, botanists, geologists and zoologists.

==== Navigation aid ====
A navigation aid has been located on the middle section of Pearson Island since 1968. It consists of a 2 m (6 ft 7 in) high tower with a group flashing light placed at a height of 79 m (259 ft) above sea level. The land on which the aid is located is owned by the Australian Maritime Safety Authority (AMSA) which is the Australian government agency responsible for navigation aids. Access to the island for the maintenance of the navigation aid is via helicopter.

== Protected area status ==
Pearson Island first received protected area status as part of the Pearson Isles on 27 July 1916 as part of a bird protection district declared under the Birds Protection Act 1900 and the Animals Protection Act 1912, to protect the black-footed rock wallaby.

The Pearson Isles were subsequently proclaimed as part of a fauna reserve declared under the Fauna Conservation Act 1964 either on 1 September 1966 or 16 March 1967. The island and other members of the group became part of the Investigator Group Conservation Park proclaimed under the National Parks and Wildlife Act 1972 in 1972 to "protect delicate island ecology and Australian sea lion and New Zealand fur seal haul-out areas". On 25 August 2011, it and the rest of the Pearson Isles were excised from the Investigator Group Conservation Park to form the Investigator Group Wilderness Protection Area.

Since 2012, the waters adjoining Pearson Island have been part of a sanctuary zone in the Investigator Marine Park.

== See also ==
- List of islands of Australia
- List of little penguin colonies
- Investigator Islands Important Bird Area

== Citations and references ==
=== References ===
- "(Lighthouses) Listed by State (i.e. lighthouses & navigation aids)". Australian Lighthouses. Archived from the original on 26 January 2014.
- Baker, J.L (2004). Towards a System of Ecologically Representative Marine Protected Areas in South Australian Marine Bioregions - Technical Report. Part 2 (PDF). Department for Environment and Heritage, South Australia.
- Baker, J.L (2004). Towards a System of Ecologically Representative Marine Protected Areas in South Australian Marine Bioregions - Technical Report. Part 3 (PDF). Department for Environment and Heritage, South Australia.
- Chalmers, Neil C (2006). "Expedition to the Investigator Isles(sic)" (PDF). MESA Journal. 42: 40. Archived from the original (PDF) on 2 August 2008.
- Chalmers, Neil C (2008). "Investigator Group Expedition 2006: Geology of the Basement Lithologies of the Investigator Group, South Australia". Transactions of the Royal Society of South Australia. 132 (2): 74–80. doi:10.1080/03721426.2008.10887095. S2CID 128287923.
- Anon (2006). Island Parks of Western Eyre Peninsula Management Plan (PDF). Adelaide: Department for Environment and Heritage (DEH), South Australia. ISBN 978-1-921238-18-5.
- Investigator Marine Park Management Plan 2012 (PDF). Department for Environment Water and Natural Resources (DEWNR). 2012.
- Flinders, Matthew (1966) [1814]. A Voyage to Terra Australis: undertaken for the purpose of completing the discovery of that vast country, and prosecuted in the years 1801, 1802, and 1803 in His Majesty's ship the Investigator, and subsequently in the armed vessel Porpoise and Cumberland Schooner; with an account of the shipwreck of the Porpoise, arrival of the Cumberland at Mauritius, and imprisonment of the commander during six years and a half in that island (Facsimile ed.). Adelaide: Libraries Board of South Australia.
- Lennon, Michelle Jones; Taggart, David A.; Temple-Smith, Peter D.; Eldridge, Mark D. B. (12 September 2011). "The impact of isolation and bottlenecks on genetic diversity in the Pearson Island population of the black-footed rock-wallaby (Petrogale lateralis pearsoni; Marsupialia: Macropodidae)". Australian Mammalogy. 33 (2): 152–161. doi:10.1071/AM11011.
- A.C., Robinson; Canty, P.; Mooney, T.; Rudduck, P. (1996). South Australia's offshore islands (PDF). Canberra: Australian Heritage Commission. ISBN 978-0-644350-11-2.
- Royal Australian Navy (RAN) Hydrographic Service Hydrographic Department (1979). Streaky Bay to Whidbey Islands (chart no. Aus 342).
- Robinson, A.C. (28 November 1980). "Notes on the mammals and reptiles of Pearson, Dorothee and Greenly Islands, South Australia". Transactions of the Royal Society of South Australia. 104 (5): 93–99.
- Robinson, A.C.; Murray-Jones, S.; Shepherd, S. A. (2008). "Investigator Group Expedition 2006: Formation of the Islands and Introductory Narrative". Transactions of the Royal Society of South Australia. 132 (2): 45–50. doi:10.1080/03721426.2008.10887092. S2CID 83415333.
- "The Flora and Fauna of Nuyts Archipelago and the Investigator Group". Transactions of the Royal Society of South Australia. 47: 79–366. 22 December 1923.
- "Pearson Island Expedition 1969". Transactions of the Royal Society of South Australia. 95 (Part 3): 121–183. 15 October 1971.
- South Australia. Department of Marine and Harbors (DMH) (1985), The Waters of South Australia a series of charts, sailing notes and coastal photographs, Dept. of Marine and Harbors, South Australia, ISBN 978-0-7243-7603-2
- "Wilderness Advisory Committee Annual Report 2012-13 (WAC)" (PDF). Annual Report. Department for Environment Water and Natural Resources: 16–17. September 2013. ISSN 1832-9357.
- Wiebkin, Annelise (2011), Conservation management priorities for little penguin populations in Gulf St Vincent. Report to Adelaide and Mount Lofty Ranges Natural Resources Management Board SARDI Publication No. F2011/000188-1. SARDI Research Report Series No.588 (PDF), South Australian Research and Development Institute (Aquatic Sciences)
