= Pearson Isles =

Island group in South Australia

- Location within South Australia

Geography
- Location: Great Australian Bight
- Coordinates: 33°57′39″S 134°15′54″E

Administration
- Australia

Pearson Isles (also called the Pearson Islands, Pearson Group and Pearson Archipelago) is an island group located in the Australian state of South Australia about 65 kilometres (40 miles) to 72 kilometres (45 miles) west south-west of Cape Finniss on the west coast of Eyre Peninsula within the larger island group, the Investigator Group. The group was discovered and named by Matthew Flinders on 13 February 1802. The group has four members - Pearson Island, a pair of islands known as the Veteran Isles and Dorothee Island. The island group has enjoyed protected area status starting in 1916 and since 2011, it has been part of the Investigator Group Wilderness Protection Area. The island group is notable as a venue for scientific research.

== Description ==
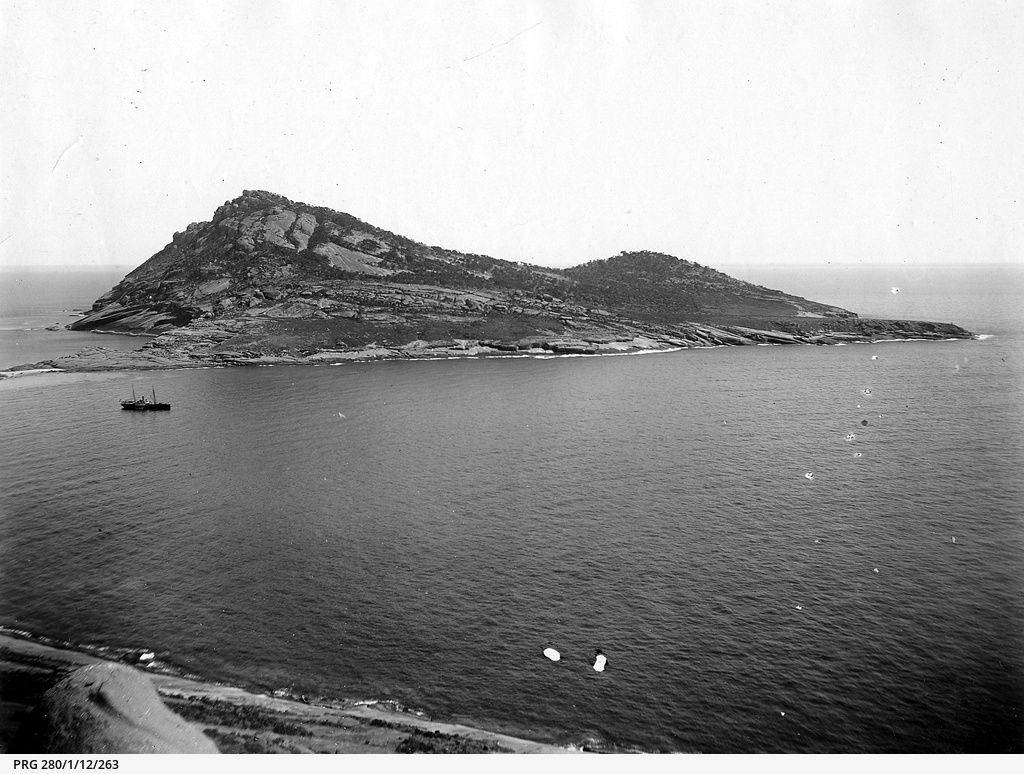
A distant view of the Pearson Isles off the west coast of Eyre Peninsula

=== Generally ===
Pearson Isles is an island group located in waters from between 65 kilometres (40 miles) to 72 kilometres (45 miles) west south-west of Cape Finniss on the west coast of Eyre Peninsula in South Australia. The group consists of the following islands in order of increasing distance from the Australian continental coastline - Pearson Island, Veteran Isles and Dorothee Island. While Pearson Isles is the official name, the group is also known in some sources as the ”Pearson Islands”, the “Pearson Group” and the “Pearson Archipelago”.

=== Pearson Island ===
Pearson Island is located about 63 kilometres (39 miles) south west by west of Cape Finniss and about 25 kilometres (16 miles) south west of Flinders Island. It consists of one land mass with two relatively smaller peaks rising out of the sea in an arc extending to the south east via a spit of rock connected to its most southerly point . The arc encloses a bay and a beach which are sheltered from weather both from the west and the south and which can be respectively used as an anchorage and as a landing point. The three parts of the island are informally referred to in one source respectively as the “north section”, the “middle section” and the “south section”. The island has an area of 213 hectares (530 acres). Its highest point is a feature called “Hill 781” with a height of 238 metres (781 feet) above sea level. “Hill 781” and two other hills, “North Hill” and “East Hill”, which are both of a height greater than 200 metres (660 feet) are located on the “north section” while the highest point on the remainder of the island is “South Hill” on the “south section”with a height of 115 metres (377 feet).

=== Veteran Isles ===
Veteran Isles is a pair of peaks located about 1 kilometre (0.62 miles) south of Pearson Island and about 0.5 kilometres (0.31 miles) apart. The northern island rises to a height of 82 metres (269 feet) above sea level while the south island reaches a height of 25–26 metres (82–85 feet). One source reports a combined area of 14 hectares (35 acres) for both islands. The northern island “retains pockets of granitic soil’ that supports a shrubland on its upper levels while southern island is bare of soil and therefore vegetation due to wave action. As 1996, access via boat was suggested as being “hazardous” due to the combination of a steep shoreline and sea conditions that need to be calm.

=== Dorothee Island ===
Dorothee Island which is located about 4 kilometres (2.5 miles) south of Pearson Island has an area of about 56 hectares (140 acres). The island has undergone extensive erosion with the result that a large crevasse bisects the island in the east-west direction, forming a pair of peaks. The north side reaches a height of 140 metres (460 feet) while the south side reaches a height of 102 metres (335 feet). The top of both peaks each “retains some pockets of soil, predominantly coarse and granitic but with small patches of calcareous sandy loam”. The island’s east coast is reported in 1996 as providing “enough shelter to allow a cautious landing in all but severe swells”.

== Formation, geology and oceanography ==
The Pearson Isles were formed about 10,500 years ago following the rise of sea levels at the start of the Holocene. The four members of the Pearson Isles are the peaks of an inselberg remaining after its gradual concealment by sea level rise. The inselberg is composed of a basement rock granite belonging to a group of rocks associated with an event known as the Hiltaba Suite (part of the Gawler Range Volcanics), which is a series of volcanic events occurring about 1,590 million years ago within the area now covered in part by the western Eyre Peninsula, the adjacent interior of the Australian continent and the part of the Great Australian Bight immediately adjoining the western coast of Eyre Peninsula. Landforms on each of the islands are dominated firstly by the granite basement rock and its jointing, and secondly by rock and erosive processes associated with the marine environment. The former class of landforms include “massive curvilinear sheets” on the lower level of the islands and boulders “derived from the breakdown of the sheets” on the upper levels of the islands. The second class of landforms included “remnants of aeolianite-old coastal foredune deposits” associated with a time when the sea level was lowered.

The waters around the Pearson Isles fall to water depths greater than 50 metres (160 feet) within 500 metres (1,600 feet) from the coastline of Pearson Island and to the south and west sides of Dorothee Island.

== History ==
=== European discovery and use ===
==== European discovery ====
Flinders discovered and named the island group on Saturday, 13 February 1802. On the same day, Flinders also nominated it as one of the constituent parts of the Investigator Group. Flinders described the island group as follows:

To the south-west I distinguished several small islands, of which the northernmost and largest is remarkable from two high and sharp-pointed peaks upon it, lying in latitude 33° 57' and longitude 134° 13'. This cluster, as it appeared to be, received the name of Pearson's Isles; but it is possible that what seemed at a distance to be divided into several may form two or three larger islands, or even be one connected land.

==== Nomenclature ====
Flinders never advised the source of the name Pearson. At least five possible sources have been suggested for the island group’s name. The first is that it was named after Flinders’ brother-in-law. However Flinders’ sister did not marry Mr Pearson until 1806, which would suggest that the island group may not have been named until Flinders’ return to the United Kingdom in 1810. The second is that it was named after the mother of Flinders’ second-in-command, Robert Merrick Fowler, whose maiden name is Pearson. This is the source that is cited by the South Australian government. The third is Sir Richard Pearson, a Royal Navy officer notable for his role in the Battle of Flamborough Head during the American Revolutionary War. The fourth which appears in two South Australian government texts is the maiden name of his brother-in-law's mother. The fifth is the maiden name of his brother-in-law's mother where Robert Merrick Fowler is reported as being Flinders’ brother-in-law. However, this source is not supported by biographic information published about both Flinders and Fowler. The Baudin expedition when it visited later in 1802 proposed the following names. Baudin proposed the name “Les Enfans (sic) Perdus” which translates as “The Lost Children” while Freycinet’s chart uses the name “Is du Veteran” (also spelt “Iles du Veteran” (English: Veteran Isles)). Also, the name “Ile Dorothee” (English: Dorothee Island) is reported as being proposed by Freycinet for one of the islands within the group.

The anglicised versions of “Iles du Veteran” and “Ile Dorothee” were officially adopted by the South Australian government in 1969 for the three smaller members of the island group in response to the following recommendation made by the Nomenclature Committee within the then Department of Lands in 1965:

The Committee recommends the adoption of the names "Veteran Isles" for the two small islands in the Pearson Islands and "Dorothee Island" for the southernmost island in this group. It is with some reservations that the Committee makes this recommendation as these names were first used on the chart of Captain Baudin's voyage prepared by F Peron and L de Freycinet and difficulty is experienced in relating islands shown in this chart to present day Admiralty Charts but as these names do not appear on modern charts this recommendation is a means of perpetuating them in the general area of the first use'.

==== Agricultural and other economic use ====
Pearson Island was briefly used for the grazing of sheep in the 19th century by Anton Schlink, who had leased nearby Flinders Island for the same purpose, with unsuccessful results due to the island’s “unfavourable, rocky and dry nature” and difficulties with stock management. The waters around the island group have been used for commercial fishing, recreational fishing and recreational diving.

==== Scientific research ====
The Pearson Isles with particular emphasis on Pearson Island have been the subject of scientific interest since the early twentieth century in respect to its geology, its ecology and its terrestrial and marine flora and fauna. The Isles are an attractive destination for scientists because of their relative remoteness, the relatively low human impact and the absence of introduced pests.

==== Navigation aid ====
A navigation aid has been located on the middle section of Pearson Island since 1968. It consists of a 2 m (6 ft 7 in) high tower with a group flashing light placed at a height of 79 m (259 ft) above sea level.

== Protected areas status ==
The Pearson Isles first received protected area status on 27 July 1916 as part of a bird protection district declared under the Birds Protection Act 1900 and the Animals Protection Act 1912 to protect the population of black-footed rock wallaby living on Pearson island. The Pearson Isles were subsequently proclaimed as a fauna conservation reserve under the Crown Lands Act 1966 on 16 March 1967. The island group and other adjoining islands became part of the Investigator Group Conservation Park proclaimed under the National Parks and Wildlife Act 1972 in 1972 “to protect delicate island ecology and Australian sea lion and New Zealand fur seal haul-out areas”. On 25 August 2011, it was one of the island groups excised from the Investigator Group Conservation Park to form the Investigator Group Wilderness Protection Area. Since 2012, the waters adjoining the Pearson Isles have been part of a sanctuary zone in the Investigator Marine Park.

== See also ==
- List of islands of Australia
- List of archipelagos
- Investigator Islands Important Bird Area

== Citations and references ==
=== References ===
- "(Lighthouses) Listed by State (i.e. lighthouses & navigation aids)". Australian Lighthouses. Archived from the original on 26 January 2014.
- Baker, J.L (2004). Towards a System of Ecologically Representative Marine Protected Areas in South Australian Marine Bioregions - Technical Report. Part 2 (PDF). Department for Environment and Heritage, South Australia.
- Baker, J.L (2004). Towards a System of Ecologically Representative Marine Protected Areas in South Australian Marine Bioregions - Technical Report. Part 3 (PDF). Department for Environment and Heritage, South Australia.
- Anon (2006). Island Parks of Western Eyre Peninsula Management Plan (PDF). Adelaide: Department for Environment and Heritage (DEH), South Australia. ISBN 1-921238-18-6.
- Investigator Marine Park Management Plan 2012 (PDF). Department for Environment Water and Natural Resources (DEWNR). 2012.
- Flinders, Matthew (1966) [1814]. A Voyage to Terra Australis : undertaken for the purpose of completing the discovery of that vast country, and prosecuted in the years 1801, 1802, and 1803 in His Majesty's ship the Investigator, and subsequently in the armed vessel Porpoise and Cumberland Schooner; with an account of the shipwreck of the Porpoise, arrival of the Cumberland at Mauritius, and imprisonment of the commander during six years and a half in that island (Facsimile ed.). Adelaide: Libraries Board of South Australia.
- A.C., Robinson; Canty, P.; Mooney, T.; Rudduck, P. (1996). South Australia's offshore islands (PDF). Canberra: Australian Heritage Commission. ISBN 0-644350-11-3.
- "Pearson Island Expedition 1969". Transactions of the Royal Society of South Australia. 95 (Part 3). Adelaide: Royal Society of South Australia (RSSA): 121–183. 15 October 1971.
- South Australia. Department of Marine and Harbors (DMH) (1985), The Waters of South Australia a series of charts, sailing notes and coastal photographs, Dept. of Marine and Harbors, South Australia, ISBN 978-0-7243-7603-2
- "Wilderness Advisory Committee Annual Report 2012-13 (WAC)" (PDF). Annual Report. Department for Environment Water and Natural Resources: 16–17. September 2013. ISSN 1832-9357.
