= Investigator Group (disambiguation) =

Investigator Group is an island group in South Australia.

Investigator Group may also refer to the following places in South Australia:

- Investigator Group Conservation Park, a former protected area
- Investigator Group Wilderness Protection Area, a protected area

== See also ==
- Investigator (disambiguation)
- Investigator Marine Park
