= Ward Islands (South Australia) =

Islands in South Australia

- Location within South Australia

Geography
- Location: Great Australian Bight
- Coordinates: 33°44′38″S 134°17′11″E
- Highest elevation: 49 m (161 ft)

Administration
- Australia

Demographics
- Population: 0

Ward Islands is an island group in the Australian state of South Australia located in the Investigator Group about 53 kilometres (33 miles) west by south of Cape Finniss on the west coast of Eyre Peninsula. The group was discovered and named by Matthew Flinders on 13 February 1802. The island group has enjoyed protected area status since the 1960s and since 2011, it been part of the Investigator Group Wilderness Protection Area.

== Description ==
Ward Islands is an island group located about 53 kilometres (33 miles) west by south of Cape Finniss on the west coast of Eyre Peninsula in South Australia, about 57 kilometres (35 miles) west by south of the town of Elliston and about 15 kilometres (8 nmi) west north-west of the south west point of Flinders Island.

The group consist of two islands: Ward Island (also known as the NE islet) and South Ward Island (also known as the SE Islet).

Ward Island covers an area of 20 hectares (49 acres). It rises above sea level with a coastline consisting of cliffs and scree slopes, all described as being ‘steep’, to a summit at 49 metres (161 feet) which has a relatively flat profile and ‘which carries a crust of soil and a few diminutive sand dunes’.

South Ward Island is described as ‘a hump of rock and soil’ which reaches a height of 28 metres (92 feet) above sea level and which is located about 2.5 kilometres (1.6 miles) to the south-east of Ward Island.

Access to Ward Island (and presumably to South Ward Island) is reported as being ‘complicated by the swell and the rocky coast’ to the extent that in one instance, ‘no safe boat landing sites could be found’. As a result, a survey carried out in 1980 used a helicopter to land survey personnel on Ward Island.

== Formation, geology and oceanography ==
The Ward Islands were formed about 9450 years ago following the rise of sea levels at the start of the Holocene.

Geologically, Ward Island is the remnant of a small hill with a volcanic plug core which had solidified to granite more than 1500 Ma ago and whose summit was buried under sand that consolidated to calcarenite, and that has been extensively eroded by wave action since the commencement of sea level rise.

The Ward Islands are part of a submerged reef system which includes a number of ‘sunken rocks, and three detached reefs, on which the sea generally breaks’ and which extends from Ward Island to the west of for about 4 kilometres (2.5 miles) and to the south for about 3 kilometres (1.9 miles). A depth of 50 metres (160 feet) is reached within 1.2 kilometres (0.75 miles) of the west of Ward Island.

== Flora and fauna ==
=== Flora ===
Terrestrial flora on the island group was found in 1980 to be represented by 12 species present as a ‘low, salt and wind-pruned heath’ and dominated by the following three species. Marsh saltbush is common on Ward Island in ‘deepest patches of the sandy loam soil’ followed by Nitre bush which favours ‘limey calcareous soils’ and pointed twinleaf which favours ‘the orange, decomposed sandstone soils’. South Ward Island is vegetated with marsh saltbush as are a number of large rocks which are permanently exposed above low water.

=== Fauna ===
Vertebrate animals observed on the island group include Australian sea lions and New Zealand fur seals and the following bird species: short tailed shearwater, white faced storm petrel, osprey, white-bellied sea-eagle, Richard's pipit, sooty oystercatcher, silver gull, Pacific gull and rock parrot.

== History ==
=== European discovery and use ===
Flinders discovered the island group on Saturday, 13 February 1802, and reportedly named it after his mother's maiden name. On the same day, Flinders also nominated it as one of the constituent parts of the Investigator Group.

== Protected areas status ==
The Ward Islands first received protected area status as part of a fauna reserve declared under the Fauna Conservation Act 1964 either on 1 September 1966 or 16 March 1967. The island group and other adjoining islands became part of the Investigator Group Conservation Park proclaimed under the National Parks and Wildlife Act 1972 in 1972. On 25 August 2011, it was one of the island groups excised from the Investigator Group Conservation Park and added to the Investigator Group Wilderness Protection Area. Since 2012, the waters adjoining the Ward Islands have been part of a habitat protection zone in the Investigator Marine Park.

== See also ==
- List of islands of Australia
- Investigator Islands Important Bird Area

== Citations and references ==
=== References ===
- South Australia. Department of Marine and Harbors (DMH) (1985), The Waters of South Australia a series of charts, sailing notes and coastal photographs, Dept. of Marine and Harbors, South Australia, ISBN 978-0-7243-7603-2
- Anon (2006). Island Parks of Western Eyre Peninsula Management Plan (PDF). Adelaide: Department for Environment and Heritage (DEH), South Australia. ISBN 1-921238-18-6.
- "Wilderness Advisory Committee Annual Report 2012-13 (WAC)" (PDF). Annual Report. Department for Environment Water and Natural Resources: 16–17. September 2013. ISSN 1832-9357.
- A.C., Robinson; Canty, P.; Mooney, T.; Rudduck, P. (1996). South Australia's offshore islands (PDF). Canberra: Australian Heritage Commission. ISBN 0-644350-11-3.
- Flinders, Matthew (1966) [1814]. A Voyage to Terra Australis : undertaken for the purpose of completing the discovery of that vast country, and prosecuted in the years 1801, 1802, and 1803 in His Majesty's ship the Investigator, and subsequently in the armed vessel Porpoise and Cumberland Schooner; with an account of the shipwreck of the Porpoise, arrival of the Cumberland at Mauritius, and imprisonment of the commander during six years and a half in that island (Facsimile ed.). Adelaide: Libraries Board of South Australia.
- Investigator Marine Park Management Plan 2012 (PDF). Adelaide: Department for Environment Water and Natural Resources (DEWNR). 2012.
