= Investigator =

Investigator may refer to:

== Occupations ==
=== Government and law ===
- Detective, a person who investigates crimes, can be a rank and job in a police department, state or federal employee, or a civilian called a private detective
- Inspector, a police rank in many countries

=== Science and academia ===
- Clinical investigator, an investigator involved in a clinical trial
- New investigator, a designation for less experienced researchers
- Principal investigator, a researcher in a research project
- the Investigator, a sloop, captained by Matthew Flinders, which made the first circumnavigation of the Australian coast.

=== Other fields ===
- Private investigator, a person who does not work for the police or government, but who undertakes investigations as a subcontractor
- Ghost hunter or other paranormal investigator
- Psychic detective, a person who investigates crimes by using purported psychic abilities
- In Mormon missionary terminology, an investigator refers to someone who is investigating the LDS Church. Generally, a non-member who is taking the missionary discussions.

== Media ==
- Investigator (magazine), journal of the Geelong Historical Society
- The Investigator, a 1954 Canadian radio play
- The Investigator (TV pilot), a 1973 British TV pilot
- The Investigator: A British Crime Story, a British television documentary
- InvestiGators, a graphic novel series by John Patrick Green

== Ships ==
- HMS Investigator, name of ships in the Royal Navy
- RV Investigator, Australian research vessel built in 2013

== Places ==
=== Australia ===
- Investigator Group, archipelago in South Australia
- Investigator Marine Park, a marine protected area in South Australia
- Investigator Strait, a strait in South Australia
- Investigator Islands, part of Recherche Archipelago in Western Australia.

== See also ==
- Investigation (disambiguation)
- Investigator Group (disambiguation)
- The Investigators (disambiguation)
