= Topgallant Islands =

Island group in South Australia

- Location within South Australia

Geography
- Location: Great Australian Bight
- Coordinates: 33°42′55″S 134°36′54″E

Administration
- Australia

Demographics
- Population: 0

Topgallant Islands is an island group in the Australian state of South Australia located in the Investigator Group about 22 kilometres (14 miles) south west of Cape Finniss on the west coast of Eyre Peninsula. The group was discovered and named by Matthew Flinders on 13 February 1802. The island group has enjoyed protected area status since the 1960s and since 2011, it has been part of the Investigator Group Wilderness Protection Area.

== Description ==
Topgallant Islands is an island group located about 22 kilometres (14 miles) south west of Cape Finniss on the west coast of Eyre Peninsula in South Australia, about 27 kilometres (17 miles) west by south of the town of Elliston and about 6.5 kilometres (3.5 nmi) east of Flinders Island.

The group consists of an islet and a number of bare rocks which are numbered at seven in one source and which extend from the islet in a line for a distance of about 1.9 kilometres (1 nmi) to the south east. The islet which has an area of about 20 hectares (49 acres), is encircled by 75 metres (246 feet) high cliffs and has a rounded top whose summit is at 101 metres (331 feet) above sea level. The southernmost rock is reported as being a "sharp pyramid" of 55 metres (180 feet) height.

The name used for the island group varies from the name given by Flinders (i.e. Topgallant Isles) as follows: Topgallant Islands, Top-gallant Islands, Top-Gallant Isles and Top Gallant Isles.

Access to Topgallant Island by boat is reported as not being possible due to a "combination of deep water swells, steep shores and sheer walls of rotten stone". A survey carried in 1980 used a helicopter to land personnel on the islet.

== Formation, geology and oceanography ==
The Topgallant Islands were formed about 8750 years ago following the rise of sea levels at the start of the Holocene.

Geologically, the constituent parts of the Topgallant Islands are the remnants of a stack of calcarenite strata sitting on a now-submerged ridge of granite which is now submerged and which has been extensively eroded by wave action since the commencement of sea level rise.

The Topgallant Islands are part of a submerged reef system orientated along a north north-west axis which extends from the islet in the west to the east of the southernmost rock for a distance of about 1.9 kilometres (1 nmi) with "sunken rocks" extending about 0.93 kilometres (0.5 nmi) to the south west of the islet. A depth of 30 metres (98 feet) is reached within 3 kilometres (1.9 miles) to the west.

== Flora and fauna ==
=== Flora ===
Vegetation is restricted generally to the summit of the islet where the soil is sufficiently deep to permit the growth of shrubs and two of the larger rocks. A survey conducted in 1980 found "four distinct plant communities" to present as "low shrublands" dominated by chenopods (in two instances), nitre bush and pointed twinleaf. Twenty species were recorded during the 1980 survey including the invasive species African boxthorn and common iceplant.

=== Fauna ===
Vertebrate animals observed on the island group include marbled geckos and the following bird species: Richard's pipit, white-faced heron, nankeen kestrel, white-bellied sea-eagle, welcome swallow, silver gull, rock parrot, white-faced storm petrel, short-tailed shearwater and common starling.

== History ==
=== European discovery and use ===
Flinders discovered the island group on Saturday, 13 February 1802, and named it due to it "resembling ships under sail". On the same day, Flinders also nominated it as one of the constituent parts of the Investigator Group.

== Protected areas status ==
The Topgallant Islands first received protected area status as part of a fauna reserve declared under the Fauna Conservation Act 1964 either on 1 September 1966 or 16 March 1967. The island group and other adjoining islands became part of the Investigator Group Conservation Park proclaimed under the National Parks and Wildlife Act 1972 in 1972. On 25 August 2011, it was one of the island groups excised from the Investigator Group Conservation Park to form the Investigator Group Wilderness Protection Area. Since 2012, the waters adjoining the Topgallant Islands have been part of a sanctuary zone in the Investigator Marine Park.

== See also ==
- List of islands of Australia
- Investigator Islands Important Bird Area

== Citations and references ==
=== References ===
- South Australia. Department of Marine and Harbors (DMH) (1985), The Waters of South Australia a series of charts, sailing notes and coastal photographs, Dept. of Marine and Harbors, South Australia, ISBN 978-0-7243-7603-2
- Anon (2006). Island Parks of Western Eyre Peninsula Management Plan (PDF). Adelaide: Department for Environment and Heritage (DEH), South Australia. ISBN 1-921238-18-6.
- "Wilderness Advisory Committee Annual Report 2012-13 (WAC)" (PDF). Annual Report. Department for Environment Water and Natural Resources: 16–17. September 2013. ISSN 1832-9357.
- A.C., Robinson; Canty, P.; Mooney, T.; Rudduck, P. (1996). South Australia's offshore islands (PDF). Canberra: Australian Heritage Commission. ISBN 0-644350-11-3.
- Flinders, Matthew (1966) [1814]. A Voyage to Terra Australis : undertaken for the purpose of completing the discovery of that vast country, and prosecuted in the years 1801, 1802, and 1803 in His Majesty's ship the Investigator, and subsequently in the armed vessel Porpoise and Cumberland Schooner; with an account of the shipwreck of the Porpoise, arrival of the Cumberland at Mauritius, and imprisonment of the commander during six years and a half in that island (Facsimile ed.). Adelaide: Libraries Board of South Australia.
- Investigator Marine Park Management Plan 2012 (PDF). Department for Environment Water and Natural Resources (DEWNR). 2012.
