= Investigator Group Conservation Park =

Protected area in South Australia

- IUCN category Ia (strict nature reserve)
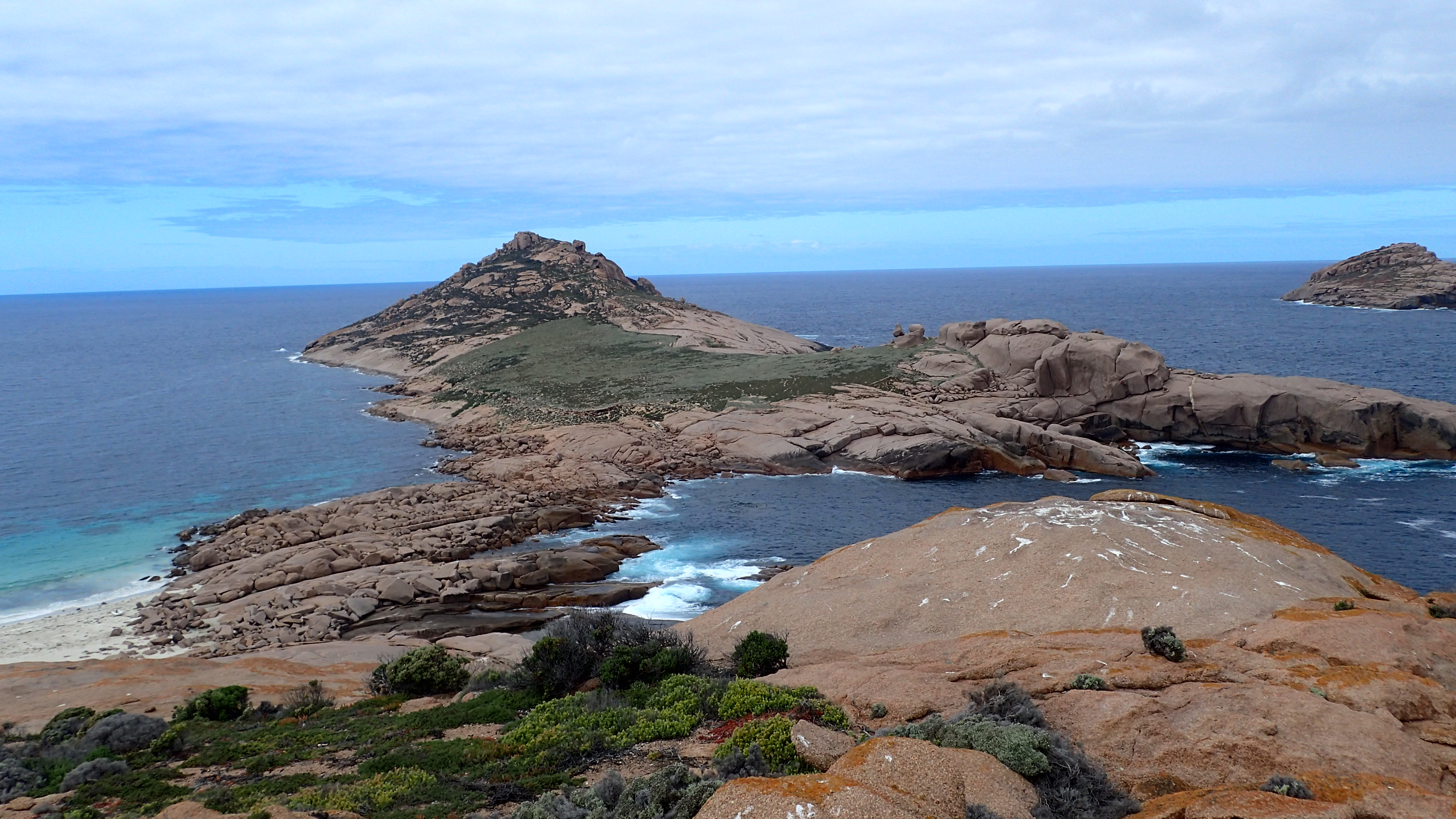
- Looking at the southern end of Pearson Island

- Location within South Australia
- Location: South Australia
- Nearest city: Elliston
- Coordinates: 33°57′14″S 134°16′06″E
- Area: 3.88 km^{2} (1.50 sq mi)
- Established: 16 March 1967
- Governing body: Department of Environment and Natural Resources (2011)

Investigator Group Conservation Park was a protected area in the Australian state of South Australia located on islands within the Investigator Group of islands off the west coast of Eyre Peninsula about 562 kilometres (349 mi) north-west of the state capital of Adelaide and about 50 kilometres (31 mi) south-west of the town of Elliston.

== Land tenure and designation ==
The conservation park consisted of land on the following islands within the Investigator Group: Dorothee Island, Pearson Island, the Topgallant Islands, the Veteran Isles and the Ward Islands. As of 2010, the conservation park covered an area of 3.88 square kilometres (1.50 sq mi). The conservation park was categorized in 2010 as being an IUCN Category Ia protected area.

== History ==
The land first received protected area status as fauna conservation reserves proclaimed on 16 March 1967 under the Crown Lands Act 1929 in respect to Topgallant Island, Ward Islands and Pearson Island with exception to land in sections 12 and 13 which were under the control of the Australian government.

On 27 April 1972, all of the land proclaimed as a fauna conservation reserve was reconstituted as the Investigator Group Conservation Park under the National Parks and Wildlife Act 1972.

In 1980, the conservation park was listed on the now-defunct Register of the National Estate.

On 19 December 1991, additional land was added to the conservation park to extend protection over land located between high tide and low tide.

On 29 August 2002, additional land was added to the conservation park.

On 25 August 2011, all of the land within the conservation park was constituted as part of the Investigator Group Wilderness Protection Area with the result that the conservation park ceased to exist.

== A description of the conservation park published in 1980 ==
On 21 October 1980, the conservation park was placed (i.e. "registered") on the Register of the National Estate. The following is the description and the statement of significance published at the time of placement.

=== Description ===
A group of approximately twelve oceanic islands and associated submerged rocks from 22km-74km from the coast. Includes the Waldegrave islands [sic], (Note: It is not known why the Waldegrave Islands are included in the Register of the National Estate listing for the Investigator Group Conservation Park because these islands, although described as being part of the Investigator Group, have a similar history of protection commencing as a fauna protection reserve in 1967 followed in 1972 with the re-proclamation of the protected land as the Waldegrave Islands Conservation Park which has its own listing on the Register of the National Estate.) Topgallant islands and Ward islands (but excludes Pearson [sic] (Note: The exclusion of Pearson Island is not correct as the management plan does specifically include this island.) and Flinders islands).

The islands are granite inselbergs up to 100m above sea level, and some are capped with calcarenite, a rock type of aeolian origin as windblown dunes. The islands feature precipitous cliffs to 75m tall, deep overhangs, sea caves, crevasses, talus slopes and summit platforms.

The larger islands have some soil development and mostly support low shrubland communities dominated by nitre bush (Nitraria billardierei), gallweed (Zygophyllum apiculatum), saltbush (Atriplex paludosa), grey saltbush (A. cinerea) and a daisy bush (Olearia ramulosa)…

The islands are largely undisturbed because of the difficulty of access from the sea; Topgallant island contains some infestations of African boxthorn and common ice plant…

=== Statement of Significance ===
The registered islands in this group, namely Waldegrave Islands [sic], (Note: Refer footnote 1 above.) Topgallant Islands, Ward Islands and Pearson Islands, are true inselbergs or island mountains, rising abruptly to a maximum of 240m above sea level from the eastern section of the Great Australian Bight. Other important landforms within the Group are of marine origin, including old coastal foredune deposits and formations indicating a higher sea level than presently exists…

The islands of the Group are some of the most scenically spectacular of all South Australia's offshore islands. Many birds utilise the Investigator Group islands, which may be significant as intermediate points for birds migrating from Flinders Island to the Australian mainland, or as extended feeding territories for Flinders Island species…

Several rare or threatened bird taxa, or species with disjunct populations, utilise the islands for breeding, including osprey (Pandion haliaetus), white-breasted sea-eagle (Haliaeetus leucogaster), cape barren goose (Cereopsis novaehollandiae), white faced storm-petrel (Pelagodroma marina) and short-tailed shearwater (Puffinus tenuirostris)…

A small colony of Australian sea-lions (Neophoca cinerea), one of the world's rarest marine mammals, breeds on Ward Island…

Groups of the New Zealand fur seal (Arctocephalus forsteri) shelter on the rock platforms of several islands and may breed on them…

== See also ==
- Protected areas of South Australia

== Notes and references ==
=== Attribution ===
- This article incorporates text by Commonwealth of Australia available under the CC BY 3.0 AU licence.
