= The Investigators =

The Investigators may refer to:

== Television shows ==
- The Investigators (1961 TV series), a 1961 American dramatic television series broadcast on CBS
- The Investigators, a 1984 HBO TV series starring Charles Rocket
- The Investigators (Australian TV series), a 1985–1995 Australian consumer affairs programme
- The Investigators (British TV series), a 1999 British children's television programme broadcast on Channel 4
- The Investigators (Irish TV series), a 2007–2008 Irish science programme broadcast on RTÉ One
- The Investigators, a 2000–2009 Court TV series

== Other ==
- Investigator
- The Investigators, a Lovers rock group from London
- The Investigators, children's book series by John Patrick Green
