= Waldegrave Islands =

Islands in South Australia

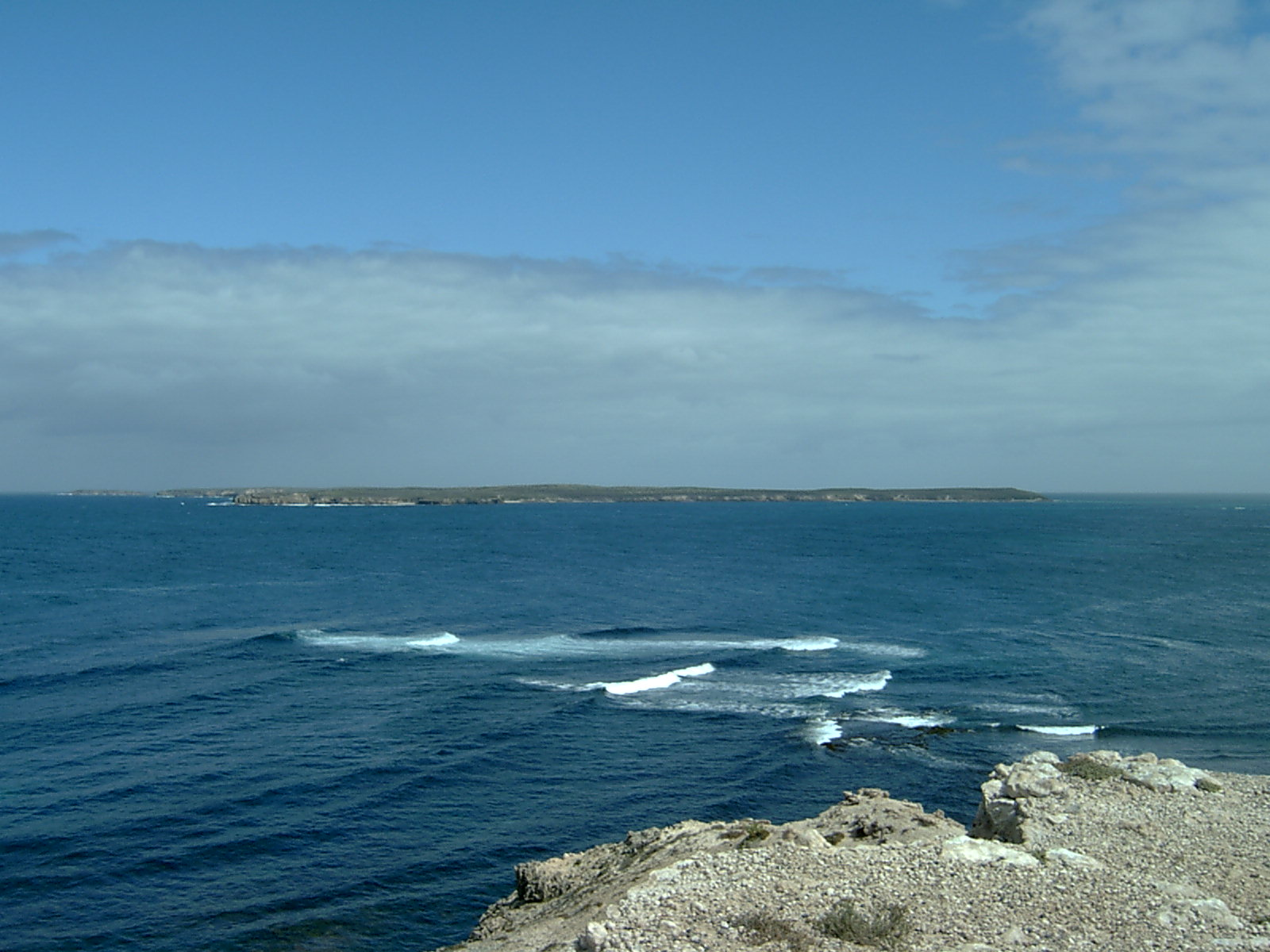
- Waldegrave Islands as viewed from the nearby coastline

- Location within South Australia

Geography
- Location: Great Australian Bight
- Coordinates: 33°35′46″S 134°46′46″E

Administration
- Australia

Demographics
- Population: 0

Waldegrave Islands is an island group in the Australian state of South Australia located in the Investigator Group about 2.5 kilometres (1.6 miles) northwest by west of Cape Finniss on the west coast of Eyre Peninsula. The group consists of Waldegrave Island, Little Waldegrave Island and according to some sources, a pair of rocks known as the Watchers. The group is notable as a breeding site for Australian sea lions and Cape Barren geese. The group has enjoyed protected area status since the 1960s and as of 1972 has been part of the Waldegrave Islands Conservation Park.

== Description ==
Waldegrave Islands is an island group located about 2.5 kilometres (1.6 miles) northwest by west of Cape Finniss and about 8.5 kilometres (5.3 miles) northwest by west of the town of Elliston on the west coast of Eyre Peninsula in South Australia.

The group consist of the following islands: Waldegrave Island (also called East Waldegrave Island and East Island in some sources), Little Waldegrave Island (also called West Waldegrave Island, West Island and Seal Island in some sources) and according to some sources, a pair of rocks known as the Watchers.

Both islands can be accessed via the rocky coast on their northern sides which is sheltered from southerly swells.

=== Waldegrave Island ===
Waldegrave Island is a flat topped island with steep sides having a length of about 3.5 kilometres (2.2 miles) (in the east-west direction), a maximum height in the range of 37–39 metres (121–128 feet) and an area of 292 hectares (720 acres). Its east coast which is about 1.5 kilometres (0.93 miles) long is terminated at the north east with a point named McLachlan Point and the south by a point named Point Watson. It overlaps the seaward boundary of Anxious Bay as proclaimed by the Australian government in 1987 and again in 2006 under the Seas and Submerged Lands Act 1973.

=== Little Waldegrave Island ===
Little Waldegrave Island is located about 1 kilometre (0.62 miles) west of Waldegrave Island. It is a flat topped island with steep sides having a length of about 1 kilometre (0.62 miles) (in the east-west direction), a maximum height in the range of 25 metres (82 feet) and an area of 32 hectares (79 acres).

=== The Watchers ===
The Watchers are a pair of rocks that are spaced about 1.9 kilometres (1 nmi) apart and which are located about 3.1 kilometres (1.7 nmi) west of Little Waldegrave Island. The western rock has a charted height of 7 metres (23 feet) and is reported in another source as being 7.3 metres (24 feet). The eastern rock is charted as an intertidal reef.

== Formation, geology and oceanography ==
The Waldegrave Islands were formed about 6000 years ago following the rise of sea levels at the start of the Holocene. The Waldegrave Islands consist of a "crystalline basement (covered by calcareous aeolianite of varying thickness)" which outcrops to a height of 5 metres (16 feet) on Little Waldegrave Island and which exists as a submerged reef connecting both islands. The Waldegrave Islands are considered to be "remnants of a once more prominent Cape Finnis(s)" with the "remains of the bridging isthmus lie as a submerged reef connecting Cape Finnis(s)" to Waldegrave Island at its north-eastern tip.

The Watchers are reported geologically as being "two isolated outcrops of crystalline rocks".

Waters around Waldegrave and Little Waldegrave Islands drop to depths of 15–20 metres (49–66 feet) within about 300–1,000 metres (980–3,280 feet) of its north, west and south coasts. Its east coast drops into water of depths between 5–10 metres (16–33 feet) due to the presence of the submerged reef structure between it and Cape Finniss.

The Watchers are associated with a submerged reef system independent of that underlying the Waldegrave and Little Waldegrave Islands. Waters adjoining the Watchers drop to depths of 15 metres (49 feet) within about 300 metres (980 feet) immediately south and west of the western rock and about 600 metres (2,000 feet) to its north east.

== Flora and fauna ==
=== Flora ===
A survey carried out during 1979 on Waldegrave Island found 26 species of plant that occurred in the following "five distinctive groupings": introduced pasture, "heavy infestations of African Boxthorn" and native shrublands of native juniper and coast daisy-bush and saltbush. A survey carried out in 1980 on Little Waldegrave Island found southern seaheath, sea celery and nine other species of plant including "colonising weeds such as African boxthorn and common iceplant".

=== Fauna ===
A Survey carried out during 1979 on Waldegrave Island found the following species of birds: short-tailed shearwater, Cape Barren geese, masked plover, galah, white-fronted chat, little grassbird, nankeen kestrel, black-faced shag, sooty oystercatcher, white-bellied sea eagle, various gulls and terns, and barn owl which prey on the population of bush rat. A survey carried out in 1980 on Little Waldegrave Island found a population of Australian sea lions and five species of birds including rock parrot, Cape Barren geese and little penguin. Surveys carried out on Little Waldegrave Island between February 2001 and May 2006 confirm the presence of the following bird species: white-faced heron, eastern reef egret, white-bellied sea eagle, swamp harrier, peregrine falcon, nankeen kestrel, common greenshank, ruddy turnstone, red-necked stint, masked lapwing, rock parrot, sacred kingfisher, white-fronted chat, Australian raven, Richard's pipit, welcome swallow, silvereye and common starling.

==== Australian sea lion ====
Little Waldegrave Island is the site of a breeding colony of Australian sea lion. As of 1999, the population was reported as being 38. On the larger island, Flinders' expedition killed "a few" Australian sea lions.

==== Cape Barren geese ====
As of 1996, the Waldegrave Islands were considered to be the "second most important breeding area" for Cape Barren geese in South Australia and as having a breeding population of 20 pairs. As of 1999, 350 geese had been recorded feeding at nearby Lake Newland, and the birds breeding on Waldegrave Island were reported as staying "in the Elliston area for the summer, feeding in swamps around the margins of Lake Newland and on grain in wheat paddocks".

==== Little penguin ====
The Waldegrave Islands have been reported as the site of a little penguin breeding colony. As of 1999, breeding colonies were described as common on Little Waldegrave Island, and 300 pairs had been recorded on Waldegrave Island. A 2011 review put the Waldegrave Island population at more than 500 (a 2006 estimate) and noted 600 in a small surveyed area, with the trend possibly stable.

== History ==
=== European discovery and use ===
Matthew Flinders named the island group after William Waldegrave, 1st Baron Radstock on Wednesday, 10 February 1802.

The Waldegrave Islands is one of the island sites from which guano was mined under licence from the South Australian Government prior to 1919.

Prior to 1967, Waldegrave Island was used for grazing.

== Protected areas status ==
The Waldegrave Islands first received protected area status as a fauna conservation reserve declared on 16 March 1967. The Waldegrave Islands along with the Watchers were proclaimed as a conservation park under the National Parks and Wildlife Act 1972 in 1972.

== See also ==
- List of islands of Australia
- List of little penguin colonies
- Investigator Islands Important Bird Area

== Citations and references ==
=== References ===
- South Australia. Department of Marine and Harbors (DMH) (1985), The Waters of South Australia a series of charts, sailing notes and coastal photographs, Dept. of Marine and Harbors, South Australia, ISBN 978-0-7243-7603-2
- Royal Australian Navy (RAN) Hydrographic Service Hydrographic Department (1979). Streaky Bay to Whidbey Islands (chart no. Aus 342).
- Anon (2006). Island Parks of Western Eyre Peninsula Management Plan (PDF). Adelaide: Department for Environment and Heritage (DEH), South Australia. ISBN 1-921238-18-6. Archived from the original (PDF) on 24 September 2015.
- Shaughnessy, Peter; Dennis, Terry; Armstrong, Dave; Berris, Steve (2008). "Land-birds of three islands off the west coast of Eyre Peninsula, South Australia: Lilliput, Nicolas Baudin and West Waldegrave". Corella. 32 (1): 17–19.
- Robinson, A. C.; Canty, P.; Mooney, T.; Rudduck, P. (1996). South Australia's offshore islands (PDF). Canberra: Australian Heritage Commission. ISBN 0-644350-11-3. Archived from the original (PDF) on 17 April 2021.
- Flinders, Matthew (1966) [1814]. A Voyage to Terra Australis : undertaken for the purpose of completing the discovery of that vast country, and prosecuted in the years 1801, 1802, and 1803 in His Majesty's ship the Investigator, and subsequently in the armed vessel Porpoise and Cumberland Schooner; with an account of the shipwreck of the Porpoise, arrival of the Cumberland at Mauritius, and imprisonment of the commander during six years and a half in that island (Facsimile ed.). Adelaide: Libraries Board of South Australia.
- Edyvane, K. S (1999), Conserving marine biodiversity in South Australia, part 2 : identification of areas of high conservation value in South Australia (PDF), South Australian Research & Development Institute, ISBN 978-0-7308-5249-0, archived from the original (PDF) on 27 March 2012
- Wiebkin, Annelise (2011), Conservation management priorities for little penguin populations in Gulf St Vincent. Report to Adelaide and Mount Lofty Ranges Natural Resources Management Board SARDI Publication No. F2011/000188-1. SARDI Research Report Series No.588 (PDF), South Australian Research and Development Institute (Aquatic Sciences), archived from the original (PDF) on 24 September 2015
- Goldsworthy, Simon D.; Lowther, Andrew D.; Shaughnessy, Peter D. (October 2013), Maintaining the monitoring of pup production at key Australian sea lion colonies in South Australia (2011/12): final report to the Australian Marine Mammal Centre (PDF), West Beach, SA: SARDI Aquatic Sciences, archived from the original (PDF) on 6 January 2015
- "Explanatory Statement Issued by the authority of the Attorney-General, Seas and Submerged Lands Act 1973, Seas and Submerged Lands (Historic Bays) Proclamation 2006". Commonwealth of Australia (CoA).
