= Atriplex paludosa subsp. baudinii =

Scientific classification
- Kingdom: Plantae
- Clade: Tracheophytes
- Clade: Angiosperms
- Clade: Eudicots
- Order: Caryophyllales
- Family: Amaranthaceae
- Genus: Atriplex
- Species: A. paludosa
- Subspecies: A. p. subsp. baudinii

Trinomial name
- Atriplex paludosa subsp. baudinii (Moq.) Aellen

Subspecies of flowering plant

Atriplex paludosa subsp. baudinii is subspecies of Atriplex paludosa (marsh saltbush) that is endemic to Western Australia.

== Description ==
It grows as an erect shrub up to a metre high. Leaves are oval in shape, one to four centimetres long, 2 to 15 millimetres wide, and scaly all over.

== Taxonomy ==
It was first published as Atriplex paludosa var. Baudini by Alfred Moquin-Tandon in 1849, based on specimens collected by during the Baudin expedition. The orthography of Baudini was later altered to baudinii. At the same time, Moquin-Tandon published Atriplex drummondii, based on specimens collected by James Drummond, but the latter name is now considered a taxonomic synonym of the former. In 1938, Paul Aellen promoted the variety to subspecies rank. At the same time, the inexplicably published Atriplex paludosa var. typica for this taxon, a name that is invalid, illegal and superfluous.

== Distribution and habitat ==
It occurs almost exclusively within the Southwest Botanical Province of Western Australia.
