= Investigator Group Wilderness Protection Area =

Protected area in South Australia

- IUCN category Ib (wilderness area)
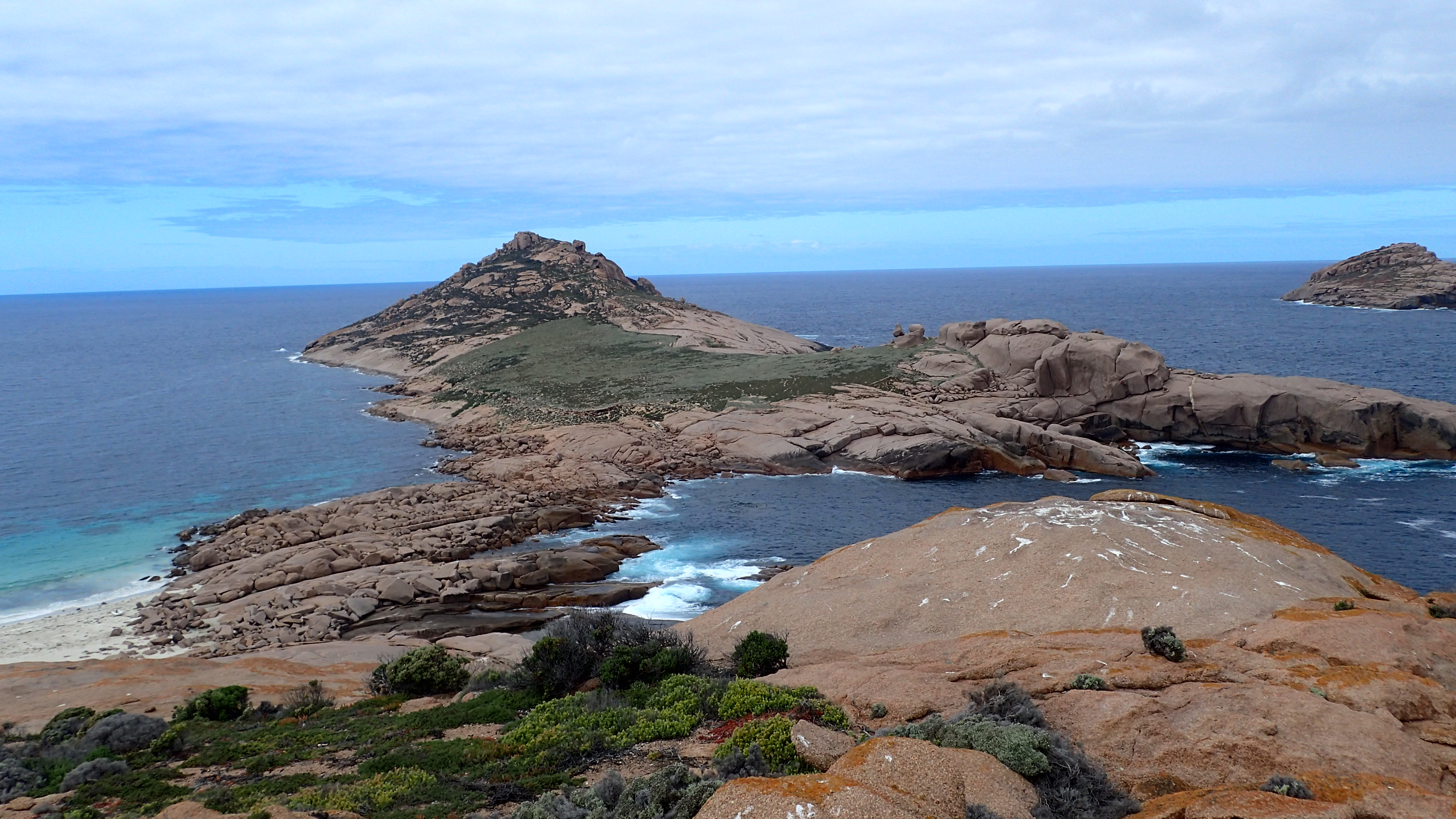
- View of the southern end of Pearson Island

- Location within South Australia
- Location: South Australia
- Nearest city: Elliston
- Coordinates: 33°55′58.74″S 134°17′2.27″E
- Area: 4.4 km^{2} (1.7 sq mi)
- Established: 25 August 2011
- Governing body: Department for Environment and Water

Investigator Group Wilderness Protection Area is a protected area in South Australia, located in the Investigator Group of islands off the west coast of Eyre Peninsula, between 25 kilometres (16 miles) and 70 kilometres (43 miles) south-west of Elliston.

It was proclaimed in August 2011 under the Wilderness Protection Act 1992 to protect "important haul-out areas for the Australian sea lion and New Zealand fur seal" and habitat for species such as white-faced storm petrels, Cape Barren geese, mutton birds and the Pearson Island black-footed rock-wallaby. The wilderness protection area was created from land excised from the Investigator Group Conservation Park. It consists of the Ward Islands, the Top Gallant Isles, and the Pearson Isles, which consist of Dorothee Island, Pearson Island and Veteran Isles with the exception of a portion of land on Pearson Island held by the Australian Maritime Safety Authority for "lighthouse purposes".

Since 2012, the waters adjoining the islands located in the wilderness protected area have been part of the Investigator Marine Park.

The wilderness protected area is classified as an IUCN Category Ib protected area.
