= Investigator (magazine) =

- Categories: History magazines
- Frequency: Quarterly
- First issue: September 1965
- Company: Geelong Historical Society
- Country: Australia
- Based in: Victoria
- Website: Investigator
- ISSN: 0021-0013

The Investigator (ISSN 0021-0013) is a quarterly magazine published by the Geelong Historical Society in March, June, September and December each year. The journal is named for the ship HMS Investigator of explorer Matthew Flinders, who was the first to set inside Port Phillip Bay and see the site of the future town of Geelong.

There is a cumulative index for 1965–1984 and an updated digitised index on CD from 1965 up to 2009. Issued from Vol. 1 no. 1: (Sep 1965) to date. The Investigator includes articles on general history of Geelong and District, but also specialist research and history from a number of expert contributors including Norm Houghton an authority on timber tramways and sawmills of the district, and former engineer, the late Peter F. B. Alsop.
