= Waldegrave Islands Conservation Park =

Protected area in South Australia

- IUCN category Ia (strict nature reserve)
- Location within South Australia
- Location: South Australia
- Nearest city: Elliston
- Coordinates: 33°35′38″S 133°45′34″E
- Area: 3.94 km^{2} (1.52 sq mi)
- Established: 16 March 1967
- Governing body: Department for Environment and Water

Waldegrave Islands Conservation Park is a protected area located on the following islands within the Investigator Group in South Australia: the Waldegrave Island, Little Waldegrave Island and the Watchers (collectively known as the Waldegrave Islands in some sources).

The conservation park is located off the west coast of Eyre Peninsula about 8.5 kilometres (5.3 miles) north-west of Elliston. The land under protection was first declared in 1967 as fauna conservation reserve under the Crown Lands Act 1929-1966, and was re-proclaimed in 1972 under the National Parks and Wildlife Act 1972 to "conserve Cape Barren geese (Cereopsis novaehollandiae) breeding habitat and Australian sea lion haul-out areas".

In 1980, the conservation park was described as follows:

As two uninhabited offshore islands, this reserve is largely free of human interference and as such is an important breeding ground for such uncommon bird species as cape barren geese and white-breasted sea-eagles. Also present are ospreys, mutton birds, black tiger snakes and Rattus fuscipes…

Two offshore islands covered with a largely introduced flora of sage brush and boxthorn over a grass understorey. Only the coastal fringes retain a predominantly native vegetation of nitrebush and saltbush…

Though exhibiting a predominantly introduced flora, the Island is uninhabited and free of introduced terrestrial predators.

The conservation park is classified as an International Union for Conservation of Nature Category Ia protected area. In 1980, it was listed on the now-defunct Register of the National Estate.
