= The Investigators (Irish TV series) =

- Genre: Documentary
- Country of origin: Ireland
- Original language: English
- No. of seasons: 2
- No. of episodes: 13

Production
- Running time: 30 minutes

Original release
- Network: RTÉ Two
- Release: 8 November 2007 – present

The Investigators is an Irish scientific television series broadcast on RTÉ One. The series examines some of the most interesting projects being worked on by leading Irish scientists across the globe and assesses what potential impact they may have in the future. The selection of projects is diverse, ranging from the identification of a protein which may help to arrest and even reverse the onset of Alzheimer's disease to the design of a camera which can capture an extraterrestrial event that happened billions of years ago. Each programme focuses on a specific area of life such as Ireland in Space, Ageing, Sensors, Climate Change, Crops of the Future and the Nano Revolution. The series airs each Thursday at 23:05.

== Synopsis ==
=== Series one ===
Series one was broadcast on RTÉ in seven parts from 8 November 2007.

	Summary	Broadcast date	Ref
"Cancer"		8 November 2007	
"Climate Change"		15 November 2007	
"The Brain"		22 November 2007	
"MAL"		29 November 2007	
"Wave Energy"		6 December 2007	
"Functional Food"		13 December 2007	
"Genetics"		20 December 2007	

=== Series two ===
Series two began broadcasting on 6 November 2008. It featured researchers from UCD in five of its episodes.

	Summary	Broadcast date	Ref
"Sensors and the World of Artificial Intelligence"	Irish scientists marry the technologies of nanoscience, sensors and the computing power of the internet.	6 November 2008	
"Crops of the Future"	Research has opened up new horizons for crop growers in areas such as human health, from "superbreads" to plants that could help in the production of a HIV/Aids vaccine.	13 November 2008	
"Climate Change"	The important work on mathematical models of our future climate. These are run on powerful computers operated by the UCD Meteorology and Climate Centre and the Irish Centre for High-End Computing.	20 November 2008	
"Ireland in Space"	Irish researchers are working on new materials for use in the European Space Agency's 2013 mission to Mercury, a device to measure radiation on satellites and a camera that can picture an event in space which happened billions of years ago.	27 November 2008	
"Aging"	Research is being carried out at UCD, Beaumont Hospital, Dublin and Remedi, Galway into the earlier diagnosis and possible prevention of related diseases. It includes research to identify a protein which may help to arrest and even reverse the onset of Alzheimer's disease.	4 December 2008	
"The Nano Revolution"	Interviews with several pioneers in this area - Professor Mike Coey from TCD, UCD's Professor Ken Dawson and DIT's Dr Suresh Pillai, who has designed a nanoparticle which can be activated by fluorescent lighting designed to kill the MRSA hospital bug.	11 December 2008	
