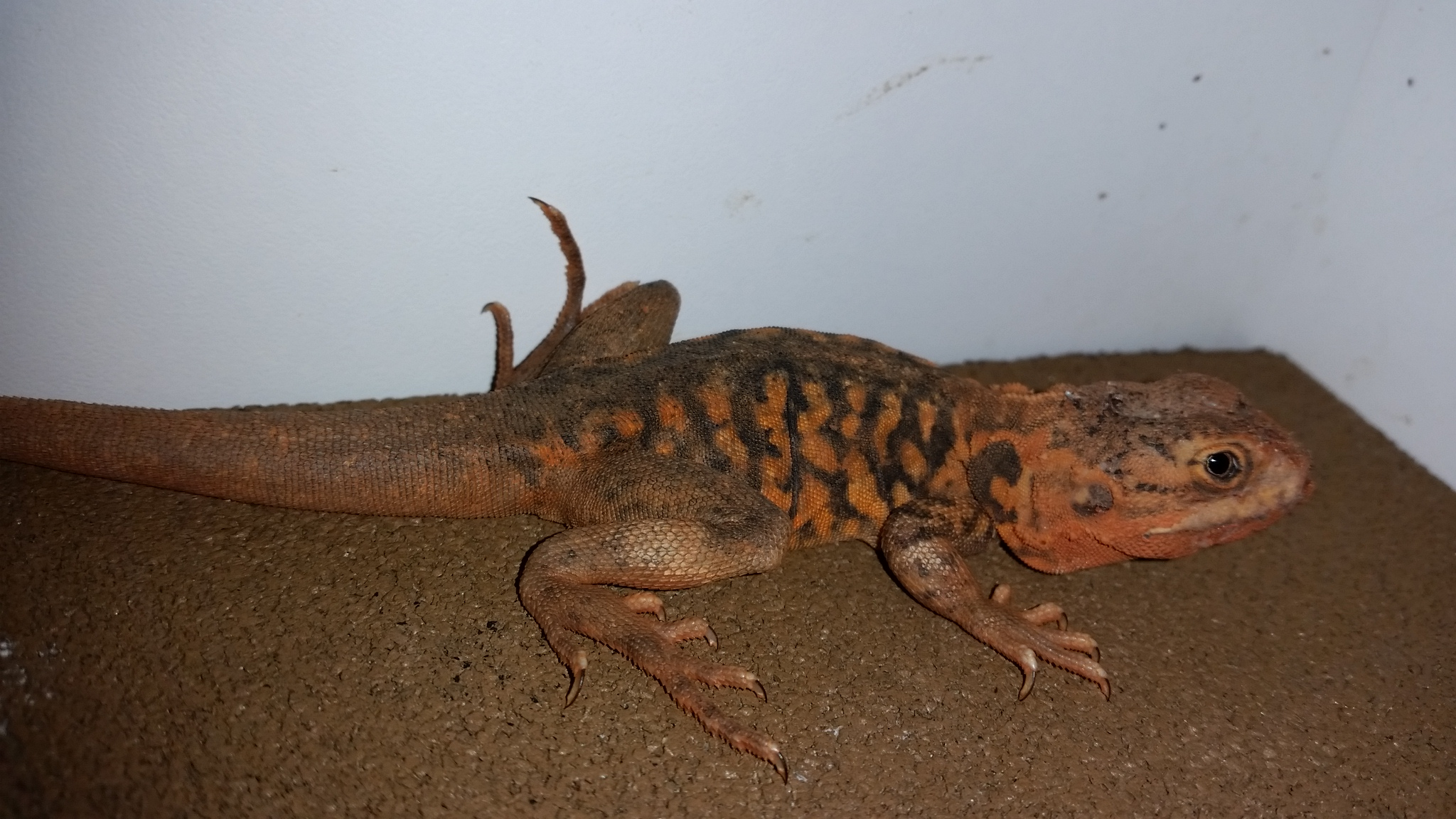
- A peninsula dragon in captivity

Conservation status
- Least Concern (IUCN 3.1)

Scientific classification
- Kingdom: Animalia
- Phylum: Chordata
- Class: Reptilia
- Order: Squamata
- Suborder: Iguania
- Family: Agamidae
- Genus: Ctenophorus
- Species: C. fionni

Binomial name
- Ctenophorus fionni (Procter, 1923)

Synonyms
- Amphibolurus fionni Procter, 1923; Ctenophorus fionni — Cogger, 2000

= Ctenophorus fionni =

Species of lizard

Ctenophorus fionni, also known commonly as the Arcoona rock dragon, the peninsula crevice-dragon and the peninsula dragon, is a species of lizard in the family Agamidae. The species is endemic to the Australian state of South Australia.

== Etymology ==
The specific name, fionni, is in honor of someone called "Fionn", the identity of whom Procter never revealed.

== Description ==
Adults of C. fionni have a total length (including tail) of 10 to 12 cm (3.9 to 4.7 in). Females range in colour from brown to reddish-brown, with dark mottling. Males tend to have grey backs, brown heads and a multitude of white, cream and yellow-orange spots. The patterns and colours of males can vary drastically between different geographically isolated populations, with each isolated population having its own unique colour/pattern combination.

== Distribution ==
The entire geographic range of C. fionni is in South Australia and includes the Eyre Peninsula, the adjacent interior areas (including the Gawler Ranges), and many offshore islands.

== Ecology and behaviour ==
C. fionni occurs in the rocky ranges and outcrops. It is diurnal, seeking shelter in narrow rock crevices and perching on prominent protruding rocks. Males often perform displays involving push-ups, tail-coiling, and head-bobbing.

== Reproduction ==
The breeding season of C. fionni starts at around spring, when the weather is beginning to warm up. Males in this time of year become very active, showing dominance and fighting for females. Females are known to lay up to 6 eggs, typically during spring and summer depending on the location and conditions.

== Diet ==
The peninsula dragon feeds on invertebrates.

== Threats ==
There are no known major threats to C. fionni; albeit present in the national pet trade, this is not taking place at levels that would constitute a threat.
