= Investigator Group =

Archipelago of Eyre Peninsula, South Australia

- Location within South Australia

Geography
- Location: Great Australian Bight
- Coordinates: 33°45′S 134°30′E

Administration
- Australia

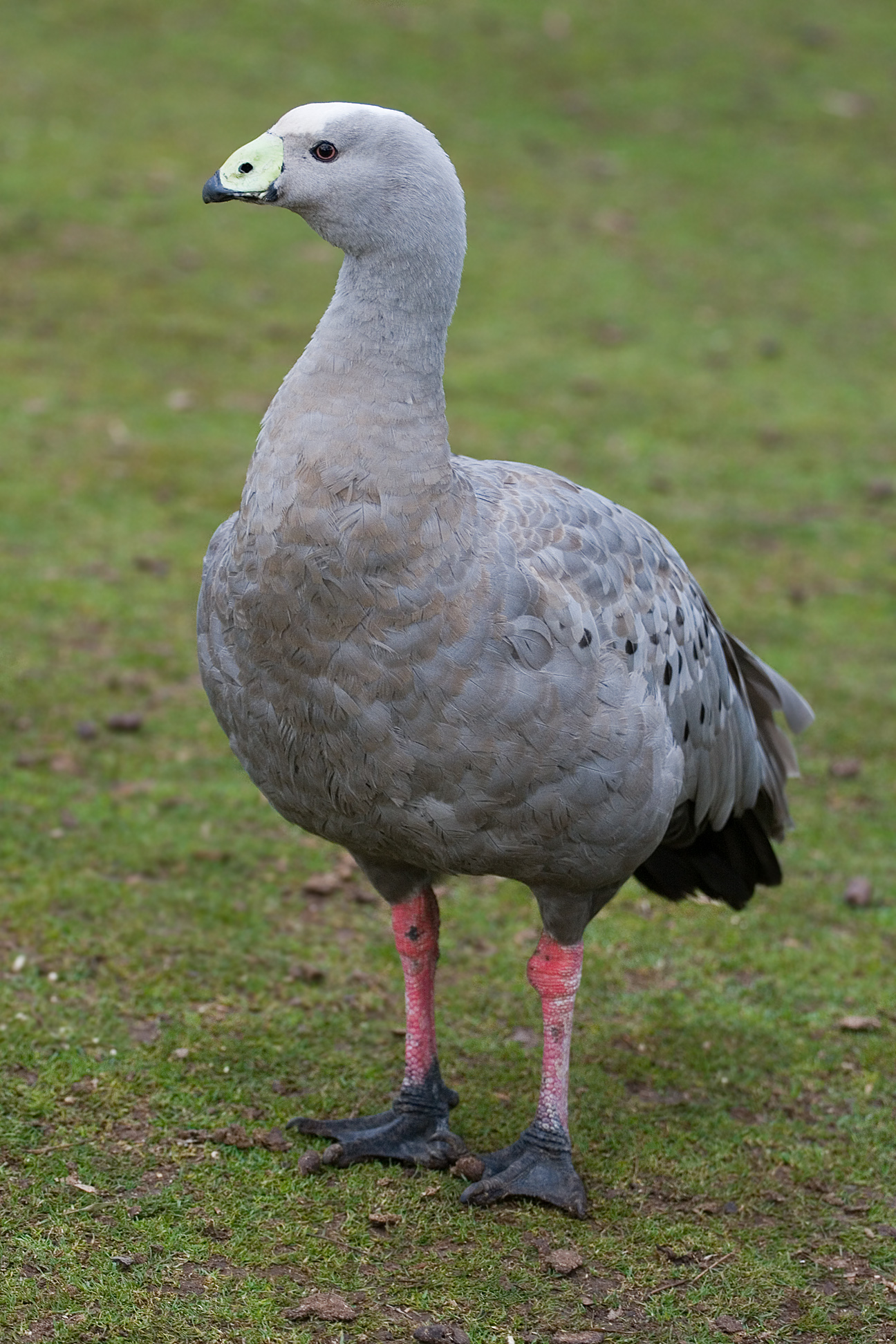
The islands are an important area for Cape Barren geese

The Investigator Group is an archipelago in South Australia that consists of Flinders Island and five island groups located off the western coast of the Eyre Peninsula. It is named after HMS Investigator by her commander, Matthew Flinders when he explored the area in 1802. The Group lies within the Great Australian Bight. All the islands except Flinders Island, and a part of Pearson Island, are within the Investigator Group Wilderness Protection Area and the Waldegrave Islands Conservation Park.

== Description ==
=== Generally ===
The Investigator Group is a group of islands and associated landforms that are located within an area extending for a distance of about 70 kilometres (38 nmi) south west from Cape Finniss on the west coast of Eyre Peninsula in South Australia. The group consists of the following islands and island groups placed in order of increasing distance from Cape Finniss: the Waldegrave Islands, The Watchers, Flinders Island, Topgallant Islands, the Ward Islands and the Pearson Isles.

=== Waldgrave Islands ===
The northernmost group lies 3 km offshore near the small town of Elliston. It consists of Waldegrave (292 ha) and Little Waldegrave (32 ha) Islands. They have calcarenite soils and were grazed by sheep until 1967. The vegetation is mainly regenerating pasture, with patches of native shrubland dominated by native juniper and coast daisy-bush.

=== The Watchers ===
The Watchers are a pair of rocks that are spaced about 1.9 kilometres (1 nmi) apart and which are located about 3.1 kilometres (1.7 nmi) west of Little Waldegrave Island. The western rock has a charted height of 7 metres (23 feet) and is reported in another source as being 7.3 metres (24 feet). The eastern rock is charted as an intertidal reef.

=== Flinders Island ===
Flinders Island, which is 28 km offshore and at 36 km^{2} is the largest island in the Investigator Group. Flinders Island is leasehold land used for grazing. It has sandy, calcarenite soils, is mainly vegetated with pasture grasses, and has some remnant patches of heathland and Melaleuca woodland.

=== Topgallant Islands ===
Topgallant Islands are located 6 km to the east of Flinders Islands and is a small island with steep cliffs and some stunted shrubland.

=== Ward Islands ===
Ward Islands are located 16 km to the west of Flinders Island and is covered with shrubland and heathland.

=== Pearson Isles ===
The southernmost group consists of Pearson Island (213 ha), the Veteran Isles (14 ha) and Dorothee Island (56 ha). Pearson Island, the second largest of the whole Investigator Group, and containing its highest point at 231 m above sea level, is vegetated with shrub and heathland with patches of Casuarina and Melaleuca woodland. The Veteran Isles support low shrubland dominated by twiggy daisy-bush and marsh saltbush. Lying 3 km south-south-west of the Veteran Isles is Dorothee Island, the most southerly of the Investigator Group.

== History ==
=== European discovery ===
On Saturday, 13 February 1802, Flinders gave the name Investigator Group to the group of islands consisting of Flinders Island, the Pearson Islands, the Topgallant Islands, the Waldegrave Islands and Ward Islands.

== Protected area status and other designations ==
=== Reserves declared by the South Australian government ===
Protected area status has been conferred to all islands within the group with exception of the majority of Flinders Island and part of Pearson Island. The Investigator Group Wilderness Protection Area comprises Ward Islands, Top Gallant Isles, Pearson Isles with exception of a portion of land on Pearson Island which is held by the Australian Maritime Safety Authority for "lighthouse purposes". The Waldegrave Islands Conservation Park occupies the Waldegrave Island, Little Waldegrave Island and the Watchers. A heritage agreement has been in force on Flinders Island since 1995 in respect to a strip of land along the north coast of the island extending west from the island’s most northerly headland, Point Malcolm. As of 2012, the Investigator Marine Park includes the waters adjoining Flinders Island, Topgallant Isles, the Ward Islands and the Pearson Isles.

=== Non-statutory arrangements ===
==== Investigator Islands Important Bird Area ====
The group was identified by BirdLife International as an Important Bird Area (IBA) known as the Investigator Islands (sic) Important Bird Area in 2009, because of its population of the vulnerable species, the fairy tern, as well as significant populations of Cape Barren geese, Pacific gull and black-faced cormorant. Other birds for which the IBA is significant include large numbers of breeding short-tailed shearwaters and white-faced storm-petrels. The biome-restricted rock parrot has been recorded from most islands in the group. The islands met the IBA criteria in 2009.

== See also ==
- List of archipelagos
