= Flinders Island (South Australia) =

Island off the western coast of the Eyre Peninsula, South Australia

- Location within South Australia

Geography
- Location: Great Australian Bight
- Coordinates: 33°42′49″S 134°29′49″E
- Area: 3,642 ha (9,000 acres)
- Highest elevation: 66 m (217 ft)

Administration
- Australia

Flinders Island is an island in the Investigator Group off the coast of South Australia approximately 32 kilometres (20 mi) west of mainland town Elliston. It was named by Matthew Flinders after his younger brother Samuel Flinders, the second lieutenant on HMS Investigator in 1802.

It is part of the Investigator Islands Important Bird Area and has a colony of little penguins, but has suffered from the feral cats, black rats and mice, which threaten the bird life. The island is privately owned and was used mostly for farming since 1911, although that tailed off as transport costs rose. In 2020 the owners signed an agreement with the Government of South Australia which places a conservation agreement over 3,400 hectares (8,400 acres), which is most of the island.

The island has been subject to diamond exploration following the discovery of a wide range of kimberlite indicator minerals there, which was continuing as of 2019.

== History ==
=== European discovery and use ===
Flinders named the island after his younger brother Samuel, who was the sloop's second lieutenant, on 13 February 1802. Flinders' expedition described some aspects of the island's flora and fauna. Lower land was covered with large bushes, unlike islands previously passed further north. There was very little of the white, velvety grass striplex or tufted wiry grass previously seen. A small macropod species was described as "numerous" and specimens were shot. There were a few small casuarinas growing on the island but firewood was scarce. The beaches were frequented by Australian sea lions, of which several family groups were closely inspected.

A sealing camp was in place on the south-east side of the island by the 1820s. There was also a whaling station. The sealers, their Aboriginal wives and children numbered up to twenty people at one stage. A pastoral survey of the site in 1890 identified ten separate structures associated with the sealing community, and archaeological examination of the structures took place in the 1980s. The Flinders Island Whaling and Sealing Site is listed on the South Australian Heritage Register.

Some time prior to 1911, sheep, horses, cattle, milk thistles and oats were introduced to Flinders Island, presumably by Willie Schlink and his family. At this time 1,500 acres (610 ha) of the island had been cleared and was producing 1,400 to 2,000 bags of wheat annually. 4,000 sheep were kept and black and white rabbits ran wild on the island. By the time of the island's sale in 1911, 30,000 wallabies had been killed there. The island continued to be used mostly for farming, although that tailed off as transport costs rose. In the late 1970s, the island was bought by the Woolford family, who ran it as a sheep station for merinos. By 2020, there were only a few sheep and the island was used mainly for tourism (via house rental) and recreation.

== Conservation ==
Flinders Island is one of the islands included in the Investigator Islands Important Bird Area identified by BirdLife International, a non-statutory status, awarded in 2009 because of the island group's population of fairy tern (a vulnerable species), as well as significant populations of Cape Barren geese, Pacific gull and black-faced cormorant. Other birds for which the IBA is significant include large numbers of breeding short-tailed shearwaters and white-faced storm-petrels. The biome-restricted rock parrot has been recorded from most islands in the group.

An account of Flinders Island's wildlife published in 1934 stated that penguins could "be seen waddling soldier-like among the rocks and cave entrances that constitute their homes". In 2006 there was a colony of little penguins believed to be "probably declining", with an estimated population of fewer than twenty birds, nesting at the base of some cliffs where feral cats have limited access. A risk assessment for the penguins commissioned by Department for Environment & Natural Resources in 2016 report based their recommendations on the 2006 estimate. It reported that the feral cats were responsible for the probable decline, but if they were eliminated, the rat population would grow, so both would need to be removed.

A strip of land along the north coast of the island extending west from the island’s most northerly headland, Point Malcolm, has been the subject of the subject of a heritage agreement as a protected area since 29 August 1995. The parcel of land which is identified as No. HA1003 is sized at 279 hectares (690 acres). Since 2012, the waters adjoining the Flinders Island have been part of a habitat protection zone in the Investigator Marine Park.

In 2020 the owners signed an agreement with the Government of South Australia which places a conservation agreement over 3,400 hectares (8,400 acres), which is most of the island. The feral cats, black rats and mice, which threaten the bird life, need to be eradicated, and threatened animals will be introduced. The three-year Flinders Island Safe Haven Project received A$1.67 million through the Federal Government's Environment Restoration Fund, and A$1 million from the Government of South Australia to co-manage the establishment of the project with the Woolford family.

In early 2025 Federal Government funding was increased to A$3.8 million, with the aim of eradicating feral cats, black rats and mice by the end of 2025, with reintroductions of native species to take place one year after the island is declared as being pest-free. Native mammal species under consideration for placement on the island include the Shark Bay mouse, the greater stick-nest rat, a local subspecies of the southern brown bandicoot, and the banded hare-wallaby.

== Mining exploration ==
The island has been subject to diamond exploration following the discovery of a wide range of kimberlite indicator minerals there, which was continuing as of 2019.
