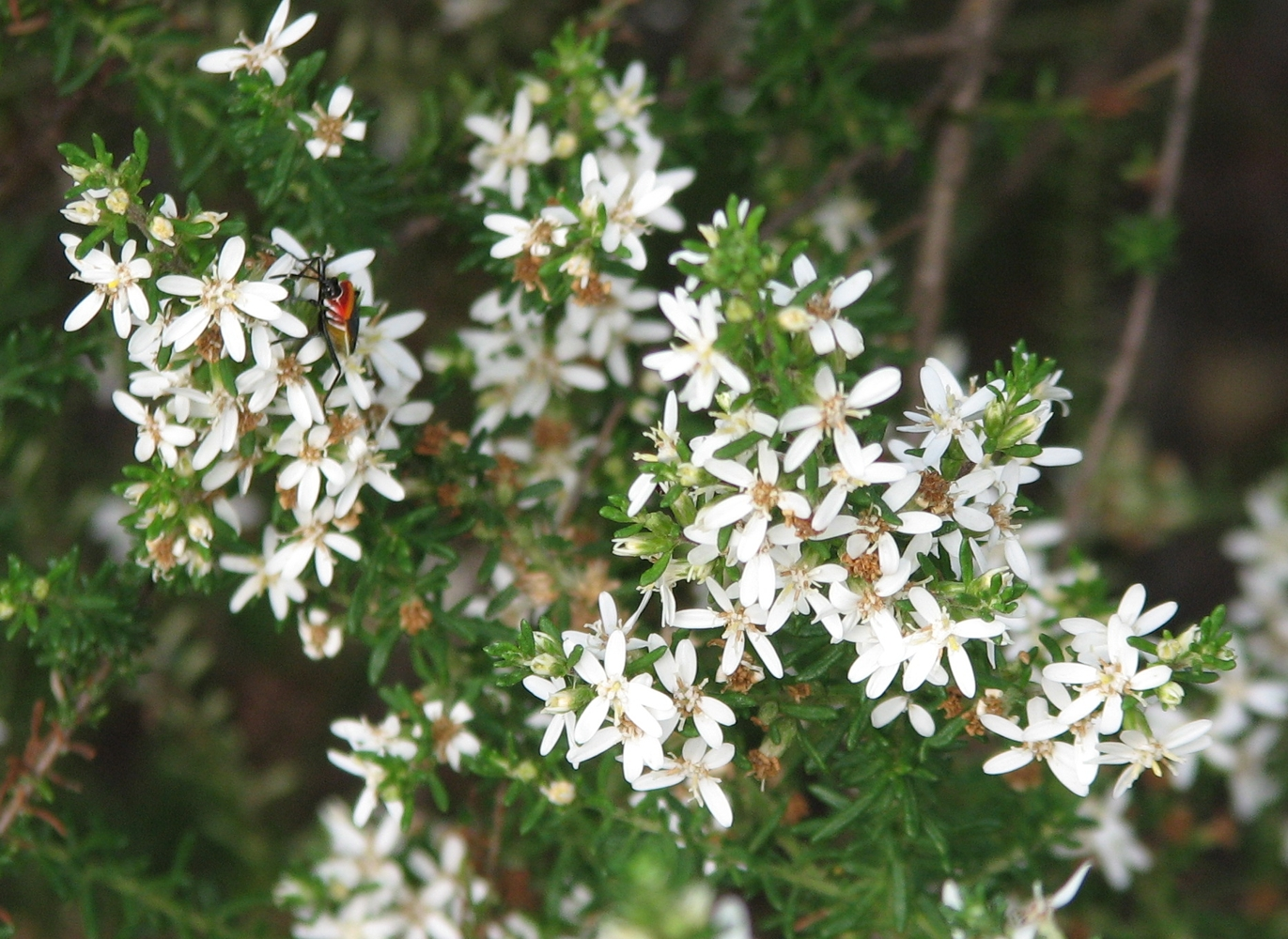
- In Box Hill South, Victoria

Scientific classification
- Kingdom: Plantae
- Clade: Tracheophytes
- Clade: Angiosperms
- Clade: Eudicots
- Clade: Asterids
- Order: Asterales
- Family: Asteraceae
- Genus: Olearia
- Species: O. ramulosa

Binomial name
- Olearia ramulosa (Labill.) Benth.

Synonyms
- List: Aster aculeatus Labill.; Aster benthami F.Muell. orth. var.; Aster benthamii F.Muell.; Aster ramulosus Labill.; Diplostephium aculeatum (Labill.) Nees; Diplostephium ramulosum (Labill.) Nees; Eurybia aculeata (Labill.) DC.; Eurybia collina Sond. nom. inval., pro syn.; Eurybia epileia DC.; Eurybia ramulosa (Labill.) DC.; Eurybia ramulosa var. aculeata (Labill.) Hook.f.; Eurybia ramulosa var. densa Hook.f.; Eurybia ramulosa var. elongata Hook.f.; Eurybia ramulosa var. ericaefolia Hook.f. orth. var.; Eurybia ramulosa var. ericifolia Hook.f.; Eurybia ramulosa var. floribunda Hook.f.; Eurybia ramulosa var. glabrata Sond.; Eurybia ramulosa var. grandiflora A.D.Chapm. orth. var.; Eurybia ramulosa var. grandifolia Hook.f.; Eurybia ramulosa var. laxa Hook.f.; Eurybia ramulosa (Labill.) DC. var. ramulosa; Olearia hookeri var. microcephala Benth.; Olearia ramulosa (Labill.) Benth. f. ramulosa; Olearia ramulosa var. communis Benth. nom. inval.; Olearia ramulosa var. longisetosa J.H.Willis; Olearia ramulosa var. microcephala (Benth.) J.H.Willis; Olearia ramulosa (Labill.) Benth. var. ramulosa; Olearia ramulosa var. rigida J.H.Willis; Olearia ramulosa var. stricta (Benth.) J.H.Willis; Olearia ramulosa var. tomentosa J.H.Willis; Olearia stricta Benth.; Shawia aculeata (Labill.) Sch.Bip.; Shawia epileia (DC.) Sch.Bip.; Shawia ramulosa (Labill.) Sch.Bip.

= Olearia ramulosa =

Species of flowering plant

Olearia ramulosa, commonly known as twiggy daisy-bush, is a species of flowering plant in the family Asteraceae and is endemic to south-eastern Australia. It is a shrub with narrowly elliptic, linear or narrowly egg-shaped leaves, and pale blue, mauve or white and yellow, daisy-like inflorescences.

== Description ==
Olearia ramulosa is a shrub that typically grows to a height of 1.6 m (5 ft 3 in). Its leaves are alternately arranged along the stems, narrowly elliptic, linear or narrowly egg-shaped with the narrower end towards tha base, 2–8 mm (0.079–0.315 in) long and 0.8–2.5 mm (0.031–0.098 in) wide with the edges rolled under. The upper surface of the leaf is covered with minute pimples and the lower surface is covered with grey, woolly hairs. The heads or daisy-like "flowers" are arranged in leaf axils or on the ends of branches and are sessile or on a peduncle up to 14 mm (0.55 in) long. The heads are 10–20 mm (0.39–0.79 in) in diameter with a conical involucre 3–6 mm (0.12–0.24 in) long at the base. Each head has 2 to 13 pale blue, mauve or white ray florets surrounding 3 to 13 yellow disc florets. Flowering occurs from October to May and the fruit is a silky-hairy achene, the pappus with 22 to 41 bristles.

== Taxonomy ==
Jacques Labillardière described the twiggy daisy bush as Aster ramulosus in 1806, in volume 2 of his Novae Hollandiae Plantarum Specimen, from material collected in Tasmania.

In 1867, George Bentham changed the name to Olearia ramulosus in Flora Australiensis. The specific epithet (ramulosus) means "bearing branches".

Other botanists gave the species other names, but the name accepted by the Australian Plant Census is Olearia ramulosa. Those other botanists included German botanist Christian Gottfried Daniel Nees von Esenbeck who changed Labillardière's Aster ramulosus to Diplostephium ramulosum in 1832, and Swiss botanist Augustin Pyramus de Candolle who changed Labillardière's name to Eurybia ramulosa in 1836.

Alternative common names are oily bush and water cypress.

== Distribution and habitat ==
Olearia ramulosa grows in forest, woodland and scrub, and is widespread and common from south-eastern Queensland, through New South Wales, the Australian Capital Territory and eastern Victoria to south-eastern South Australia and Tasmania.

== Ecology ==
The plant is eaten by caterpillars of the moth species Amelora milvaria. Bees, beetles, and less commonly flies and wasps have been recorded visiting flowers in a Tasmanian field study.

== Use in horticulture ==
Olearia ramulosa can be propagated by seeds or cuttings of new growth that has hardened. It can be grown in dry or temperate climates and is frost-hardy in sunny or part-shaded spots. Pruning can invigorate it and it can be grown as a low hedge.
