= Investigator Marine Park =

Protected area in South Australia

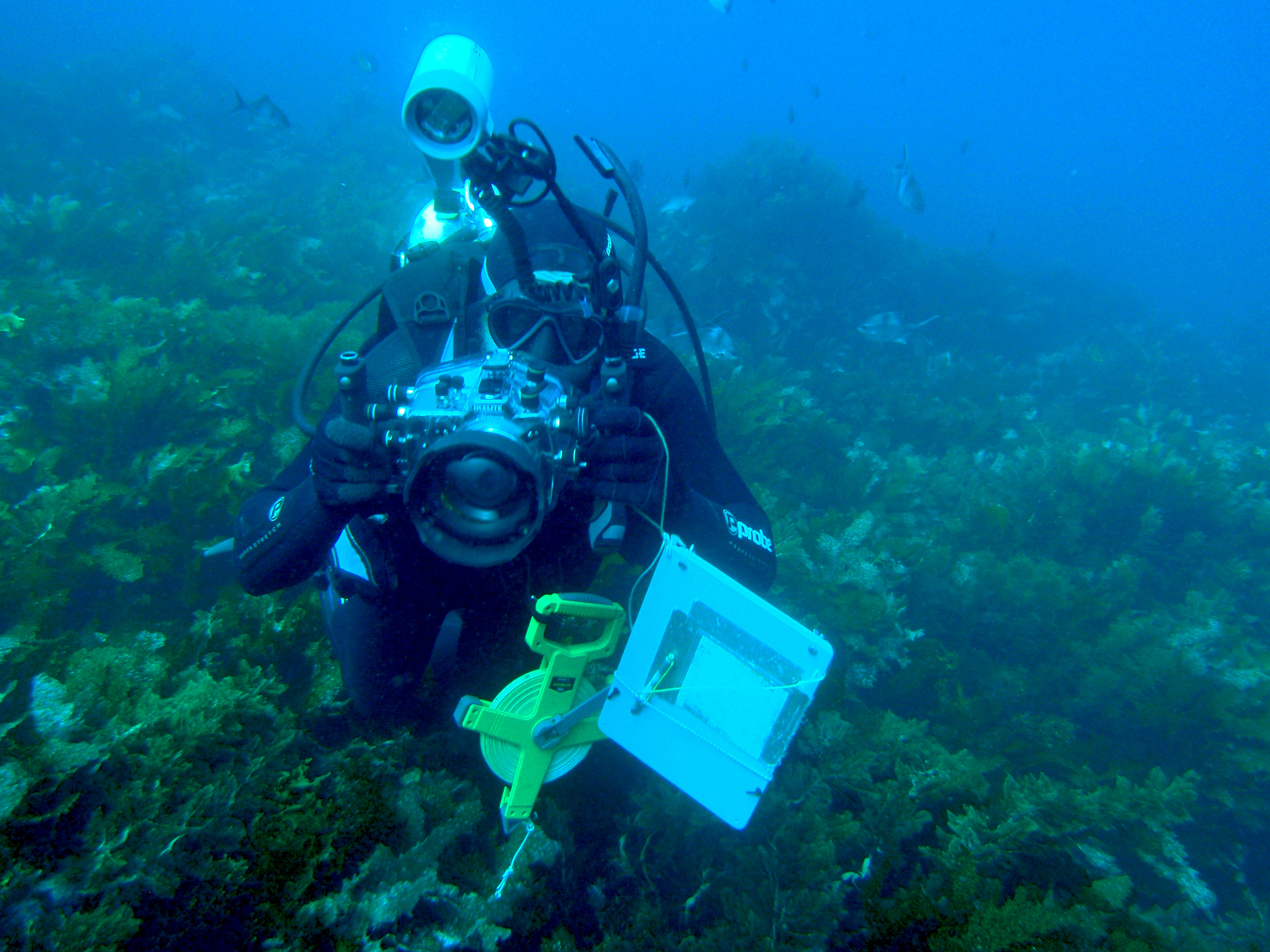
- A diver carrying out survey work within the marine park.

- Location within South Australia
- Location: South Australia
- Nearest city: Elliston
- Coordinates: 33°43′46″S 134°38′44″E
- Area: 1,185 km^{2} (458 sq mi)
- Established: 29 January 2009
- Governing body: Department of Environment and Water
- Website: Official website

Investigator Marine Park is a marine protected area in the Australian state of South Australia located in the state's coastal waters in its west adjoining the west coast of Eyre Peninsula and islands in the Investigator Group respectively to the south-east and south-west of the town of Elliston.

The marine park was established on 29 January 2009 by proclamation under the Marine Parks Act 2007.

The Investigator Marine Park consists of four parts which extend from "median high water" to the edge of coastal waters. The first part extends along the coastland of Eyre Peninsula from Point Drummond in the south-east to just south of Elliston in the north-west including Cap Island, the second part surrounding Flinders Island and the Topgallant Islands and the third and fourth parts respectively surrounding the Ward Islands and the Pearson Isles.

The marine park is divided into zones to managing the marine environment to ensure varying degrees of “protection for habitats and biodiversity” and varying levels of “ecologically sustainable development and use” as follows:

1. Three “sanctuary zones” which adjoin the coastline near Sheringa and surround the Topgallant Islands and Pearson Isles, and where “the removal or harm of plants, animals or marine products” is prohibited,
2. Six “habitat protection zones” of which three are located in the part of the marine park adjoining the coastline with the remaining three zones occupying the remainder of the parts which surround islands in the Investigator Group, and where “activities and uses that do not harm habitats or the functioning of ecosystems” are only permitted,
3. Three “general managed use zones” which are located in the part of the marine park adjoining the coastline and where “ecologically sustainable development and use” is allowed.

As of 2016, the marine park has been classified under International Union for Conservation of Nature system of protected area categories with the “sanctuary zones” being IUCN Category II, the “habitat protection zones” being IUCN Category IV and the “general managed use zones” being IUCN Category VI.

== See also ==
- Protected areas of South Australia
- Western Eyre Marine Park
