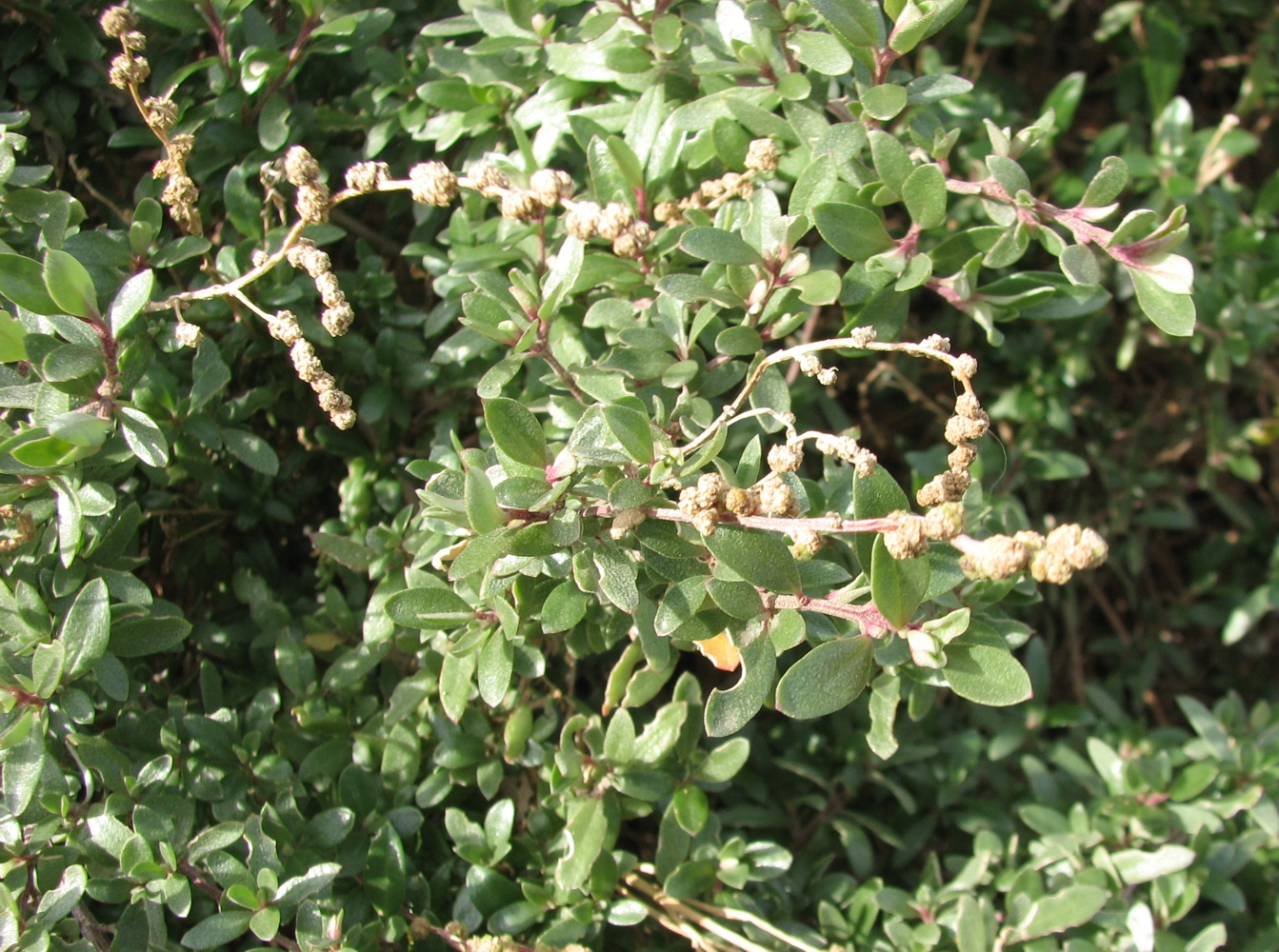
- Atriplex paludosa at Altona Coastal Park, Victoria

Scientific classification
- Kingdom: Plantae
- Clade: Tracheophytes
- Clade: Angiosperms
- Clade: Eudicots
- Order: Caryophyllales
- Family: Amaranthaceae
- Genus: Atriplex
- Species: A. paludosa

Binomial name
- Atriplex paludosa R.Br.

= Atriplex paludosa =

Marsh saltbush

Species of flowering plant

Atriplex paludosa, commonly known as marsh saltbush, is a species of saltbush endemic to Australia.

== Description ==
It grows as an erect shrub up to one metre (3 ft 3 in) high. Leaves are oval in shape, 1–4 centimetres (0.4–1.6 in) long, and 2–15 millimetres (0.079–0.59 in) wide.

== Taxonomy ==
It was first published by Robert Brown in 1810 based on specimen material collected at Port Dalrymple, the site of present-day Launceston, Tasmania. Four subspecies are recognised: A. paludosa subsp. paludosa, A. paludosa subsp. baudinii, A. paludosa subsp. cordata and A. paludosa subsp. moquiniana.

== Distribution and habitat ==
It occurs in southwestern Western Australia, South Australia, Victoria and coastal Tasmania.
