= Cape Finniss =

Cape Finniss South Australia
- Coordinates: 33°37′25″S 134°49′45″E
- Elevation: 47 m (154 ft)
- Location: 6 km (4 mi) Northwest by west of Elliston
- LGA(s): District Council of Elliston

Cape Finniss (also spelt Cape Finnis) is a headland located at the southern extremity of Anxious Bay on the west coast of Eyre Peninsula in South Australia about 6 kilometres (3.7 miles) Northwest by west of the town of Elliston. It is described as being ‘a rocky headland with a rounded top, 47 metres (154 feet) high.’ Cape Finniss is linked by a submerged reef which is considered to be ‘remnants of a once more prominent Cape Finnis(s)’ to the Waldegrave Islands which are located to the cape's north west.
