= Lady Bay (Victoria) =

Beach in Torquay, Victoria, Australia

Lady Bay Warrnambool Beach Surfside Beach McGennans Beach Granny's Grave Beach The Flume Beach
- Beach
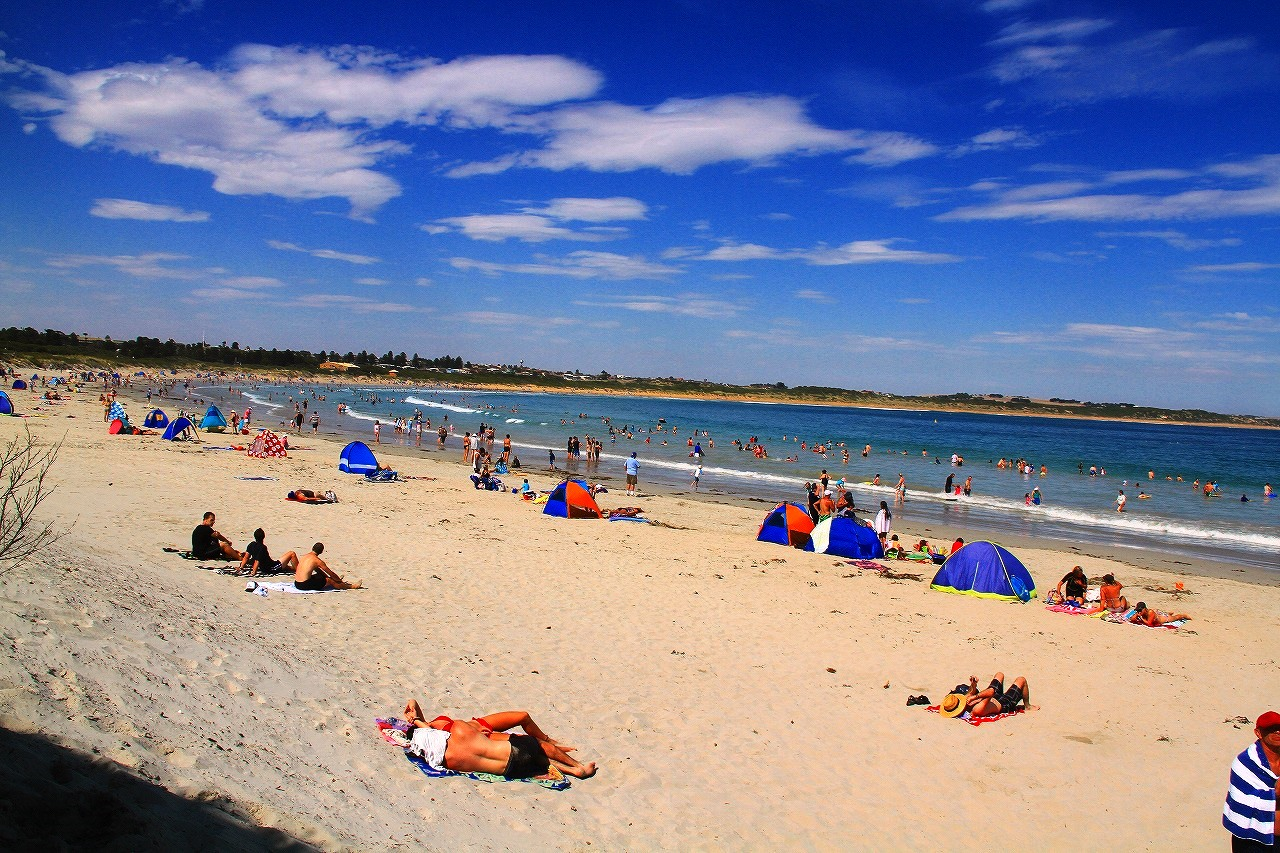
- Lady Bay
- Interactive map of Lady Bay
- Coordinates: 38°23′38″S 142°28′57″E
- Location: Warrnambool, Victoria, Australia
- Water bodies: (Lady Bay) Bass Strait

Dimensions
  - Length: 3.5 kilometres (2.2 mi)
- Hazard rating: 6/10 (moderately hazardous)
- Access: Pertobe Road, Merri Street, Worm Bay Road

Lady Bay (also known as Warrnambool Beach) is a large coastal bay and beach located at Warrnambool, Victoria, Australia. Forming the city's main recreational coastline, the beach extends along the western foreshore between the Merri River and Point Ritchie, providing a range of activities including swimming, surfing, fishing, sailing and windsurfing. The bay is backed by extensive foreshore reserves, parks and recreational facilities, including the Warrnambool Foreshore Promenade, which links the historic breakwater with Logans Beach along a 5.7-kilometre shared pathway. Sections of the beach have also been given the names McGennans Beach, The Flume Beach, Granny's Grave Beach, and Surfside Beach, named after adjacent surfing areas.

== History ==
The first known European visitor to Lady Bay was French navigator and explorer Nicolas Baudin, who visited the area in 1802 during his voyage along the Australian coastline. During the 1830s, whalers and sealers used the bay seasonally, and the area was surveyed and named Lady Bay by whalers in 1844.

When the township of Warrnambool was established in 1847, Lady Bay was regarded as a naturally sheltered harbour suitable for shipping. However, as maritime activity increased, the need for improved navigational infrastructure became apparent. A jetty was constructed in 1850, and the bay subsequently became an important port for exporting agricultural products from the surrounding region, including wool, wheat, potatoes, onions and dairy produce. Warrnambool was declared a free port in 1854.

The construction of coastal structures, including the Warrnambool breakwater from the 1850s onwards, significantly altered sediment movement within the bay. As a result, the western section of Lady Bay expanded seaward by several hundred metres over time as sand accumulated along the shoreline.

The Warrnambool Surf Life Saving Club was established in 1930 and is among the oldest surf lifesaving clubs in Victoria. The club continues to provide patrol services during the summer months and popular holiday periods, contributing to the safety of visitors using the beach.

== Description ==
Lady Bay forms a 3.5-kilometre beach that initially faces south before curving eastwards near the Warrnambool breakwater. The beach extends from the western breakwater to Point Ritchie and varies significantly in character due to changes in exposure and wave protection. Near the breakwater, waves are generally small, averaging less than 0.5 metres, while wave heights increase towards the surf lifesaving club and Point Ritchie.

The western section of the beach is relatively sheltered, with lower waves, a wide shallow sandbar and fewer rips, making it the preferred area for swimming. Further east, towards Point Ritchie, stronger waves and more frequent rip currents occur. Visitors are advised to swim between the flags within the patrolled area, particularly as afternoon winds can increase surf conditions and currents.

Surfing is most popular at locations further along the beach where waves are more consistent, including The Flume, a break influenced by nearby rock and reef formations. Other surf locations include the Granny's reef break near Point Ritchie and the Maginines beach break near the caravan park. Fishing is also popular, with the breakwater providing access for offshore anglers and the eastern sections of the beach containing gutters and rip holes suitable for beach fishing.

The foreshore surrounding Lady Bay is an important recreational area for Warrnambool residents and visitors. The Foreshore Promenade provides a continuous path for walking, cycling, skating and wheelchair access, passing attractions including the historic breakwater, Lake Pertobe, the bay itself and the Hopkins River mouth before reaching Logans Beach.

Lady Bay also contains numerous historic shipwreck sites, with more than 29 wrecks located within the bay and interpretive signage highlighting the area's maritime history.

While much of the shoreline east of the Lady Bay Boat Ramp ahs continued to grow overall since the last twentieth century, sections of the western coastline have undergone periods of retreat following major storms. Coastal erosion has affected dunes and beach access points, creating ongoing challenges for the management of the coastline.

== See also ==
- Flagstaff Hill Maritime Village
- Thirteenth Beach
- Torquay Surf Beach
- Torquay Front Beach
- Jan Juc Beach
- Great Ocean Road
