= Oddball (film) =

2015 film by Stuart McDonald

- Theatrical release poster
- Directed by: Stuart McDonald
- Written by: Peter Ivan; Steve Oedekerk
- Produced by: Richard Keddie; Sheila Hanahan; Stephen Kearney
- Starring: Shane Jacobson; Sarah Snook; Alan Tudyk; Coco Jack Gillies; Richard Davies; Deborah Mailman
- Cinematography: Damian E. Wyvill
- Edited by: Marcus D'Arcy; Cindy Clarkson; Max Miller
- Music by: Cezary Skubiszewski
- Production companies: Screen Australia; WTFN; Fox International Channels; Practical Pictures; The Film Company; Kmunications; Film Victoria
- Distributed by: Roadshow Films
- Release date: 17 September 2015 (Australia)
- Running time: 95 minutes
- Country: Australia
- Language: English
- Budget: $7 million
- Box office: $11 million

Oddball (released as Oddball and the Penguins in some regions) is a 2015 Australian family comedy adventure film directed by Stuart McDonald in his feature directional debut. It stars Shane Jacobson, Sarah Snook, Alan Tudyk, Coco Jack Gillies, Richard Davies and Deborah Mailman. The film was released in Australia on 17 September 2015 by Roadshow Films, and is based on a true story.

== Plot ==
On Middle Island off the coast of Warrnambool, Australian little penguins have made their home, but foxes have learned how to swim to the island and had reduced the population of penguins. Emily Marsh walks on the island counting the minimal number of penguins left after another attack by foxes, along with her co-workers Zoe, Paul Watt, and her friend Jack Jones. Meanwhile, an eccentric chicken farmer named Swampy Marsh, Emily's estranged father, is seen walking through his barn full of chickens and feeding his dogs, Missy and Oddball. Elsewhere in the centre of Warrnambool, 9-year-old Olivia Marsh, Emily's daughter, and Swampy's granddaughter packs her lunch and opens a gift from her mother's love interest Bradley Slater, of whom she and Swampy disapprove. As she gets driven to school by Swampy, accompanied by the mischievous Oddball, and tries to get out, Oddball jumps out and wreaks havoc all over Warrnambool, eventually destroying a tourism attraction Bradley is attempting to set up. In the courthouse later in the day, Oddball is given one last chance at behaving, or he will get put down if he enters the city again. That night, Swampy finds an injured penguin attacked by a fox on Middle Island and takes it to his house, where a fox attempts to eat it but is scared off by Oddball. Surprised by Oddball's sudden change in his ability to protect other animals, he conceives an idea to save the dwindling penguin colony. Olivia enthusiastically agrees with the concept and names the injured penguin Pocket. They begin training Oddball and convince Emily to go on a holiday to Melbourne with Bradley, where he proposes that they and Olivia move to New York City. While Emily and Bradley are away, Olivia and Swampy sleep on Middle Island for the night to see if Oddball is up to the challenge. They also release the now-healed Pocket back into the wild. Upon seeing that Oddball successfully guards the penguins, Swampy decides to put Oddball on the island alone for a night to see how he copes.

After Oddball successfully fends off a fox and protects Pocket and his significant other, he and Olivia decide that the dog can guard the birds nightly. After the penguin numbers steadily rise, Emily learns of Swampy's plan after Olivia accidentally blurts it out. Emily eventually approves and warns that Oddball could get into trouble if the council finds out. Swampy assumes that Bradley is sabotaging the penguins because Bradley is so eager about a whale-watching idea. The whale-watching station would supplant the penguin sanctuary. That night, after going home from dropping Oddball off on the island, Oddball tries to fend off a decoy fox and gets shot by a tranquilizer gun off-screen by an unknown person. Swampy accuses Emily of running away after she proposes to follow Bradley's plan to move away with him and Olivia, and she says the sanctuary is done. Outraged and offended by her father's comments, Emily says that she put more effort into the penguin sanctuary than he did when her mum died. Swampy later finds Oddball in the back of the animal control van, where he finds a matching wound to a tranquilizer dart. The animal catcher tells Swampy that he cannot save Oddball and drives off after giving him a final moment with the dog. After learning that Pocket and his female friend have laid an egg, he works with Olivia to save Oddball. Emily and Jack go to Jack's house and find some of his tranquilizer guns, fox cages, and tranquilliser darts missing.

After saving Oddball, Swampy and Olivia meet Emily and the slightly drugged Jack (from a dart gun accident) at the beach connecting to Middle Island. Oddball and Olivia sneak to the island and are followed by the worried Emily and Swampy. Oddball finds the person sabotaging the island, releasing a fox. After a brief confrontation, Emily calls out to the person, assuming it is Bradley, to stop, but the person is revealed to be Zoe. She explains that the whale-watching promoter is her boyfriend and wants the whale-watching plan to go through just so she can get out of her job, which she secretly hates. She then grabs Pocket's egg and attempts to destroy it, but Emily and Olivia prevent her. Emily accidentally kicks the egg off the cliff, but it stops before it can reach the sea. Zoe is shot with a tranquilizer dart and arrested by Jack, and Oddball carefully retrieves the egg with guidance from Swampy, Emily, and Olivia. Emily dismisses Bradley's idea to move away and reconciles with Swampy. The sanctuary has been saved, and the Maremma conservation project has been approved.

== Cast ==
- Shane Jacobson as Swampy
- Sarah Snook as Emily Marsh
- Alan Tudyk as Bradley Slater
- Coco Jack Gillies as Olivia
- Richard Davies as Jack Jones
- Deborah Mailman as Mayor Lake/narrator
- Terry Camilleri as Judge Burns
- Frank Woodley as the dog catcher
- Tegan Higginbotham as Zoe
- Oddball played by Kai
- Fox played by Stinky

== Production ==
This is a dramatisation based on true events. The dog used both in the true event and in the dramatized film is a Maremma Sheepdog. The original conservation project in which Maremma sheepdogs were trained to defend the penguins from foxes began in 2006.

== Release ==
Oddball had its North American premiere at the opening weekend of Indianapolis's Heartland Film Festival in October 2015 and opened the Toronto International Film Festival for Kids in 2016. It was an Official Selection, playing opening weekend at Chicago International Children's Film Festival, Sedona International Film Festival, Sonoma Film Festival, Environmental Film Festival in the Nation's Capital in Washington D.C., Cleveland Film Festival, Dallas International Film Festival, Miami International Film Festival, Newport Beach Film Festival, Wisconsin Film Festival, Mill Valley Film Festival, and Traverse City Film Festival, among others. It also received a screening at Utah's Tumbleweeds Film Festival and Palm Springs International Film Festival.

The film was released internationally in Bolivia, Italy, New Zealand, Poland, Slovenia, and the United Kingdom (Icon Film Distribution).

The film was released on DVD, Blu-ray and video on demand platforms in Australia on 16 December 2015.

== Reception ==
=== Critical response ===
Oddball received positive reviews from critics. On the review aggregator website Rotten Tomatoes, the film holds an approval rating of 87% based on reviews from 23 critics, with an average rating of 6.1/10.

Luke Buckmaster of The Guardian wrote, "Some kinks in the writing notwithstanding, Oddball is fun and thoughtfully minded, with a sweet charm that endears from the get-go." Erin Free of FilmInk wrote, "Oddball's brand of fun-with-heart will hopefully click with local kids and their parents too." Matt Neal of The Standard gave a positive review, saying, "You'd have to be heartless to hate Oddball."

Jake Wilson of the Sydney Morning Herald gave a negative review, writing "Unfortunately, they appear to have lost sight of the golden rule for family movies of this type, which is to keep the focus squarely on the animals or, failing that, on the kids." Sandra Hall, also of the Sydney Morning Herald, wrote "Jacobson is so intent on its efforts to firm up Swampy's credentials as an impractical but inspired eccentric that he's in danger of turning him into a gormless irritant." Francesca Rudkin of NZ Herald rated the film three stars out of five, calling it "gloriously old-fashioned live action film." She noted that the scenes are "less impressive" set on the island, which have "obviously been shot in a studio." She also noted that director Stuart McDonald, from a "television background and takes an upbeat approach" to his directorial film debut, he rather than the "usual Aussie deadpan humour he's opted for an exaggerated slapstick approach, which makes the cast look like they're overacting or trying too hard, but which will likely appeal to younger audiences."

=== Box office ===
The Australian box office return for Oddball hit A$11,085,092 in 2015 from a production budget of A$7,000,000. On limited release through Village Roadshow (Australia) on 17 September 2015, the film grossed nearly A$1M from 289 theatre screens on its opening weekend, ranking fifth in Australia for all films. It rose to number four the following weekend, taking nearly A$1.8M and expanding to 293 theatres. Peaking on the first weekend in October, it was ranked number three and viewing at 297 venues. The film ran exclusively on Village Roadshow for 12 weeks until late November.

The film is ranked on Screen Australia's "Films Most popular in their Own Backyard" as number six and on their "100 Most Popular Australian Films" list as number 26.

=== Accolades ===
Award	Category	Subject	Result
AACTA Awards (5th)	Best Cinematography	Damian Wyvill	Nominated
AACTA Awards (5th)	People's Choice Award for Favourite Australian Film	Stuart McDonald	Nominated
AFCA Award	Best Supporting Actress	Sarah Snook	Nominated
FCCA Awards	Best Children's Film	Sheila Hanahan	Nominated
FCCA Awards	Best Children's Film	Stephen Kearney	Nominated
FCCA Awards	Best Children's Film	Richard Keddie	Nominated
FCCA Awards	Best Performance by a Young Actor	Coco Jack Gillies	Won
Mill Valley Film Festival	Audience Award for Best Family Film	Stuart McDonald	Won
Screen Music Awards	Feature Film Score of the Year	Cezary Skubiszewski	Nominated
Seattle International Film Festival	Films4Families Youth Jury Award	Stuart McDonald	Nominated
Traverse City Film Festival	Stuart Hollander Prize for Best Kids Film	Stuart McDonald	Won
