= King's College, Warrnambool =

King's College

Location
- 44 Balmoral Road; Warrnambool, Victoria, 3280; Australia; 38°21′42.6″S 142°30′22.2″E

Information
- Type: private, co-educational
- Denomination: Presbyterian
- Established: 1986
- Status: Open
- Principal: Allister Rouse
- Years offered: Kindergarten to Year 12
- Gender: Co-educational
- Houses: Knox, Luther & Calvin
- Colours: Navy & Maroon
- Slogan: Faith, Knowledge & Wisdom in Christ
- Communities served: Warrnambool and District
- Website: kings.vic.edu.au

King's College, Warrnambool is a private, co-educational Christian school located in Warrnambool, Victoria, Australia. It was founded in 1986 and provides education from Kindergarten through to Year 12.

== History ==
In 1983, members of the Presbyterian Church in Warrnambool began discussing the possibility of establishing a Christian school for the local community. The school was registered in August 1984 as 'Warrnambool Presbyterian School Ltd'. The following year the Balmoral Road location was purchased for AUD$93,000.

In 1986, King's College opened, using a small room they had rented in town. Initially, there were 19 students. The year after, they moved to the Balmoral Road site, where some portable classrooms were set up and the first building, a toilet block, was constructed. There were 26 students that year.

1990 saw the appointment of King's College's first principal, Peter Bosker. There were 106 students enrolled that year. Bosker served as principal for 3 years with Neil Benfell later taking over. Benfell was not new to the school, however, as the founding of the school is largely attributed to him.

In 1997, King's College began to offer preschool classes, and in 1998, they began to branch into secondary schooling. This involved an initial class of Year 7s in 1998, who became the first of each year level as they progressed through. This meant that the first Year 12s graduated from King's College in December 2003.

Following Neil Benfell's retirement after almost two decades of service to the school, Ian McKay was appointed principal in 2011 and remained in the position until the end of 2016.

In 2017, Allister Rouse was appointed Principal. He was dismissed from the position in 2026 due to allegations of inappropriate conduct with students and findings of policy breaches by the Victorian Institue of Teaching and Victorian Registration and Qualifications Authority. The school continues to operate with an interim Principal in place.
