= Warrnambool =

- City
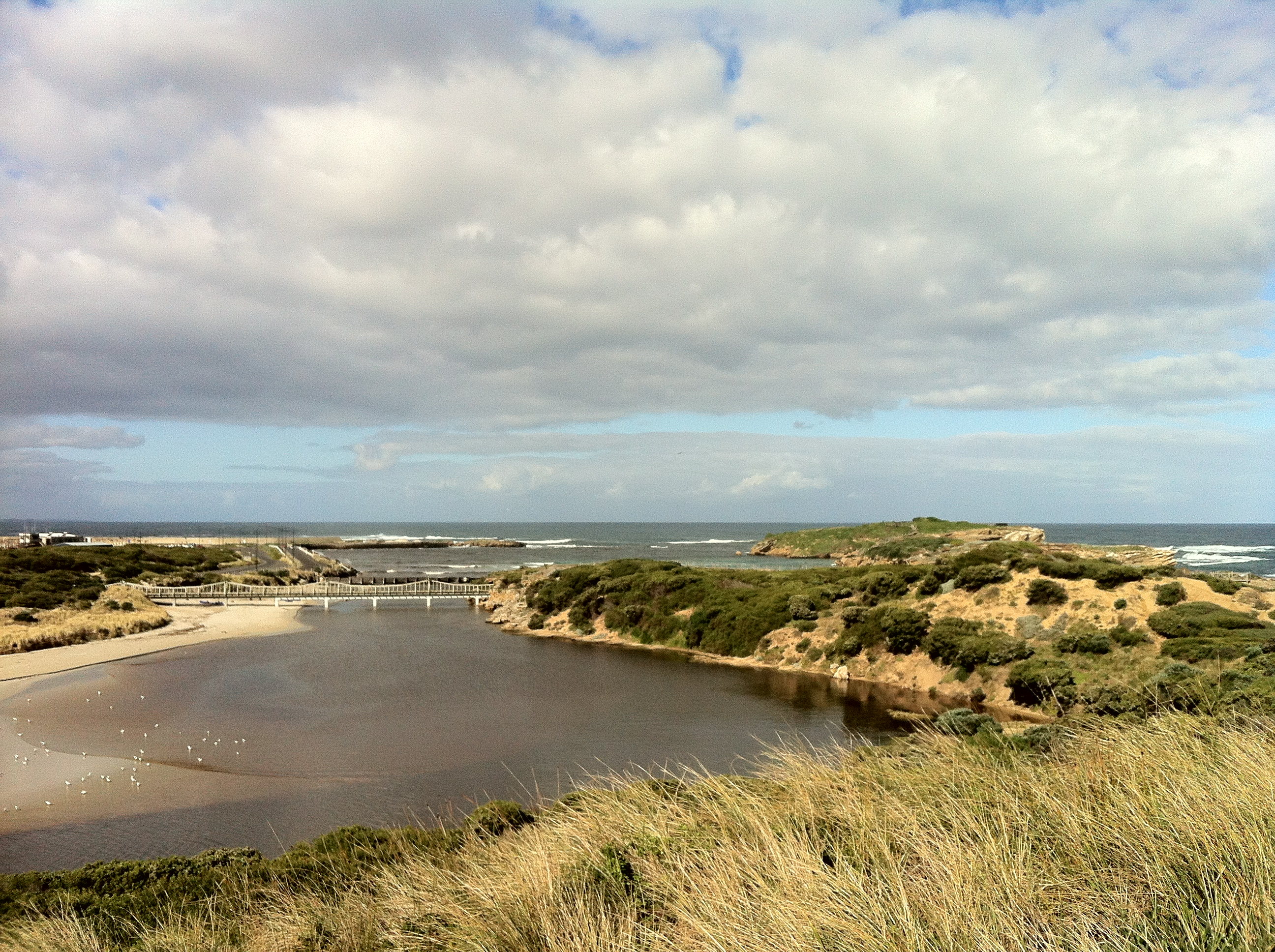
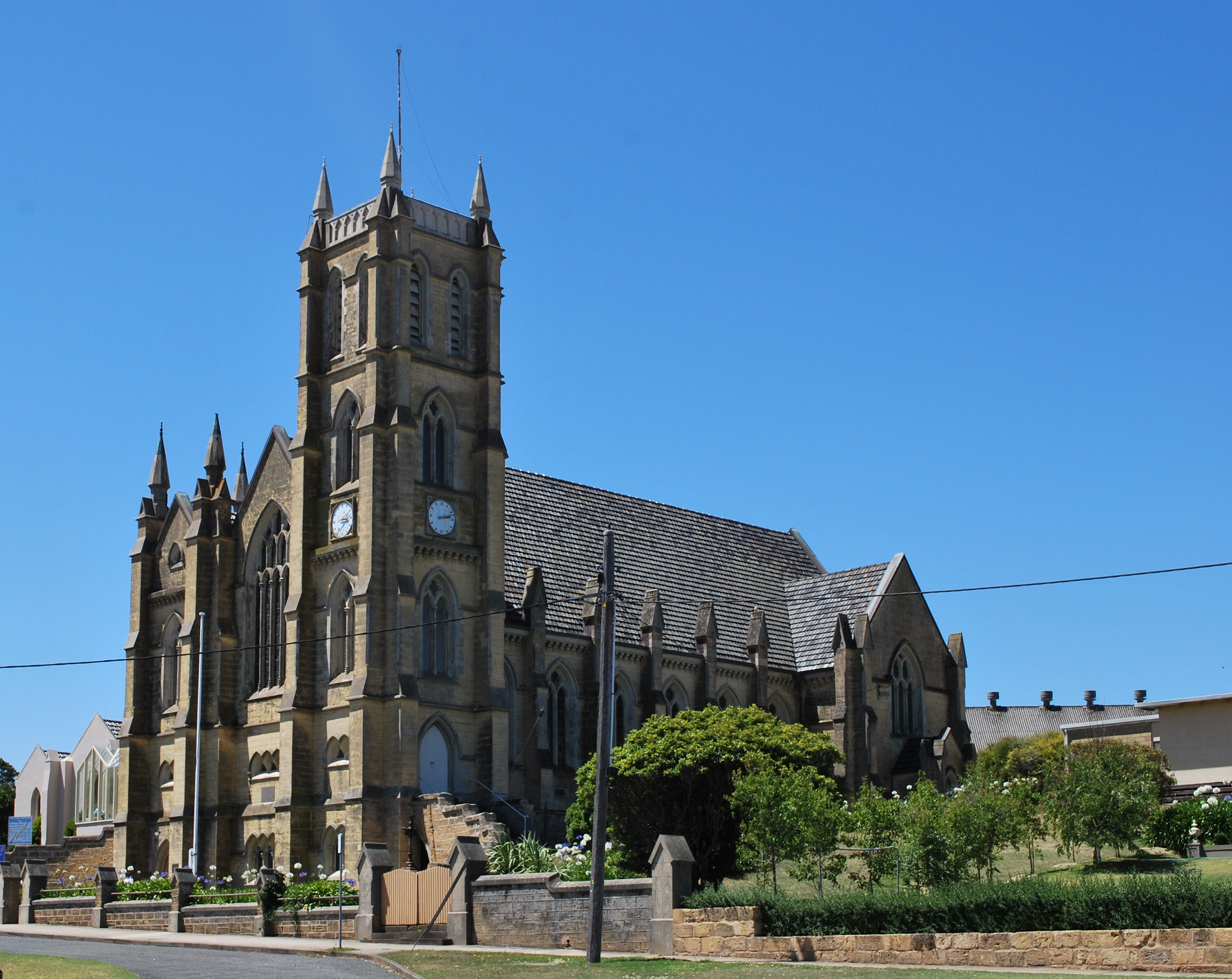
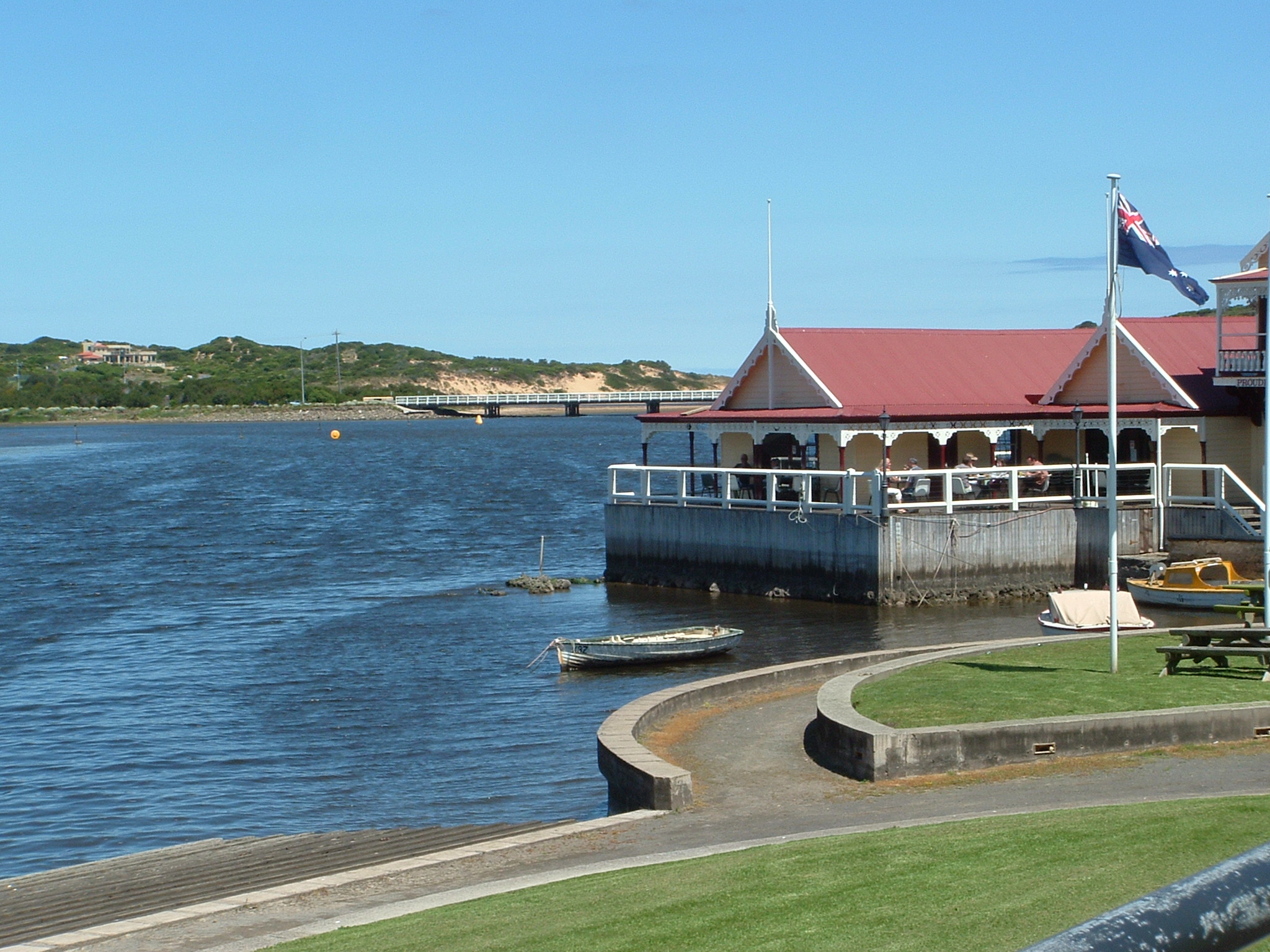
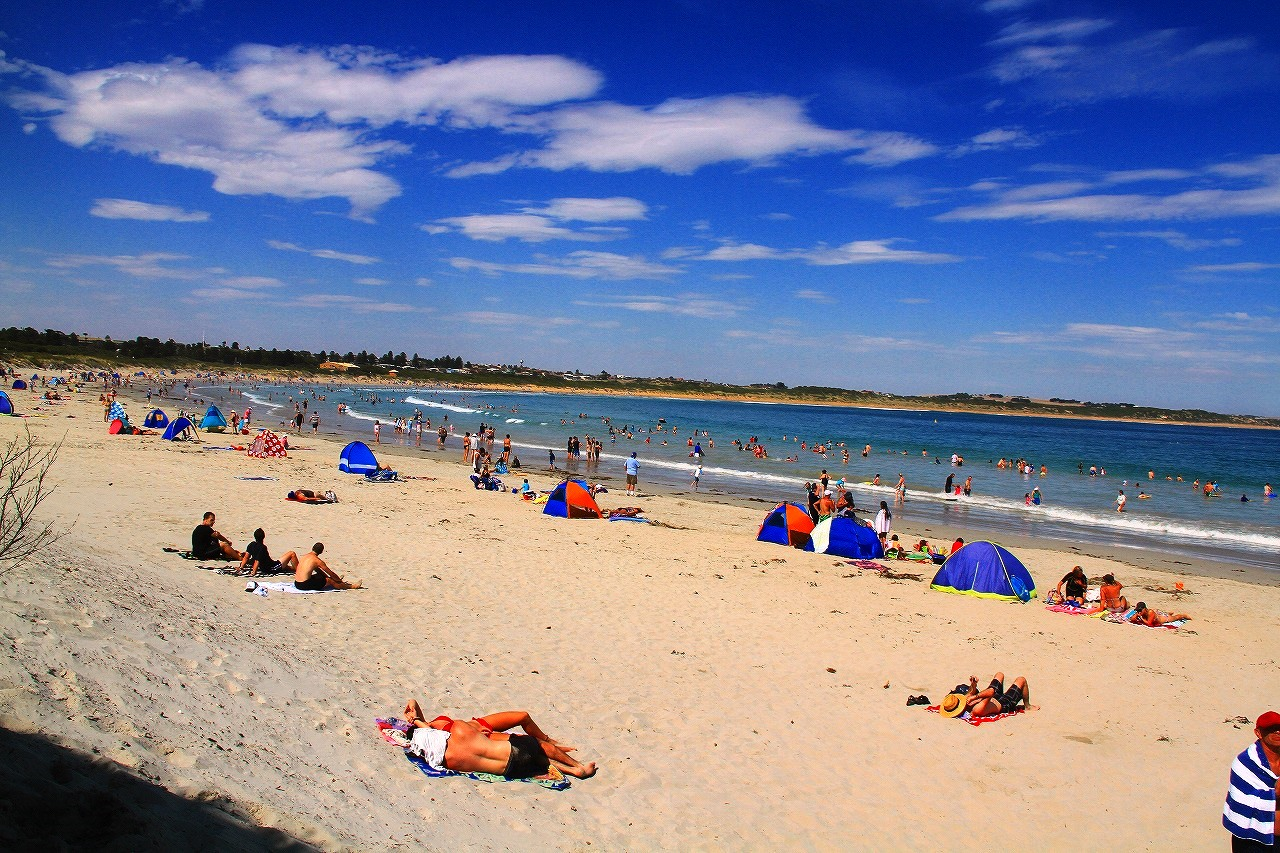
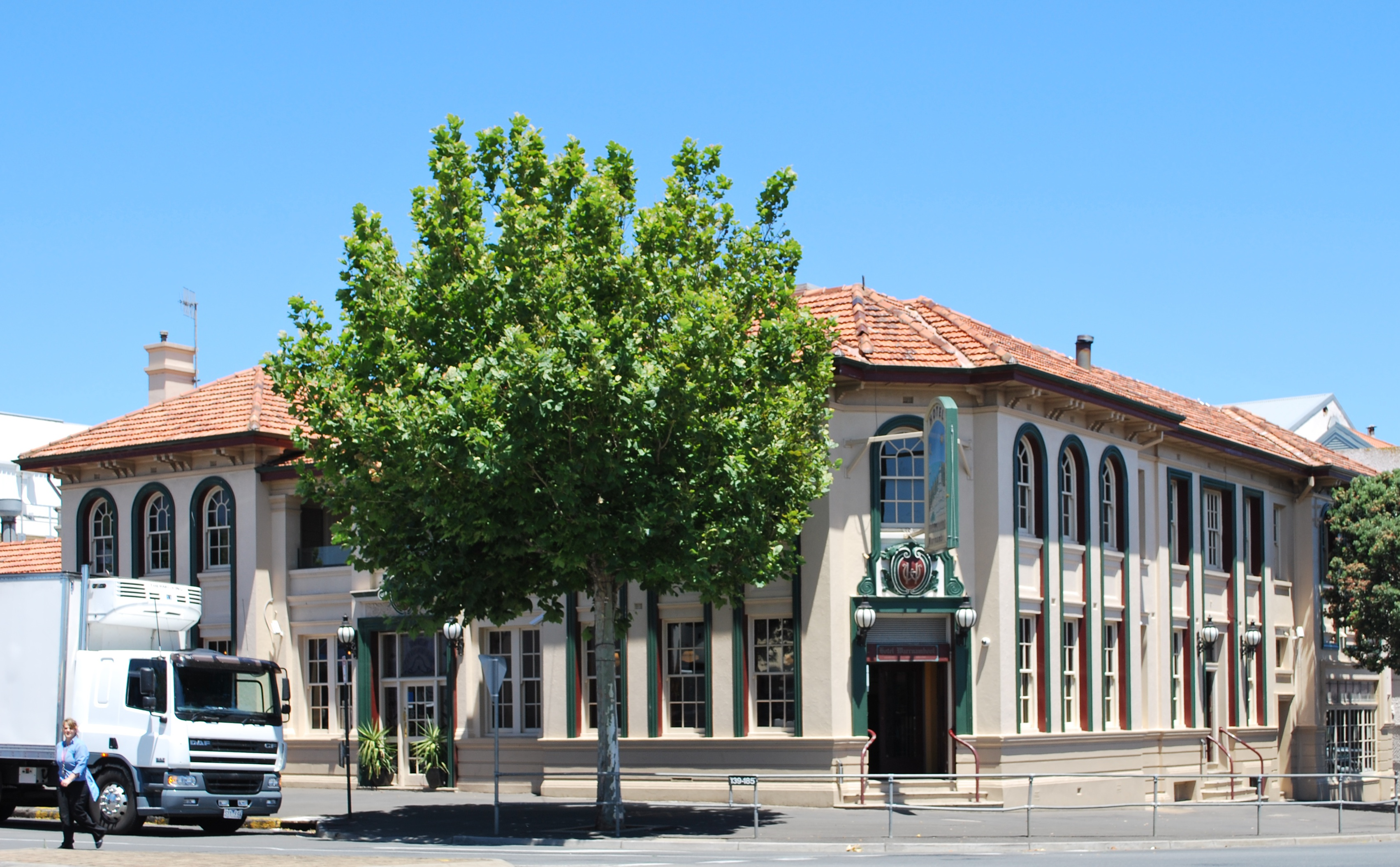
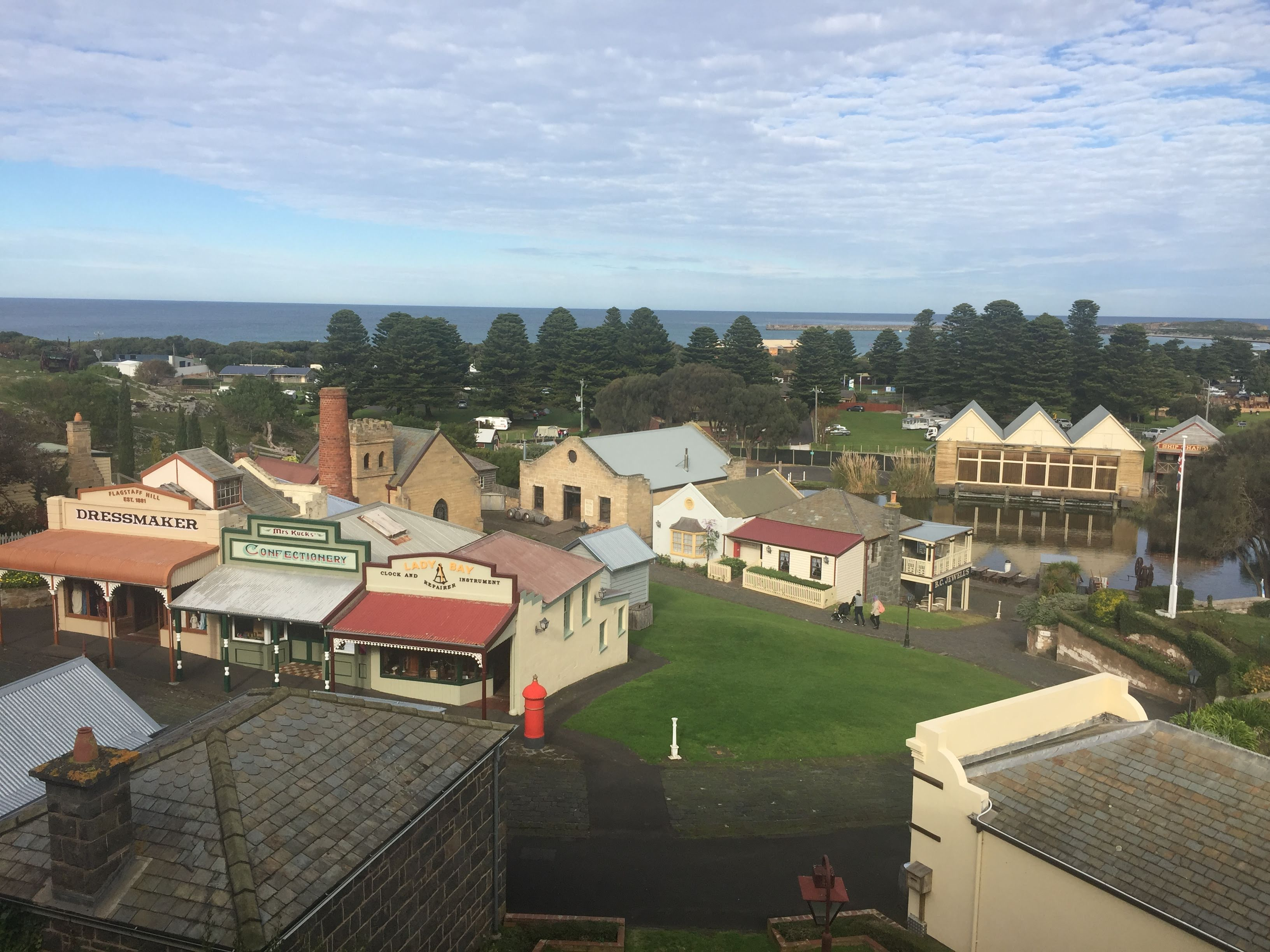
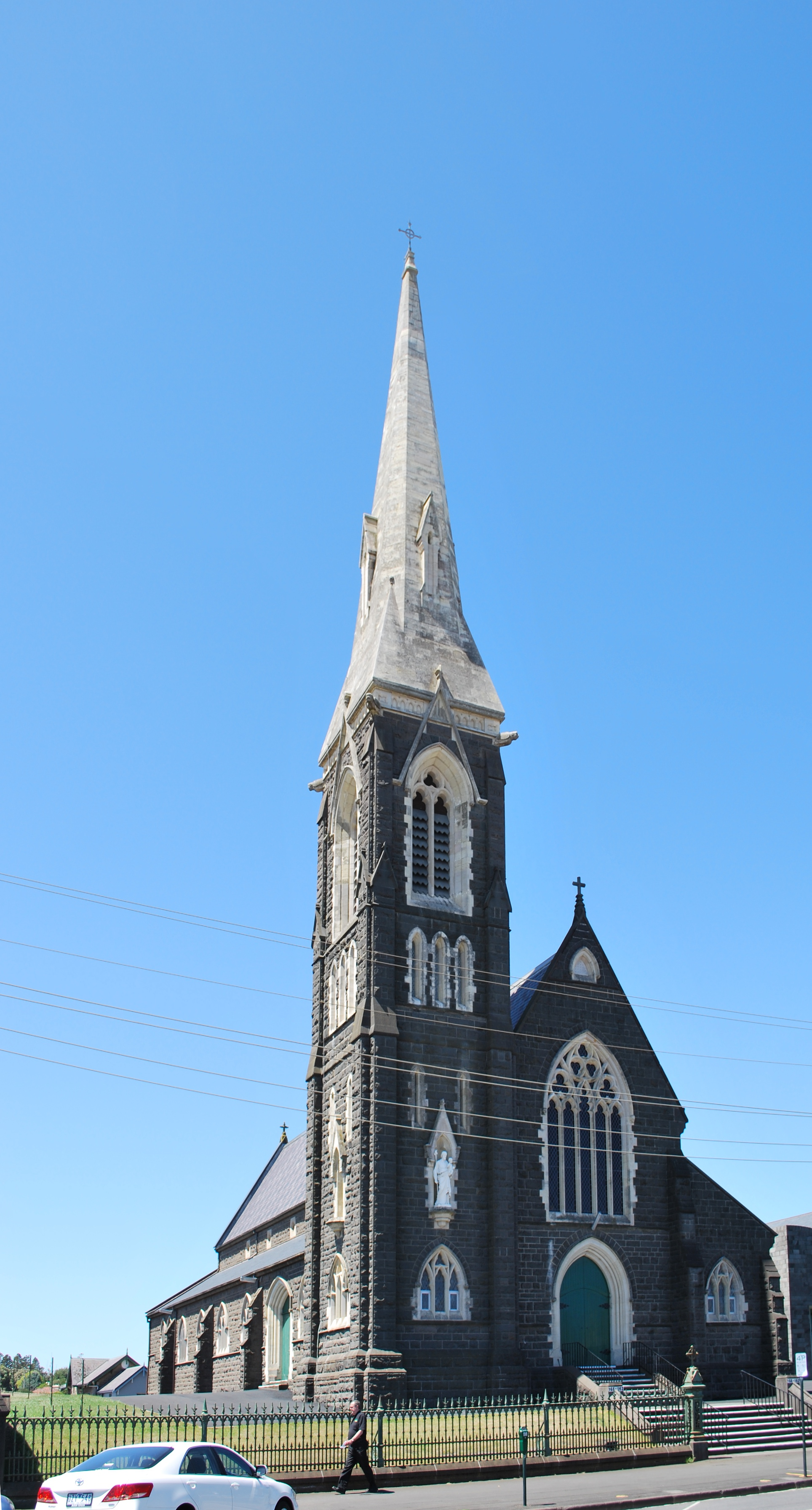
- View from Pickering Point Warrnambool Presbyterian Church Proudfoot's Boathouse Lady Bay (Warrnambool Beach) Warrnambool Hotel Flagstaff Hill Maritime Museum St Joseph's Catholic Church

- Coordinates: 38°22′57″S 142°28′53″E
- Country: Australia
- State: Victoria
- LGA: City of Warrnambool
- Location: 265 km (165 mi) SW of Melbourne; 114 km (71 mi) W of Colac; 115 km (71 mi) SE of Hamilton; 106 km (66 mi) E of Portland; 138 km (86 mi) S of Ararat
- Established: 1855

Government
  - State electorate: South-West Coast
  - Federal division: Wannon

Population
  - Total: 32,894 (2021 census)
- Time zone: UTC+10 (AEST)
  - Summer (DST): UTC+11 (AEST)
- Postcode: 3280
- Mean max temp: 17.9 °C (64.2 °F)
- Mean min temp: 9.6 °C (49.3 °F)
- Annual rainfall: 741.9 mm (29.21 in)

Warrnambool (/ˈwɔːrnəmbuːl/ WOR-nəm-BOOL; Maar: Peetoop or Wheringkernitch or Warrnambool) is a city on the south-western coast of Victoria, Australia. At the 2021 census, Warrnambool had a population of 32,894. Situated on the Princes Highway, Warrnambool (Allansford) marks the western end of the Great Ocean Road and the southern end of the Hopkins Highway.

== History ==
=== Origin of name ===
The name "Warrnambool" originated from Mount Warrnambool, a scoria cone volcano 25 kilometres northeast of the town. Warrnambool (or Warrnoobul) was the title of both the volcano and the clan of Aboriginal Australian people who lived there. In the local language, the prefix Warnn- designated home or hut, while the meaning of the suffix -ambool is now unknown. William Fowler Pickering, the colonial government surveyor who in 1845 was tasked with the initial planning of the township, chose to name the town Warrnambool. The traditional Indigenous owners of the land today are the Dhauwurd Wurrung people, also known as the Gunditjmara.

=== Aboriginal Australians ===
Aboriginal Australians are thought to have been occupying the site of Warrnambool for at least the last 35,000 years. The vicinity around the Merri River was inhabited by people known as the Merrigundidj, part of the larger Gunditjmara nation. They spoke a language called Bi:gwurrung, which was a dialect of the Dhauwurd Wurrung language. These people constructed large stone and timber weirs called yereroc across various waterways in the region in order to facilitate the trapping of eels. The area at the mouth of the Hopkins River was known as Moyjil. At the beginning of British colonisation of the region in 1841, there were approximately 400 Aboriginal people living around the coastal parts of the Merri River including a number of Koroitgundidj people residing in a village at what is now known as Tower Hill. There are several Maar placenames for locations in the area including: 'Kunang' referring to a waterhole on present-day Koroit Street which was a celebrated place for kangaroos to drink, 'Wirkneung' referring to the site of Warrnambool cemetery, 'Puurkar' referring to the Western Hill area of Warrnambool, and 'Peetoop' which is one of the names for the area meaning 'small sandpiper'.

=== European maritime exploration ===
A popular legend is that the first Europeans to visit the region were Cristóvão de Mendonça and his crew who surveyed the coastline nearby and were marooned near the site of the present town as early as the 16th century, based on the unverified reports of local whalers' discovery of the wreck of a mahogany ship. The ship's provenance has been variously attributed to France, China, Spain and Portugal. There is no physical evidence to suggest that it ever existed.

The first documented European exploration of the area occurred under Lieutenant James Grant, a Scottish explorer who sailed the Lady Nelson along the coast in December 1800 and named several features. This was followed by that of the English navigator Matthew Flinders in the Investigator, and the French explorer Nicholas Baudin, who recorded coastal landmarks, in 1802. The area was frequented by whalers early in the 19th century.

=== British settlement ===
British settlement of the land in the region began in 1838 when Captain Alexander Campbell, a whaler based at nearby Port Fairy, took possession of 4,000 acres around the mouth of the Merri River. He set up a farm there and built his main hut where Warrnambool now stands. The township was planned and surveyed in 1845, with the first allotments being sold in 1847. A Post Office opened on 1 January 1849.

During the Victorian Gold Rush, Warrnambool became an important port and grew quickly in the 1850s, benefiting from the private ownership of nearby Port Fairy. It was gazetted as a municipality in 1855, and became a borough in 1863. Warrnambool was declared a town in 1883, and a city in 1918. Post Offices opened at Warrnambool South in 1937 (closed 1973), Warrnambool East in 1946, and Warrnambool North in 1947 (closed 1975).

== Climate ==
Warrnambool has a temperate Mediterranean climate (Csb) that closely borders the Oceanic climate (Cfb), and is characterised by mild, dry summers with frequent cold fronts and cool, rainy winters with moderate cloud cover. Annual and especially winter rainfall is much higher than in Melbourne due to being west of the Otway Ranges.

During the 2026 heatwave in southeastern Australia, Warrnambool recorded a maximum temperature of 45.0 °C (113.0 °F) on 27 January 2026 at the airport site, while the highest minimum temperature remained 28.3 °C (82.9 °F) recorded on 21 January 1900 at the post office. Summers can also get cold on occasion, having dropped to 4.2 °C (39.6 °F) on 4 February 1963 near the beach.

Climate data for Warrnambool (Post Office, 1897–1983); 38.38° S, 142.48° E
Month	Jan	Feb	Mar	Apr	May	Jun	Jul	Aug	Sep	Oct	Nov	Dec	Year
Record high °C (°F)	44.4 (111.9)	43.9 (111.0)	40.0 (104.0)	34.4 (93.9)	30.7 (87.3)	23.1 (73.6)	22.5 (72.5)	24.0 (75.2)	34.4 (93.9)	33.8 (92.8)	38.9 (102.0)	42.5 (108.5)	44.4 (111.9)
Mean daily maximum °C (°F)	22.2 (72.0)	22.3 (72.1)	21.1 (70.0)	18.6 (65.5)	16.1 (61.0)	13.9 (57.0)	13.3 (55.9)	14.1 (57.4)	15.7 (60.3)	17.4 (63.3)	19.0 (66.2)	20.7 (69.3)	17.9 (64.2)
Mean daily minimum °C (°F)	12.8 (55.0)	13.3 (55.9)	12.3 (54.1)	10.4 (50.7)	8.7 (47.7)	6.9 (44.4)	6.2 (43.2)	6.7 (44.1)	7.7 (45.9)	9.0 (48.2)	10.1 (50.2)	11.6 (52.9)	9.6 (49.4)
Record low °C (°F)	5.6 (42.1)	4.2 (39.6)	3.7 (38.7)	1.7 (35.1)	−0.9 (30.4)	−0.6 (30.9)	−1.9 (28.6)	−1.6 (29.1)	1.1 (34.0)	1.0 (33.8)	1.7 (35.1)	4.2 (39.6)	−1.9 (28.6)
Average rainfall mm (inches)	32.9 (1.30)	34.3 (1.35)	47.6 (1.87)	60.3 (2.37)	77.5 (3.05)	76.9 (3.03)	88.3 (3.48)	85.6 (3.37)	73.7 (2.90)	66.7 (2.63)	54.8 (2.16)	44.4 (1.75)	741.9 (29.21)
Average rainy days (≥ 1.0 mm)	4.5	4.3	5.5	8.4	10.8	11.4	13.4	13.2	10.9	9.4	7.5	6.4	105.7
Source: Bureau of Meteorology

The airport is slightly north and inland of Warrnambool, featuring warmer days and cooler nights.

Climate data for Warrnambool Airport NDB (1998–2026); 38.29° S, 142.45° E
Month	Jan	Feb	Mar	Apr	May	Jun	Jul	Aug	Sep	Oct	Nov	Dec	Year
Record high °C (°F)	45.0 (113.0)	44.8 (112.6)	40.9 (105.6)	35.6 (96.1)	27.9 (82.2)	22.4 (72.3)	18.5 (65.3)	22.9 (73.2)	27.8 (82.0)	32.7 (90.9)	38.3 (100.9)	44.2 (111.6)	45.0 (113.0)
Mean daily maximum °C (°F)	24.7 (76.5)	24.7 (76.5)	23.1 (73.6)	19.9 (67.8)	16.5 (61.7)	14.1 (57.4)	13.5 (56.3)	14.4 (57.9)	16.1 (61.0)	18.1 (64.6)	20.5 (68.9)	22.6 (72.7)	19.0 (66.2)
Mean daily minimum °C (°F)	12.0 (53.6)	12.4 (54.3)	11.0 (51.8)	9.1 (48.4)	7.4 (45.3)	5.9 (42.6)	5.5 (41.9)	5.9 (42.6)	6.8 (44.2)	7.5 (45.5)	9.2 (48.6)	10.3 (50.5)	8.6 (47.4)
Record low °C (°F)	2.3 (36.1)	1.8 (35.2)	2.0 (35.6)	0.0 (32.0)	−1.7 (28.9)	−3.4 (25.9)	−2.4 (27.7)	−1.4 (29.5)	−1.7 (28.9)	−1.4 (29.5)	0.8 (33.4)	1.3 (34.3)	−3.4 (25.9)
Average precipitation mm (inches)	37.8 (1.49)	30.0 (1.18)	45.2 (1.78)	52.8 (2.08)	74.6 (2.94)	79.3 (3.12)	83.8 (3.30)	89.1 (3.51)	73.8 (2.91)	69.1 (2.72)	51.0 (2.01)	45.4 (1.79)	729.7 (28.73)
Average precipitation days (≥ 1.0 mm)	4.8	4.3	6.7	8.5	12.5	12.4	15.1	14.5	12.2	10.7	7.6	6.7	116.0
Source: Bureau of Meteorology

== Cityscape ==
The original City of Warrnambool was a 4x8 grid, with boundaries of Lava Street (north), Japan Street (east), Merri Street (south) and Henna Street (west). In the nineteenth century, it was intended that Fairy Street – with its proximity to the Warrnambool Railway Station – would be the main street of Warrnambool. However, Liebig Street has since become the main street of the central business district (CBD). The Warrnambool CBD is particularly notable for its number of roundabouts.

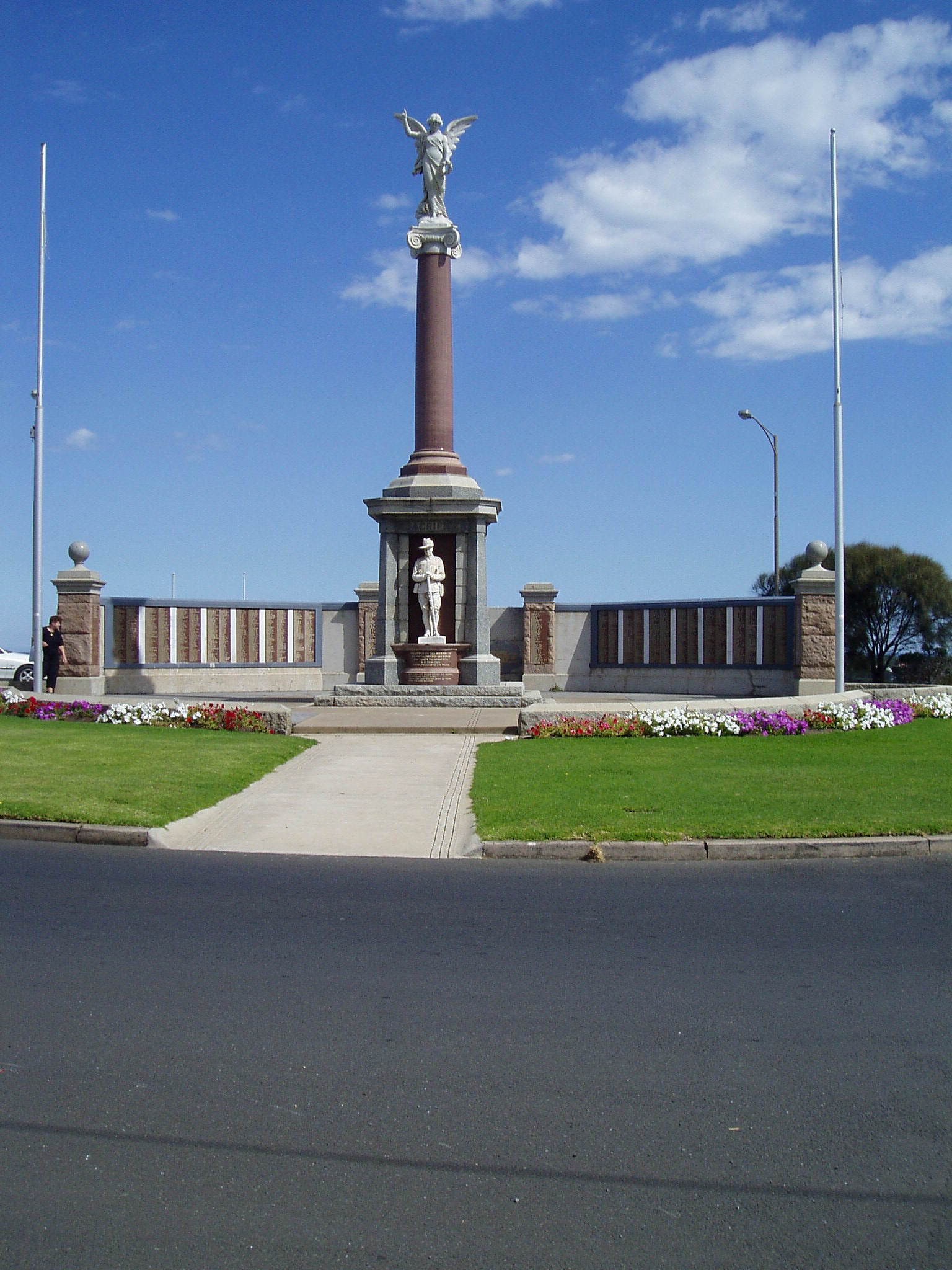
War Memorial, Warrnambool

Outside the CBD, the Warrnambool Botanic Gardens feature wide curving paths, rare trees, a lily pond with ducks, a fernery, a band rotunda, and was designed by notable landscape architect, William Guilfoyle.

Eleven suburbs surround the CBD of Warrnambool: North, South, East and West Warrnambool, Brierly, Sherwood Park, Merrivale, Dennington, Woodford, Bushfield and Allansford, though only the four latter are recognised as localities of the city.

== Culture ==
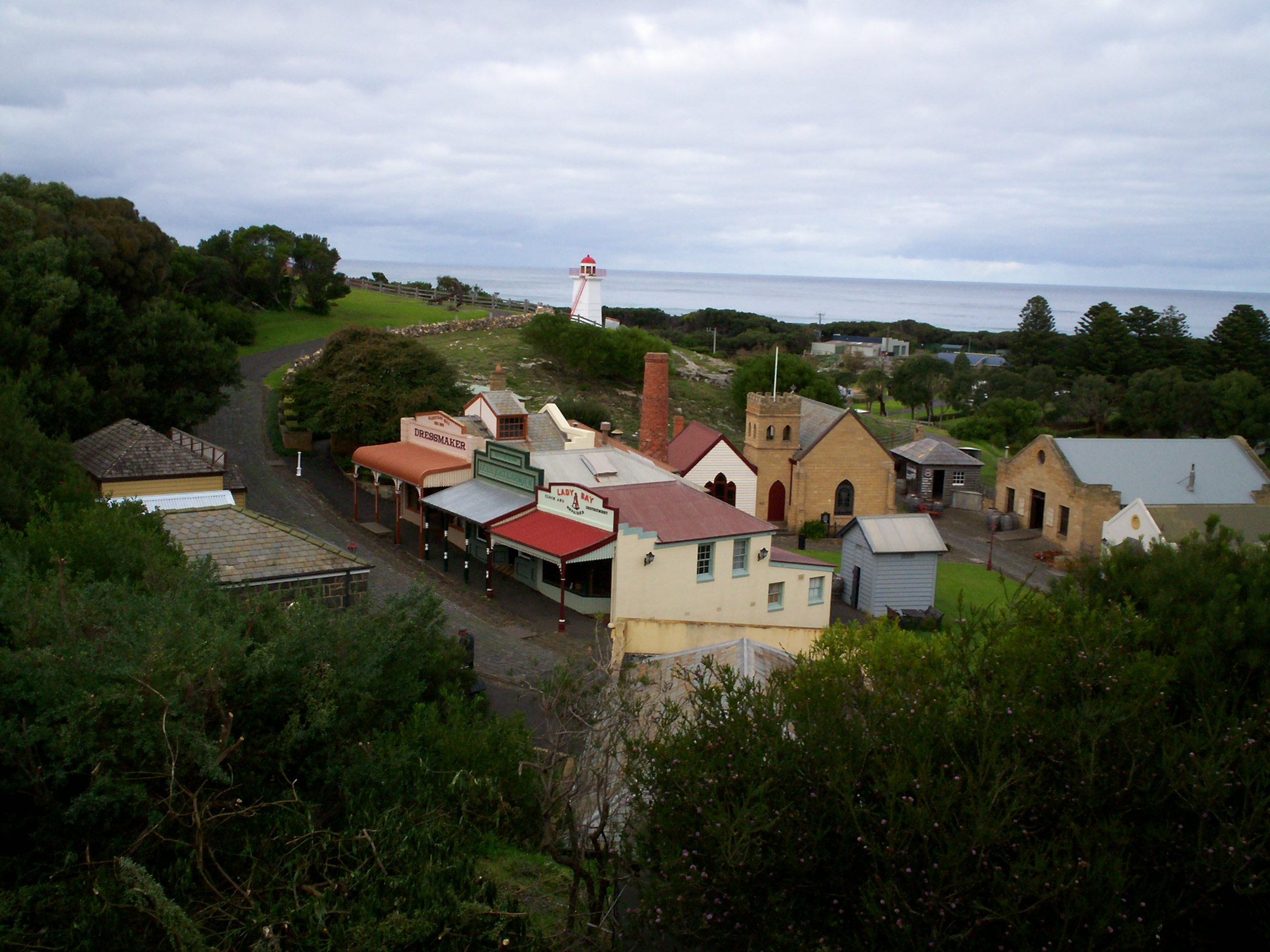
Overview of the Flagstaff Hill Maritime Museum

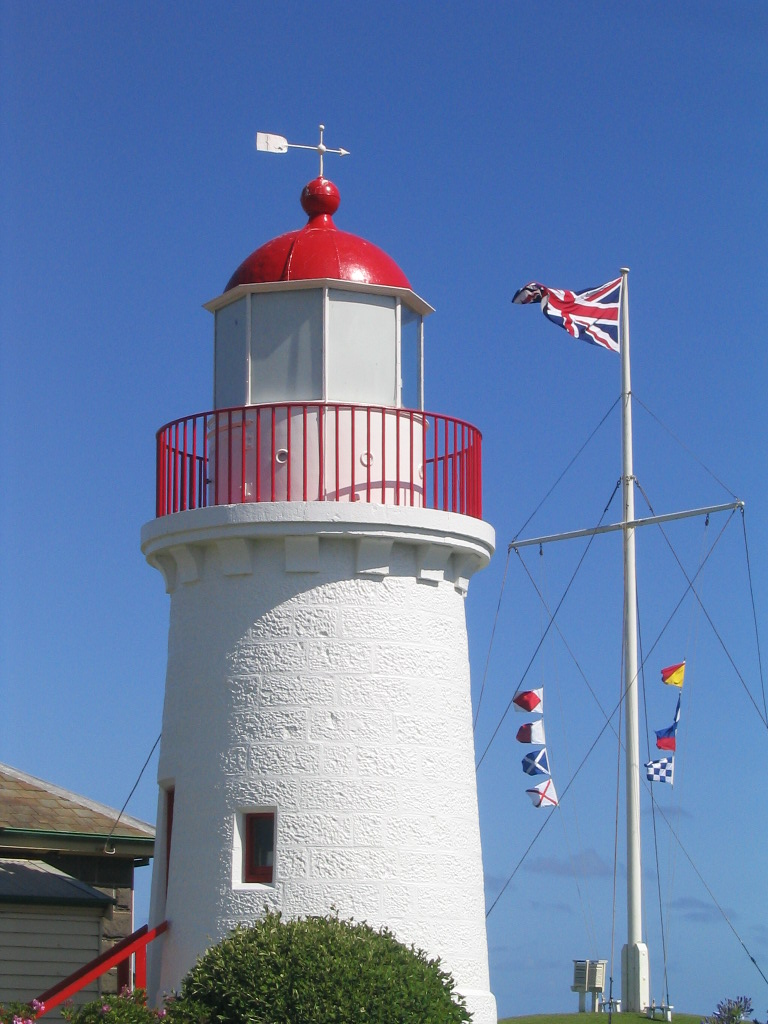
Lighthouse at the Maritime Museum

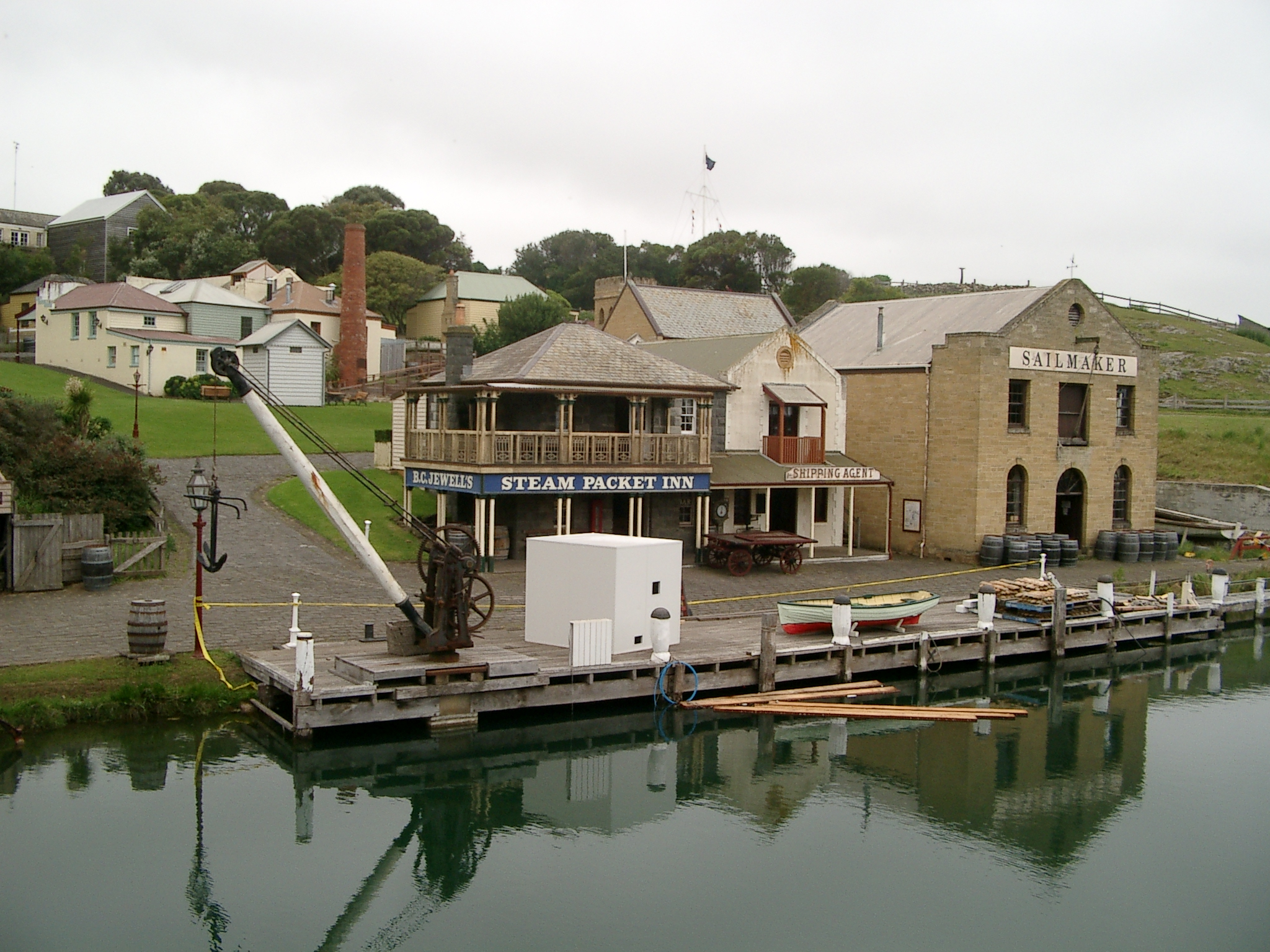
Looking up from the water at the Maritime Museum

Wunta Fiesta, a festival held in Warrnambool over the first weekend of February annually, is one of south-west Victoria's major community festivals. It incorporates a wide range of entertainment (mostly music) for all ages.

The Flagstaff Hill Maritime Museum is in Warrnambool built on Flagstaff Hill that also holds the original lighthouses and Warrnambool Garrison. Its most prized item in its collection is the Minton peacock salvaged from the Loch Ard. Flagstaff Hill Maritime Village is built around the original lighthouses and now operates as a heritage attraction and museum of shipwreck and maritime trade artefacts.

The Lady Bay Lighthouse complex is on the Victorian heritage register due to its significance as an example of early colonial development. There has been a flagstaff on top of Flagstaff Hill since 1848, and the current lighthouses were moved to the site in 1878. They still operate as navigation aids for the channel into Warrnambool harbour.

The Warrnambool foreshore is a popular swimming area, and is adjacent to the Lake Pertobe parklands. A number of caravan parks are also located in the area.

Baritone Robert Nicholson recorded the song Back to Warrnambool in 1924.

Warrnambool is the setting and filming location of the 2015 film Oddball, starring Shane Jacobson.

Warrnambool's Bathing History

Warrnambool has a rich history when it comes to outdoor bathing. The city has been a popular destination for beachgoers for 150 years, with the first public bathing area built in 1876 on the south end of Gilles Street, and was later moved to the current location with the advent of the railway. The sea baths were filled with water drawn from Lady Bay, initially by windmill and later by gas pump.

Over the years, Warrnambool' s outdoor bathing facilities evolved, with the introduction of new amenities and features. In 1881, the sought after Hot Sea Baths opened, and people travelled to Warrnambool to receive the benefits of bathing – noting their 'wonderful creative powers', and their being a 'tonic for the feeble'.

Today, Warrnambool continues to be a popular destination for bathing, with world class facilities available for locals and tourists alike. The Deep Blue Hot Springs offer two bathing experiences and, although no longer using salt water drawn from the sea, their Indoor Bath House and Outdoor Bathing Sanctuary offers naturally warm geothermal water, drawn from the Dilwyn Aquifer, 850 metres (930 yd) below the earth's surface.

=== Media ===
Warrnambool is served by one daily newspaper, The Standard, which is owned by Australian Community Media. The local commercial radio stations are 94.5 3YB and 95.3 Coast FM, both owned by Ace Radio. There is also a community radio channel, 3WAY FM. The ABC also owns a radio station, ABC South West Victoria, which is based in Warrnambool.

There is also the Warrnambool Weekly, a free weekly newspaper (produced by Western District Newspapers) that is supplied every Friday to several local businesses.

Warrnambool is also served by local transmission of free-to-air television networks (on relay from Ballarat) ABC, SBS, Seven, Network 10 and WIN.

Out of those networks, WIN Television produces the only local television news bulletin, WIN News, which uses resources from their Ballarat and Warrnambool newsrooms.

=== Sport ===
Warrnambool is home to the Grand Annual Sprintcar Classic, a race which attracts Australian and international drivers on the Australia Day long weekend, especially because of its position in the motorsport calendar.

The city is also the finishing point of the Melbourne to Warrnambool Classic cycle race. It is the longest one-day bicycle endurance race in the world, held every October since 1895 to be the world's second oldest bike race.

Warrnambool has a horse racing club, the Warrnambool Racing Club, which schedules around twenty race meetings a year including the Warrnambool Cup and Grand Annual Steeple three-day meeting in the first week of May. The Woodford Racing Club also holds one meeting at Warrnambool racecourse. The Grand Annual steeplechase has 33 jumps, more than any other horse race and is one of the longest steeplechases in the world.

The Warrnambool Greyhound Racing Club holds regular greyhound racing meetings on most Mondays and Thursdays. The Greyhound version of the Warrnambool Cup is held on the first Wednesday of May. The club also holds the Seaside Festival over the Christmas and New Year period providing great entertainment and value for money for both kids and kids at heart. The club is located centrally in the Warrnambool Showgrounds Precinct on Koroit Street and opened on 27 July 1978.

Warrnambool is home to the Premier Speedway, a 410-metre (450 yd) dirt track oval speedway located approximately 5 km east of the town. As well as hosting various Victorian state championships, Premier Speedway has hosted Australian championships for Sprintcars, Super Sedans and Street Stocks. Premier Speedway has also regularly hosted rounds of the World Series Sprintcars, being one of only five tracks to host a round of every series run since its inception in 1987. Since 1973 the speedway has been home to the Grand Annual Sprintcar Classic, the biggest single sprint car racing meeting in Australia, and on occasion has outdrawn the famed Knoxville Nationals in the United States for number of competitors entered, as better known drivers enter both races. The Classic is traditionally run the weekend before the national title meeting. The speedway has hosted the Classic / Australian Championship double on six occasions – 1979, 1986, 1994, 1999, 2003 and 2011, with Sydney's 10 time Australian Champion Garry Rush the only driver to win the double at Warrnambool in 1986 when he won his 6th Classic and a week later his 7th national title.

Gunditjmara Bulls and North Warrnambool Warriors play rugby league in NRL Victoria.

From 1 to 3 September 2008, the city hosted, along with Melbourne, the 2008 Australian Football International Cup, featuring 14 nations from around the world playing Australian rules football. The sport is highly popular in Warrnambool which has a competitive local league and is the origin of many high-profile AFL players. The city has three Australian Rules football teams playing in the Hampden Football League (North Warrnambool, South Warrnambool and Warrnambool), and many more in the Warrnambool District Football League

Golfers play either on the 18 hole course at the Warrnambool Golf Club a public access course ranked in Australia's top 100 courses, or at the 9 hole course at the Deakin University Warrnambool campus.

== Economy ==
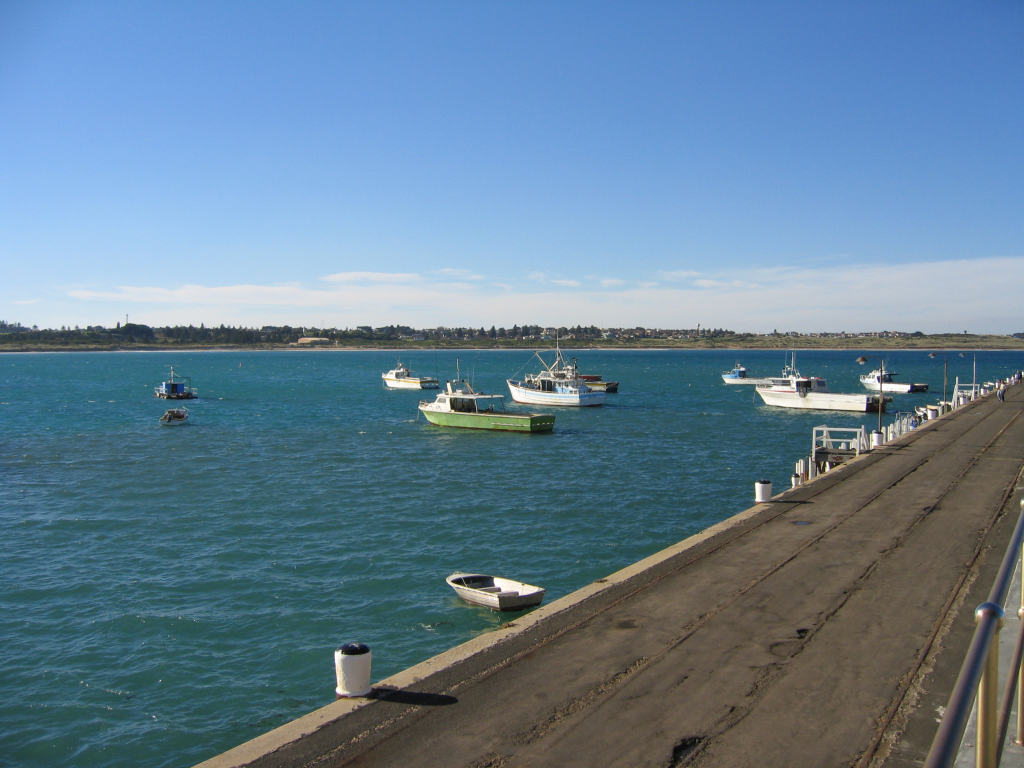
Warrnambool Harbour looking north from the breakwater

Warrnambool attracts many visitors each year, and is a comprehensive regional service centre. The town's tourism benefits from the views from the Great Ocean Road, and its nearby beaches, some of which are used for surfing. In the winter months, Southern Right whales can be seen in the waters near the city at the Logan's Beach nursery, and boats make whale-watching tours.

The mainstay of the economy is agriculture and its support industry – particularly dairy farming and associated milk processing. Other major industries and services include retail, education, health, meat processing, clothing manufacture and construction. The Fletcher Jones and Staff Pty Ltd clothing factory opened in 1948 and was closed in 2005.

== Demographics ==
15.1% of Warrnambool residents were born outside Australia, which is significantly less than the Australian average of 33.1%. 89.1% speak only English at home and 2.0% are Indigenous.

== Governance ==
The Local Government is the Warrnambool City Council.

At the state level, Warrnambool was within the electoral district of Warrnambool until it was abolished in 2002. Since then, Warrnambool has been in the South-West Coast electorate. This was held by former Premier Denis Napthine of the Liberal Party until his retirement in 2015, the resulting by-election electing Roma Britnell, also of the Liberal Party.

At the federal level, Warrnambool is the largest town in the division of Wannon, which has been a safe Liberal seat since 1955. However, Warrnambool booths typically receive a much stronger Labor vote than the rural areas that surround it. The seat was held by former Prime Minister Malcolm Fraser for 28 years, before being held by former Speaker of the lower house David Hawker for 27 years.

== Education ==
=== Primary ===
There are many primary schools in Warrnambool, including:

- Warrnambool Primary School
- Warrnambool East Primary School
- Warrnambool West Primary School
- Merrivale Primary School
- Allansford and District Primary School
- Grassmere Primary School
- Woodford Primary School
- Our Lady Help of Christians Primary School (Catholic)
- St Joseph's Primary School (Catholic)
- St Pius X Primary School (Catholic)
- St John's Primary School, Dennington (Catholic)
- Kings College (primary and secondary)
- Merri River School (formerly Warrnambool Special Development School) (primary and secondary)

=== Secondary ===
Warrnambool has two public high schools:

- Brauer College
- Warrnambool College

In addition, there is:

- Emmanuel College, a Catholic school
- King's College, a private Presbyterian school

=== Tertiary ===
The city's only university facilities are at the Deakin University Warrnambool campus. The South West Institute of TAFE and SEAL both provide vocational education.

== Environment ==
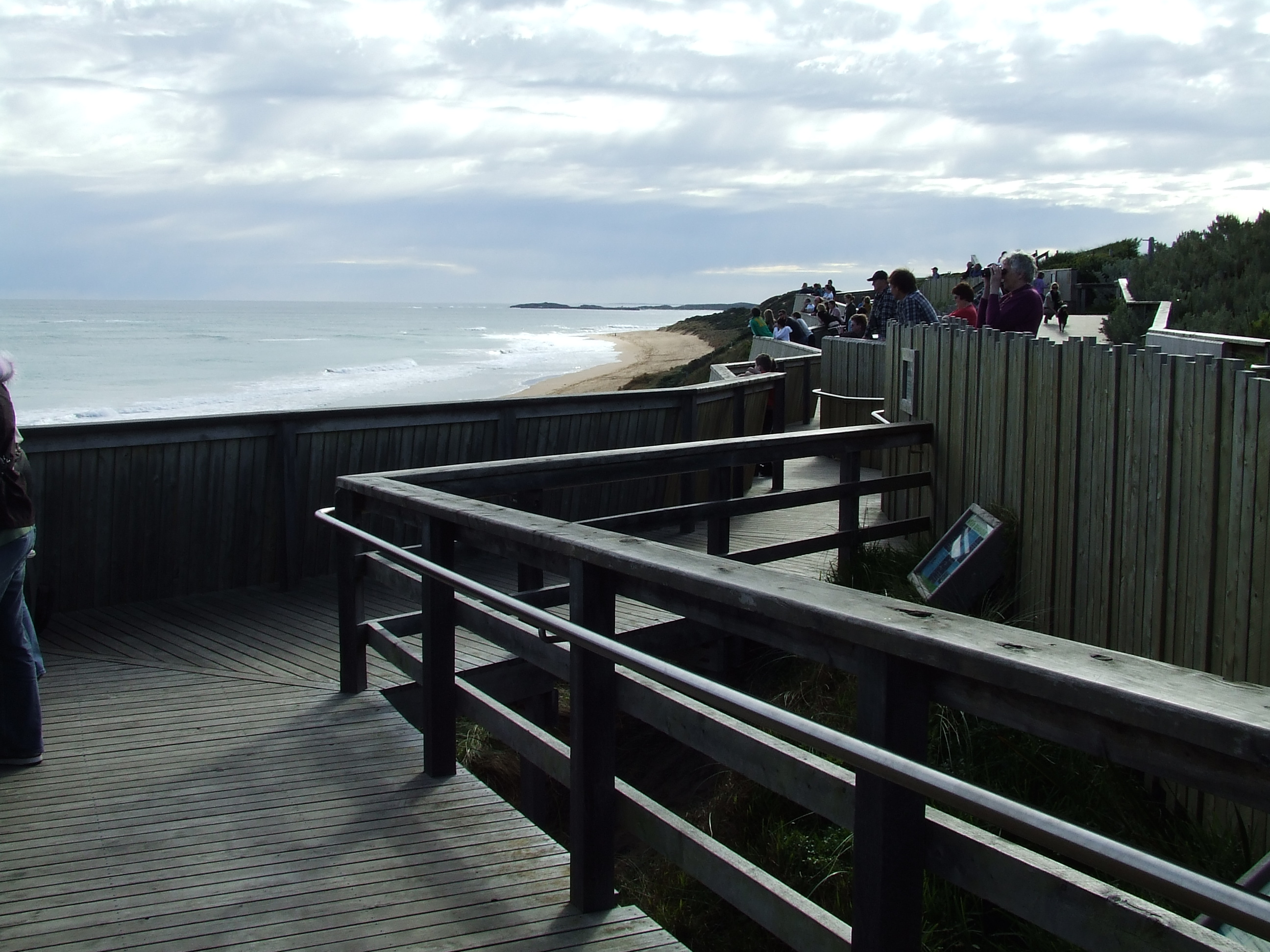
Whale watching stations situated on Logan Beach

Logan's Beach on the eastern side of the city is recognised as a nursery site for the southern right whale Eubalaena australis, and many tourists have been attracted to opportunities for land-based observations. Most years one, two or three adult female whales arrive between late May and August, giving birth within days of their arrival. The young whale calf is then reared at the site, usually departing with its parent by mid to late September. Besides the southern right whale, the coastline is also visited by Australian fur seals, little penguins and common dolphins. During the winter and early spring, albatross cruise along the coastline and can be sighted from Thunder Point, a popular coastal lookout in the town.

Middle Island has a colony of Australian little penguins (Eudyptula novaehollandiae). Fox predation reduced numbers significantly. In 2005, only four penguins were remaining in the colony. Warrnambool City Council introduced a world first program using Maremma dogs to guard the penguins. This program has supported the re-establishment of a colony of over one hundred penguins in 2009. By 2015 the population had reached almost two-hundred. The film Oddball is a dramatisation of the dogs saving the penguins.

== Transport ==
Warrnambool is situated on the Princes Highway between Port Fairy to the west and Terang to the east as well as at the south-western terminus of the Hopkins Highway. The Great Ocean Road terminates 13 km east of Warrnambool, near Allansford.

Rail services operate to Melbourne and Geelong. V/Line passenger train services call at Warrnambool's two stations, Warrnambool in the city and Sherwood Park in the city's outer east, seven days a week. A daily container freight service is being run by Pacific National for local container handler Westvic.

Local buses under the Transit South West brand cover Warrnambool's city and suburbs and extend to the nearby towns of Port Fairy and Koroit. V/Line coaches connect Warrnambool with Mount Gambier, Ballarat, Ararat, Casterton and the Great Ocean Road to Geelong.

== Health ==
There are two main hospitals in Warrnambool:

- Warrnambool Base Hospital, run by South West Healthcare, founded in 1854 as Warrnambool Hospital & Benevolent Asylum, with further name changes and mergers over the years, including a name change to Warrnambool and District Base Hospital in 1925 and Stage 1 of a A$115 million redevelopment opened in 2011 as Warrnambool Base Hospital.
- St John of God Warrnambool Hospital, a private hospital established in 1939 by the Sisters of St John of God and run by St John of God Health Care

== Notable people ==
- Airbourne, hard rock band
- Tom Ballard (b. 1989), comedian
- Ben Barber (b. 1984), actor
- Smoky Dawson (1913–2008), country music performer (born in Collingwood, raised in Warrnambool)
- Alex Dyson (b. 1988), radio presenter
- Sir John Eccles (1903–1997), Nobel Prize winner in physiology or medicine, 1963
- Brian Fitzpatrick (1905–1965), Australian economic historian
- Danielle Green, Member of Victorian Parliament was raised and educated in Warrnambool
- Dave Hughes (b. 1970), comedian
- Paul Jennings (b. 1943), children's author – (resides in Warrnambool)
- Sally Walker, Law Professor, Vice-Chancellor and President of Deakin University
- Axle Whitehead (b. 1980), musician and TV personality

=== Sportspeople ===
- Jonathan Brown (b. 1981), Leon Cameron (b. 1972), Paul Couch (1964–2016), Simon Hogan (b. 1988), Jordan Lewis (b. 1986), Brent Moloney (b. 1984), Noel Mugavin (b. 1956), Kevin Neale (1945–2023), Matt Maguire (b. 1984), Billie Smedts (b. 1992), Wayne Schwass (b. 1968), Michael Turner (1954–2024), Sam Dwyer (b. 1986), Martin Gleeson (b. 1994), John Burns (b. 1949), Australian rules football players
- Marc Leishman (b. 1983), golfer
- Christian Ryan (b. 1977), Olympic Silver Medallist, rowing 2000
- Nathan Sobey (b. 1990), basketball player
- Tim Ludeman, cricket player

== Sister cities ==
- Miura, Kanagawa, Japan
- Changchun, Jilin Province, P.R.China
- Knoxville, Iowa, United States of America

== See also ==
- ABC South West Victoria
- Lady Bay
- Mahogany Ship
- Warrnambool Airport
- Warrnambool V/Line rail service
