= Merri River =

River in Victoria, Australia

Merri
- Location of the Merri River mouth in Victoria
- Etymology: Aboriginal: meaning "rocky"

Location
- Country: Australia
- State: Victoria
- Region: Victorian Midlands (IBRA), Western District
- Local government area: Moyne Shire, Warrnambool
- Town: Warrnambool

Physical characteristics
- Source: Confluence of Spring Creek and Drysdale Creek
  - location: near Bushfield
  - coordinates: 38°16′52″S 142°32′22″E
  - elevation: 18 m (59 ft)
- Mouth: Stingray Bay, Southern Ocean
  - location: Pickering Point, near Warrnambool
  - coordinates: 38°24′4″S 142°28′15″E
  - elevation: 0 m (0 ft)
- Length: 31 km (19 mi)

Basin features
- River system: Glenelg Hopkins catchment
- Tributaries
  - left: Russell Creek (Victoria), Sawpit Creek

The Merri River, a perennial river of the Glenelg Hopkins catchment, is located in the Western District of Victoria, Australia.

== Course and features ==
Formed by the confluence of the Spring Creek and Drysdale Creek, to the east of Grassmere. It flows generally south joined by two minor tributaries before reaching its mouth and emptying into Stingray Bay, part of the Southern Ocean, near the city of Warrnambool. The river descends 18 metres (59 ft) over its 31-kilometre (19 mi) course. Spring Creek starts to the east of Penshurst, just north of the Hamilton Highway while Drysdale Creek starts near the Woolsthorpe-Hexham Road.

== Etymology ==
The river derives its name from an Aboriginal word meaning "rocky".

== See also ==
- List of rivers in Victoria
- Merri Island
- Middle Island (Warrnambool)
