= Middle Island (Warrnambool) =

Island in Victoria, Australia

Coordinates: 38°24′13″S 142°28′19″E

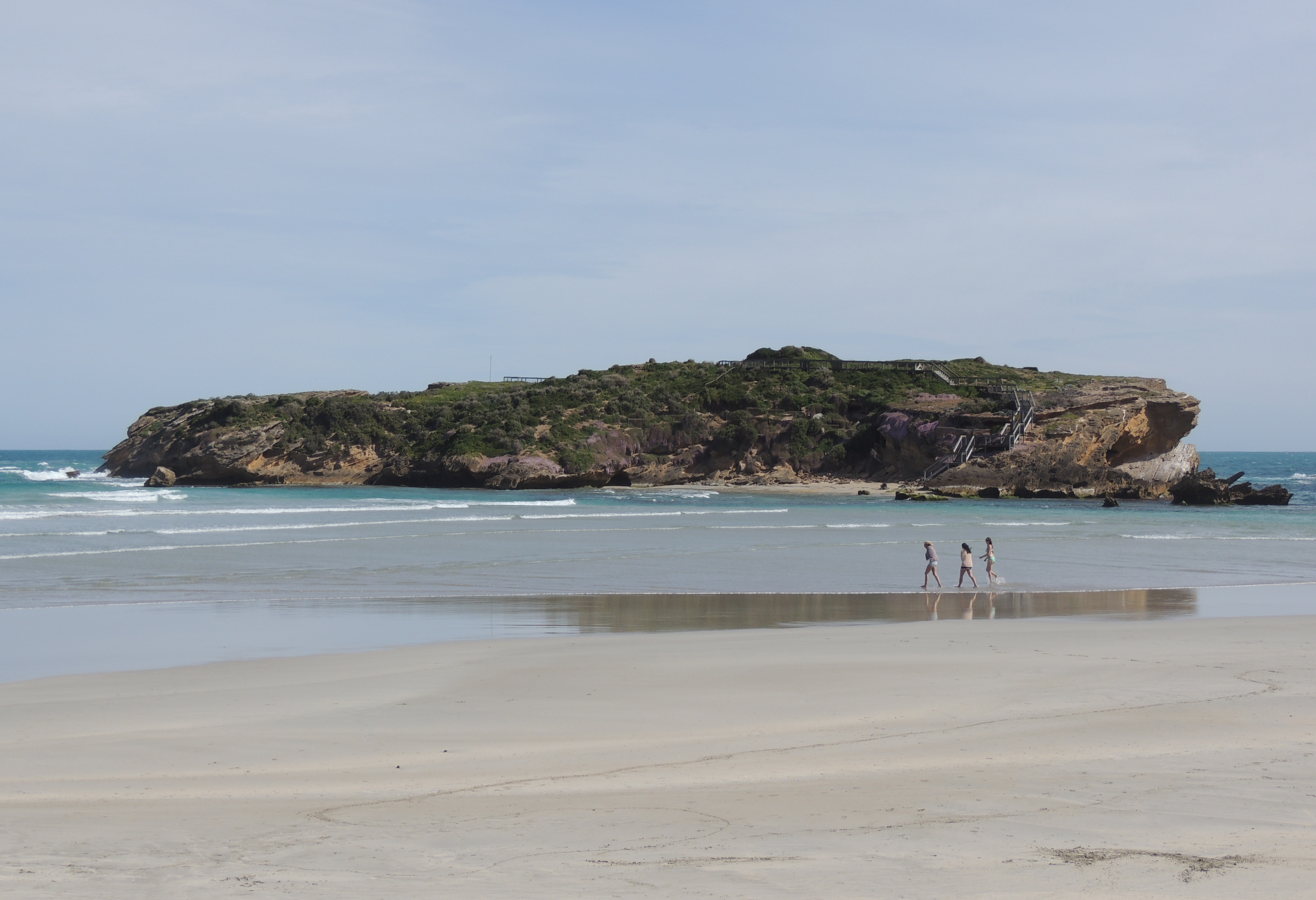
Middle Island in 2014

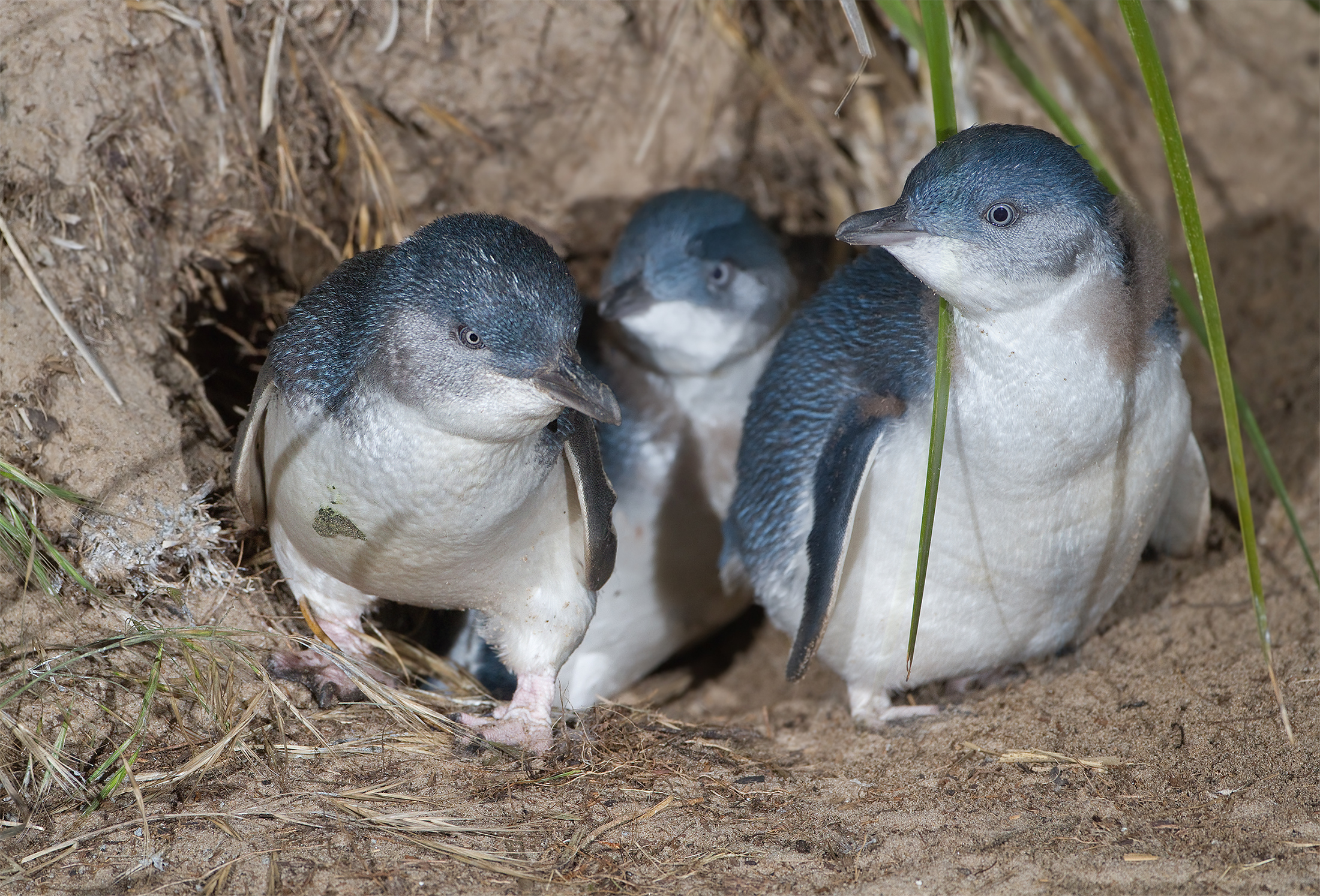
The island has a breeding colony of Australian little penguins.

Middle Island is a small (c. 2 ha), rocky island lying close to the shore of south-western Victoria, Australia, in Stingray Bay next to the city of Warrnambool. It is a wildlife sanctuary that is home to breeding colonies of Australian little penguins (Eudyptula novaehollandiae) and short-tailed shearwaters (Ardenna tenuirostris). It is closed to general public access because of the low penguin population.

== Maremma Project ==
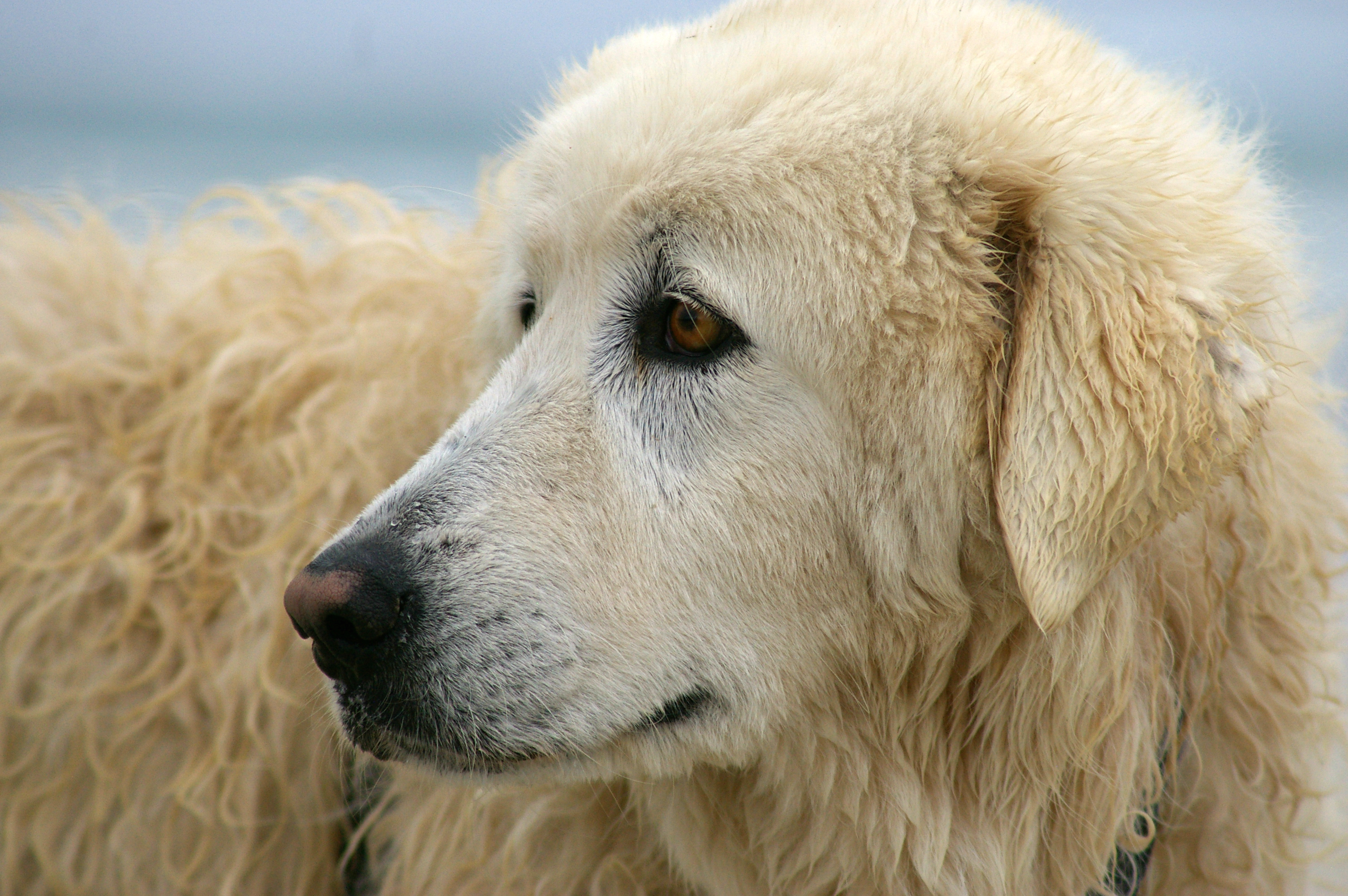
The Maremma Project uses Maremma Sheepdogs to protect the penguins from foxes.

Because of the proximity of the island to the coast, it is accessible at low tide to predators such as foxes (Vulpes vulpes) and stray dogs. As a result, the penguin colony declined to a low of ten breeding pairs by 2005. In 2006 an attempt began to protect the birds from foxes by the use of Maremma Sheepdogs trained to protect penguins rather than sheep and to act as a deterrent to foxes. The dogs, who work in pairs, spend five or six days a week on the island during the breeding season from October to March. Since then the penguin population has been increasing and by 2016 had reached nearly two hundred. In 2017, when high tides and bad weather prevented the dogs from being taken to the island, as many as 140 penguins were killed by foxes. Numbers have since rebounded, and the project inspired a similar effort that began in late 2020 to protect newly released eastern barred bandicoots at Werribee Open Range Zoo by having the dogs mind a flock of sheep.

In 2021, Eudy, the first Maremma specifically trained to protect the penguins died of bone cancer; she was buried on the island.

== Culture ==
The 2015 film Oddball is about the Penguin Preservation Project.
