= Flagstaff Hill Maritime Village =

Coordinates: 38.38947°S 142.48499°E

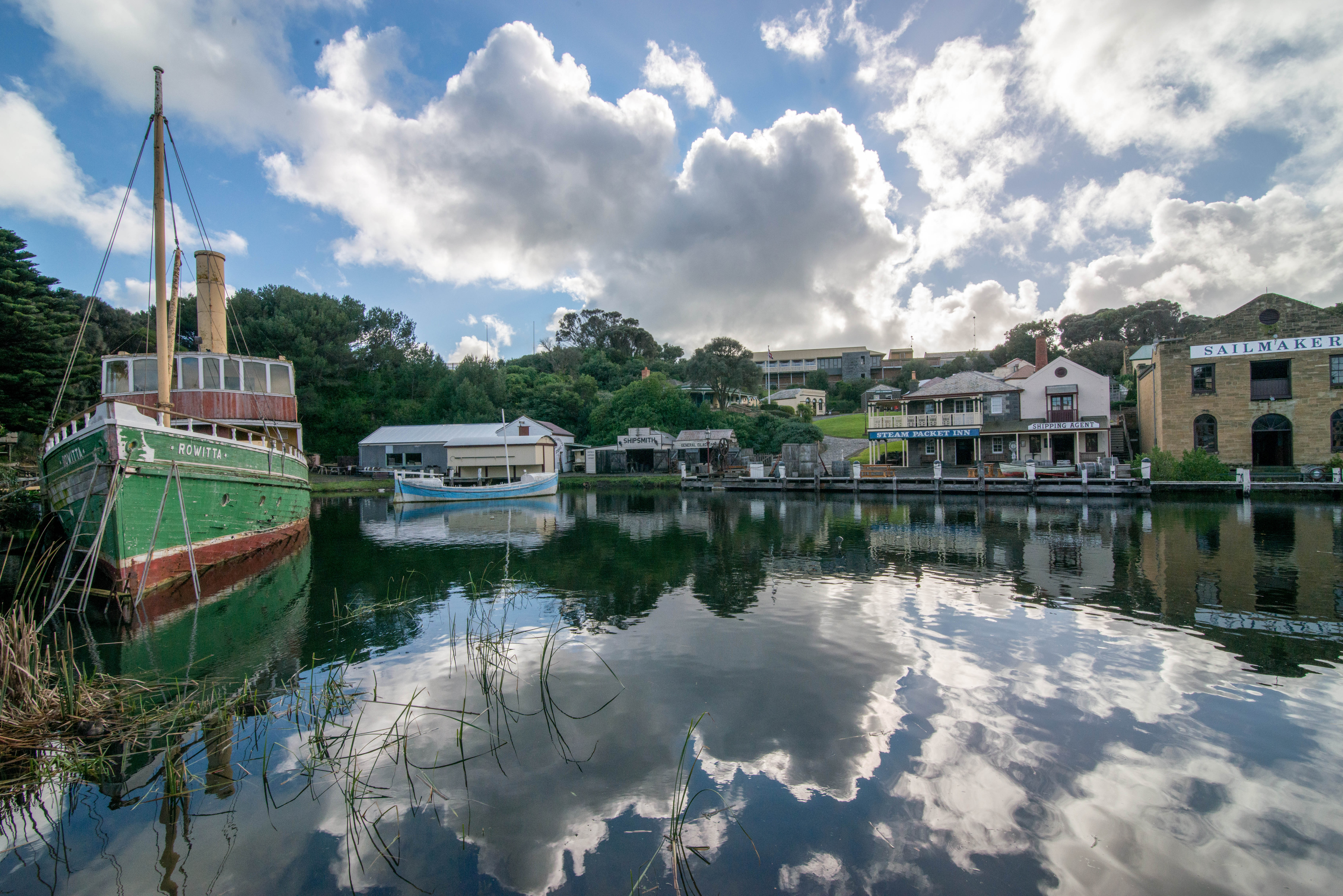
The 1870s Flagstaff Hill Maritime Village museum

Flagstaff Hill Maritime Village is located in Warrnambool, a regional city on the south-western coast of Victoria, Australia. The museum is built on Flagstaff Hill that also holds the original lighthouses and Warrnambool Garrison.

The museum is laid out like an 1870s period village with costumed tradesmen and interpreters. The museum features a large collection of items from shipwrecks, including a Minton peacock salvaged from the Loch Ard.
