= Maremmano-Abruzzese Sheepdog =

Italian breed of livestock guardian dog

Maremma-Abruzzese Sheepdog
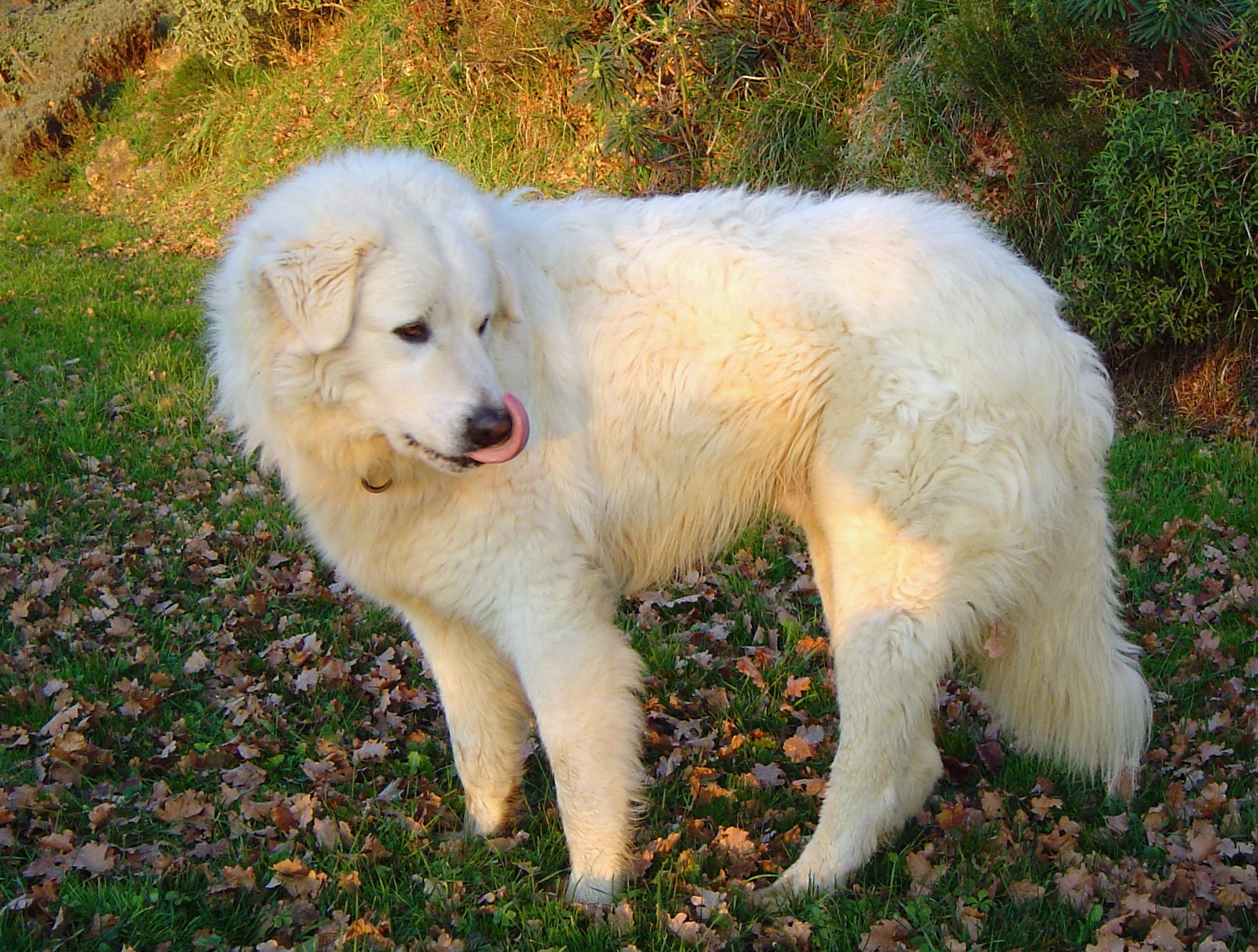
- Other names: Cane da Pastore Maremmano-Abruzzese; Maremmano; Pastore Abruzzese; Pastore Maremmano; Abruzzese Mastiff; Mastino Abruzzese; Abruzzo Sheepdog; Abruzzese Sheepdog; Cane da Pastore Abruzzese; Maremma Sheepdog; Maremmano Sheepdog; Abruzzese Shepherd
- Origin: Italy
Traits
Height	Males	65–73 cm (26–29 in)
	Females	60–68 cm (24–27 in)
Weight	Males	35–45 kg (75–100 lb)
	Females	30–40 kg (65–90 lb)
- Coat: long, thick
- Colour: white
Kennel club standards
- Ente Nazionale della Cinofilia Italiana: standard
- Fédération Cynologique Internationale: standard

The Maremmano-Abruzzese Sheepdog (Italian: Cane da Pastore Maremmano-Abruzzese (Note: also known by many other names, among them Maremmano, Maremma Sheepdog, Abruzzese Sheepdog and Pastore Abruzzese)) is an Italian breed of livestock guardian dog. It is indigenous to central Italy, especially to the Maremma region of Tuscany and Lazio, and to northern areas of Southern Italy, particularly to Abruzzo. It has been used for centuries by Italian shepherds to guard sheep from wolves. The "Maremmano" name derives from that of the Maremma marshlands where, until recently, shepherds, dogs and hundreds of thousands of sheep over-wintered, and where the dogs are still abundant although sheep-farming has decreased substantially. However, the breed is still widely employed in and closely culturally associated with the nearby region of Abruzzo, where sheep herding remains vital to the rural economy and where the wolf (specifically the Apennine wolf) remains an active and protected predator. The "Abruzzese" portion of the dog's name derives from its ubiquity in Abruzzo and the surrounding area.

It may share a common ancestor with other European breeds of similar appearance and function such as the Pyrenean Mountain Dog, the Kuvasz of Hungary, the Polish Tatra Sheepdog and the Šarplaninac.

== History ==
=== Ancient history and iconography ===
Descriptions of white flock guardian dogs are found in ancient Roman literature, in works such as those of Columella, Varro and Palladius. Similar dogs are depicted in numerous sculptures and paintings from Roman times to the present. Among the earliest is the series of large statues (two in Rome, one in Florence, one – the Duncombe Dog – in England) copied from a Hellenistic bronze from Pergamon.

Iconographic sources identified as relevant to the history of the Maremmano include:

- A Hellenistic bas-relief, of which a drawing was published by Max von Stephanitz in 1901
- A votive statuette in the Museo Archeologico of Capua
- A fourteenth-century mediaeval fresco in the church of San Francesco in Amatrice, at the foot of the Monti della Laga, in the comune of Rieti; the dog wears a roccale
- A fourteenth-century fresco in Santa Maria Novella, in Florence
- A 'Nativity' of Mariotto di Nardo (active 1394–1424); the dog wears a spiked collar
- Abraham and Lot on their way into Canaan by Bartolo Battiloro, in the Collegiata of San Gimignano
- A detail of the Journey of the Magi to Bethlehem by Benozzo Gozzoli, c.1460
- Rough ink drawings on the maps of the pasture-lands of the Tavoliere di Foggia published in 1686 by Antonio and Nunzio Michele di Rovere
- A seventeenth-century engraving of the Roman campagna by Joannes van den Hecke
- An eighteenth-century maiolica of a bear-hunt by Candeloro Cappelletti (1689–1772) of Castelli, Abruzzo
- Hunting the Wolf by Jean-Baptiste Oudry, 1746, from the collection of Louis XV; the dogs to the left and right of the wolf are described in a catalogue of the museum as "large dog[s] with long hair". Wolf dogs from the Abruzzo were imported into France at about this time. They were used by François Antoine, "Antoine de Beauterne", in his successful hunt for the Beast of Gévaudan in 1765; according to Gobin, under Louis XV (r.1715–1774) the Venerie Royale or Royal Hunt was composed in large part of Abruzzese wolf-dogs and Sicilian mastiffs.
- The cane da lupo or wolf-dog used by Vincenzo Dandolo to defend Spanish sheep on the mountains above Varese
- An illustration in The Penny Magazine (1833)
- An engraving by Arthur John Strutt of a shepherd and his dog in the Roman campagna in 1843
- Several engravings by Charles Coleman in his collection A Series of Subjects peculiar to the Campagna of Rome and Pontine Marshes
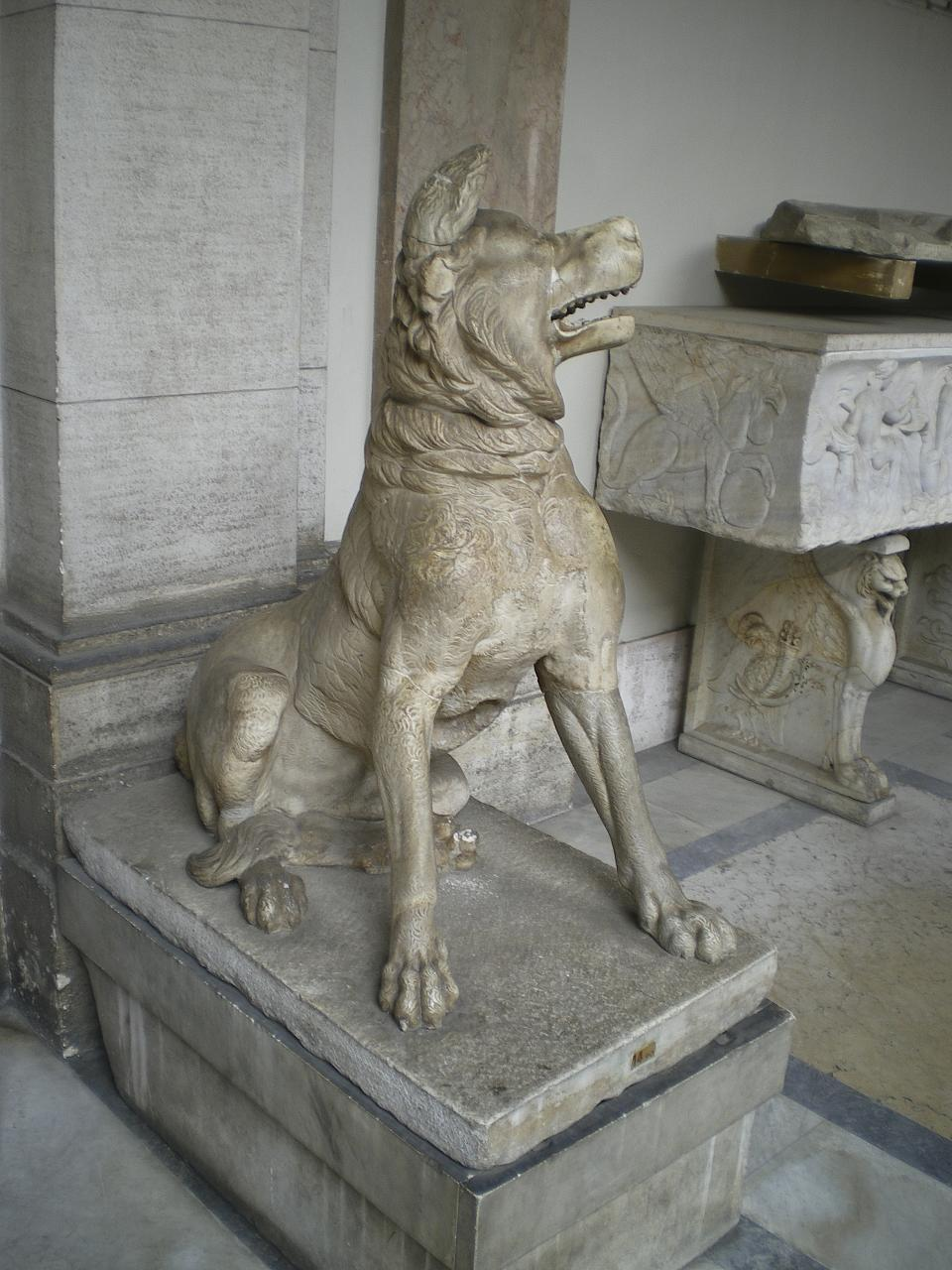
Roman copy of a Hellenistic bronze, in the Vatican Museums

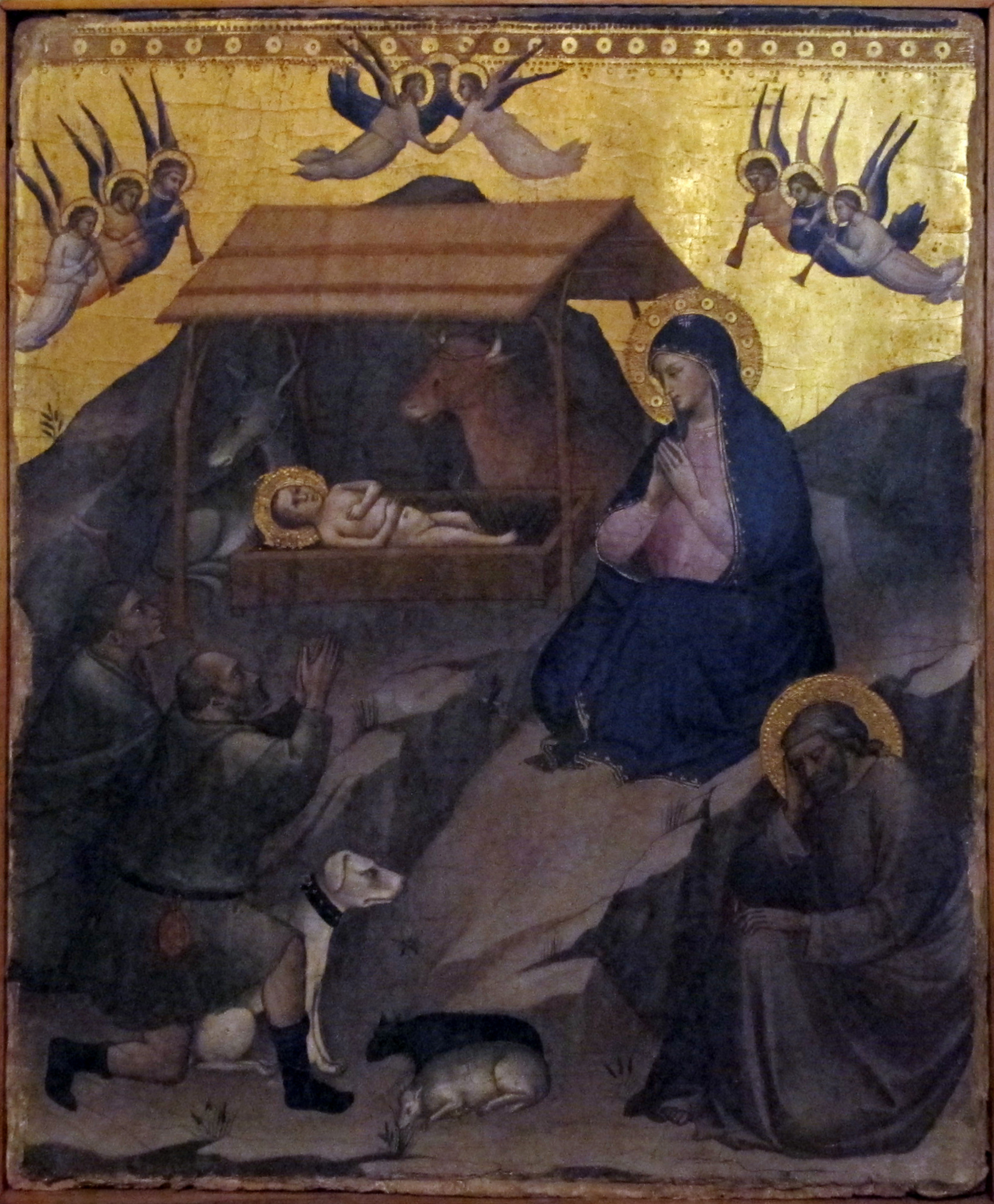
Mariotto di Nardo, Natività, ca. 1385, showing a white shepherd dog with a spiked collar

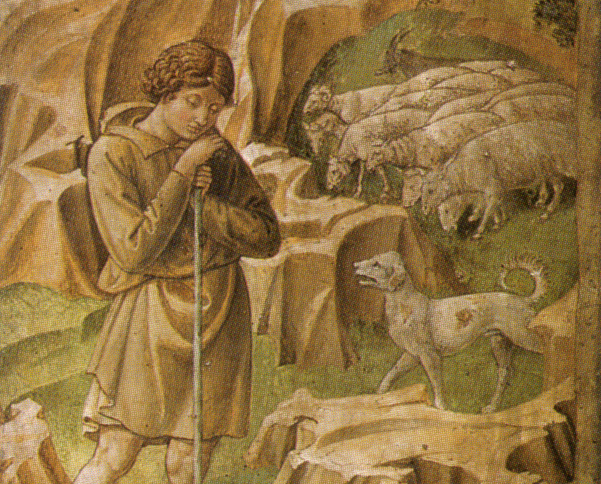
Detail of the Journey of the Magi to Bethlehem by Benozzo Gozzoli

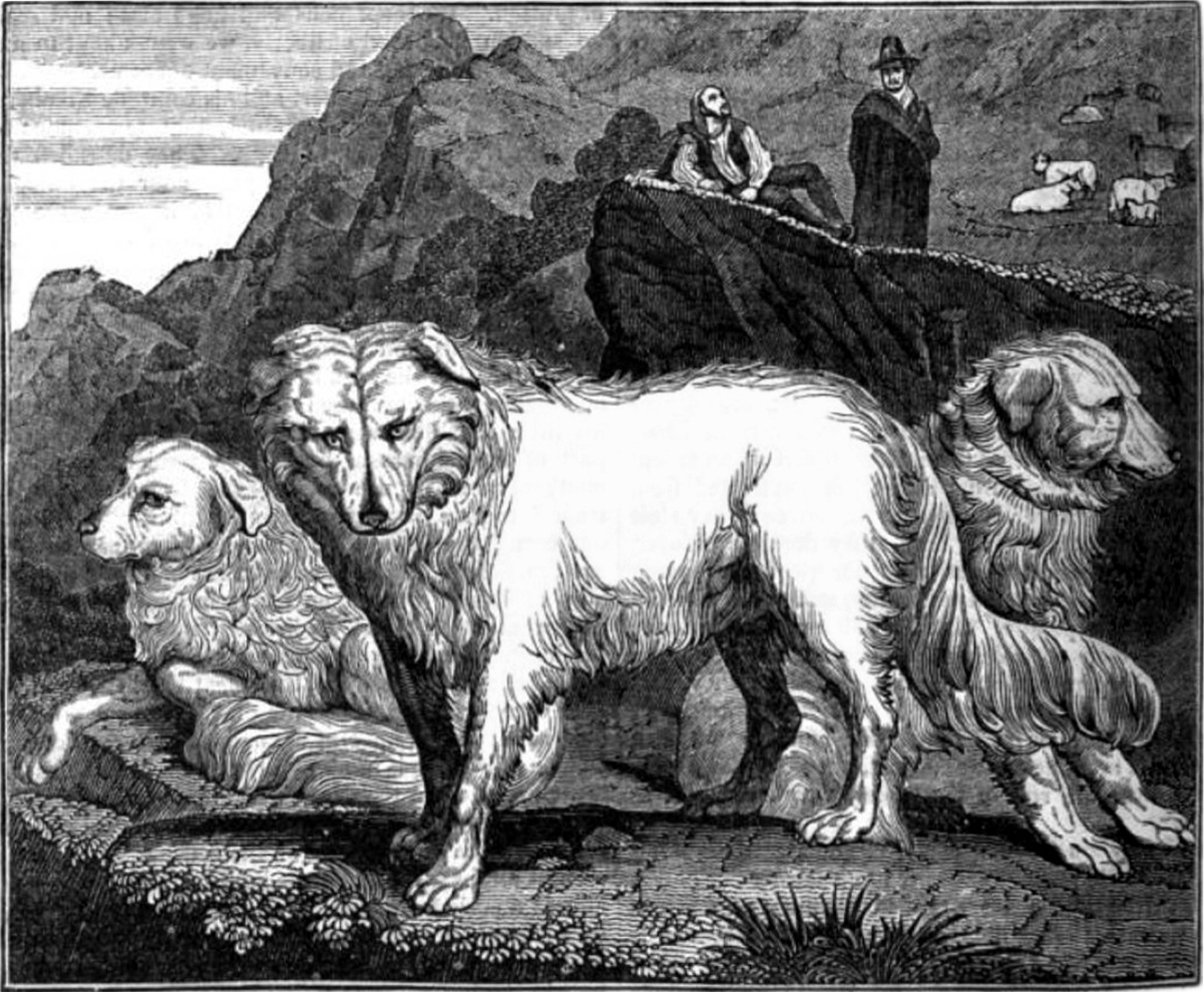
"Wolf dogs of the Abruzzi", illustration from The Penny Magazine of 1833

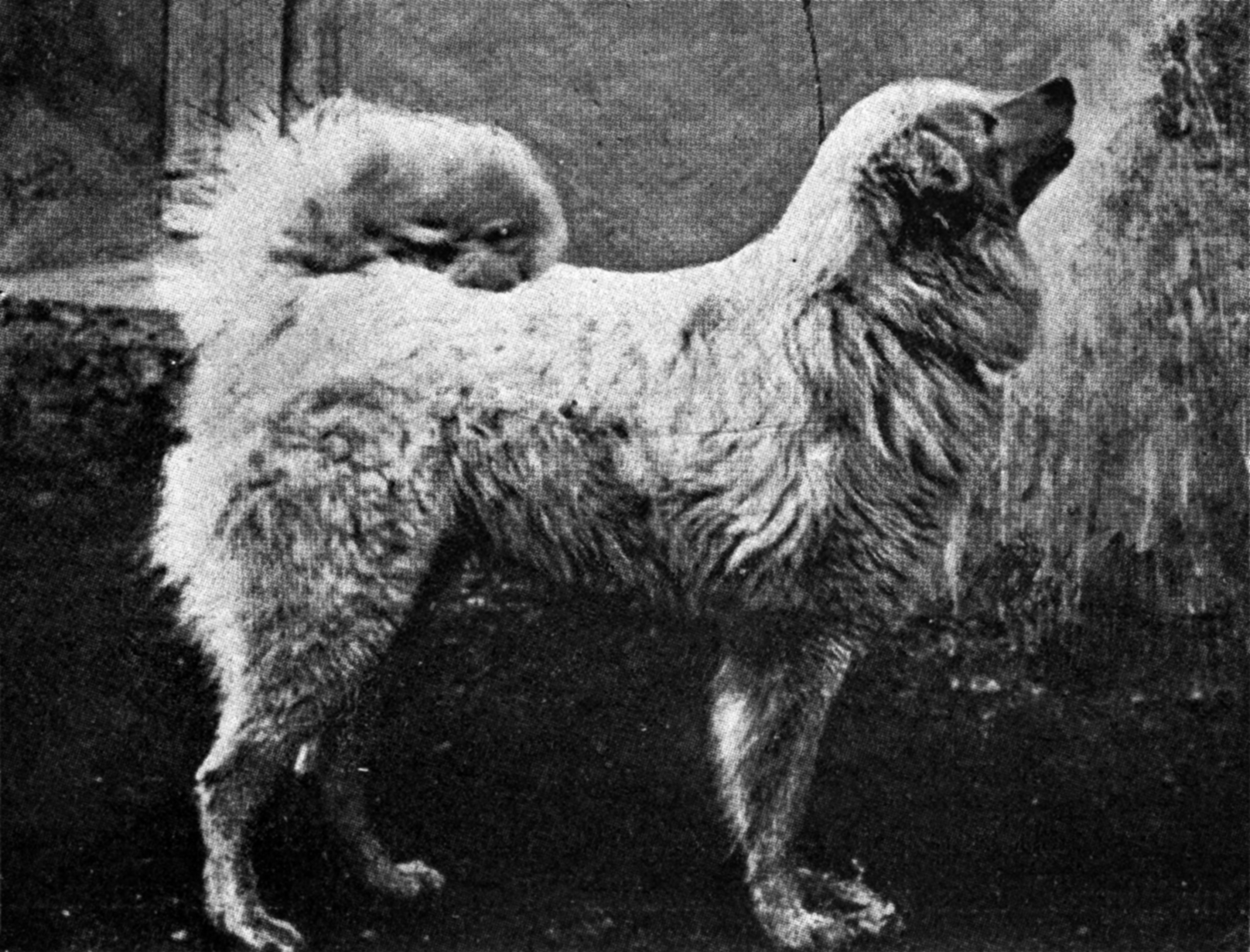
Sheepdog of the Abruzzes (about 1915)

=== Recent history ===
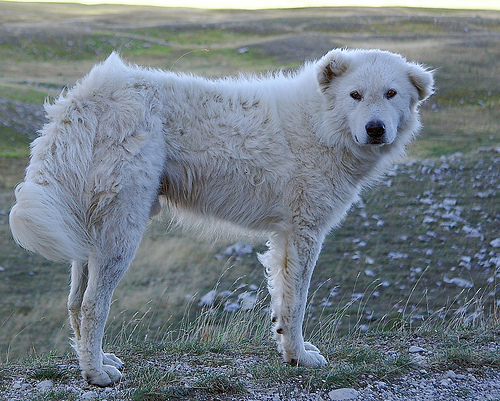
A working dog on the Gran Sasso of Abruzzo

The first registration of the Maremmano in the Libro delle Origini Italiano of the Kennel Club Italiano, as it was then called, was of four dogs in 1898. There were no further registrations for many years. In 1940 there were 17 dogs registered. The first standard for the breed was drawn up in 1924 by Luigi Groppi and Giuseppe Solaro.

Until 1958 the Pastore Maremmano, or shepherd dog of the Maremma, and the Pastore Abruzzese, or shepherd dog of the Abruzzi, were regarded as separate breeds. A breeder's society for the Pastore Abruzzese was formed in 1950, and one for the Maremmano in 1953. On 1 January 1958 the breeds were unified by the ENCI, the Ente Nazionale della Cinofilia Italiano, the national dog association of Italy. The explanation given is that a "natural fusion" of the two types had occurred as a result of movement of the dogs due to transhumance of sheep flocks from one region to another, particularly after the unification of Italy. Until 1860, the mountains of the Abruzzo and the plains of the Maremma lay in different countries. While some older publications refer to the Maremmano and Abruzzese as independent breeds combined to create the Maremmano-Abruzzese, it has been noted that the shorter-haired Maremmano was only ever observed during the winter months, when flocks were grazed on their winter pastures on the milder coastal Tuscany, whilst the supposedly longer-bodied Abruzzese was only observed in the summer months, when flocks were grazed in the Abruzzi mountains.

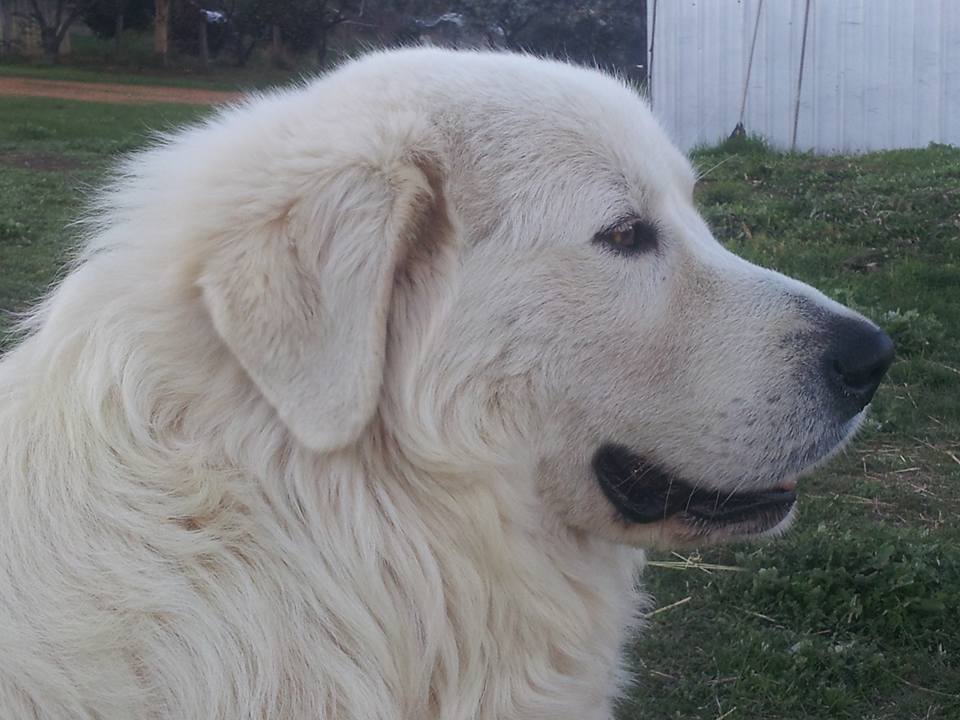
The nose, lips and eye surrounds are black.

As sheep farming developed into an annual trek or transhumance from mountain grasslands of Abruzzo and Molise (and other parts of central Italy) south to lower pasture land in Puglia, where sheep were over-wintered, the dogs came to play a central role in the centuries-old migration, an annual event vital to Abruzzese culture. Maremmano dogs continue to be widely used by Italian sheep farmers in areas where predation is common, such as the Apennines of central Italy and the open range land of national parks in Abruzzo. The dogs have also been used to guard animals in Australia, Israel, New Zealand and the United States.

== Characteristics ==
The Maremmano has a solid, muscular build, a thick white coat, a large head and a black nose. Dogs weigh some 35–45 kg (75–100 lb) and stand 65–73 cm (26–29 in) at the shoulder, while bitches weigh 30–40 kg (65–90 lb) and stand 60–68 cm (24–27 in). Some dogs may be considerably larger. The coat is long and thick; it is rough to the touch, and forms a thick collar around the neck. It should be solid white; some minor yellowing may be tolerated. The nose, the lips and the skin round the eyes are black.

The median age at death has been reported as 7.5 years, compared to a median of 10 years for all dogs in Italy.

== Use ==
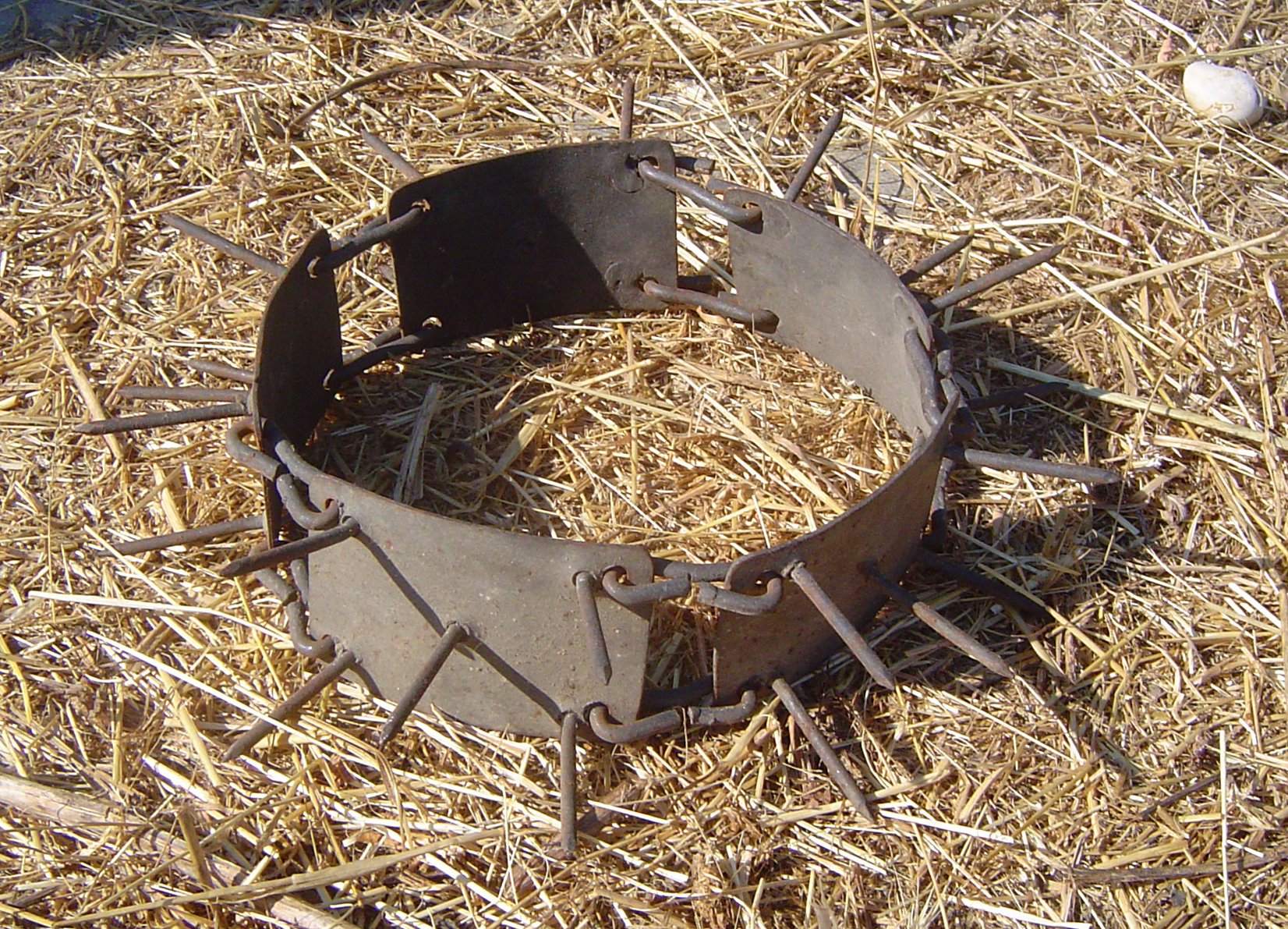
A roccale of a different type

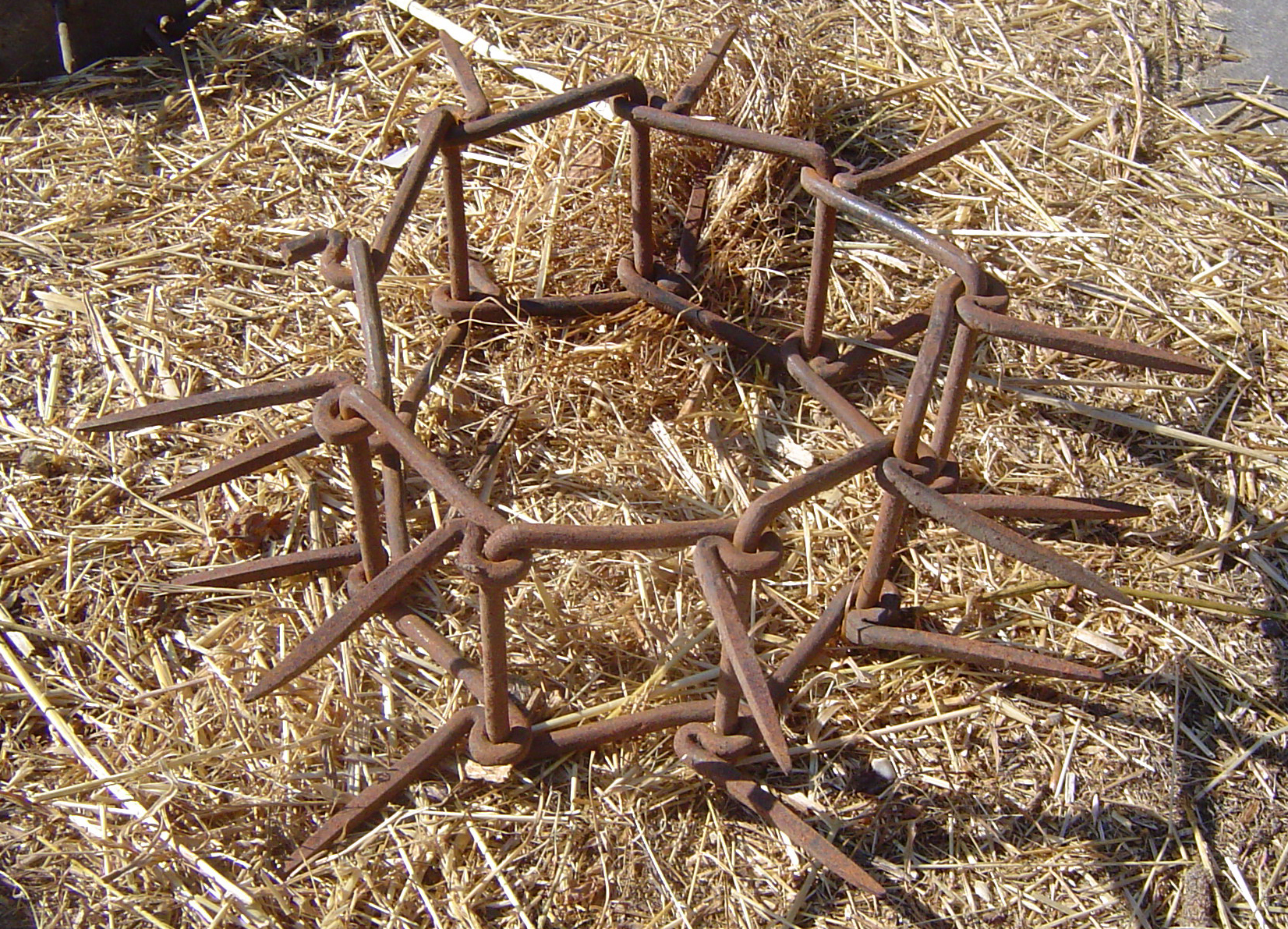
The roccale or vreccale, a spiked iron collar

The traditional use of the Maremmano is as a guardian for the protection of sheep flocks against wolves. Columella, writing in the first century AD, recommends white dogs for this purpose, as the shepherd can easily distinguish them from the wolf, while Varro suggests that white dogs have a "lion-like aspect" in the dark. The dogs work in groups; three or four dogs are an adequate defense against wolves and stray dogs. Their function is mostly one of dissuasion, actual physical combat with the predator being relatively rare. Nevertheless, working dogs may be fitted with a roccale (or vreccale), a spiked iron collar which protects the neck in combat. Until cropping became illegal in Italy, the ears of working dogs were normally cropped.

Dogs used for flock protection are placed among the sheep as young puppies – no more than 40 days old – so that they bond with them; human contact is kept to the indispensable minimum. If there are already guardian dogs in the flock, the puppy imitates and learns from their behaviour. The traditional use of the Maremmano is with sheep, but the dogs can form a similar bond with cattle and have been used to protect them. A small number have been used since 2006 on Middle Island, off Warrnambool, in Victoria, Australia, to protect a small population of the Australian little penguin (Eudyptula novaehollandiae) against invasive foxes. In Patagonia they have been used to protect sheep from pumas.
