= Chinaman's Hat =

Chinaman's Hat may refer to:

- Conical Asian hat, a type of hat common in Asia
- Chinaman's Hat (Port Phillip), an octagonal structure in the South Channel of Port Phillip, Victoria, Australia
- Chinamans Hat Island, an islet in South Australia
- Mokoliʻi or Chinaman's Hat, a basalt island in Kāne'ohe Bay, Hawaii
- Chinaman's Hat, a rock formation on Mount Wilson, New South Wales
- Sombrero Chino (Chinaman's Hat), an islet offshore of Santiago Island in the Galápagos

== See also ==
- Chinese hat
