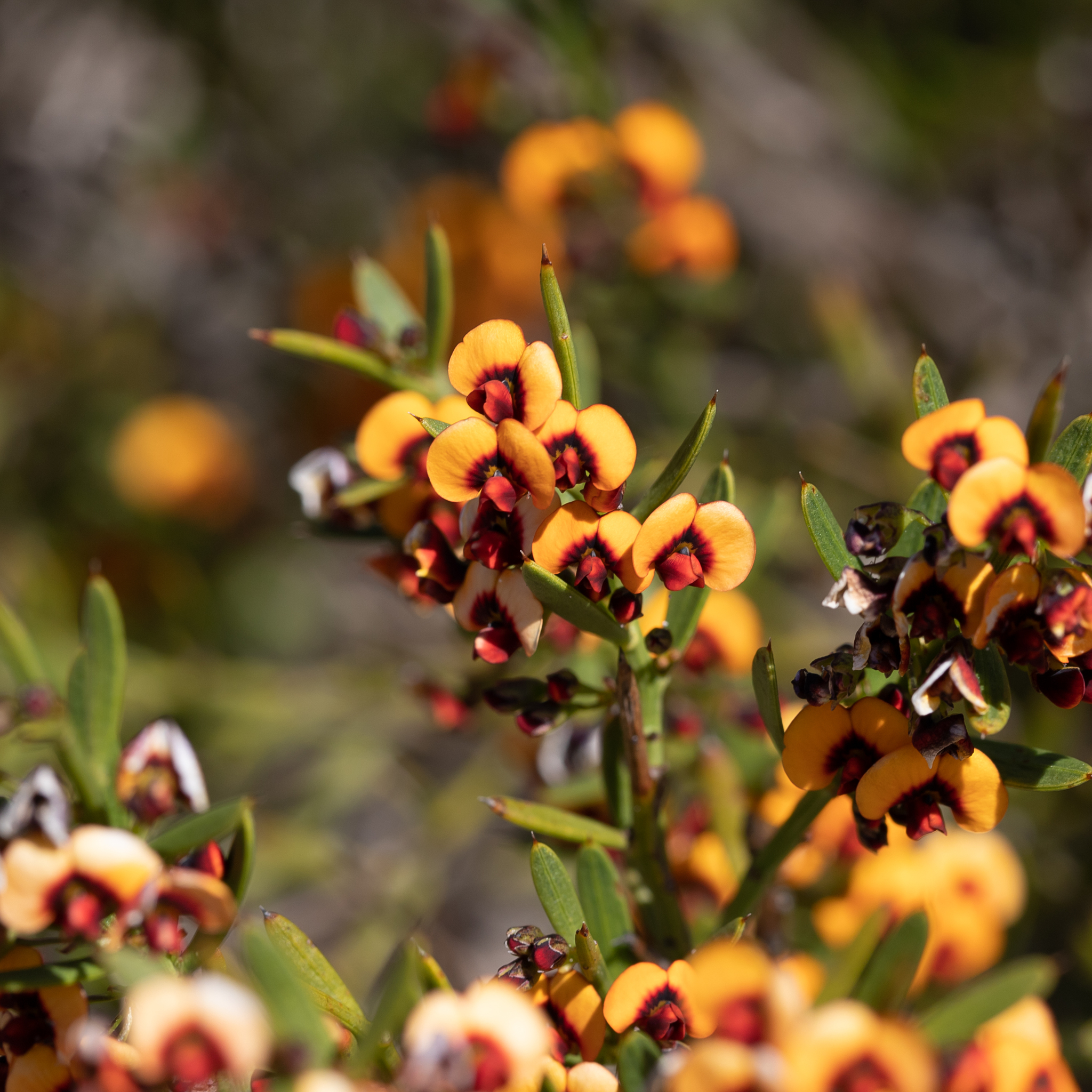
- In Dhilba Guuranda–Innes National Park

Scientific classification
- Kingdom: Plantae
- Clade: Tracheophytes
- Clade: Angiosperms
- Clade: Eudicots
- Clade: Rosids
- Order: Fabales
- Family: Fabaceae
- Subfamily: Faboideae
- Genus: Daviesia
- Species: D. sejugata

Binomial name
- Daviesia sejugata G.Chandler & Crisp

= Daviesia sejugata =

Species of flowering plant

Daviesia sejugata is a species of flowering plant in the family Fabaceae and is endemic to southern Australia. It is a straggling, mostly glabrous shrub with spiny, ridged branchlets, scattered, sharply-pointed, narrowly elliptic phyllodes, and yellow, maroon, orange and dark purple flowers.

== Description ==
Daviesia sejugata is a straggling, mostly glabrous shrub that typically grows to a height of up to 2 m (6 ft 7 in) and has spiny, ridged branchlets. Its phyllodes are scattered, narrowly elliptic to egg-shaped with the narrower end towards the base, mostly 15–33 mm (0.59–1.30 in) long, 2.5–5.5 mm (0.098–0.217 in) wide and sharply pointed. The flowers are arranged in leaf axils in one or two groups of two to five flowers, each group on a peduncle 1.0–1.5 mm (0.039–0.059 in) long, each flower on a pedicel 2–4.5 mm (0.079–0.177 in) long. The sepals are 3–4.5 mm (0.12–0.18 in) long and joined to form a bell-shaped base, the five lobes 0.7–1.5 mm (0.028–0.059 in) long. The standard petal is broadly egg-shaped with a notched centre, about 6–7 mm (0.24–0.28 in) long, 6.5–7.5 mm (0.26–0.30 in) wide and yellow with a maroon base and bright yellow centre. The wings are about 6.3 mm (0.25 in) long and red with orange tips, and the keel about 5 mm (0.20 in) long and dark purple. Flowering occurs in September and October and the fruit is a triangular pod 8–11 mm (0.31–0.43 in) long.

== Taxonomy and naming ==
Daviesia sejugata was first formally described in 1997 by Gregory T. Chandler and Michael Crisp in Australian Systematic Botany from specimens collected by David L. Jones near Cambridge, Tasmania in 1994. The specific epithet (sejugata) means "separated" or "disjunct".

== Distribution and habitat ==
This bitter-pea grows in mallee-heath on the southern Yorke Peninsula and on Kangaroo Island in South Australia. In northern and eastern Tasmania and on King Island it is found in heathy forest.
