= Cape Spencer Light =

Cape Spencer Light may refer to:

- Cape Spencer Light (Alaska) at the entrance to Cross Sound
- Cape Spencer Light (New Brunswick) on the Bay of Fundy
- Cape Spencer Lighthouse (South Australia) at the south west tip of Yorke Peninsula.

== See also ==
- Cape Spencer (disambiguation)
