= West Cape (disambiguation) =

West Cape is a headland in New Zealand.

West Cape may also refer to:

- West Cape, Prince Edward Island, a headland in Canada
- West Cape (South Australia), a headland

== See also ==
- Western Cape, a province of South Africa
