= Cape Spencer =

Cape Spencer can refer to

- Cape Spencer (Alaska)
- Cape Spencer (South Australia)
- Cape Spencer (Antarctica)

== See also ==
- Cape Spencer-Smith, cape in Antarctica
- Cape Spencer Light (disambiguation)
