= Dhilba Guuranda–Innes National Park =

Protected area in the Yorke Peninsula, South Australia

- IUCN category II (national park)
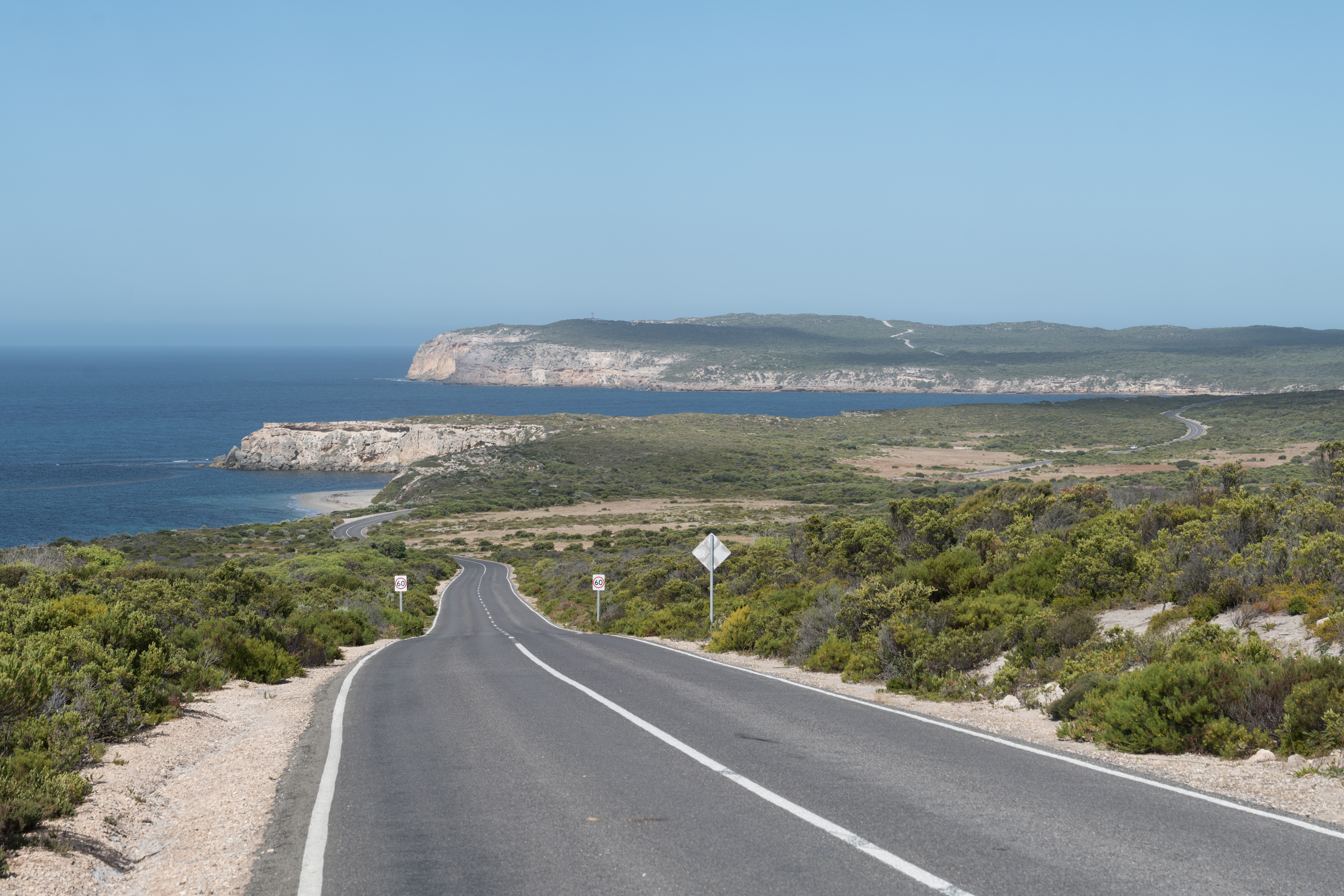
- Looking west towards Cape Spencer

- Location within South Australia
- Location: South Australia, Inneston
- Nearest city: Marion Bay
- Coordinates: 35°13′40″S 136°53′41″E
- Area: 94.15 km^{2} (36.35 sq mi)
- Established: 5 March 1970
- Visitors: 200,000 (in 2003)
- Governing body: Department of Environment and Water
- Website: Official website

Dhilba Guuranda–Innes National Park, formerly Innes National Park, is an IUCN-designated protected area in the Australian state of South Australia located on the southwest tip of Yorke Peninsula about 300 kilometres (190 mi) west of the state capital of Adelaide. It is a popular destination for camping, bushwalking, fishing, surfing and scuba diving.

== History ==
=== Prior use of the land ===
The Narungga people occupied the Yorke Peninsula for thousands of years. They consisted of four clans, the Kurnara of the north, the Windera of the east, the Wari of the west and the Dilpa of the south. They are the traditional owners of the land, and have strong cultural links to it, with some sites having particular spiritual significance.

European colonisation of the area began in 1846 with sheep grazing near Cape Spencer. Crops were grown on a small scale in the 19th and early 20th centuries. Innes National Park was named after William Innes, who discovered commercial quantities of gypsum in the early 1900s and founded the mining town of Inneston in 1913, which had a population of around 500 at its peak. Gypsum was mined until 1930 when the Great Depression made it uneconomical, and in 1970 the town and surrounding land was sold to the South Australian government, creating Innes National Park. Some gypsum mining still continues at nearby Marion Bay.

=== National park ===
The national park was declared on 5 March 1970 under the National Parks Act 1966 as the Innes National Park, to "conserve important habitat for the western whipbird, the mallee fowl and to protect a number of heritage buildings at Inneston". Land was added to the national park in 1977, 1984 and 1993 to deal with increased recreational use.

It was renamed as the Dhilba Guuranda–Innes National Park on 14 November 2020 in recognition of a co-management agreement signed by the Government of South Australia and the Narungga people.

Some of the buildings at Inneston have been restored and are available as basic hire accommodation.

== Description ==
=== Location ===
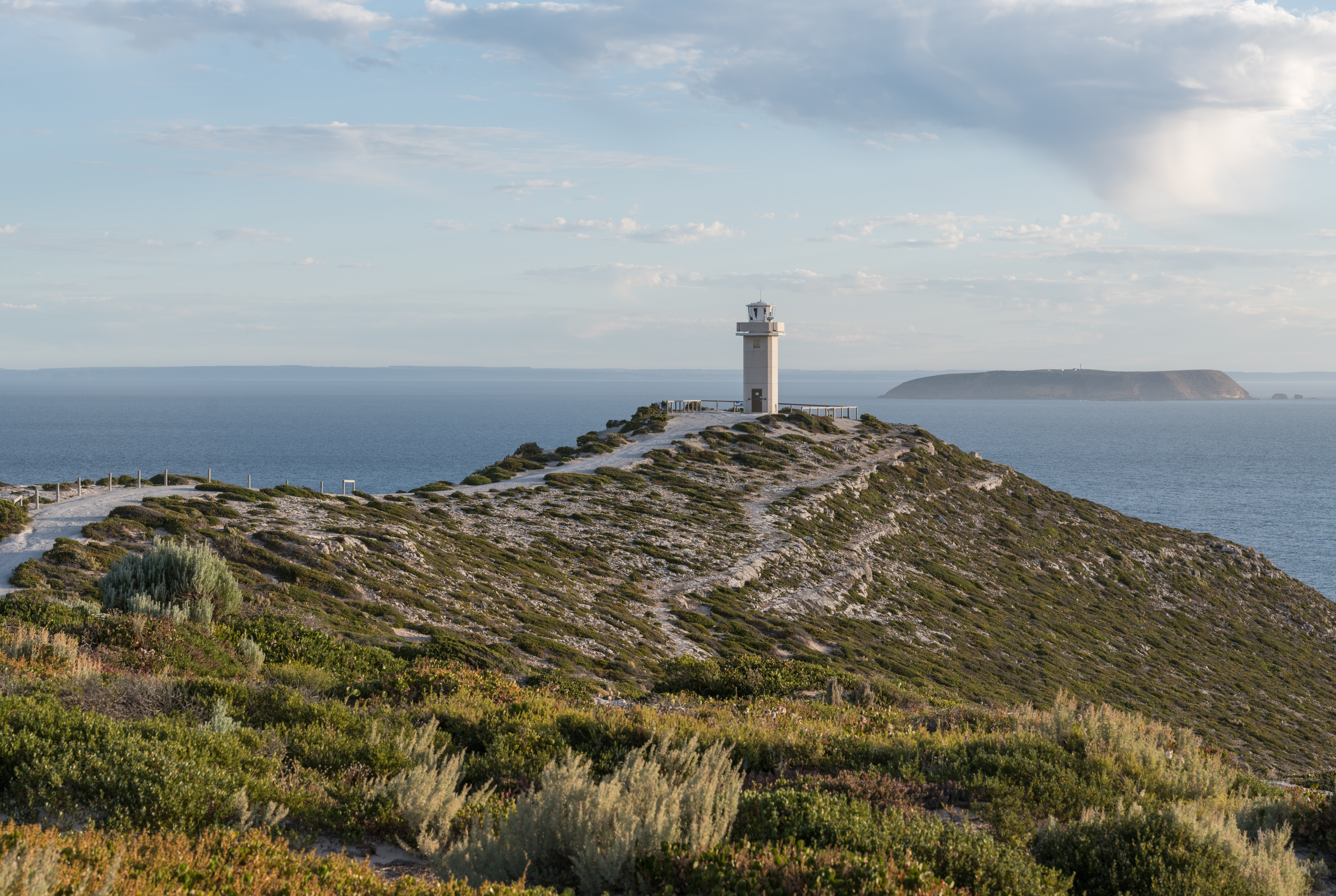
Cape Spencer lighthouse

Dhilba Guuranda–Innes National Park is located on the southern western extremity of Yorke Peninsula in South Australia about 300 kilometres (190 miles) by road from the Adelaide city centre. It is located within the locality officially known as Inneston.

=== Extent ===
The national park occupies most of the land on the south-western tip of Yorke Peninsula south-west of a line running from Willyama Bay on the south coast of the peninsula near Marion Bay to Gym Beach on the west coast of the peninsula and the following four islands immediately adjoining the coastline (from east to west): Chinamans Hat Island, Middle Island and South Island west of Pondalowie Bay, and Royston Island immediately west of Royston Head.

Within the above area, land excluded from the national park includes the following saline lakes which were associated with gypsum mining at the time of proclamation of the national park—Marion Lake, Snow Lake and Spider Lake.

As of 2014, the national park included the following "no access" areas (from east to west)—a section of coastline between Cape Spencer and Ethel Beach, South and Middle Islands at the entrance to Pondalowie Bay, Royston Island, the coastline between Royston Head and Dolphin Beach, and the coastline between Browns Beach and Gym Beach.

=== Physical landscape ===
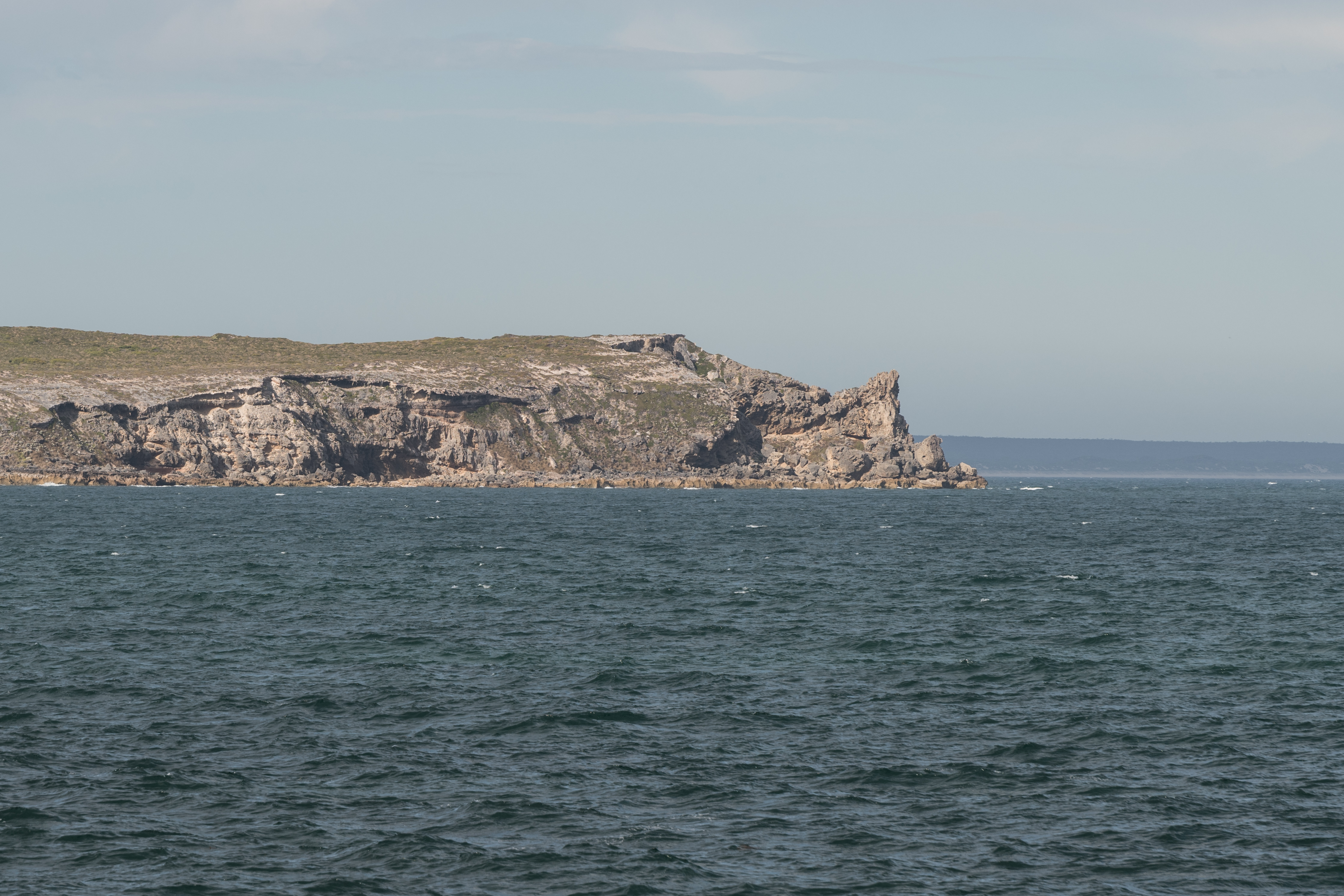
Rhino Head at the eastern end of Stenhouse Bay

The coastline extending from Willyama Bay to Cape Spencer consists of a number of bays such as Cable Bay and Stenhouse Bay with some prominent headlands such as Rhino Head and a line of cliffs between Cable Bay and Stenhouse Bay. From Cape Spencer to West Cape, an unbroken line of cliffs ranging in height between 37 metres (121 feet) and 79 metres (259 feet) with some sandy beaches at their feet make up the south-west coast of Yorke Peninsula. From West Cape to Pondalowie Bay, the cliff line is of a relatively lower height. From the south end of Pondalowie Bay to Gym Beach, areas of sand dunes dominate the shoreline and the land immediately adjoining it with the exception of Royston Head and the cliff line extending eastward to Dolphin Beach. The land between the national park's boundary and the road system is dominated in part by a network of saline lakes.

=== Road system ===
The national park is serviced by a road connected to the western end of the Yorke Highway which passes through Marion Bay. The road which starts at Stenhouse Bay follows the coastline as a sealed road passing Chinamans Hat Island, Cable Bay and the turn-offs to Cape Spencer, Ethel Beach, West Cape and two camping grounds at Pondalowie Bay. The road concludes as a sealed road at the turn-off to the Pondalowie Surf Break Carpark. It continues as an unsealed road, passing turn-offs to Dolphin Beach and Shell Beach, to terminate at Browns Beach in the north-west of the national park. Gym Beach in the extreme north-west, while being accessible via the national park's walking trail system can only reached via vehicle from the Marion Bay Road which is located to the east of the national park's boundary.

== Protected areas ==
The national park is classified as an International Union for Conservation of Nature (IUCN) category II protected area.

The waters adjoining the coastline of the national park including the four islands are within a habitat protection zone in the Southern Spencer Gulf Marine Park, a statutory designation.

The national park is within the extent of an Important Bird Area known as the Southern Yorke Peninsula Important Bird Area, identified as such by BirdLife International because it supports populations of mallee fowl as well as of other threatened bird species such as the western whipbird.

== Flora and fauna ==
=== Flora ===
As of 2003, 333 species of native plants had been recorded in Dhilba Guuranda–Innes National Park of which 115 species were of conservation significance including 24 scheduled in the South Australian National Parks and Wildlife Act 1972 and the following four species listed in the Australian Environment Protection and Biodiversity Conservation Act 1999: annual candles, winter spider-orchid, bead samphire and splendid bush-pea.

=== Fauna ===
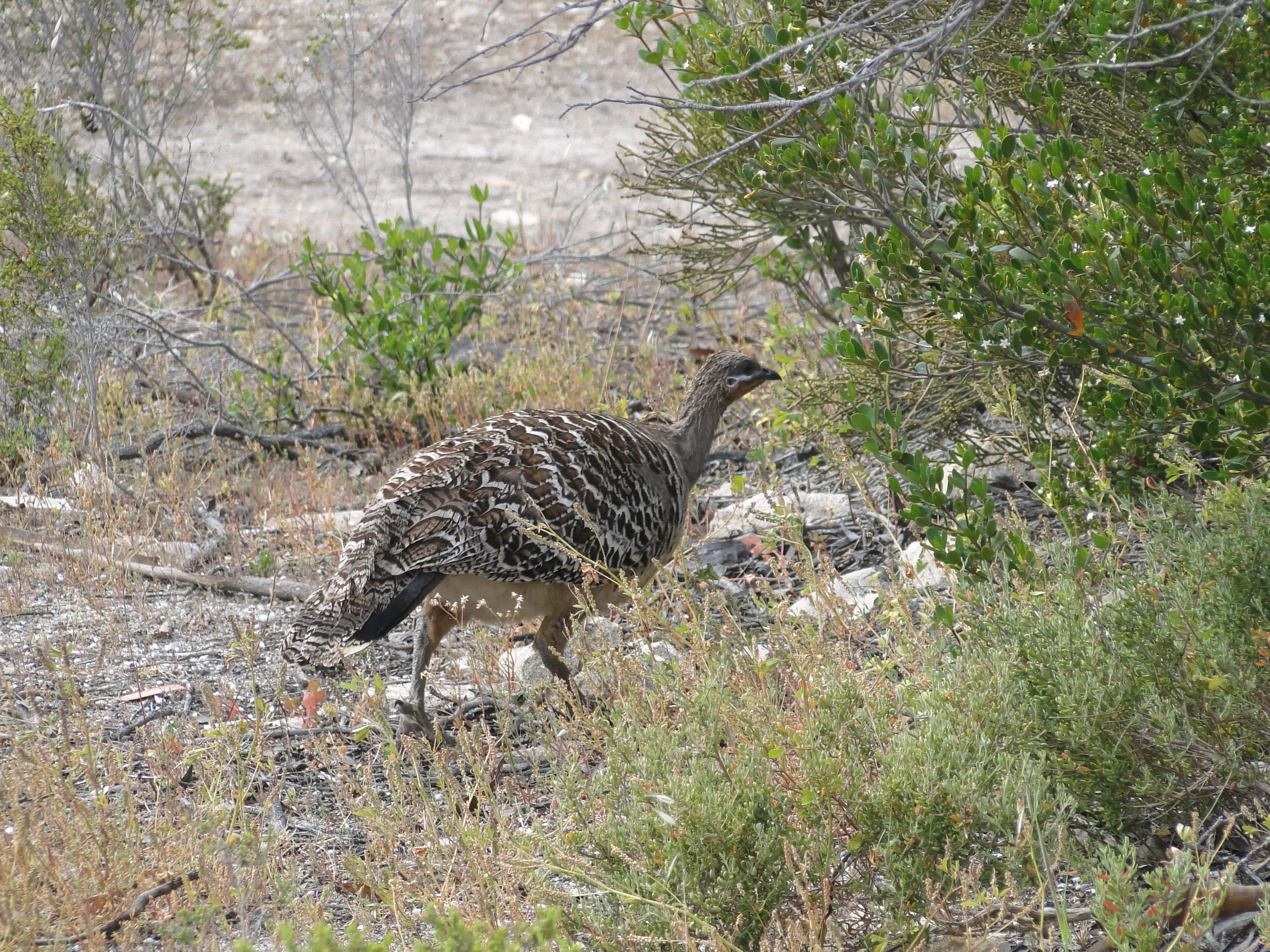
Malleefowl in the Dhilba Guuranda–Innes National Park

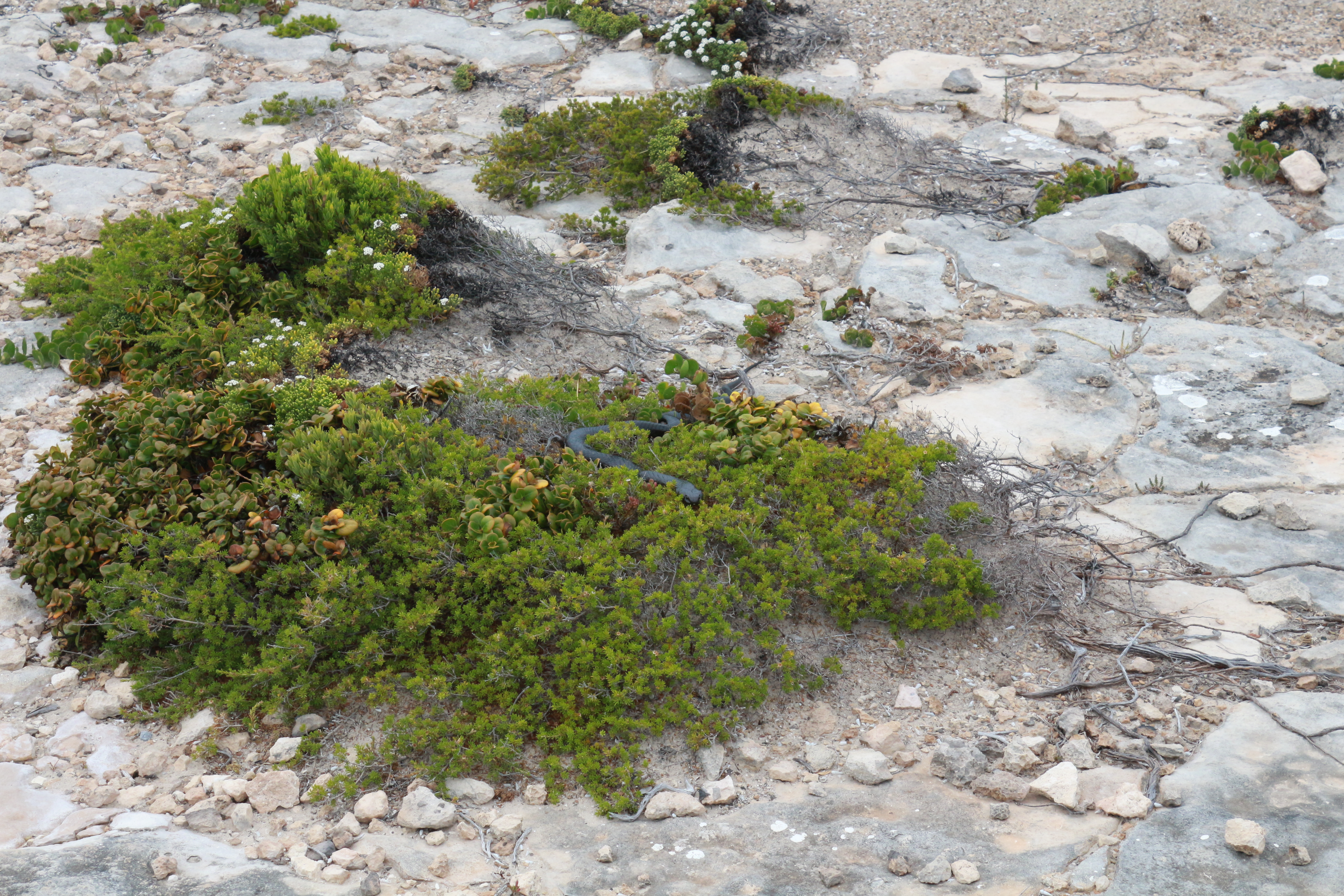
Black snake in Dhilba Guuranda–Innes National Park

As of 2003, the following animals were recorded within the park:

- Native mammals included New Zealand fur seal, western pygmy possum, Gould's wattle bat, chocolate wattled bat, common dolphin, southern right whale, western grey kangaroo, Australian sea lion, short-beaked echidna and bottlenose dolphin.
- Birds included 111 species of native bird, of which 13 species were scheduled in Australian and state legislation. The following 13 species were listed in the National Parks and Wildlife Act 1972 either as being vulnerable or rare species—chestnut quail-thrush, eastern reef egret, fairy tern, hooded plover, little tern, malleefowl, osprey, painted button-quail, peregrine falcon, rock parrot, shy heathwren, western whipbird and white-bellied sea-eagle while the malleefowl was also recognised nationally as a vulnerable species under the Environment Protection and Biodiversity Conservation Act 1999.
- Reptiles included marbled gecko, mallee snake-eye, painted dragon, barking gecko, yellow-faced whipsnake, black tiger snake, eastern stone gecko, eastern bearded dragon, bull skink, eastern brown snake, four-toed earless skink, peninsula brown snake, southern four-toed slider, common scaly-foot, common dwarf skink, western bluetongue, Adelaide snake-eye, sleepy lizard and prickly dragon.
- Introduced animals included rock dove, cat, rabbit, house mouse, house sparrow, black rat, common starling and fox.

After steps were taken to eradicate pests and fence off the tip of the Yorke Peninsula in a project initially (2019) called the Great Southern Ark and later Marna Banggara, species reintroduction has begun. Brush-tailed bettongs, or woylies, were the first species reintroduced in the area, with the first 40 individuals translocated from Wedge Island, in June 2021. The woylies were the first of about 20 locally extinct species which are to be moved there by around 2040. In July 2022, another 36 woylies were translocated, this time from Western Australia, with the permission of the Noongar traditional custodians, in a move that will boost genetic diversity.

== Natural and cultural heritage ==
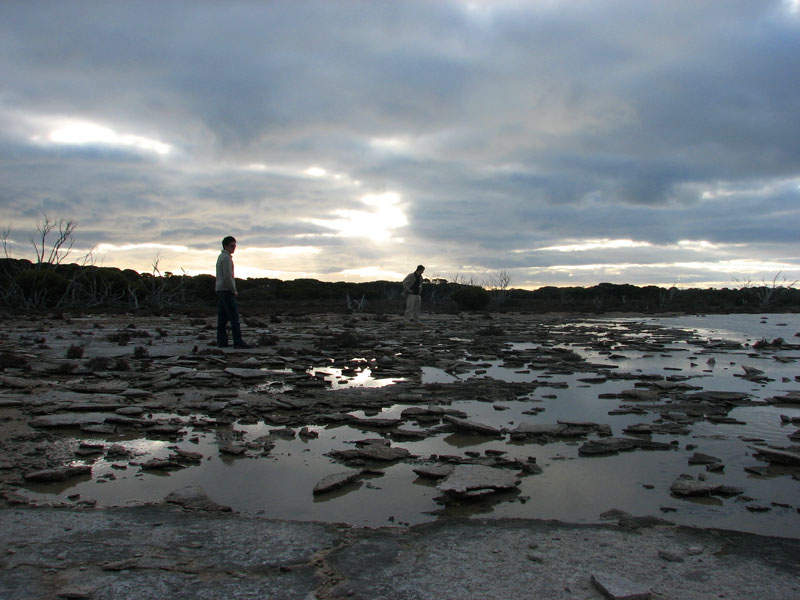
Salt lakes in Dhilba Guuranda–Innes National Park

The national park was listed on the former Register of the National Estate because of its natural and European heritage.

=== Natural heritage ===
The following three lakes which support a population of stromatolites are listed on the South Australian Heritage Register maintained by the South Australian Government: Deep Lake, Inneston Lake and Marion Lake.

=== Aboriginal heritage ===
As of 2003, 21 sites of significance to the Narungga people had been identified. These consisted of "burial sites" and a broad classification known as "archaeological sites".

=== European heritage ===
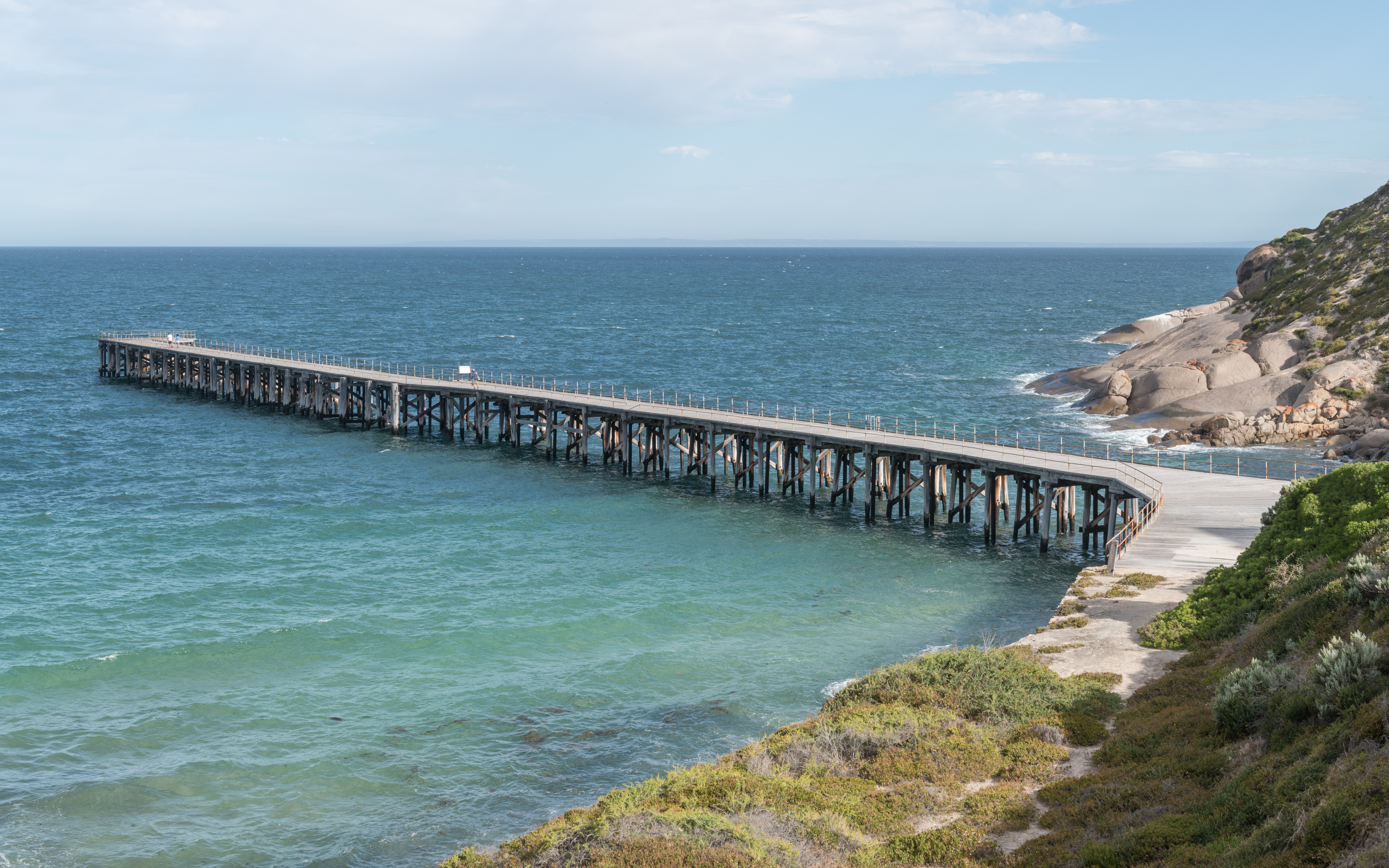
Stenhouse Bay Jetty

==== Mining ====
The following two sites at Inneston and Stenhouse Bay associated with the mining of gypsum are listed on the South Australian Heritage Register—the "Inneston Gypsum Complex" and the Stenhouse Bay Jetty.

==== Shipwrecks ====
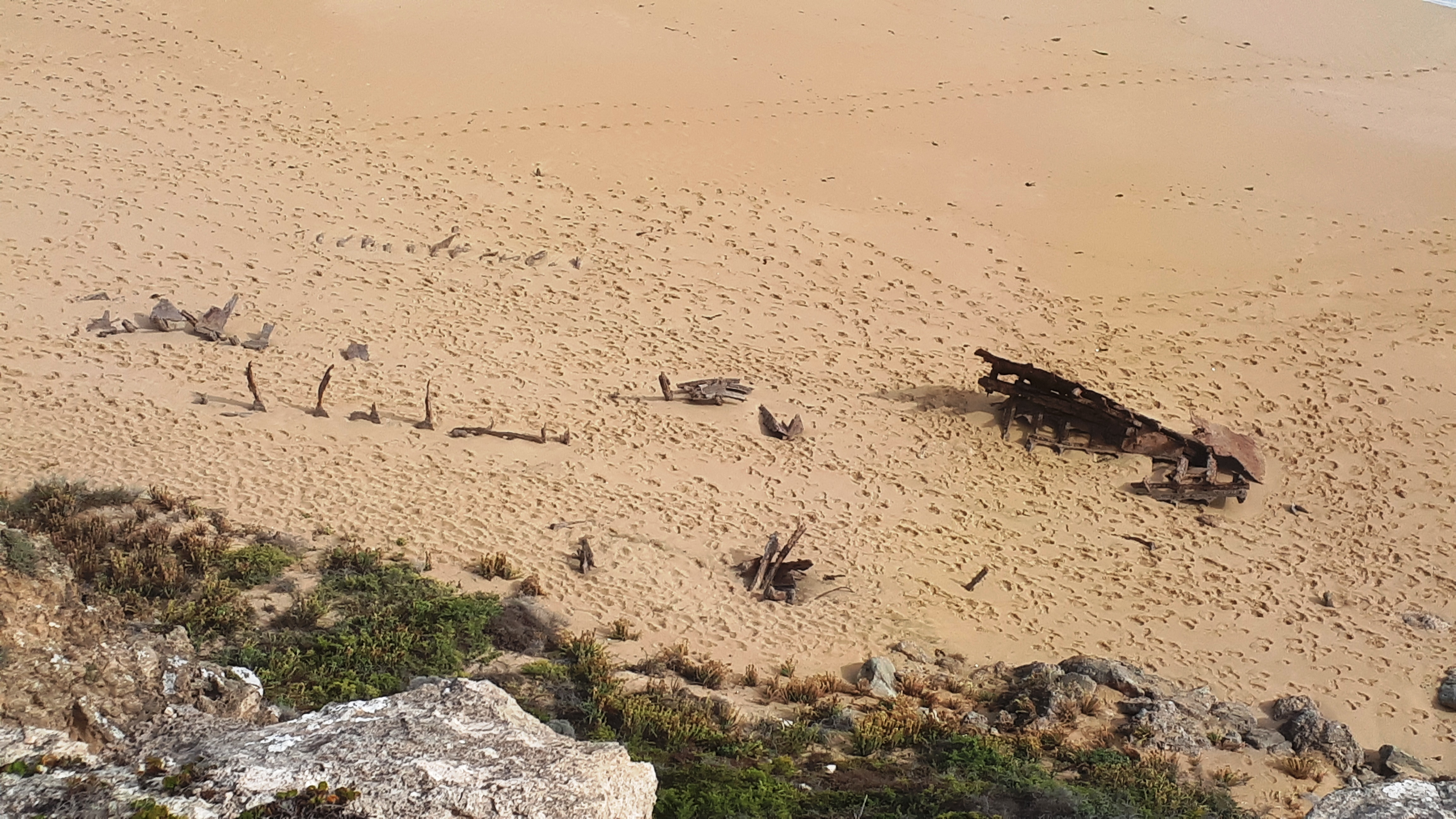
What is left of the Ethel in 2021, Ethel Beach, Dhilba Guuranda–Innes National Park

At least four shipwrecks which are located within the national park or immediately adjoining its coastal boundary are protected under Australian and state historic shipwrecks legislation, that is the Underwater Cultural Heritage Act 2018 (Cwth) and the Historic Shipwrecks Act 1981 (SA).

- SS Marion, which run aground to the immediate east of Chinamans Hat Island during 1862.
- The barque Ethel, which run aground on the coastline between West Cape and Cape Spencer on a beach now known as Ethel Beach during 1904. The remains of the Ethel lie parallel to the shore below the cliff at Ethel Beach. For many years the hull was largely intact, deteriorating gradually with every storm. A severe gale in 1988 caused the hull to completely collapse, leaving the iron frame as the most identifiable feature of the site. The wreck is mostly covered by sand, sometimes revealed more during storms.
- SS Ferret, which run aground in 1920 on what is now Ethel Beach.
- Hougomont, which was scuttled in 1932 to form a breakwater, lies close to the coastline near Stenhouse Bay.

== Services and attractions ==
=== Camping ===
Camping grounds are available at the following locations (from east to west)—Stenhouse Bay, Cable Bay, Pondalowie Bay (nine sites for caravans large vehicles, seventeen sites for Camper Trailers), Casuarina, Shell Beach and Gym Beach.

=== Indoor accommodation ===
Indoor accommodation is available at three locations—a number of restored buildings at Inneston, the Stenhouse Bay hall and a cottage at Shell Beach.

=== Walking ===
A system of trails allows visitors to the national park to enjoy views of the coastline and adjoining waters and to observe flora and fauna including species such as southern right whales and dolphins and features such as lighthouses and heritage sites. As of 2014, there are three major walking trails—the Thomson Pfitzner Plaster Trail Hike that connects Stenhouse Bay and Inneston, the Royston Head Hike from Dolphin Beach to Royston Head and the Gym Beach Hike which connects Browns Beach and Gym Beach. A number of minor trails connect the road system to locations such as Cape Spencer, Ethel Beach, West Cape and Pondalowie Bay.

=== Surfing ===
The main surf break at Pondalowie is a popular quality wave. It consists of a combination left and right peak that breaks over a reef and sand bottom. The left is good up to about 4 feet (1.2 m). The right starts to become good from between 3 feet (0.9 m) and 8 feet (2.4 m) plus. A second smaller right-hand reef break known as "Richard's Reef" is located 250 metres (820 ft) further north along the beach. It was named in honour of Richard Thomas, a long-time local surfer and resident of the area. Not far from Stenhouse Bay is a break known as "Chinaman's". This is a powerful and hollow left-hand reef break which breaks in shallow water and washes over a rock shelf. It is a high-quality wave that is suitable only for skilled surfers, and caution should be used when surfing here.

== Gallery ==
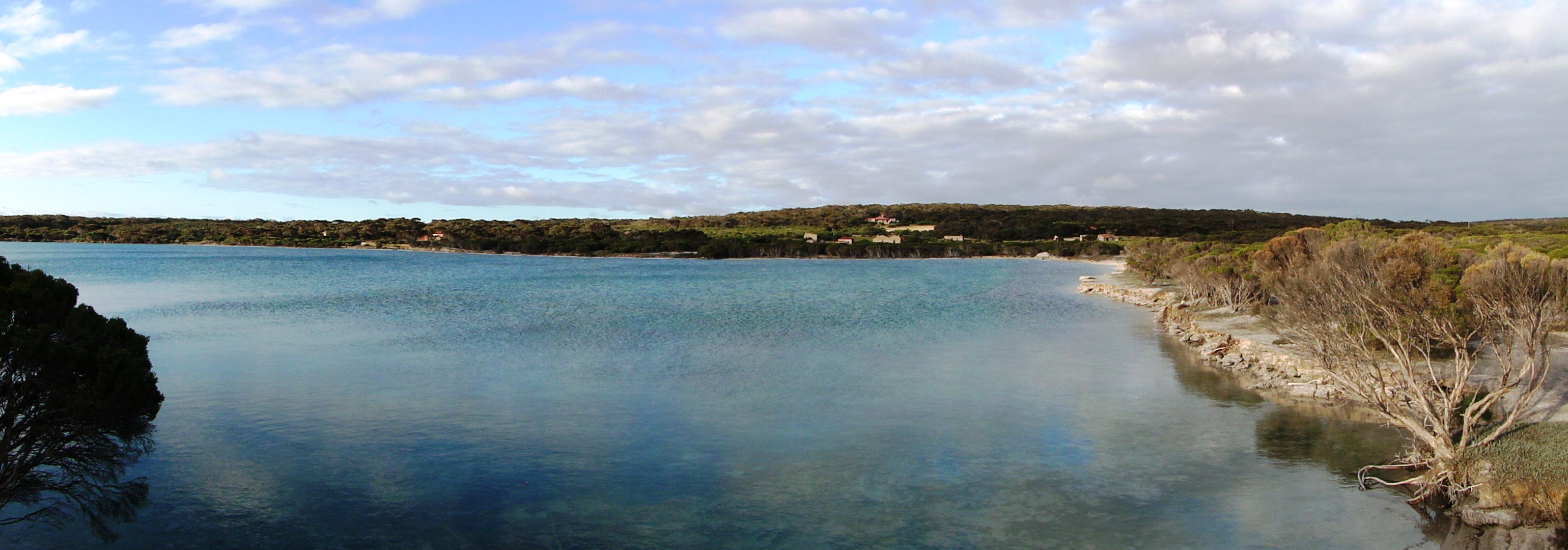
Inneston Lake

== See also ==
- Protected areas of South Australia
- Cape Spencer Lighthouse (South Australia)

== Citations and references ==
=== References ===
- Arnott, Terry (1996), Investigator Strait Maritime Heritage Trail, State Heritage Branch, Department of Environment and Natural Resources, ISBN 978-0-7308-4720-5
- "Australian National Shipwreck Database (ANSD) - Hougomont". Commonwealth of Australia, Department of Environment.
- "Australian National Shipwreck Database (ANSD) - Ethel". Commonwealth of Australia, Department of Environment.
- Baker, J.L (2004). Towards a System of Ecologically Representative Marine Protected Areas in South Australian Marine Bioregions - Technical Report. Part 3 (PDF). Department for Environment and Heritage, South Australia.
- "Important Bird Areas factsheet: Southern Yorke Peninsula". BirdLife International. 2015.
- "Terrestrial Protected Areas of South Australia (see 'DETAIL' tab)". CAPAD 2012. Australian Government - Department of the Environment. 6 February 2014.
- "Innes National Park Management Plan" (PDF). Department for Environment and Heritage (DEH). June 2003.
- "Marine Park 12, Southern Spencer Gulf" (PDF). Department of Environment, Water and Natural Resources (DEWNR). 2012. Archived (PDF) from the original on 24 September 2015.
- "Innes National Park Map" (PDF). Department of Environment, Water and Natural Resources (DEWNR). 2014.
- The Waters of South Australia a series of charts, sailing notes and coastal photographs, Dept. of Marine and Harbors, South Australia, 1985, ISBN 978-0-7243-7603-2
- "South Australian Heritage Register (SAHR): Inneston Gypsum Mining Precinct". Department of Environment, Water and Natural Resources. Archived from the original on 4 March 2016.
- "South Australian Heritage Register (SAHR): Stenhouse Bay Jetty and Loading Plant". Department of Environment, Water and Natural Resources. Archived from the original on 4 March 2016.
- "South Australian Heritage Register (SAHR): Inneston Lake and Deep Lake Geological Sites". Department of Environment, Water and Natural Resources. Archived from the original on 4 March 2016.
- "South Australian Heritage Register (SAHR): Marion Lake Geological Site". Department of Environment, Water and Natural Resources. Archived from the original on 4 March 2016.
