= SS Ferret =

Early 20th century Scottish steamship

Coordinates: 35.269121°S 136.845835°E

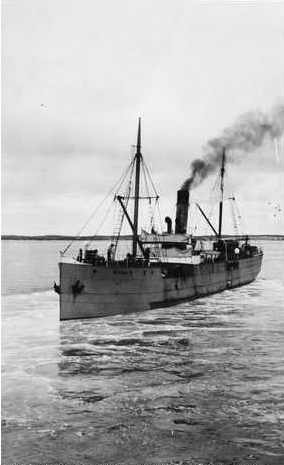
- SS Ferret in 1910

History
- Name: SS Ferret
- Owner: G & J Burns, Glasgow
- Builder: J & G Thomson, Glasgow
- Laid down: 1871
- Fate: Wrecked near Reef Head, South Australia, 1920

General characteristics
- Type: Cargo steamship
- Tonnage: 460
- Length: 170.9 ft (52.1 m)
- Beam: 23.2 ft (7.1 m)
- Draught: 12.7 ft (3.9 m)
- Propulsion: Compound inverted steam engines of 90 h.p., having two cylinders of 23 inches and 40 inches diameter
- Capacity: 90hp

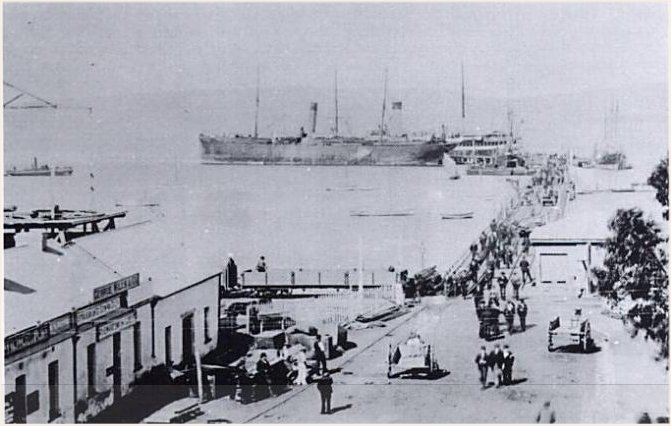
SS Ferret moored at Albany Town Jetty (date unknown)

SS Ferret was an iron screw steamship of 460 tons built in Glasgow (Scotland) in 1871 by J & G Thomson, Glasgow.

The ship was built for G & J Burns of Glasgow for use in the River Clyde ferry service. In 1873, Dingwall & Skye Railway Co Ltd bought it for use on their Strome to Skye ferry service. Later, as part of a merger, it was acquired by Highland Railway Co. of Inverness.

In 1880 the ship was stolen as part of a conspiracy in which it disappeared from its home in Scotland and mysteriously reappeared several months later in Australia under a new name. It remained in Australia for the remainder of its working life.

== Theft ==
While the ship was laid up in Greenock in October 1880, several men approached the owners seeking to charter the ship for a Mediterranean pleasure cruise. The men were James Stewart Henderson, alias Smith, alias Bernard; Edward Rashleigh Carlyon, alias Wright, alias Leigh; and Joseph Walker, alias Wallace. Henderson presented himself as the leader and managed to convince the owners that he had substantial financial credentials, and that the cruise was for his wife who was unwell. He claimed to be a relative of W.H. Smith, First Lord of the Admiralty. A six-month lease was agreed, and bills for the first month's charter paid, later to be found worthless. Henderson operated a fraudulent London shipbroking office named Henderson & Co. to support the scam.

Provisioning for the voyage began immediately, and crew and officers were hurriedly recruited. Walker and Carlyon were appointed Purser and Chief officer respectively. A man named Watkins was recruited as Sailing master and another man, Griffin, as Chief engineer.

The conspirators bought and loaded provisions and premium wine worth £500, and £1,400 worth of "stores, plate and coal", again all paid for with bills later found to be worthless. The ship sailed from Glasgow to Cardiff, and another Welsh port where they bunkered 260 tons of coal. Henderson's wife came aboard at Cardiff. Ferret then sailed through the Straits of Gibraltar, ostensibly for the "Mediterranean cruise", ensuring that shore-stations clearly saw the "All Well" signal. However, during the night with lights out, it passed back through the Straits, apparently unobserved—the ruse being that people would assume its disappearance meant the ship had been lost with all hands somewhere within the Mediterranean Sea.

While at sea in the Atlantic, Henderson told the crew and officers he was on a secret mission, that he was a colonel in the United States Cavalry, and that he needed to destroy all traces of his identity. He also told them he owned the ship and was entitled to do with it as he pleased, that he was immensely wealthy, and that anyone who did not cooperate with the scheme would be shot. Under his instructions, the ship was radically changed in appearance: the yellow funnel was painted black, previously blue lifeboats were painted white, and various items identifying the ship were tossed overboard. The wheelhouse and chartroom were dismantled and rebuilt on the aft-deck, further disguising the ship's profile. The ship was renamed Bantam, taking the name of another ship of similar tonnage on the Lloyd's Register, and forged shipping documentation was created to support the false name. The crew were instructed to say the ship had sailed from Singapore if questioned. The ship next sailed to the Cape Verde Islands and then to Santos, Brazil, where it arrived on Boxing Day 1880. The crew took on a consignment cargo of coffee for Marseille. Henderson then sailed for Cape Town, changing the ship's name en route, for the second time, to India. On arrival, he sold the coffee for £13,000. He then sailed for Port Phillip in Victoria, Australia via Mauritius and Albany, Western Australia arriving at Victoria in April 1881. Henderson told Australian port authorities that he had come from Bermuda.

Meanwhile, the owners, Highland Railway Co., had heard nothing of the ship and had advertised its disappearance widely. An observant wharf policeman on duty at Queenscliff, Constable James Davidson, who had recently arrived from Scotland, was at his post as the India steamed past. At the time, he happened to be reading a copy of The Scotsman newspaper which included an article taken from the Glasgow Evening Citizen and which described the mysterious disappearance of the Ferret from the Clyde. The article read in part:

Vessel Lost, Stolen, or Strayed from the Clyde. Under this singular heading the Glasgow Evening Citizen of Saturday prints a curious narrative, of which the following is a summary of the principal statements:
"About the middle of October last a gentleman giving the name of Walker called on a leading firm of ship store merchants in Glasgow, represented that he was acting as broker for a gentleman of means who was going on a long yachting cruise, and desired to favour the firm with the contract for the provisioning of the vessel. References were asked, and found to be satisfactory. It was stated that the vessel had been chartered from the Highland Railway Company. It was also given out, more by ambiguous allusion than by direct assertion, that the person for whom Mr. Walker appeared was named Smith, and a relative of the late First Lord of the Admiralty. The goods were therefore supplied, including it is rumoured, a large stock of the highest class wines from London. The vessel was then lying at Greenock undergoing an overhaul at the hands of Messrs. Steel and Co., to make her more suitable for the new work and waters in which she was to be engaged for the next six months. The name of the vessel is (or was) the Ferret; and, to give an idea of her appearance, it may be mentioned that she is a screw steamer, 170 feet long, 23 feet broad, and 12 feet deep, having a gross measurement of 347 tons. She is fitted with compound inverted engines of 90 h.p., having two cylinders of 23 inches and 40 inches diameter. Both vessel and engines were constructed by Messrs. J. and G. Thomson, of Glasgow, in 1871..."

Seeing that the India fit the description well, Davidson noticed certain unusual behaviours coming from the ship, and noted that it had broken a number of port regulations. His suspicions raised, he kept it under observation and alerted his superiors. Customs officials seized the ship, and the faint appearance of another vessel's name under the lettering "India" soon confirmed the hoax.

Henderson and his accomplices tried to escape but were soon apprehended, charged, and brought to trial by jury in Melbourne before Justice Williams. Henderson, Carlyon, and Walker were each charged with conspiracy on the high seas, attempt to defraud the ship's owners, and customs and other maritime offenses, including changing the name and official number of a ship. Chief Engineer Griffin, who had been recruited in Glasgow, provided much of the evidence that convicted the three.

Watkins, the sailing master, had left the ship in Cape Town after which Wright had taken over the sailing duties. The three defendants fabricated a story that Watkins had led Peruvian arms smuggling racket, and that he told them to attempt to sell the ship. The court rejected the story and found the three men guilty.

Henderson and Walker each received seven years and Carlyon received three and a half years in gaol. Police investigations later found that Henderson had been offered £8500 for the ship through Melbourne shipbrokers Duthie & Co. but had declined and asked for £10,000. His intention had been to sail it to Sydney to sell.

The Melbourne press reported extensively on the details of the trial. The Age and The Argus both provided daily accounts of the proceedings, and The Argus published depositions from key witnesses.

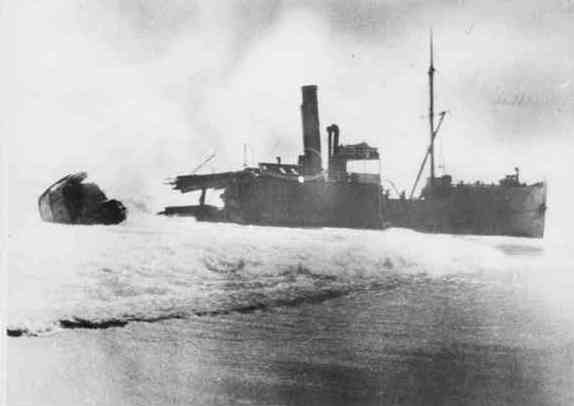
The Ferret breaking up on the beach at Cape Spencer in 1920

== Later years ==
On instructions from the Highland Railway Co. the ship was sold to William Whinham, of Adelaide in 1881. It was registered as the Ferret in Port Adelaide in November 1883 and taken over by Adelaide Steamship Company the same year. SS Ferret was employed for general cargo work in the Port Adelaide-Spencer Gulf trade and on the southern Australian coast for many years. It made weekly round trips from Port Adelaide to Port Lincoln, Moonta, Wallaroo and Cowell, carrying passengers and cargo.

In November 1903 it was involved in an incident in which it ran aground on Walrus Rock near Long Point, Spencer Gulf. About eight hours later, after sixty tons of cargo had been unloaded, it was successfully refloated. A Marine Board enquiry was held, receiving evidence from the master, Captain G.T. Joss who was cautioned.

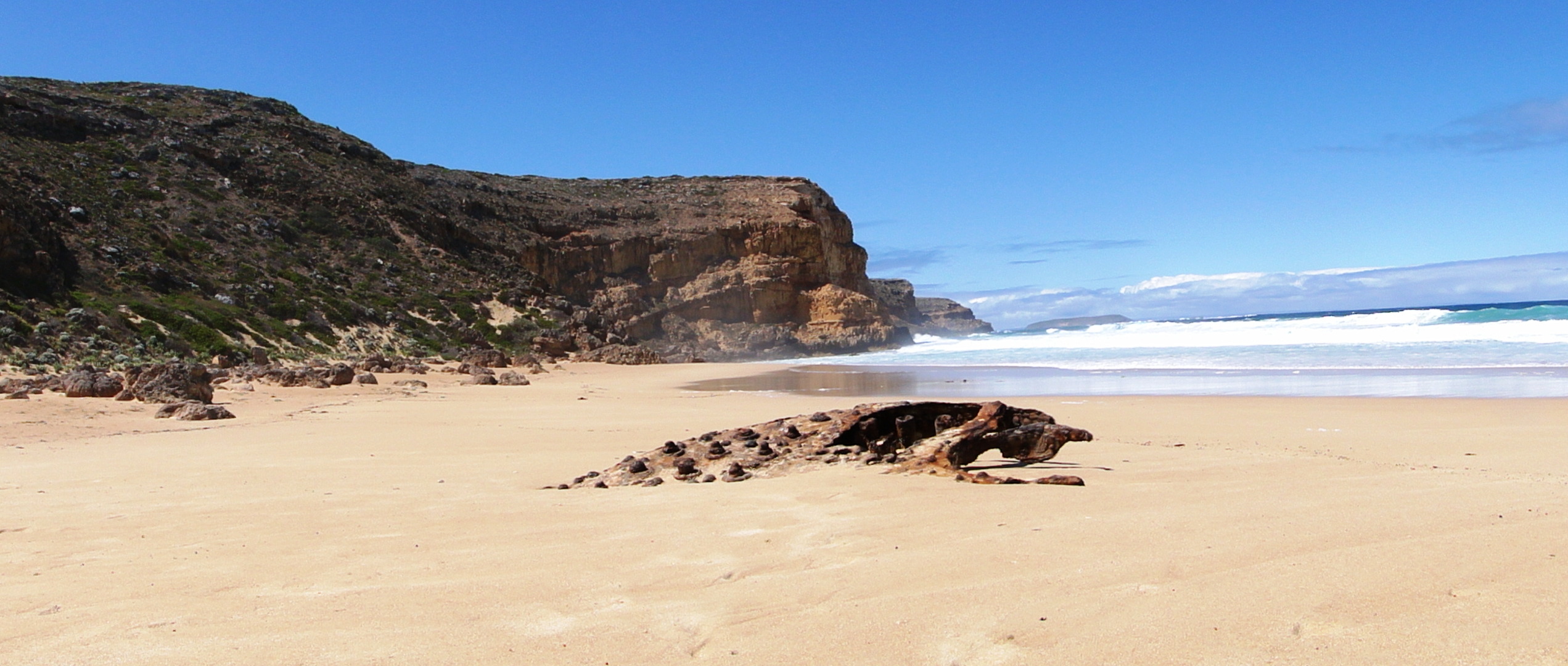
The boiler from the ship Ferret, wrecked in Ethel Bay, Innes National Park, South Australia.

It was wrecked on 14 November 1920 after running onto a beach during a storm at Reef Head near Cape Spencer on the south coast of Yorke Peninsula. All 21 crew were rescued after walking 5 kilometres (3.1 mi) overland to Stenhouse Bay. The ship was under the command of a Captain Blair.

Coincidentally, the same beach had been the site of a wreck in January 1904, 17 years previous. A stricken Norwegian barque, Ethel, had run onto the beach and the SS Ferret had been the first vessel to arrive to report and assist with the rescue of its crew and passengers.

== See also ==
- List of shipwrecks of Australia
