= Southern Yorke Peninsula Important Bird Area =

Important Bird Area in South Australia

Coordinates: 35°11′05″S 137°00′46″E

Location of the Southern Yorke Peninsula Important Bird Area in South Australia

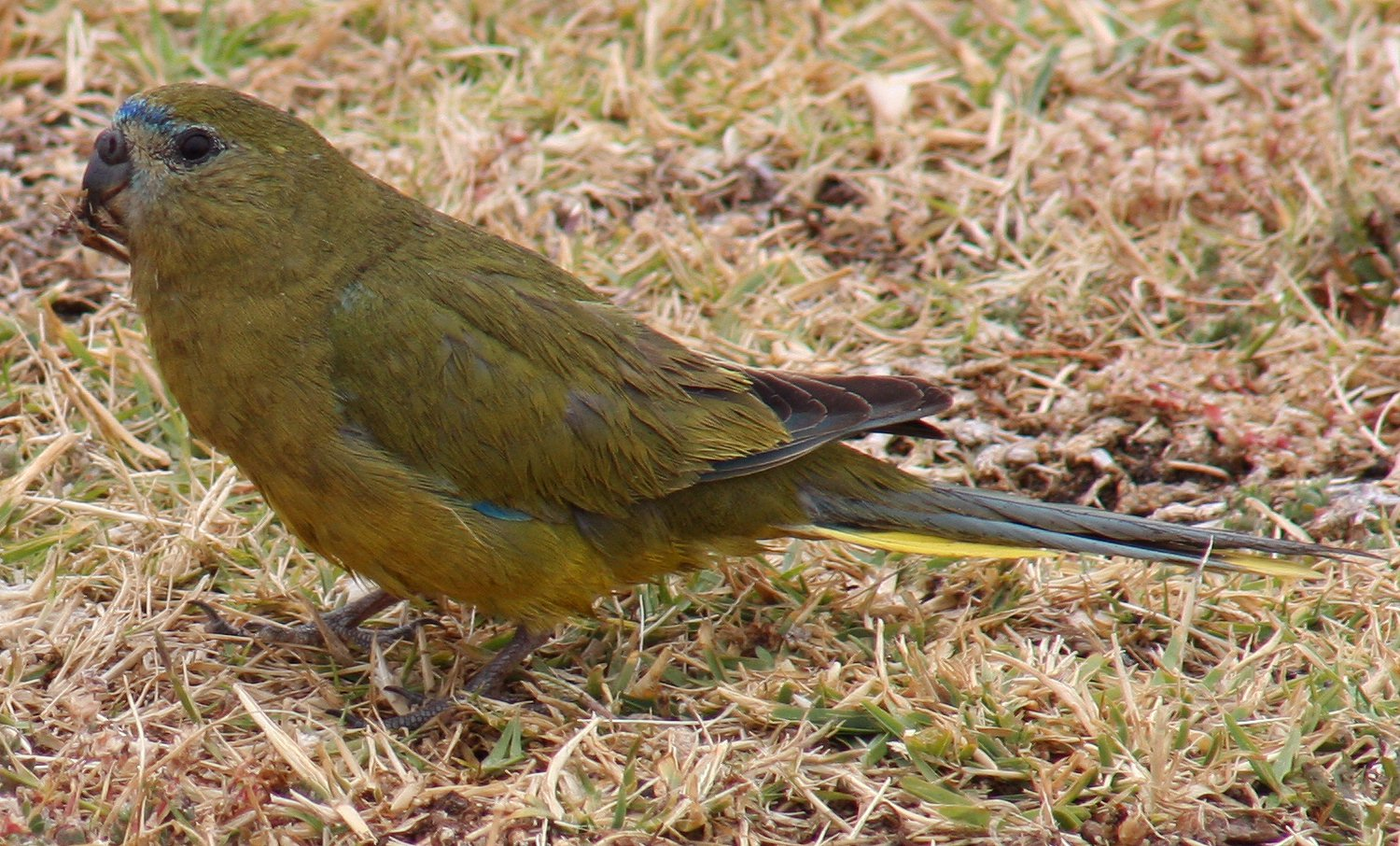
The IBA is an important area for rock parrots

The Southern Yorke Peninsula Important Bird Area is a 348 square kilometres (134 square miles) tract of land consisting of most of the south-western tip of the Yorke Peninsula in South Australia about 300 kilometres (190 miles) west of Adelaide.

== Description ==
The Important Bird Area (IBA) includes most of the south-western tip of Yorke Peninsula including land protected by statute, privately owned or declared as crown land and which usually has natural habitat. Outside this area, most of the Yorke Peninsula's native vegetation has been cleared for grazing and cropping. The land in the IBA is an undulating plain, bordered by coastal cliffs, with calcareous sands and loams forming dunes over limestone bedrock. Habitats include intertidal ecosystems, beaches, heathlands, mallee woodlands and salt lakes. Temperatures average 13 degrees Celsius (55 degrees Fahrenheit) in winter and 28 degrees Celsius (82 degrees Fahrenheit) in summer with an average annual rainfall of 500 millimetres (20 inches).

== Criteria for nomination as an IBA ==
The site has been identified by BirdLife International as an IBA because it supports populations of malleefowl, fairy terns, western whipbirds, rock parrots and purple-gaped honeyeaters.

== Associated protected areas ==
While the IBA has no statutory status, it does overlap the following protected areas declared by the South Australian government: Innes National Park and Warrenben Conservation Park.

== See also ==
- List of birds of South Australia
