= Chinese hat =

Chinese hat may refer to:

- Asian conical hat
- Any hat worn as part of Chinese clothing
- Headwear worn throughout Imperial Chinese history
- Calyptraea chinensis, also known as the Chinese hat snail
- Holmskioldia sanguinea, also known as the Chinese hat plant

== See also ==
- Chinaman's Hat
