= Cape Spencer Lighthouse (South Australia) =

Lighthouse in South Australia

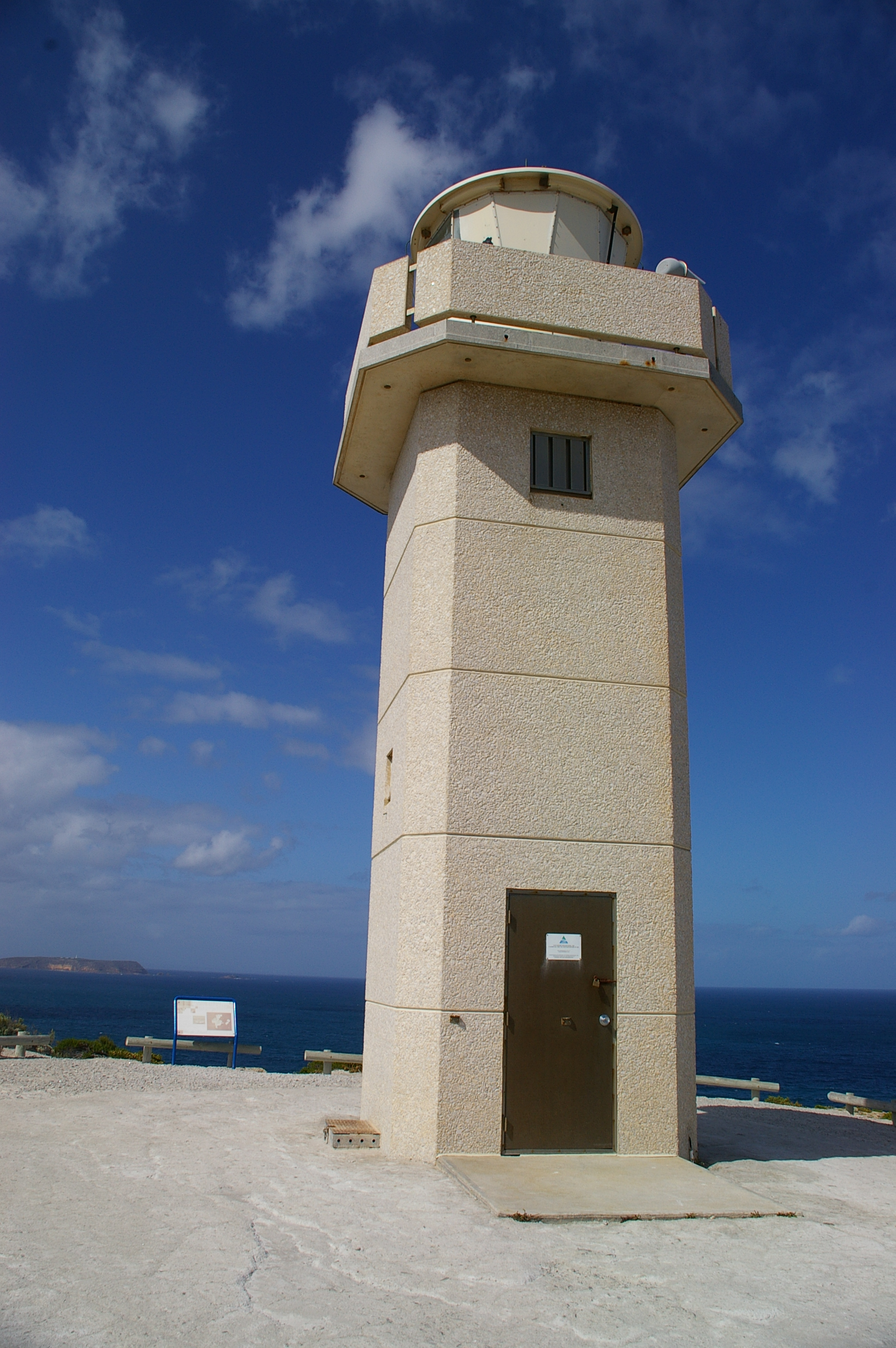
- Lighthouse at Cape Spencer
- Location: Cape Spencer; Inneston; South Australia; Australia
- Coordinates: 35°17′56.2″S 136°52′57.1″E

Tower
- Constructed: 1950 (first)
- Construction: concrete tower
- Height: 9 metres (30 ft)
- Shape: square tower with octagonal balcony and lantern
- Markings: unpainted tower and white lantern
- Power source: mains electricity
- Operator: Australian Maritime Safety Authority

Light
- First lit: 1975 (current)
- Focal height: 78 metres (256 ft)
- Intensity: 25,000 cd
- Range: 23 nautical miles (43 km; 26 mi)
- Characteristic: FI (3) W 15s. continuous red light is shown over nearby reefs

Cape Spencer Lighthouse is a lighthouse in the Australian state of South Australia located on Cape Spencer on the Yorke Peninsula in gazetted locality of Inneston. The navigation aid was originally established as an automatic beacon which was first lit in late 1950, was established after a lengthy period of lobbying of the Australian government. The automatic beacon was replaced in 1975 by an automatic lighthouse facility.

== See also ==
- List of lighthouses in Australia
