= Inneston, South Australia =

Inneston South Australia
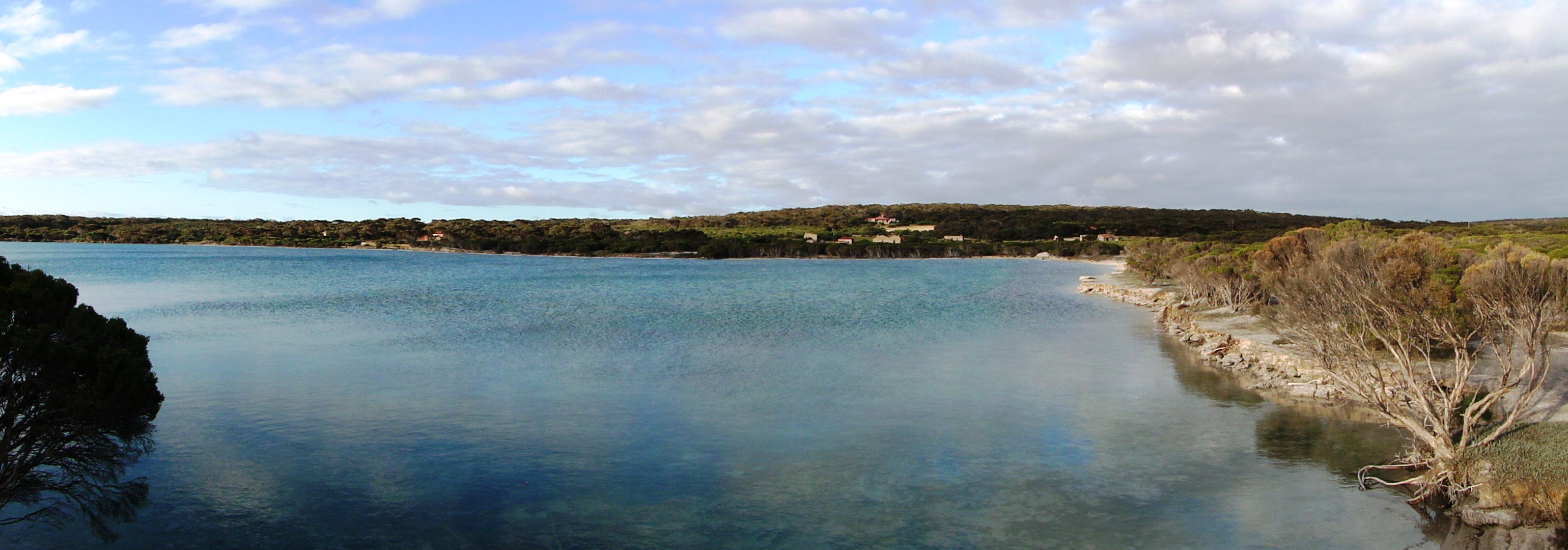
- Inneston Lake

- Coordinates: 35°16′28″S 136°53′25″E
- Population: 6 (SAL 2021)
- Established: 1999
- Postcode(s): 5577
- Time zone: ACST (UTC+9:30)
  - Summer (DST): ACST (UTC+10:30)
- Location: 155 km (96 mi) W of Adelaide
- LGA(s): Yorke Peninsula Council
- Region: Yorke and Mid North
- County: Fergusson
- State electorate(s): Narungga
- Federal division(s): Grey
Mean max temp	Mean min temp	Annual rainfall
23.1 °C; 74 °F	15 °C; 59 °F	432.8 mm 17 in
Suburbs around Inneston:
		Marion Bay
Spencer Gulf	Inneston
	Investigator Strait
- Footnotes: Location; Image caption Adjoining localities

Inneston (previously known as Cape Spencer) is a locality in the Australian state of South Australia located on the south-western end of Yorke Peninsula about 155 kilometres (96 miles) west of the state capital of Adelaide. Historically, it is notable as a site for the mining of gypsum and since 1970, the majority of the land within the current extent of the locality is within the protected area called the Dhilba Guuranda–Innes National Park.

== Description ==
Inneston is located about 155 kilometres (96 miles) west of the state capital of Adelaide. It occupies all of the land on the south western tip of Yorke Peninsula south west of a line running from Willyama Bay on the south coast of the peninsula near Marion Bay to Gym Beach on the west coast of the peninsula.

The coastline extending from Willyama Bay to Cape Spencer consists of a number of bays such as Cable Bay and Stenhouse Bay with some prominent headlands such as Rhino Head and a line of cliffs between Cable Bay and Stenhouse Bay. From Cape Spencer to West Cape, an unbroken line of cliffs ranging in height between 37 metres (121 feet) and 79 metres (259 feet) with some sandy beaches at their feet make up the south west coast of Yorke Peninsula. From West Cape to Pondalowie Bay, the cliff line is of a relatively lower height. From the south end of Pondalowie Bay to Gym Beach, areas of sand dunes dominate the shoreline and the land immediately adjoining it with the exception of Royston Head and the cliff line extending eastward to Dolphin Beach. The land between the locality’s north-eastern boundary and the coastline is dominated in part by a network of saline lakes including lakes such as Inneston Lake, Marion Lake and Spider Lake.

The locality is serviced by a road connected to the western end of the Yorke Highway which passes through Marion Bay and then Stenhouse Bay and which follows the coastline as a sealed road passing Chinamans Hat Island, Cable Bay and the turn-offs to Cape Spencer, Ethel Beach, West Cape and Pondalowie Bay. The road concludes as a sealed road at the Pondalowie Bay and continues as an unsealed road, passing turn-offs to Dolphin Beach and Shell Beach, to terminate at Browns Beach in the north west.

== History ==
=== Agriculture ===
Land within Inneston was first used in 1847 by William Burrage to graze sheep near Cape Spencer. In 1851, land in the vicinity of Cape Spencer became available for leasing and by 1855, Burrage held two leases. Water for grazing was sourced from wells fed by “natural springs.” Wells were established at Pondalowie Bay and Browns Beach during the 1850s and allowed “the establishment of sheep stations at Cape Spencer, Carribie and Stone Hut in the 1860s.” Cropping was carried out within the locality with “poor yields due to the intense coastal environment and soil infertility.” After 1927, land under cultivation increased due to “a better understanding of the importance of trace elements (mainly manganese).”

=== Mining ===
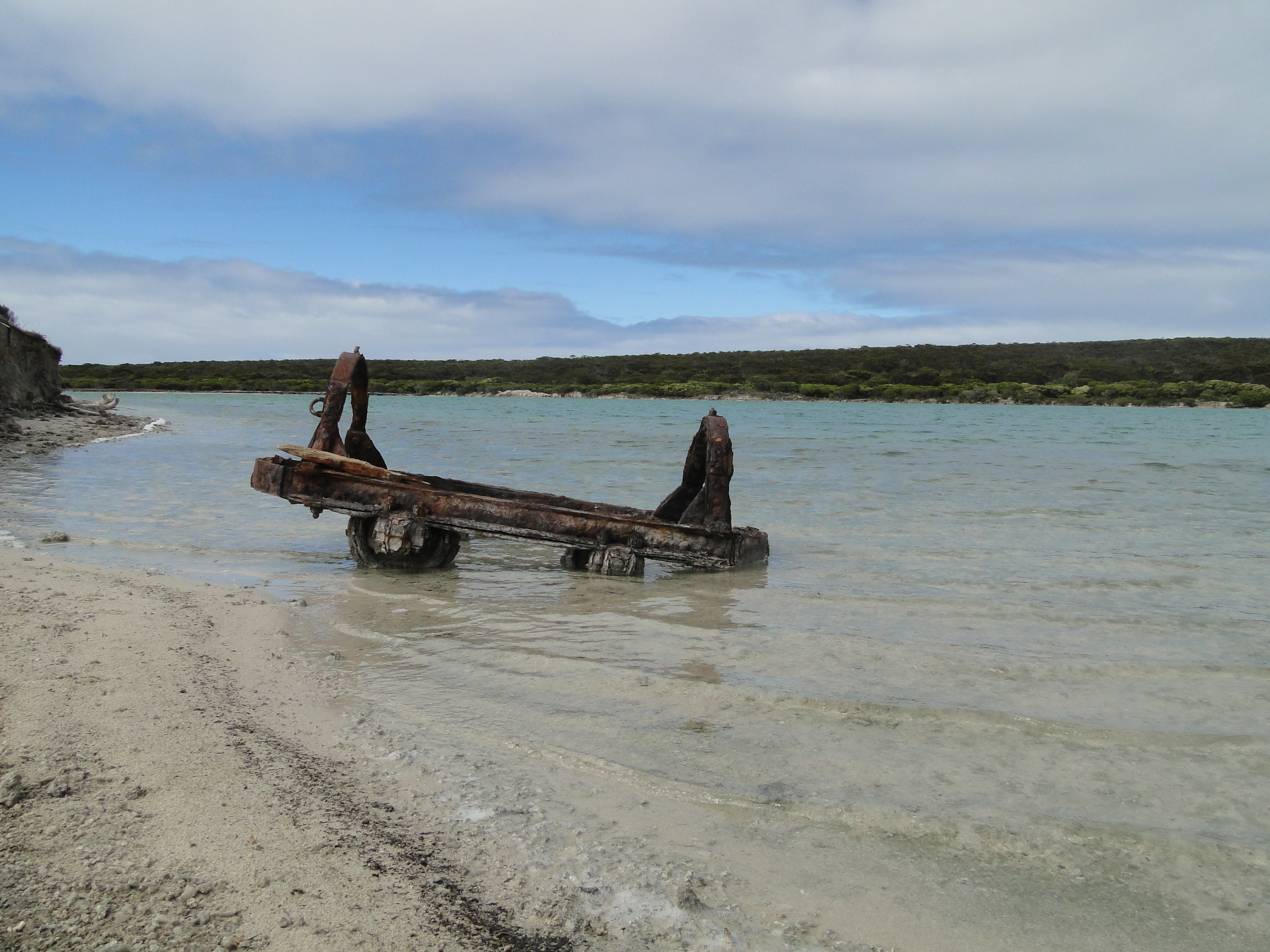
Abandoned gypsum mining equipment

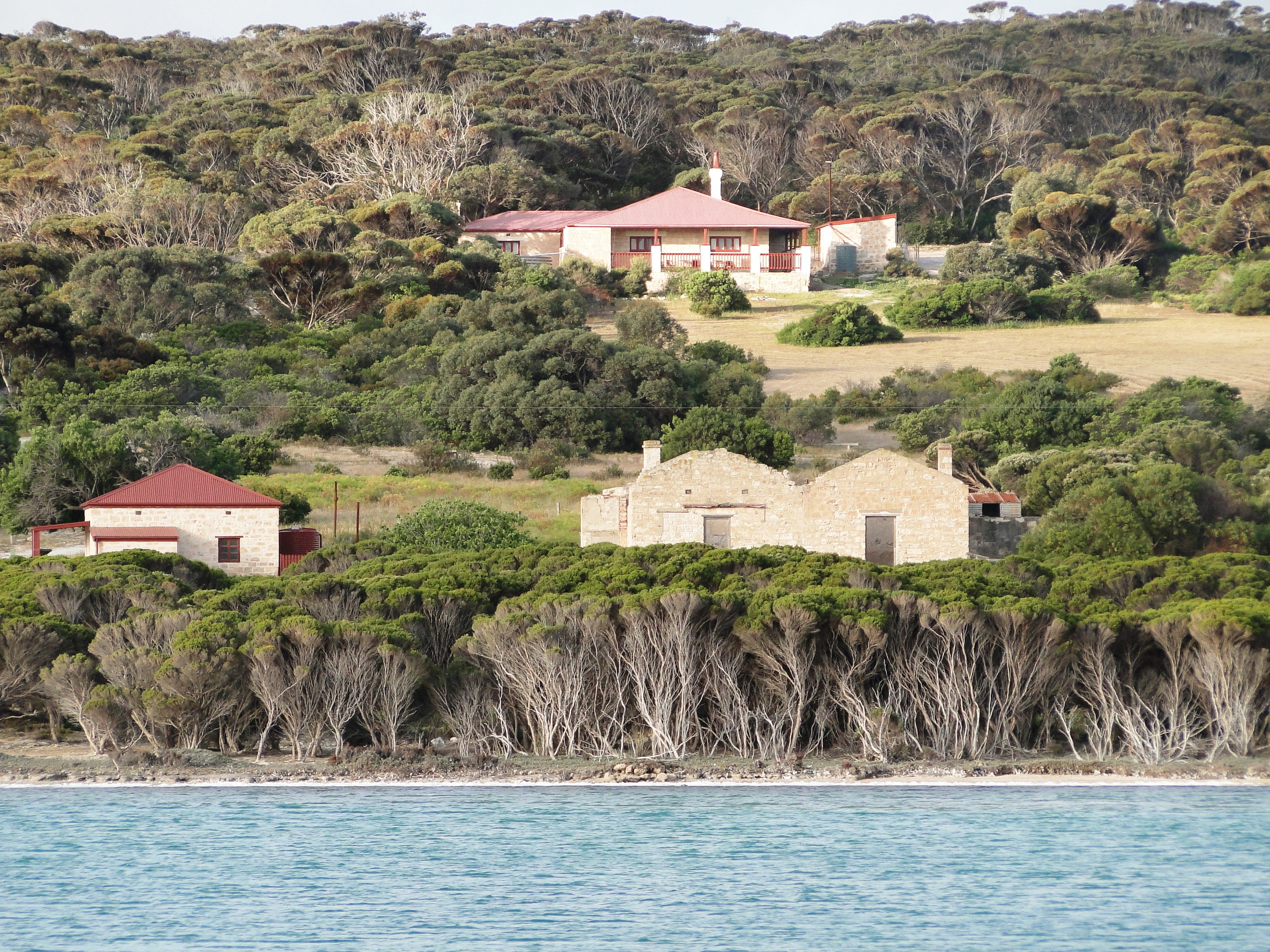
View of buildings at the abandoned mining town

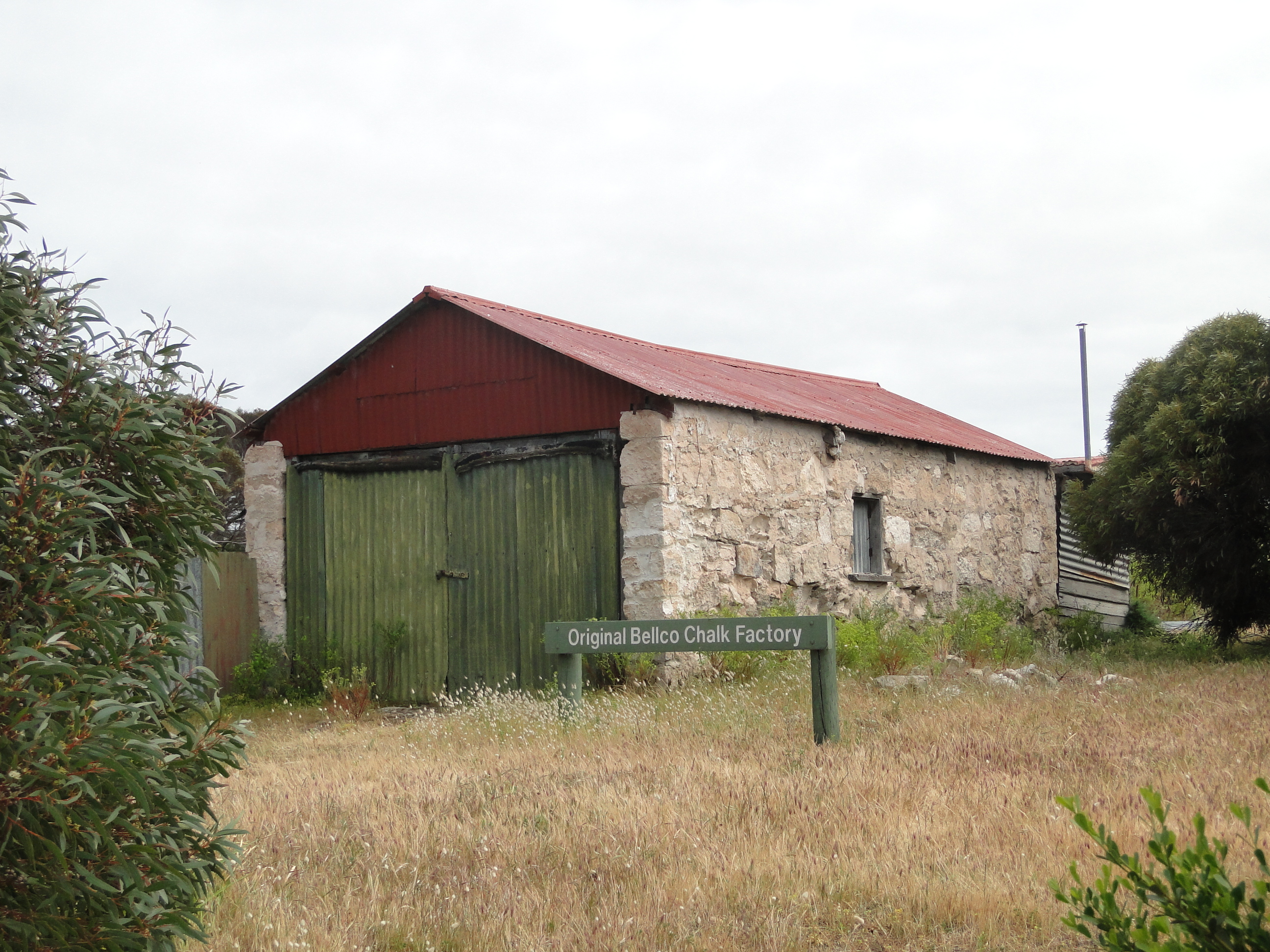
The Bellco Chalk Factory

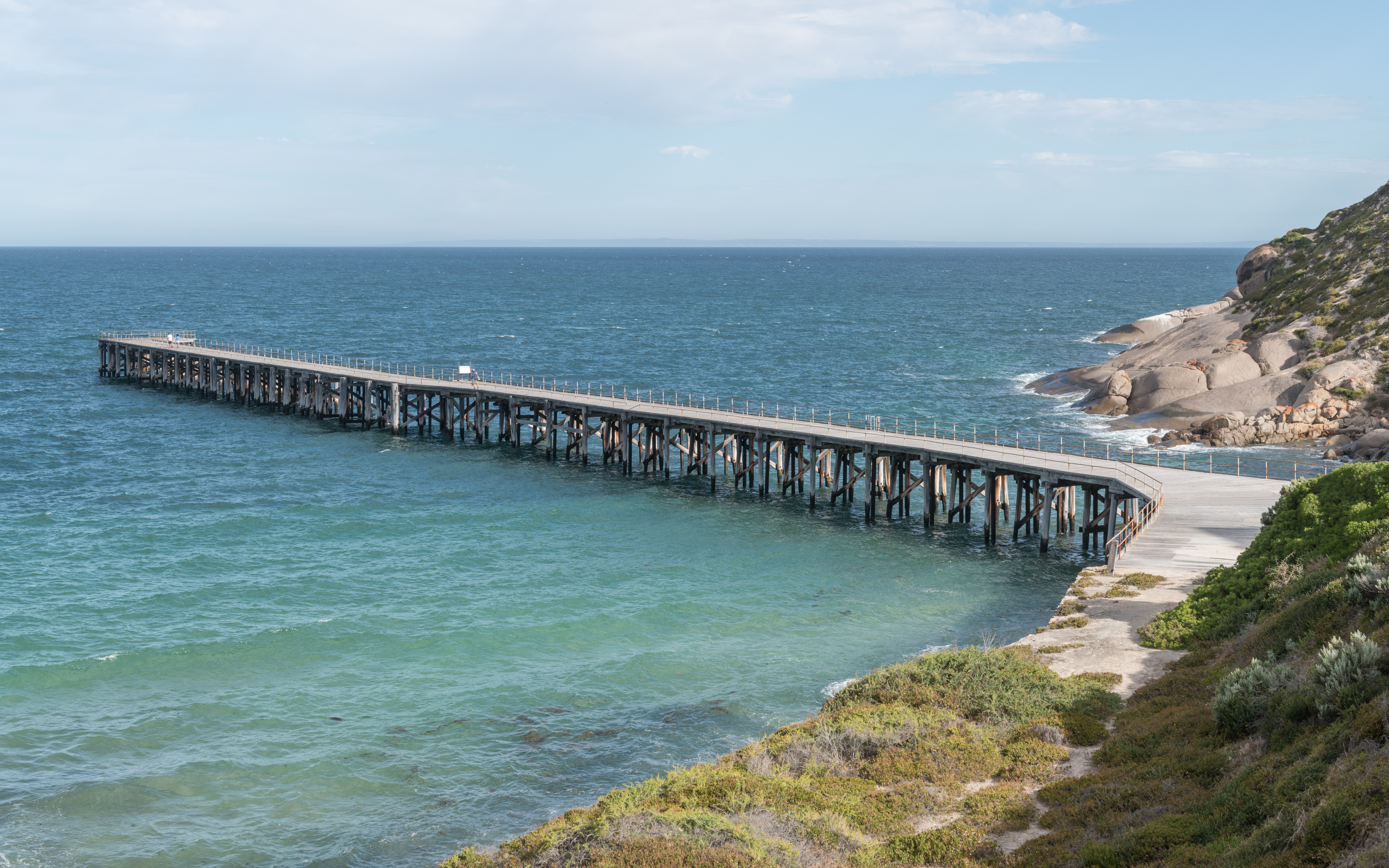
Stenhouse Bay Jetty

In 1889, the mining of gypsum began at Marion Lake by the Australian Gypsum and Whiting Company who developed infrastructure both at the lake and at the township of Marion Bay including a railway connecting both the mine and the town.

In 1913, the mining of gypsum was commenced at Inneston Lake by the Permasite Company, a Victorian enterprise owned by Messrs. Bell, Stenhouse and Innes, and who developed infrastructure at both the lake and at a settlement on the coastline that would subsequently be named as Stenhouse Bay and including a railway connecting both sites. The development at Inneston Lake grew into a town known as Inneston and which by the early 1900s has a population of about 150 people and included facilities such as “a public hall, butcher, baker, bank and post office.” Later developments included a plaster factory built in 1916, a chalk factory opened in 1922 and as of 1927, the town had “tennis court, cricket and other recreational facilities.”

Development at Stenhouse Bay included the construction of a jetty for the loading of goods onto ships. The two mining operations were consolidated under the control of one company, the Waratah Gypsum Pty Ltd, at a time during the late 1920s or the 1930s. It is reported that six million tonnes (6,000,000 long tons) of gypsum was extracted from sites at Marion, Inneston and Spider Lakes between the years 1905 and 1973. In 1970, mining continued on land not included in Innes National Park and is reported as ceasing sometime immediately prior to 2003.

=== National park ===
Land within what is now Inneston was declared under the South Australian National Parks Act 1966 as Innes National Park in 1970 to “conserve important habitat for the western whipbird, the mallee fowl and to protect a number of heritage buildings at Inneston” (sic). The national park was enlarged during the years 1977, 1984 and 1993 in “response to significant recreational use.”

== Official naming ==
Land in the locality was originally known as Cape Spencer. The mining settlement located at Inneston Lake and which was known as Inneston was officially proclaimed as a town in 1927. In 1999, boundaries were created for the “long established name.” In 2011, these boundaries were adjusted specifically to remove part of the locality and place it in the adjoining locality of Marion Bay to “ensure the whole of the residential area is located within Marion Bay.” The locality also includes the following places that are also gazetted under the South Australian Geographical Names Act 1991 - Pondalowie Bay and Stenhouse Bay.

== Land use ==
As of 2014, the majority of the land within Inneston is located within the Innes National Park which is an area zoned for “Coastal Conservation” within the remainder of the locality being zoned as “Mineral Extraction” and “Primary Production.”

The following three lakes which support a population of stromatolites are listed on the South Australian Heritage Register maintained by the South Australian Government - Deep Lake, Inneston Lake and Marion Lake.

The following places associated with the mining of gypsum at the former town of Inneston and Stenhouse Bay are listed on the South Australian Heritage Register - the Inneston Gypsum Complex and the Stenhouse Bay Jetty.

== Governance ==
Inneston is located within the federal Division of Grey, the state electoral district of Narungga and the local government area known as the Yorke Peninsula Council.

== See also ==
- List of cities and towns in South Australia
- Boral
