= West Cape (South Australia) =

West Cape Inneston, South Australia
- Coordinates: 35°14′47″S 136°49′20″E
- Elevation: 58 m (190 ft)
- Location: 14 km (9 mi) west of Marion Bay

West Cape is a headland located on the west coast of the Yorke Peninsula in South Australia in the gazetted locality of Inneston about 14 kilometres (8.7 miles) west of the town of Marion Bay. It is the most westerly point of Yorke Peninsula. Since 1970, the headland has been located within the Innes National Park while the waters adjoining its shoreline have been located within the Southern Spencer Gulf Marine Park since 2012. Since 1980, it has been the site of a navigation aid in the form of a lighthouse.
