= Cape Spencer (Antarctica) =

Cape Spencer (68°24′S 147°29′E) is an ice-covered point marking on the east the seaward end of the depression occupied by the Ninnis Glacier, located in George V Land.

It was discovered by the Australasian Antarctic Expedition (1911–1914) under Douglas Mawson. He named it in 1911 for Sir Baldwin Spencer, the Director of the National Museum in Melbourne.
