= Chinamans Hat Island =

Island in South Australia

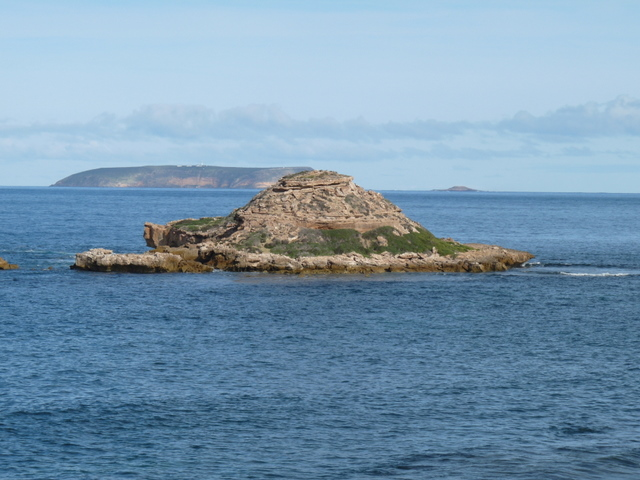
- Chinamans Hat Island as viewed from the nearby coastline

- Location within South Australia

Geography
- Location: Investigator Strait
- Coordinates: 35°17′20″S 136°55′05″E

Administration
- Australia

Chinamans Hat Island is an islet located off the south coast of Yorke Peninsula in Investigator Strait in South Australia about 2.4 kilometres (1.5 miles) south-west of Stenhouse Bay and within 350 metres (1,150 feet) of the shore. As of 2014, it is located within the Innes National Park.

== Description ==
Chinamans Hat Island is located about 350 metres (1,150 feet) from the shoreline and about 2.4 kilometres (1.5 miles) south-west of Stenhouse Bay. The islet is a remnant piece of cliff line which rises to a height of 11 metres (36 feet) and sits on an intertidal rock platform that joins the mainland at the west and extends past the island to the east. The islet is named due to the similarity of its shape to a conical Asian hat. Access is reported as being ‘best gained by small boat, taking care to avoid the shallow rocks and reefs in the surrounding waters.’ The name ‘Chinamans Hat’ is also informally used for other features near the islet such as the small bay located between it and the mainland, the intertidal reef that connects it to the mainland and facilities on the mainland provided as part of the Innes National Park.

== Formation, geology and oceanography ==
Chinamans Hat Island was formed between 7500 and 8900 years ago after sea levels rose at the start of the Holocene thereby separating Yorke Peninsula from Kangaroo Island. Chinamans Hat Island is reported as being entirely composed of a Bridgewater Formation calcarenite rock with ‘distinct horizontal layers of hard calcrete’. The islet rises from a depth of 10 metres (33 feet).

== Flora and fauna ==
=== Flora ===
A survey conducted in 1996 found eleven species of plants, including sea celery, marsh saltbush, round-leaved pigface, ruby saltbush, grey samphire, nitre-bush, bower spinach, and common iceplant.

=== Fauna ===
As of 1996, vertebrate animals were represented by bird species such as little penguins, feral pigeons and sooty oystercatchers.

== Protected areas status ==
Chinamans Hat Island has been reported as being part of the Innes National Park since 1980. Since 2012, the waters surrounding its shores have been located in a sanctuary zone within the boundaries of the South Spencer Gulf Marine Park.
