= Stenhouse Bay, South Australia =

Stenhouse Bay
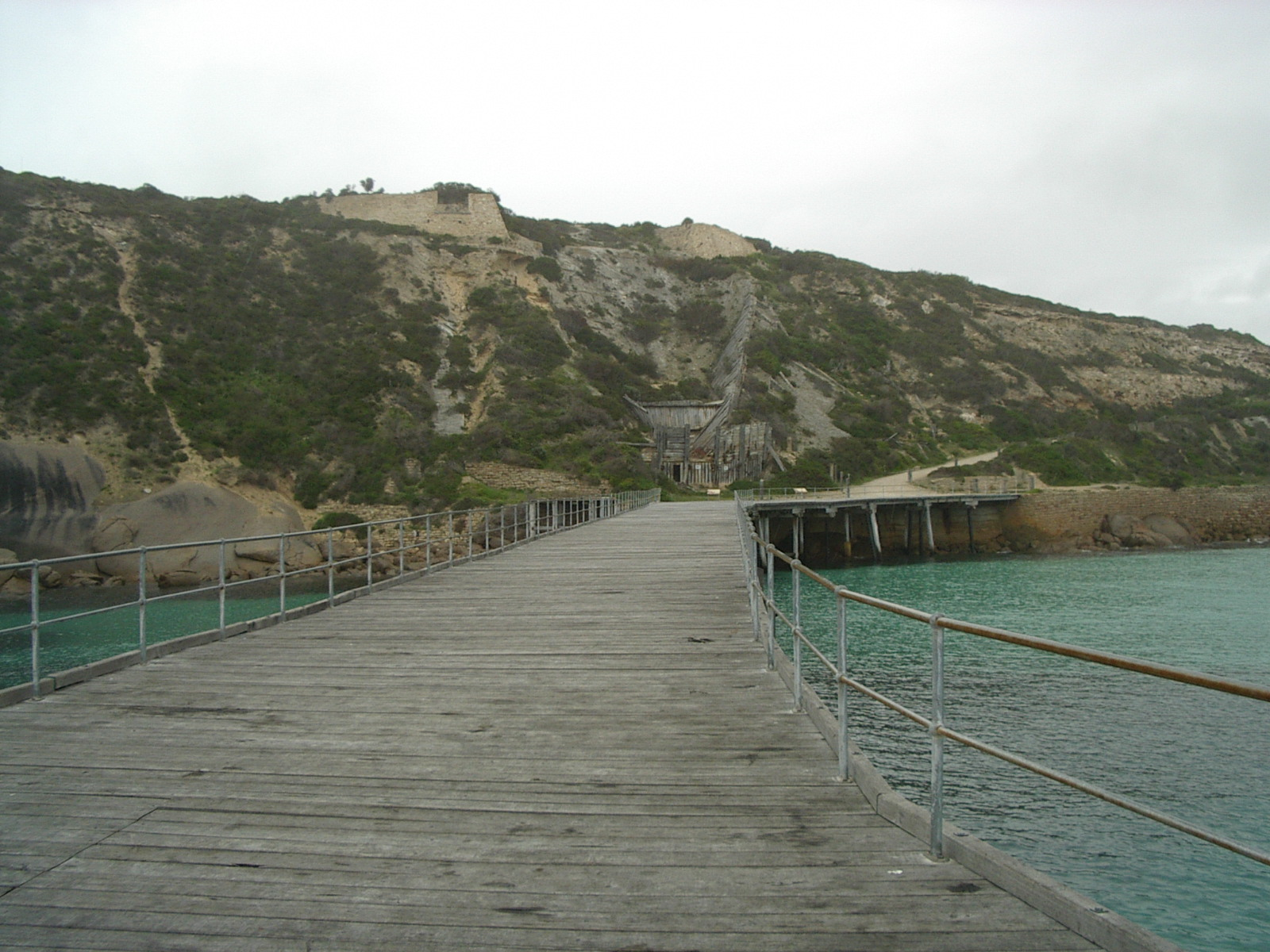

- Coordinates: 35°17′0″S 136°56′0″E
- Country: Australia
- State: South Australia
- LGA: Yorke Peninsula Council
- Location: 156 km (97 mi) from Adelaide city centre
- Established: 1920

Government
  - State electorate: Goyder
  - Federal division: Grey
- Elevation: 5.2 m (17 ft)
- Time zone: UTC+9:30 (ACST)
  - Summer (DST): UTC+10:30 (ACST)
- Postcode: 5575
- Mean max temp: 20.4 °C (68.7 °F)
- Mean min temp: 13 °C (55 °F)
- Annual rainfall: 443 mm (17.4 in)

Stenhouse Bay is a place in the Australian state of South Australia near the south-west extremity of the Yorke Peninsula located in the gazetted locality of Inneston about 156 kilometres (97 mi) west of the state capital of Adelaide.

== Naming ==
Stenhouse Bay was named after Andrew Stenhouse who was a principal of the Permasite Manufacturing Co Pty Ltd which held "leases for the harvesting of gypsum north of Cape Spencer."

Since 1999, it has been located within the locality of Inneston. Its official status as of 2013 is that of a 'locality unbounded' which is listed on the South Australian place name gazetteer with the advice that it is "not to be used as an address".

== History ==
=== Gypsum works ===
The Waratah Gypsum Company had works here for the quarrying and exporting of rock gypsum. Gypsum after being washed, roasted and ground, was used in the manufacturing of plaster of paris and cement. The quality of the gypsum in this area was exceptionally high class and most of Australia's needs were supplied from here.

The Waratah Gypsum Company closed its works and the town was sold to the South Australian Government which demolished the town except for the few houses required for the rangers of the National Parks and Wildlife Organization who look after Innes National Park.

=== Weather station ===
Stenhouse Bay has been the site of an automatic weather station since 20 November 1995.

== Climate ==
Climate data for Stenhouse Bay, elevation 42 m (138 ft), (1996–2025 normals and extremes)
Month	Jan	Feb	Mar	Apr	May	Jun	Jul	Aug	Sep	Oct	Nov	Dec	Year
Record high °C (°F)	46.7 (116.1)	44.0 (111.2)	41.9 (107.4)	36.2 (97.2)	29.8 (85.6)	25.8 (78.4)	21.8 (71.2)	27.0 (80.6)	33.2 (91.8)	37.2 (99.0)	39.9 (103.8)	43.2 (109.8)	46.7 (116.1)
Mean daily maximum °C (°F)	25.1 (77.2)	24.8 (76.6)	23.4 (74.1)	21.1 (70.0)	18.6 (65.5)	16.3 (61.3)	15.5 (59.9)	16.3 (61.3)	18.1 (64.6)	20.1 (68.2)	22.0 (71.6)	23.4 (74.1)	20.4 (68.7)
Mean daily minimum °C (°F)	16.8 (62.2)	17.1 (62.8)	16.1 (61.0)	14.1 (57.4)	12.0 (53.6)	10.1 (50.2)	9.1 (48.4)	9.4 (48.9)	10.4 (50.7)	11.8 (53.2)	13.7 (56.7)	15.1 (59.2)	13.0 (55.4)
Record low °C (°F)	11.2 (52.2)	11.1 (52.0)	10.1 (50.2)	6.8 (44.2)	4.8 (40.6)	2.5 (36.5)	3.4 (38.1)	2.9 (37.2)	4.2 (39.6)	5.0 (41.0)	7.9 (46.2)	8.6 (47.5)	2.5 (36.5)
Average precipitation mm (inches)	16.2 (0.64)	17.5 (0.69)	18.1 (0.71)	27.4 (1.08)	51.5 (2.03)	73.6 (2.90)	69.9 (2.75)	61.4 (2.42)	44.9 (1.77)	29.3 (1.15)	22.1 (0.87)	16.3 (0.64)	445.9 (17.56)
Average precipitation days (≥ 0.2 mm)	4.5	4.0	6.3	9.9	15.8	18.6	20.2	19.7	15.6	9.7	7.3	6.3	137.9
Average afternoon relative humidity (%)	57	59	59	62	66	68	68	65	63	61	59	57	62
Source: Australian Bureau of Meteorology (humidity 1991–2010)

== Innes Park Trading Post and Rhino's Tavern ==
After almost 60 years, the shop at Stenhouse Bay, trading in recent years as Innes Park Trading Post and Rhino's Tavern, was demolished before Christmas in 2013.

The iconic trading post and tavern was closed and fenced off just before the peak Christmas period. Park visitors must now travel 5 km out of the park back to Marion Bay for fuel, camping goods and a restaurant meal. The closure meant the department lost between $30,000 and $50,000 in annual lease revenue.

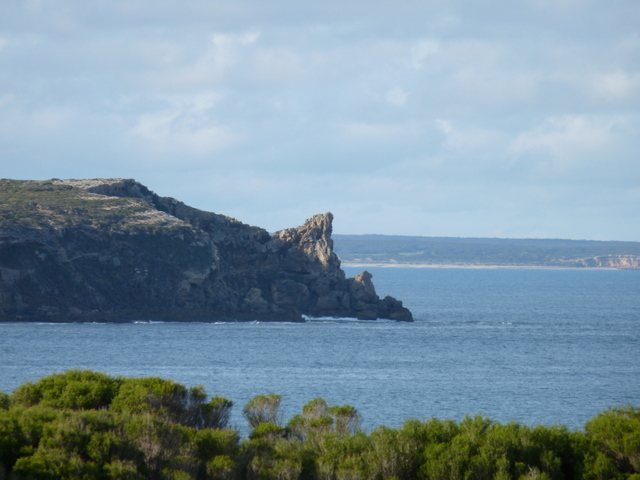
Rhino Head at the eastern end of Stenhouse Bay

== See also ==
- Hougomont (barque)
