= Marion Bay, South Australia =

Marion Bay South Australia
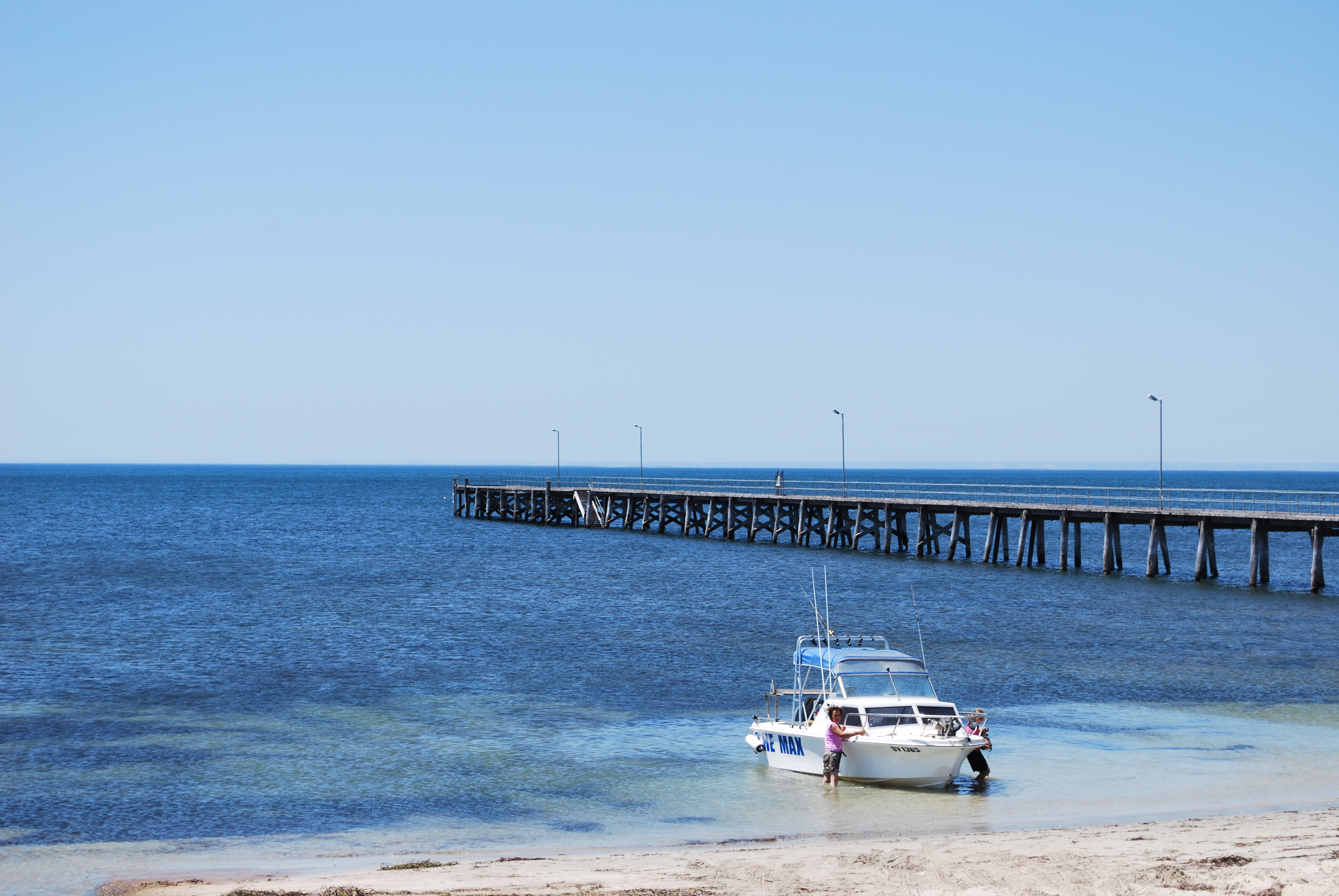
- Jetty at Marion Bay

- Coordinates: 35°14′31″S 136°58′41″E
- Population: 210 (SAL 2021)
- Established: 1872
- Postcode(s): 5575
- Location: 151 km (94 mi) SW of Adelaide
- LGA(s): Yorke Peninsula Council
- Region: Yorke and Mid North
- County: Fergusson
- State electorate(s): Narungga
- Federal division(s): Grey
Mean max temp	Mean min temp	Annual rainfall
20.3 °C; 69 °F	13.0 °C; 55 °F	432.8 mm 17 in
Localities around Marion Bay:
Spencer Gulf	White Hut	Warooka
Spencer Gulf; Inneston	Marion Bay	Foul Bay
Inneston	Investigator Strait	Investigator Strait
- Footnotes: Location; Adjoining localities

Marion Bay is a small township in the Australian state of South Australia at the southern tip of the Yorke Peninsula.

== Description ==
It is surrounded by beaches and is the gateway to the Dhilba Guuranda–Innes National Park. The close proximity of the beach and cliffs have popularized Marion Bay as a fishing destination, with Brown Beach in the nearby Innes National Park being particularly famous among recreational fisherman as a picturesque fishing destination.

== Water supply ==
In 2008, a desalination plant was commissioned to meet the water demands of the summer tourist season. A 60 kL/d sea water reverse osmosis plant now supplies the local caravan park, residents and businesses. The plant was commissioned in response to declining bore water quality and associated problems of corrosion. The plant was designed and constructed by Osmoflo.

== Governance ==
Marion Bay is located within the federal Division of Grey, the state electoral district of Narungga and the local government area known as the Yorke Peninsula Council.

== In popular culture ==
Marion Bay features in Tricia Stringer's 2020 novel The family inheritance.

== See also ==
- List of cities and towns in South Australia
- Warrenben Conservation Park
