= Hougomont (barque) =

Four-masted steel barque

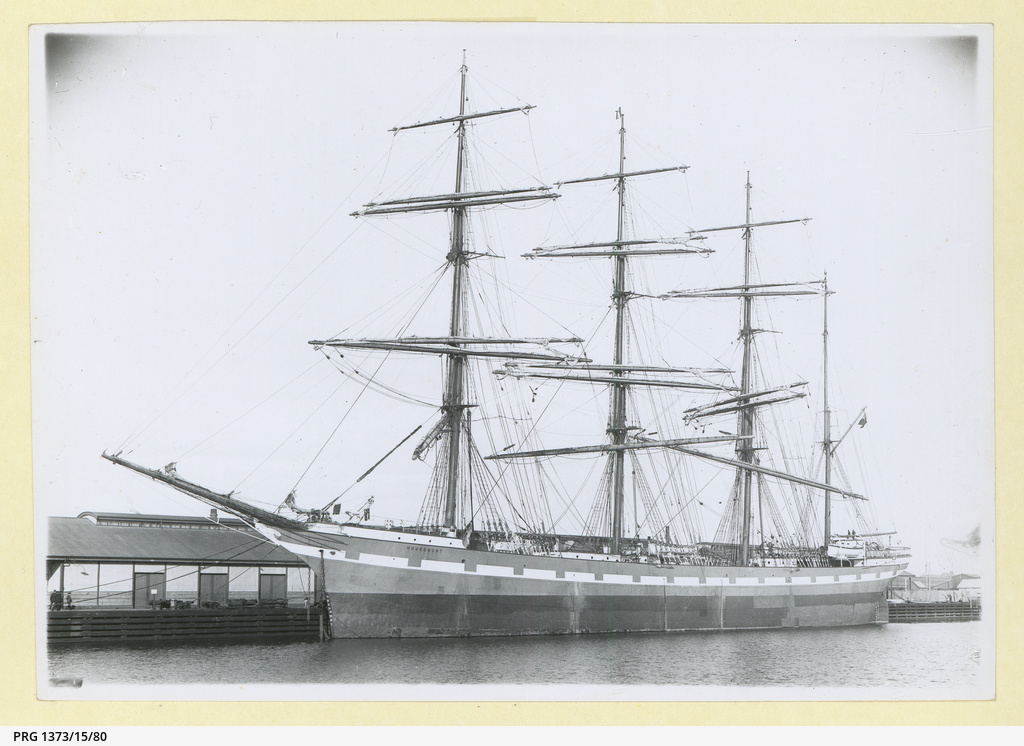
- Hougomont docked in an unidentified port circa 1900 (State Library of South Australia PRG 1373-15-80)

History
- Name: Hougomont
- Operator: Gustaf Erikson
- Builder: Scott Shipbuilding and Engineering Company, Greenock, Scotland
- Completed: 1897
- Fate: Scuttled 8 January 1933 in Stenhouse Bay
- Status: historic shipwreck

General characteristics
- Type: Barque
- Tonnage: 2378
- Length: 292 ft 3 in (89.08 m)
- Beam: 43 ft 4 in (13.21 m)
- Draught: 23 ft 11 in (7.29 m)

Hougomont was the name of a four-masted steel barque built in Greenock, Scotland in 1897 by Scotts Shipbuilding & Engineering Co. In 1924 she was purchased by Gustav Erikson's shipping company in Mariehamn, Åland, Finland. She was used for transport and schooling ship for young sailors until 1932 when a squall completely broke her rig on the Southern Ocean and she was sunk as breakwater near the town of Stenhouse Bay in South Australia.

Hougomont had a crew of 24 men. The name "Hougomont" is derived from Château d'Hougoumont where the Battle of Waterloo was fought. While seaworthy she sailed to Peru, Florida, Canada, Australia, England, Ireland, and Sweden among other destinations. She had two sister ships, Nivelle (stranded in 1906) and Archibald Russell.

== History ==
Hougomont was unfortunate and damaged on several occasions while at sea.

In March 1903 she ran aground at Allonby on the Cumbrian coast. She was bound for Liverpool from San Francisco and had been driven off course by heavy weather. Her cargo included 32,000 cases of tinned pears and 24,000 cases of salmon, which the villagers of Allonby 'harvested' from the shore.

In 1910 nine men were washed overboard when a rogue wave hit her stern in a hurricane. Five of the men were washed back on board by the next wave, but the remaining four were never seen again. In November 1927 her rig sustained damage in the Bay of Biscay, and she took refuge at the port of Lisbon, Portugal, where she was repaired in order to continue her voyage to Melbourne, Australia. In 1931 several of her sails were torn to shreds in a storm near Cape Horn.

On 20 April 1932 at 01:00 she was dismasted by a squall in a storm in the Southern Ocean 950 kilometres (590 miles) south of Cape Borda in South Australia. She was at the time on her 111th day at sea, carrying deadweight, on her way to a port in Spencer Gulf, west of Adelaide, Australia. The wreckage of the damaged rig battered the ship severely and it took the crew 30 hours to free her from it. She was coincidentally spotted by a steamer that wirelessly telegraphed about the distress to Adelaide, and the steam tug Wato was sent to assist. However, by the time Wato had reached Hougomont, Hougomont′s crew had managed to build a jury rig and she was sailing slowly forward. Her captain, Ragnar Lindholm, refused all offers of assistance from the tug as he wanted to avoid salvage fees.

Nineteen days later, on 8 May 1932, she reached the anchorage immediately off Semaphore in Adelaide. It was estimated that she was damaged beyond repair, so everything valuable on her was removed and shipped to Mariehamn on Herzogin Cecilie in December 1932. She was sold to the Waratah Gypsum Company for scuttling as a breakwater. In January 1933, Wato towed her to Stenhouse Bay for scuttling. She was scuttled there on 8 January 1933.

Today she lies 9 metres (30 feet) underwater in Stenhouse Bay. Her stern and prow are still standing somewhat upright, but most of her hull has collapsed. Her figurehead, a blonde lady dressed in a white gown, is displayed in Åland Maritime Museum in Mariehamn. The wreck site is officially located at 35°16′52.81″S 136°56′40.99″E.

== Technical facts ==
Tonnage: 2074 grt Dimensions: 89 x 13,2 x 7,3 m
Material: steel
Date of launch: 3 June 1897
Deadweight tonnage: 4000

== See also ==
- List of shipwrecks of Australia
