= Cape Spencer (South Australia) =

Cape Spencer South Australia
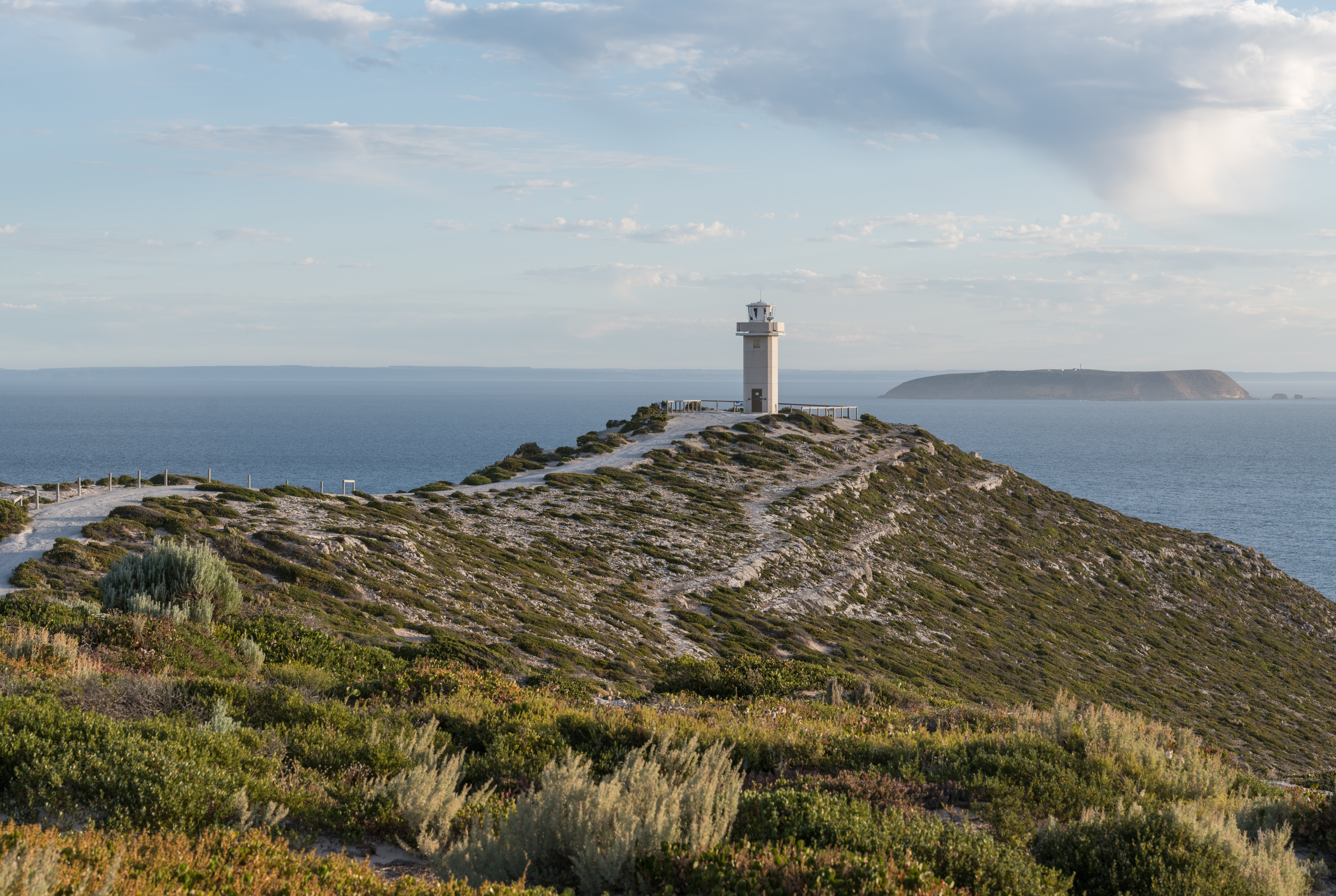
- Path to Cape Spencer lighthouse, Innes National Park

- Coordinates: 35°18′0″S 136°53′0″E
- Elevation: 79 m (259 ft)
- LGA(s): Yorke Peninsula Council
Mean max temp	Mean min temp	Annual rainfall
20.3 °C; 69 °F	12.9 °C; 55 °F	435.2 mm 17.1 in
- Footnotes: Climate

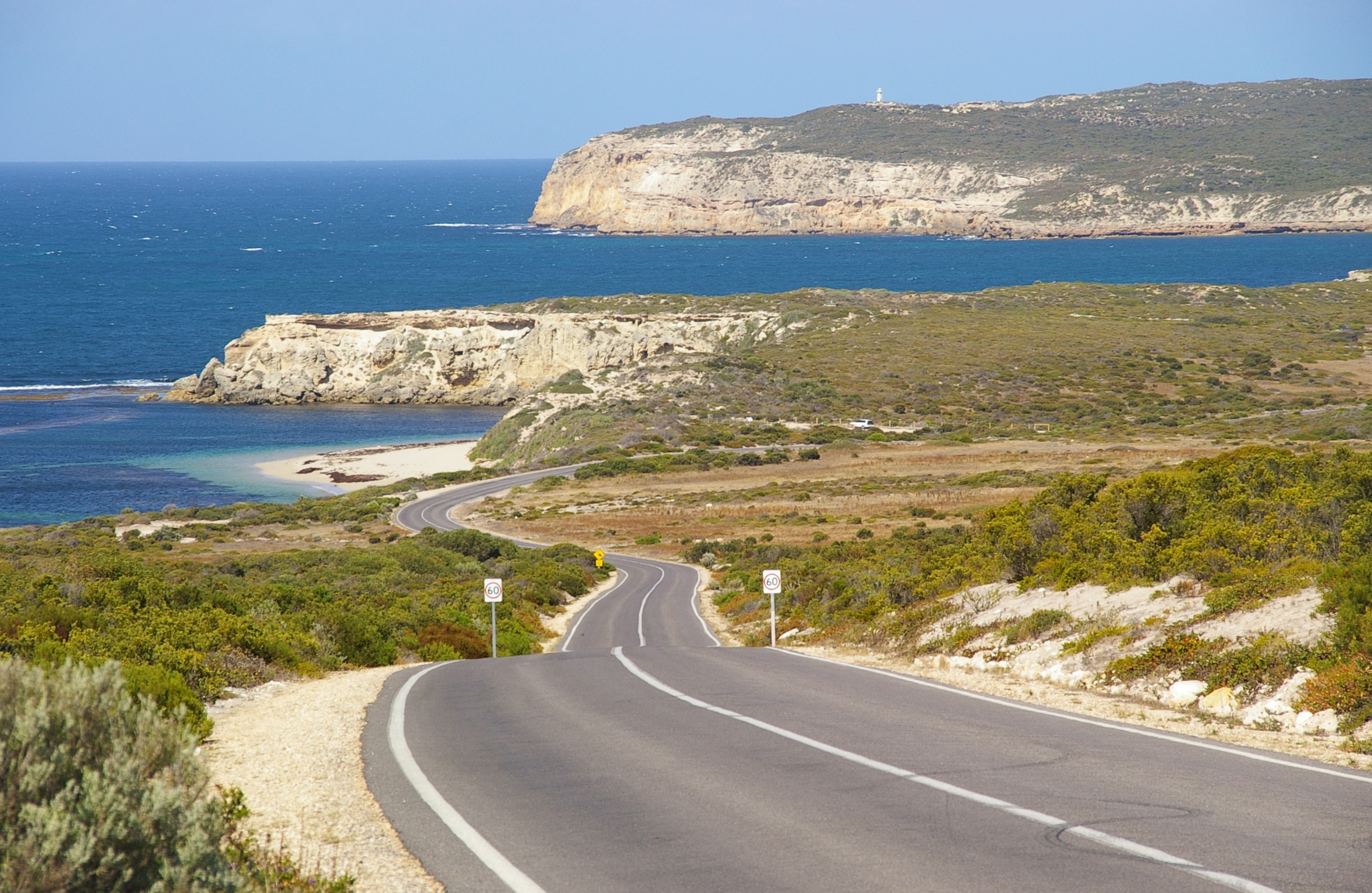
Innes National Park, looking west towards Cape Spencer

Cape Spencer is a headland in the Australian state of South Australia located on the south west tip of Yorke Peninsula in the gazetted locality of Inneston. It was named after George Spencer, 2nd Earl Spencer by Matthew Flinders during March 1802. It has been the site of an operating navigation aid since 1950 and has been located within the Innes National Park since 1970.

== Description ==
Cape Spencer is located about 125 kilometres (78 miles) south west of the municipal seat of Maitland in the gazetted locality of Inneston. It is the most south westerly point of the Yorke Peninsula coast and defined by Flinders as being the eastern side of the mouth of Spencer Gulf. It is the termination for a pair of coastlines - the western coastline extending from Corny Point in the nouth and the southern coastline extending from Troubridge Point in the east. It is described as appearing ‘as a cone with a ledge of rocks at its base’ when viewed from the south. Cape Spencer is accessible via a walking trail from within the Innes National Park. Access extends to the area around the Cape Spencer Lighthouse where views of both the adjoining coastline and nearby islands are available and the presence of interpretative signage provides information about the locality’s maritime history.

== Formation, geology & oceanography ==
Cape Spencer was formed when the sea reached its present level 7,500 years ago after sea levels started to rise at the start of the Holocene. The cliff line which includes Cape Spencer consists of base strata of both Gleesons Landing Granite and Tourneforte Metadolerite with an overlay of a Bridgewater Formation calcarenite rock. The water adjoining the wave-cut platform at the base of Cape Spencer drops to a maximum depth of 14.8 metres (49 feet).

== History ==
=== European discovery ===
Cape Spencer was named on 20 March 1802 by Matthew Flinders after George Spencer, 2nd Earl Spencer who was one of the Lords Commissioners of the Admiralty in office at the time of the planning of the expedition to New Holland, or Terra Australis as Flinders called the continent in his book, A Voyage to Terra Australis. The cape was subsequently also named by the Baudin expedition to Australia as Pointe Mornay or Pointe des Malfaisants (English: 'Point of Evil').

== Navigation aid and allied facilities ==
The current concrete lighthouse was built in 1975 to replace a small automatic beacon erected in 1950. The cape is also the site of a high frequency radar station which is used to collect data about wind direction and wave height.

== Protected area status ==
Cape Spencer has been located within the protected area known as the Innes National Park since the park's declaration in 1970. As of 2012, the waters surrounding its shores are within the boundaries of a habitat protection zone within the Southern Spencer Gulf Marine Park.

== See also ==
- Cape Spencer (disambiguation)
