= List of little penguin colonies =

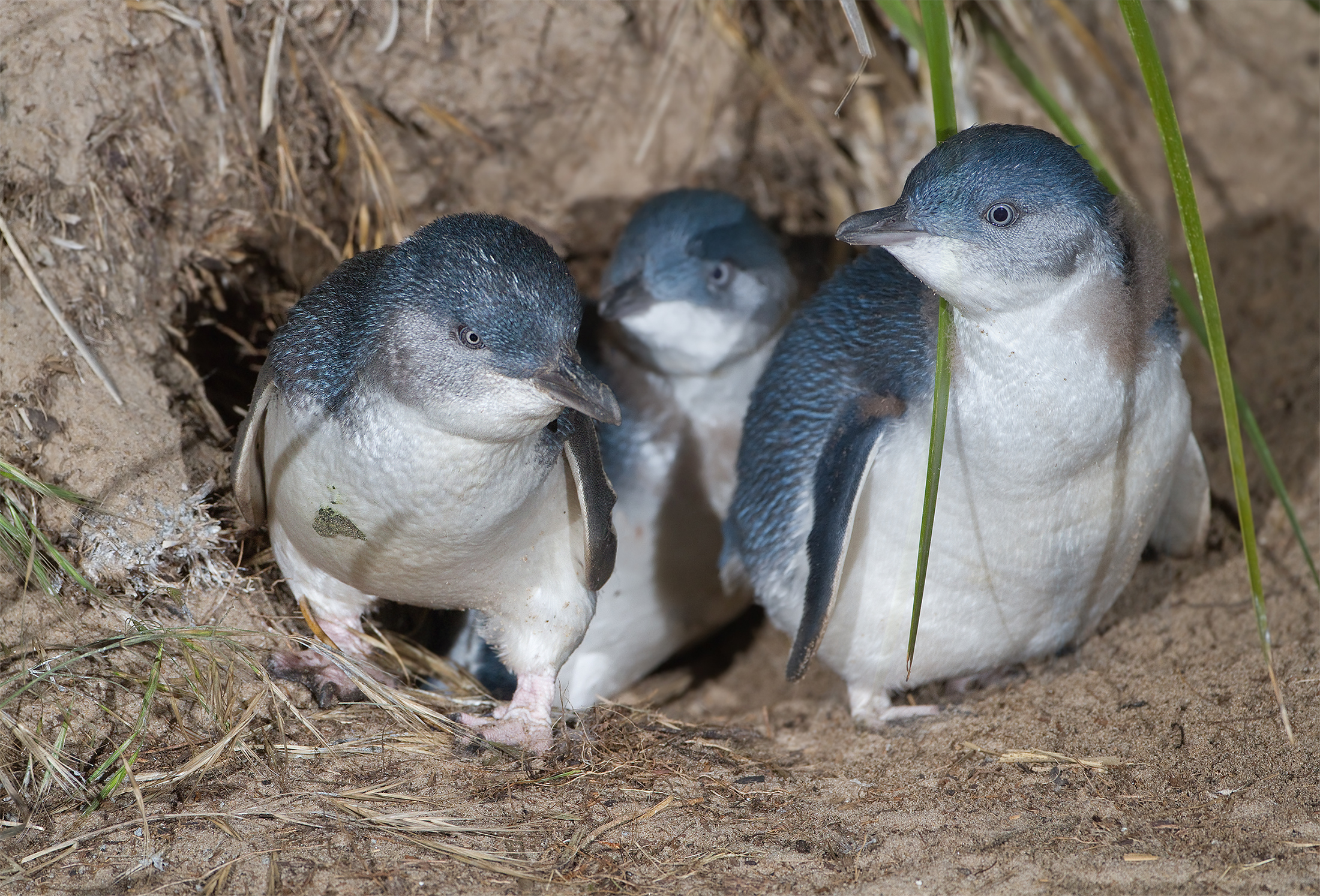
Australian little penguins exiting a burrow, Bruny Island, Tasmania, Australia

This is a list of little penguin colonies notable for their size, location or public profile. It is not exhaustive. Some little penguin (Eudyptula minor) colonies are particularly large, well-known, or are tourist attractions; even small colonies in urban areas may attract tours. Little penguins, also known as little blue or fairy penguins, exhibit site fidelity to their breeding colonies and nesting sites over successive years. They live year-round in large or small colonies, with each individual breeding pair forming a burrow, or using caves or crevices between rocks, in which to raise their chicks (of which two are born at a time, usually about two days apart).

Although many breed in large, well-defined colonies, the penguins also occur in scattered locations along long stretches of coastline. In New Zealand numerous beaches, bays and coves are host to penguin colonies. Colony sizes may range from thousands to just a few nests, with some penguins ranging into urban areas. The total population is estimated to lie between 350,000 and 600,000 individuals. Most of these breed on offshore islands where they are not subject to predation by introduced mammals, nor to regular disturbance by people, and are relatively secure. Many colonies on the Australian mainland, as well as on the coasts of Tasmania and New Zealand's North and South Islands, are in decline.

== Tourism ==
Little penguins typically return to their colonies to feed their chicks after sunset, which is when they are most visible to people and where tourist attention is focussed. Little penguins attract large numbers of tourists in Australia, and are important in several local economies. However, penguin tourism can also affect penguin breeding success through causing adults to desert nests and chicks to receive fewer meals.

== Predation ==
Little penguins were once common along the southern coastline of mainland Australia but are now primarily confined to various small islands and isolated coastal locations due to predation by introduced feral and domestic cats, foxes or, in New Zealand, stoats and ferrets, and stray dogs on the mainland. The birds and their nests are also preyed on by native animals such as goannas and, in the vicinity of the colonies at sea, by fur seals. Where roads pass close to colonies, they may be killed by cars.

Due to their diminutive size, the introduction of predators and the spread of human settlement, some colonies have been reduced in size by as much as 98% in just a few years. An example is the small colony on Middle Island, near Warrnambool, Victoria, which was reduced from 5,000 penguins to 100; a subsequent conservation management program using Maremma sheepdogs to guard the colony and deter foxes allowed numbers to start to recover.

== Australia ==
Little penguin habitats in Australia

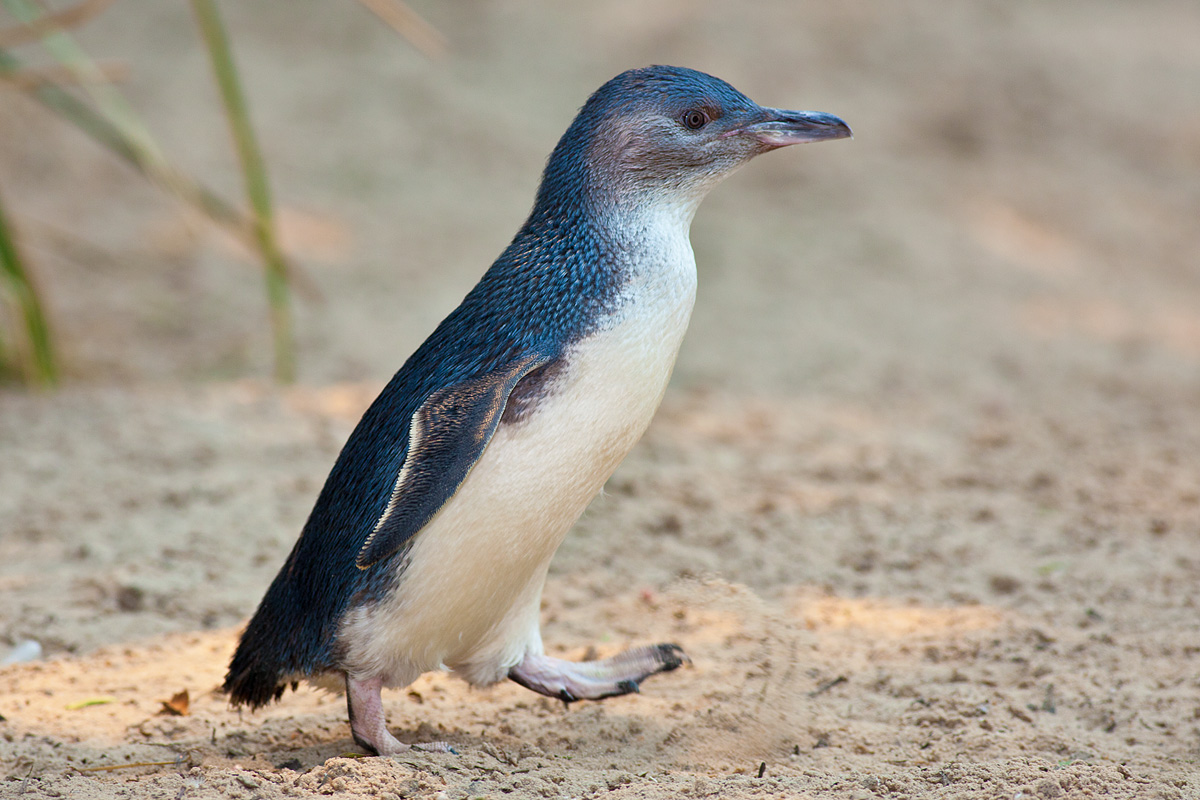
A little penguin walking

=== Jervis Bay Territory ===
Colonies in the Jervis Bay Territory include:

- Bowen Island - 5000 pairs, restricted access

=== New South Wales ===
Colonies in New South Wales include from the north:

- Boondelbah Island, Cabbage Tree Island and Broughton Island, near Port Stephens - four small colonies constituting the most northerly breeding site of the species, restricted access
- Lion Island - 300 pairs, nesting site threatened by invasive weeds, island subject to environmental rehabilitation program, restricted access
- Manly Point - small, threatened urban colony in Sydney Harbour
- Five Islands Nature Reserve - offshore from Port Kembla. Over 1000 occupied burrows in 1962, significant decline noted in 1990s.
- Barunguba / Montague Island - up to 8000 pairs, largest NSW colony, tours conducted
- Twofold Bay - small mainland colony in the Eagles Claw Nature Reserve adjacent to the town of Eden. This colony has gone extinct.

=== South Australia ===
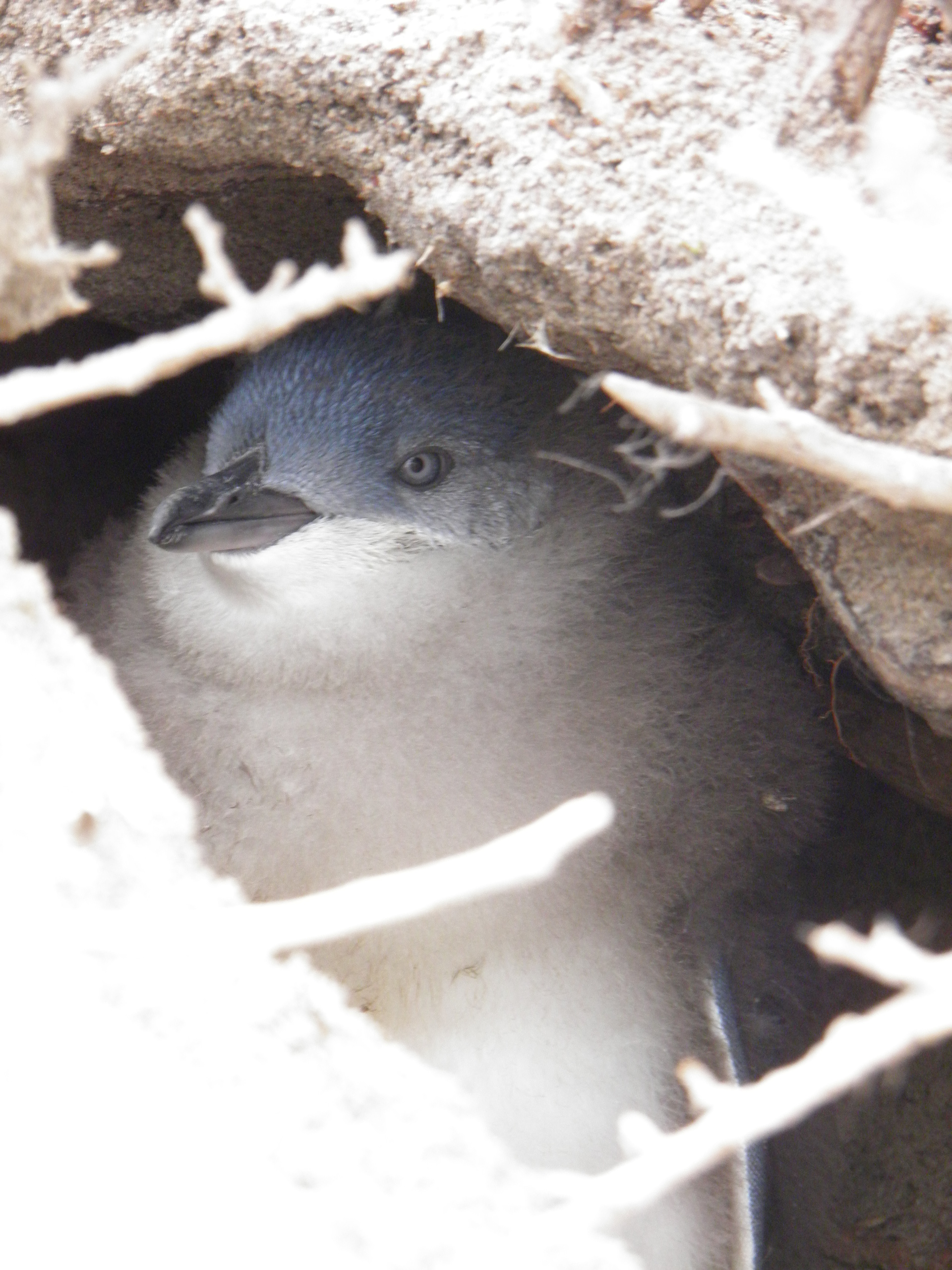
Fairy penguin in burrow on Lipson Island, Spencer Gulf, South Australia

Colonies in South Australia include:

- Althorpe Islands - Group of islands in Investigator Strait, southwest of Yorke Peninsula
- Goose Island, Little Goose Island & White Rock Island - aquatic reserve
- Granite Island, Victor Harbor - colony in possibly terminal decline, from 1600 to 1800 individuals in 2000 to about 20 in 2012; reported as 28 in 2023.
- Greenly Island - Island offshore from Coffin Bay in the Great Australian Bight
- Investigator Group - colonies on Dorothee Island, Pearson Island which was surveyed as having approximately 12,000 birds in 2004 and the Waldegrave Islands.
- Kangaroo Island
1. Kingscote - about 700 individuals in 2010, guided tours were given each evening, but stopped in 2013
2. Penneshaw - small, declining colony threatened by fur seal predation, evening guided tours
3. Flinders Chase National Park - "thousands" inhabiting the park's shores, reported in 1972. Current status unknown.
4. Ravine de Casoars - population described as "innumerable" in 1972. Current status unknown.
5. Sandy Creek - "dozens" inhabiting limestone caves, reported in 1972. Current status unknown.
- Lipson Island, north of Tumby Bay, Eyre Peninsula - colony appears to be stable at around 100 animals.
- Louth Bay (Louth Island and Rabbit Island) - status unknown, previously a large colony in the 1800s
- Royston Island, in Pondalowie Bay at the south-west end of Yorke Peninsula - as of 1982, the species was reported as being “most numerous” on the island. As of 2011, the status of the breeding colony was not known.
- Sir Joseph Banks Group - island group in Spencer Gulf supporting multiple colonies - some in decline, others of unknown status
- Thistle Island - large island in southern Spencer Gulf
- Troubridge Island, off Edithburgh, Yorke Peninsula in Gulf St Vincent - formerly 3000-6000 individuals. In 2013, colony was believed to be in decline, with an estimated total population of 270 breeding adults; this number had recovered to around 450 adults by 2016–2018, but believed to be one of the largest little penguin colonies in SA. Access is by permit.
- Wardang Island - formerly the largest colony in Spencer Gulf. Population status is unknown.
- Wedge Island

=== Tasmania ===
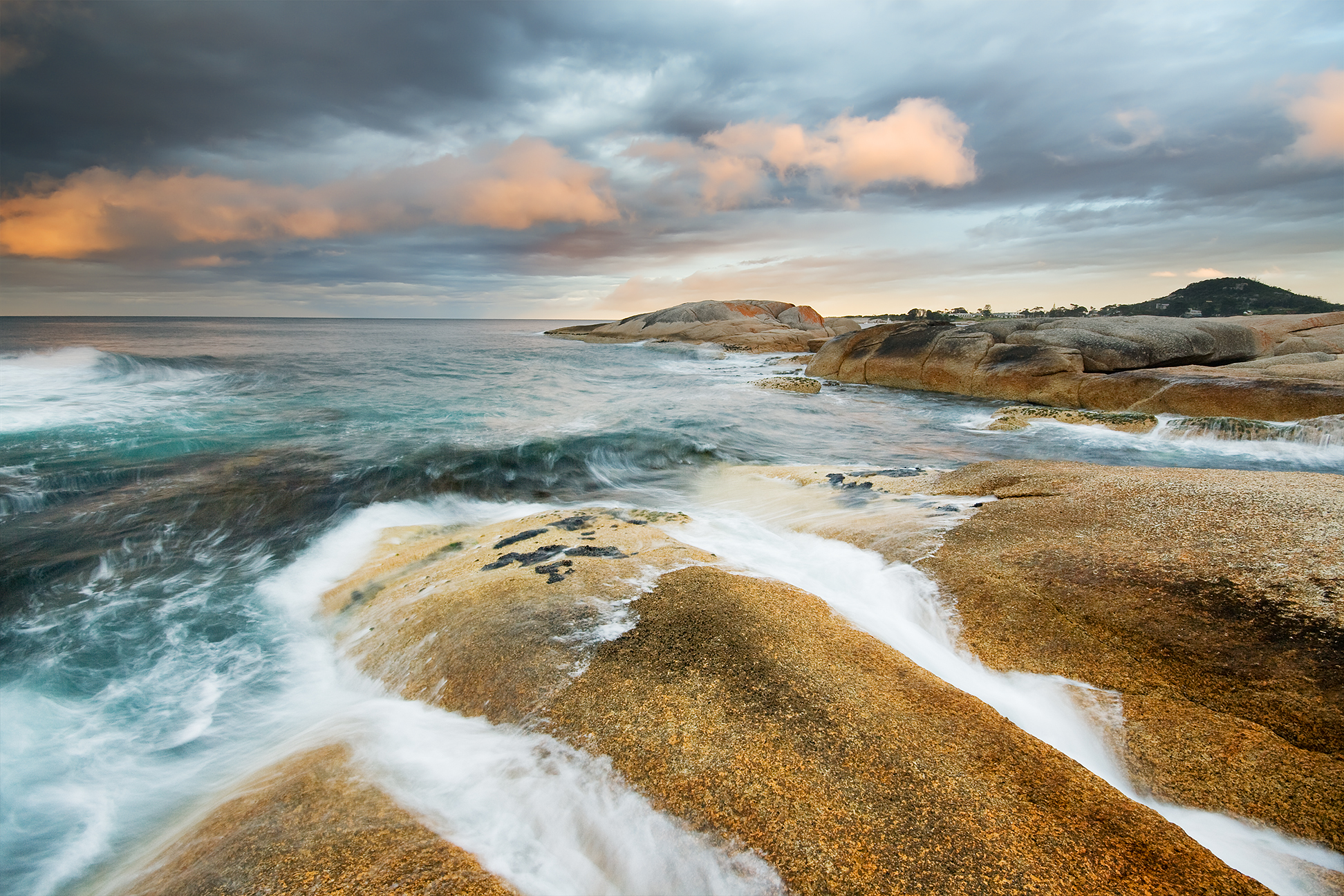
Image of the coast of Bicheno, Tasmania. The growth of red lichen gives these rocks a red colour.

Colonies in Tasmania include:

- Bicheno - colony of 200 pairs on Diamond Island adjacent to and accessible from the town; tours available
- Bruny Island - declining colony of about 400 pairs at the Neck (sandy isthmus between North and South Bruny Island) attracts large numbers of tourists to its viewing platforms
- Burnie - observation centre and tours
- De Witt Island - 500 pairs; part of the Maatsuyker Island Group Important Bird Area (IBA)
- Goat Island - part of the Three Sisters - Goat Island Nature Reserve
- Lillico Beach near Devonport - small colony; viewing facilities
- Low Head - small colony; guided tours
- Port Davey Islands Important Bird Area - over 16,000 pairs spread over several small islands in the Southwest National Park; access difficult
- St Helens Important Bird Area - up to 15,000 pairs at various sites around the fishing and holiday town of St Helens; tours available
- Wynyard - tours available by appointment
- Preservation Bay - Small colony
- Babel Island - 20,000 pairs; IBA; access difficult
- Betsey Island - 15,000 pairs; nature reserve and IBA
- Chalky, Big Green and Badger Island Groups Important Bird Area - over 40,000 pairs spread over several islands in the Furneaux Group
- Forsyth, Passage and Gull Island Important Bird Area - 80,000 pairs

=== Victoria ===
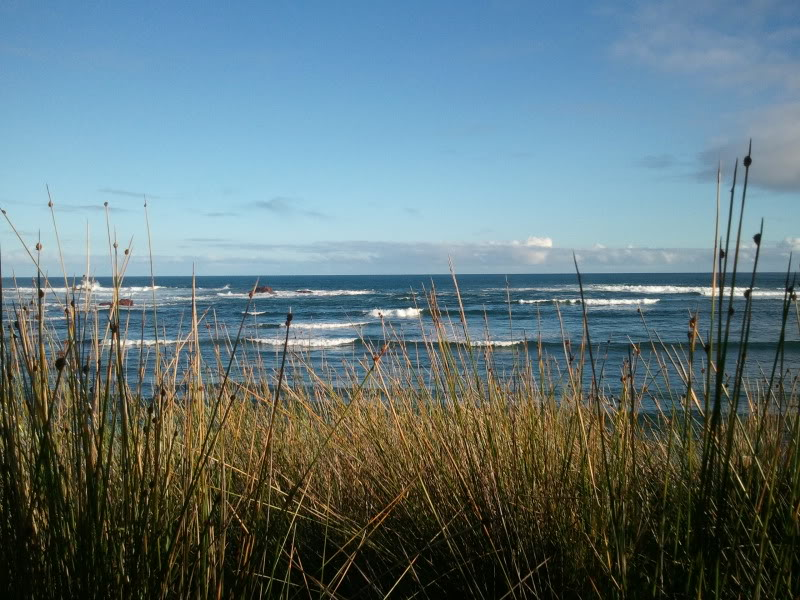
The coast of Phillip Island

Colonies in Victoria, Australia include:

- Gabo Island - up to 20,000 pairs
- Lady Julia Percy Island - 2,000 breeding pairs
- London Bridge beach, Port Campbell National Park - small colony; tours and viewing platforms
- Middle Island - small, threatened colony protected by innovative conservation program using sheepdogs; restricted access
- Phillip Island - 70,000 individuals; iconic colony and major Australian tourist attraction operating since 1928
- St Kilda Harbour Breakwater - small urban colony of approximately 1400 individuals

=== Western Australia ===
Colonies in Western Australia include:

- 6-mile Island, Israelite Bay
- Bald Island
- Carnac Island, near Perth and north of Garden Island. Status unknown.
- Coffin Island northeast of King George Sound
- Daw Island, 150 km east of Condingup
- Doubtful Islands
- Eclipse Island (south of Albany)
- Flinders Bay - Seal Island and St Alouarn Island
- Garden Island, 6.5 km north of Penguin Island. Estimated 500-600 birds in monitored areas in 2011.
- King George Sound - islands including Michelmas Island, Mistaken Island, Seal Island and Breaksea Island. Breaksea Island mentioned in an historical account from 1827, current status unknown.
- Pasley Island
- Penguin Island, near Perth, has the state's largest population. The population was estimated at 1,000 birds in 2011, but has since significantly declined to approximately 100 penguins. It is part of Shoalwater Islands Marine Park.
- Quagering Island
- Newdegate Island, at the mouth of Deep River. Historical account, current status unknown.
- Recherche Archipelago - numerous islands including Cull Island, Figure of 8 Island, Hood Island, Mackenzie Island, Mondrain Island, Observatory Island, Ram Island, Remark Island, Sandy Hook Island, South East Isles, Wilson Island (present in 2001) and Woody Island (which supports a colony of unknown size at the island's Eastern end).
- Shelter Island, near Torbay. Historic account, current status unknown. Skin of a specimen also collected there in 1988.

== New Zealand ==
Colonies in New Zealand include:

- Oamaru - >1,000 individuals
- Pipikaretu Beach, on Otago Peninsula
- Pōhatu Marine Reserve, on Banks Peninsula (white-flippered variety)
- Taiaroa Head
- Motunau Island Nature Reserve - approximately 1,650 nests, access restricted
- Matiu/Somes, Mākaro, and Mokopuna Islands in Wellington Harbour (Te Whanganui-a-Tara)
