= Royston Island =

Island in South Australia

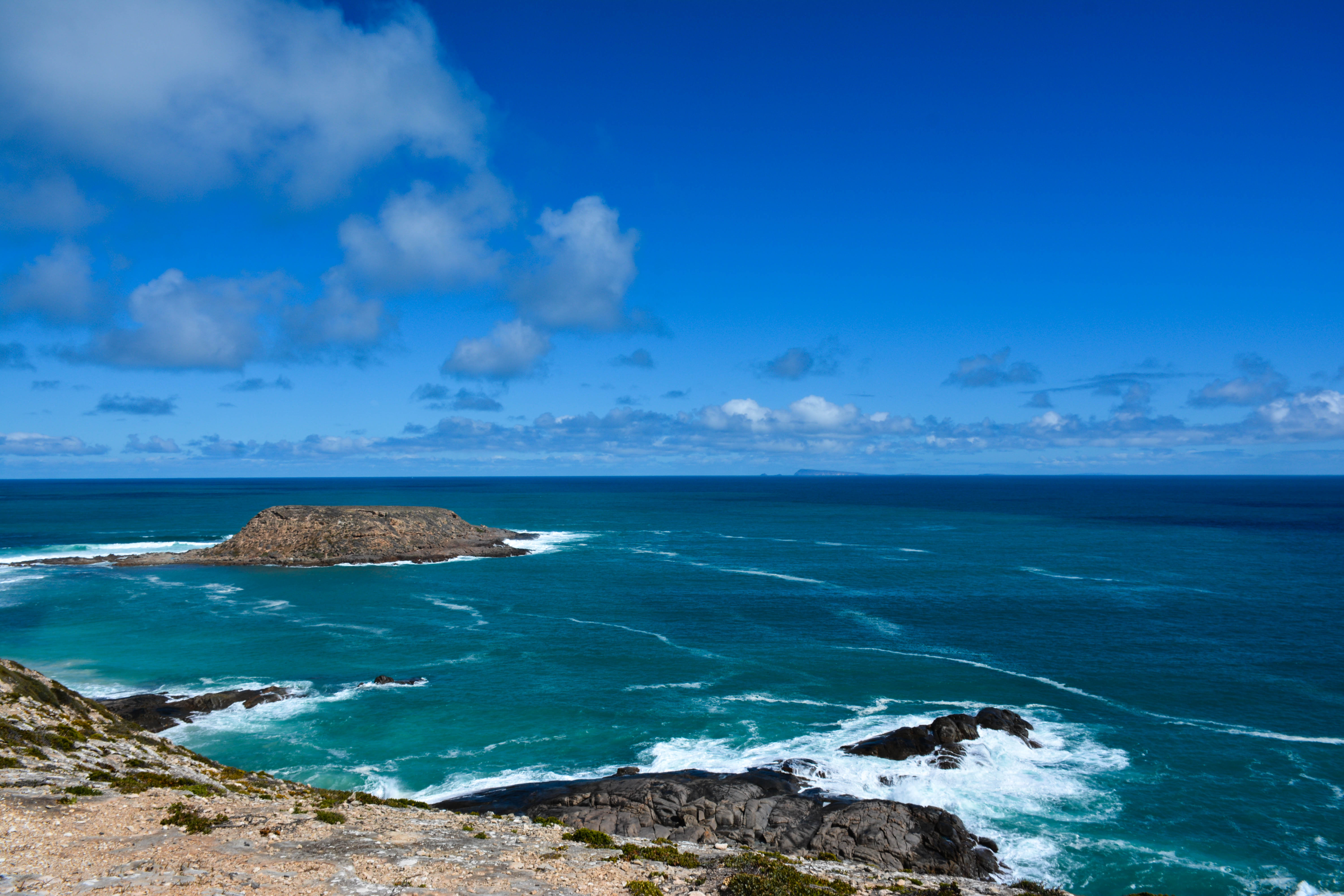
- View from the Royston Head to Royston Island, with Wedge Island visible on the horizon.

- Location within South Australia

Geography
- Location: Spencer Gulf
- Coordinates: 35°11′43″S 136°50′19″E
- Highest elevation: 38 m (125 ft)

Administration
- Australia

Royston Island (also known as North Island) is an island in the Australian state of South Australia at the northern end of Pondalowie Bay on the south-west extremity of Yorke Peninsula about 13 kilometres (8.1 miles) north-west of the town of Stenhouse Bay. The island has enjoyed protected area status since 1967 and since 1972, it has been part of the Innes National Park.

== Description ==
Royston Island is an island located on the Yorke Peninsula about 13 kilometres (8.1 miles) north-west of the town of Stenhouse Bay at the northern end of Pondalowie Bay within about 300 metres (980 feet) of Royston Head. The island is fringed with detritus consisting of eroded calcarenite and granite boulders which a talus slope rises to a “relatively flat, plateau-like summit” at a height of 38 metres (125 feet) above sea level. The island is connected to Royston Head by a “shallow, partially drying reef.” Access to the island is reported as being “probably most accessible by small boat via the north-eastern coast.”

== Formation, geology and oceanography ==
Royston Island was formed about 7000 years ago following the rise of sea levels at the start of the Holocene. Royston Island consists of a calcarenite upper layer over a “pronounced ridge of Lincoln Complex granite.” Royston Island is fringed partly on its north-west and south-east ends by fringing reefs while the waters surrounding its extent drop to a depth of 20 metres (66 feet) within a distance of 1 kilometre (0.62 miles) on its westside.

== Flora and fauna ==
=== Flora ===
A survey carried out during 1982 on Royston Island recorded a total of nineteen plant species. The island's summit is dominated by a “low, windswept shrubland” consisting of marsh saltbush and coast daisy-bush accompanied by less abundant species such as southern sea-heath, round-leaved pigface and pointed twinleaf. The talus slopes support shrubs of nitre-bush, native juniper, cockies tongue, African boxthorn, yellow-flowering sticky goodenia, Austral stork's bill, coastal lignum and ruby saltbush, while calcrete ledges associated with the island's upper levels are “festooned with climbing bower spinach.”

=== Fauna ===
Vertebrate animals are represented by birds and reptiles. As of 1982, little penguins were observed as being the common bird on the island followed by silver gulls. Both bird species used the island as a breeding colony. As of 2011, the status of the little penguin colony was not known. Also in 1982, the island is reported as supporting a “large population of marbled geckos.”

== History ==
=== European discovery and use ===
Royston Island is reported as being named after Lord Royston, eldest son of Lord Hardwicke by Matthew Flinders in 1802. The island is also known as “North Island”.

== Protected areas status ==
Royston Island first received protected area status along with Middle Island in Pondalowie Bay as a fauna conservation reserve declared under the Crown Lands Act 1929-1966 on 16 March 1967. Since 1972, it has been part of the Innes National Park. Since 2012, the waters adjoining the shoreline of Royston Island have been within a habitat protection zone in the South Spencer Gulf Marine Park. Since at least 2014, Royston Island and the other two islands in Pondalowie Bay (from north to south), Middle Island and South South Island, are closed to access by visitors to the national park. Penguin breeding sites were noted there in a 1996 survey of South Australia's offshore islands.

== See also ==
- List of islands of Australia
- List of little penguin colonies

== Citations and references ==
=== References ===
- South Australia. Department of Marine and Harbors (DMH) (1985), The Waters of South Australia a series of charts, sailing notes and coastal photographs, Department of Marine and Harbors, South Australia, ISBN 978-0-7243-7603-2
- "Innes National Park Management Plan" (PDF). Department for Environment and Heritage (DEH). June 2003.
- "MARINE PARK 12, Southern Spencer Gulf" (PDF). Department of Environment, Water and Natural Resources.
- "Innes National Park Map" (PDF). Department of Environment, Water and Natural Resources (DEWNR). 2014.
- A.C., Robinson; Canty, P.; Mooney, T.; Rudduck, P. (1996). South Australia's offshore islands (PDF). Canberra: Australian Heritage Commission. ISBN 0-644350-11-3.
- Wiebkin, Annelise (2011), Conservation management priorities for little penguin populations in Gulf St Vincent. Report to Adelaide and Mount Lofty Ranges Natural Resources Management Board SARDI Publication No. F2011/000188-1. SARDI Research Report Series No.588 (PDF), South Australian Research and Development Institute (Aquatic Sciences)
