= Pronunciation of English ⟨th⟩ =

Sounds spelled with the digraph ⟨th⟩

In English, the digraph ⟨th⟩ usually represents either the voiced dental fricative phoneme /ð/ (as in this) or the voiceless dental fricative phoneme /θ/ (as in think). Occasionally, it stands for /t/ (as in Thailand, or Thomas). In the word eighth, it is often pronounced /tθ/. In compound words, ⟨th⟩ may be a consonant sequence rather than a digraph (as in the /t.h/ of lighthouse).

== General description ==
In standard English, the phonetic realization of the two dental fricative phonemes shows less variation than many other English consonants. Both are pronounced either interdentally, with the blade of the tongue resting against the lower part of the back of the upper teeth and the tip protruding slightly, or with the tip of the tongue against the back of the upper teeth. For some speakers these two positions are in free variation, while for other speakers they are in complementary distribution, the position behind the teeth being used when the dental fricative stands in proximity to an alveolar fricative /s/ or /z/, as in myths (/θs/) or clothes (/ðz/). Lip configuration may vary depending on phonetic context. The vocal folds are abducted. The velopharyngeal port is closed. Air forced between tongue surface and cutting edge of the upper teeth (interdental) or inside surface of the teeth (dental) creates audible frictional turbulence.

The difference between /θ/ and /ð/ is normally described as a voiceless–voiced contrast, the distinction that native speakers are most aware of. They are also distinguished by other phonetic markers: the fortis /θ/ is pronounced with more muscular tension than the lenis /ð/; and /θ/ is more strongly aspirated than /ð/, as can be demonstrated by holding a hand or putting a piece of paper or tissue in front of the mouth as they are spoken.

== Phonology and distribution ==
In modern English, /θ/ and /ð/ are distinct phonemes, not merely allophones, as demonstrated by minimal pairs such as thigh:thy, ether:either, teeth:teethe. They are distinguished from the neighbouring labiodental fricatives, sibilants and alveolar stops by such minimal pairs as thought:fought/sought/taught and then:Venn/Zen/den.

The vast majority of words in English spelled with ⟨th⟩ have /θ/, and almost all newly created words do. However, the high frequency of the function words, particularly the, means that /ð/ is more frequent in actual use.

As a general rule, in initial position, /θ/ is used except in certain function words; in medial position, /ð/ is used except for certain foreign loan words; and in final position, /θ/ is used except in certain verbs. A more detailed explanation follows.

=== Initial position ===
- Almost all words beginning with a dental fricative have /θ/.
- A small number of common function words (the Middle English anomalies mentioned below) begin with /ð/. The words in this group are:
  - 1 definite article: the
  - 4 demonstratives: this, that, these, those
  - 2 personal pronouns each with multiple forms: thou, thee, thy, thine, thyself; they, them, their, theirs, themselves, themself
  - 7 adverbs and conjunctions: there, then, than, thus, though, thence, thither (though in the United States thence and thither may be pronounced with initial /θ/)
  - Various compound adverbs based on the above words: therefore, thereupon, thereby, thereafter, thenceforth, etc.
- A few words use an initial ⟨th⟩ for /t/ (e.g. Thomas): see below.

=== Medial position ===
- Most native words with a medial ⟨th⟩ have /ð/.
  - Between vowels (including r-colored vowels): heathen, farthing, fathom, Worthington; and the frequent combination -ther-: bother, brother, dither, either, farther, father, further, heather, lather, mother, northern, other, rather, smithereens, slither, southern, together, weather, whether, wither; Caruthers, Netherlands, Witherspoon.
  - Followed by /r/: brethren.
- A few native words have a medial /θ/:
  - The suffixes -y, -ly, -ing and -ed normally leave terminal /θ/ unchanged: earthy, healthy, pithy, stealthy, wealthy, bothy (from booth); fourthly, monthly; earthing; frothed; but worthy and swarthy have /ð/.
  - Some plurals have /θs/, as discussed in more detail below: cloths, baths etc.
  - Compound words in which the first element ends or the second element begins with ⟨th⟩ frequently have /θ/, as these elements would in isolation: bathroom, Southampton; anything, everything, nothing, something.
  - The only other native words with medial /θ/ would seem to be brothel (usually) and Ethel.
- Most loan words with a medial ⟨th⟩ have /θ/.
  - From Greek: Agatha, anthem, atheist, Athens, athlete, cathedral, Catherine, Cathy, enthusiasm, ether, ethics, ethnic, lethal, lithium, mathematics, method, methyl, mythical, panther, pathetic, sympathy
  - From Latin: author, authority (though in Latin these had /t/; see below). Also names borrowed from or via Latin: Bertha, Gothic, Hathaway, Othello, Parthian
  - From Celtic languages: Arthur (Welsh has /θ/ medially: /ærθɨr/); Abernathy, Abernethy, as an anglicization, though Gaelic has no /θ/.
  - From Hebrew: Ethan, Jonathan, Bethlehem, Bethany, Leviathan, Bethel
  - From German: Luther, as an anglicized spelling pronunciation (see below).
- Loanwords with medial /ð/:
  - Greek words with the combination -thm-: algorithm, logarithm, rhythm. Exception : arithmetic /əˈrɪθmətɪk/. The word asthma may be pronounced /ˈæzðmə/ or /ˈæsθmə/, though here the ⟨th⟩ is usually silent.
- A few words have a medial ⟨th⟩ for /t/ or /th/ (e.g. lighthouse): see below.

=== Final position ===
- Nouns and adjectives
  - Nouns and adjectives ending in a dental fricative usually have /θ/: bath, breath, cloth, froth, health, hearth, loath, mouth, sheath, sooth, tooth/teeth, width, wreath.
  - Exceptions are usually marked in the spelling with a silent ⟨e⟩: tithe, lathe, lithe with /ð/.
  - blithe can have either /ð/ or /θ/. booth has /ð/ in England but /θ/ in Scotland and America.
- Verbs
  - Verbs ending in a dental fricative usually have /ð/, and are frequently spelled with a silent ⟨e⟩: bathe, breathe, clothe, loathe, scathe, scythe, seethe, sheathe, soothe, teethe, tithe, wreathe, writhe. Spelled without ⟨e⟩: mouth (verb) nevertheless has /ð/.
  - froth has /θ/ whether as a noun or as a verb.
  - The verb endings -s, -ing, -ed do not change the pronunciation of a ⟨th⟩ in the final position in the stem: bathe has /ð/, therefore so do bathed, bathing, bathes; frothing has /θ/. Likewise clothing used as a noun, scathing as an adjective etc.
  - The archaic verb inflection "-eth" has /θ/.
- Others
  - with has either /θ/ or /ð/ (see below), as do its compounds: within, without, outwith, withdraw, withhold, withstand, wherewithal, etc.

=== Plurals ===
- Plural ⟨s⟩ after ⟨th⟩ may be realized as either /ðz/ or /θs/:
  - Some plural nouns ending in ⟨ths⟩, with a preceding vowel, have /ðz/, although the singulars always have /θ/; however, a variant in /θs/ will be found for many of these: baths, moths, mouths, oaths, paths, sheaths, truths, wreaths, youths exist in both varieties; clothes always has /ðz/ (if not pronounced /kloʊz/).
  - Others have only /θs/: azimuths, breaths, cloths, deaths, faiths, Goths, growths, mammoths, myths, smiths, sloths, zeniths, etc. This includes all words in 'th' preceded by a consonant (earths, hearths, lengths, months, widths, etc.) and all numeric words, whether preceded by vowel or consonant (fourths, fifths, sixths, sevenths, eighths /eɪtθs/, twelfths, fifteenths, twentieths, hundredths /hʌndrədθs/, thousandths).
  - Booth has /ð/ in the singular and hence /ðz/ in the plural for most speakers in England. In American English, it has /θ/ in the singular and /θs/ or /ðz/ in the plural. This pronunciation also prevails in Scotland.

=== Grammatical alternation ===
In pairs of related words, an alternation between /θ/ and /ð/ is possible, which may be thought of as a kind of consonant mutation. Typically /θ/ appears in the singular of a noun, /ð/ in the plural and in the related verb: cloth /θ/, clothes /ð/, to clothe /ð/. This is directly comparable to the /s/-/z/ or /f/-/v/ alternation in house, houses or wolf, wolves. It goes back to the allophonic variation in Old English (see below), where it was possible for ⟨þ⟩ to be in final position and thus voiceless in the basic form of a word, but in medial position and voiced in a related form. The loss of inflections then brought the voiced medial consonant to the end of the word. Often a remnant of the old inflection can be seen in the spelling in the form of a silent ⟨e⟩, which may be thought of synchronically as a marker of the voicing.

=== Regional differences in distribution ===
The above discussion follows Daniel Jones' English Pronouncing Dictionary, an authority on standard British English, and Webster's New World College Dictionary, an authority on American English. Usage appears much the same between the two. Regional variation within standard English includes the following:

- The final consonant in with is pronounced /θ/ (its original pronunciation) in northern Britain, but /ð/ in the south, though some speakers of Southern British English use /θ/ before a voiceless consonant and /ð/ before a voiced one. A 1993 postal poll of American English speakers showed that 84% use /θ/, while 16% have /ð/ (Shitara 1993). (The variant with /ð/ is presumably a sandhi development.)
- In Scottish English, /θ/ is found in many words which have /ð/ further south. The phenomenon of nouns terminating in /θ/ taking plurals in /ðz/ does not occur in the north. Thus the following have /θs/: baths, mouths (noun), truths. Scottish English does have the termination /ðz/ in verb forms, however, such as bathes, mouths (verb), loathes, and also in the noun clothes, which can be realized without /ð/. Scottish English also has /θ/ in with, booth, thence etc., and the Scottish pronunciation of thither, almost uniquely, has both /θ/ and /ð/ in the same word. Where there is an American-British difference, the North of Britain generally agrees with the United States on this phoneme pair.
- Some dialects of American English use /ð/ at the beginning of the word "thank".

== History of the English phonemes ==
=== Germanic origins ===
Proto-Indo-European (PIE) had no dental fricatives, but these evolved in the earliest stages of the Germanic languages. In Proto-Germanic, /ð/ and /θ/ were separate phonemes, usually represented in Germanic studies by the symbols *đ and *þ.

- *đ (/ð/) was derived by Grimm's law from PIE *dʰ or by Verner's law (i.e. when immediately following an unstressed syllable) from PIE *t.
- *þ (/θ/) was derived by Grimm's law from PIE *t.

In West Germanic, the Proto-Germanic *đ shifted further to *d, leaving only one dental fricative phoneme. However, a new [ð] appeared as an allophone of /θ/ in medial positions by assimilation of the voicing of the surrounding vowels. [θ] remained in initial and presumably in final positions (though later terminal devoicing would in any case have eliminated the evidence of final [ð]). This West Germanic phoneme, complete with its distribution of allophones, survived into Old English. In German and Dutch, it shifted to a /d/, the allophonic distinction simply being lost. In German, West Germanic *d shifted to /t/ in what may be thought of as a chain shift, but in Dutch, *þ, *đ and *d merged into a single /d/.

The whole complex of Germanic dentals, and the place of the fricatives within it, can be summed up in this table:

PIE	Proto-Germanic	West Germanic	Old English	German	Dutch	Notes
*t	*þ	*[þ]	[θ]	/d/	/d/	Original *t in initial position, or in final position after a stressed vowel
*t	*þ	*[đ]	[ð]	/d/	/d/	Original *t in medial position after a stressed vowel
*t	*đ	*d	/d/	/t/	/d/	Original *t after an unstressed vowel
*dʰ	*đ	*d	/d/	/t/	/d/	Original *dʰ in all positions
*d	*t	*t	/t/	/s/ or /ts/	/t/	Original *d in all positions

Note that this table shows only the basic rules. The actual developments in all of the mentioned languages are more complicated (due to dialectal variation, peculiar developments in consonant clusters, etc.). For more on these phonemes from a comparative perspective, see Grammatischer Wechsel. For the developments in German and Dutch see High German consonant shift.

=== Old English ===
Thus English inherited a phoneme /θ/ in positions where other West Germanic languages have /d/ and most other Indo-European languages have /t/: English three, German drei, Latin tres.

In Old English, the phoneme /θ/, like all fricative phonemes in the language, had two allophones, one voiced and one voiceless, which were distributed regularly according to phonetic environment.

- [ð] (like [v] and [z]) was used between two voiced sounds (either vowels or voiced consonants).
- [θ] (like [f] and [s]) was spoken in initial and final position, and also medially if adjacent to another unvoiced consonant.

Although Old English had two graphemes to represent these sounds, ⟨þ⟩ (thorn) and ⟨ð⟩ (eth), it used them interchangeably, unlike Old Icelandic, which used ⟨þ⟩ for /θ/ and ⟨ð⟩ for /ð/.

=== Development up to Modern English ===
The most important development on the way to modern English was the investing of the existing distinction between [ð] and [θ] with phonemic value. Minimal pairs, and hence the phonological independence of the two phones, developed as a result of three main processes.

1. In early Middle English times, a group of very common function words beginning with /θ/ (the, they, there, etc.) came to be pronounced with /ð/ instead of /θ/. Possibly this was a sandhi development; as these words are frequently found in unstressed positions, they can sometimes appear to run on from the preceding word, which may have resulted in the dental fricative being treated as though it were word-internal. This allowed a word-initial minimal pair like thigh:thy.
2. English has borrowed many words from Greek, including a vast number of scientific terms. Where the original Greek had the letter ⟨θ⟩ (theta), English usually retained the Late Greek pronunciation regardless of phonetic environment, resulting in the presence of /θ/ in medial position (anthem, methyl, etc.). This allowed a medial minimal pair like ether:either.
3. English has lost its original verb inflections. When the stem of a verb ends with a dental fricative, this was usually followed by a vowel in Old English, and was therefore voiced. It is still voiced in modern English, even though the verb inflection has disappeared leaving the /ð/ at the end of the word. Examples are to bathe, to mouth, to breathe. Sometimes a remnant of the original vowel remained in the spelling (see: Silent e), but this was inconsistent. This allowed a minimal pair in final position like loath:loathe.

Other changes that affected these phonemes included a shift /d/ → /ð/ when followed by unstressed suffix -er. Thus Old English fæder became modern English father; likewise mother, gather, hither, together, weather (from mōdor, gaderian, hider, tōgædere, weder). In a reverse process, Old English byrþen and morþor or myrþra become burden and murder (compare the obsolete variants burthen and murther).

Dialectally, the alternation between /d/ and /ð/ sometimes extends to other words, as bladder, ladder, solder with /ð/ (possibly being restricted elsewhere by the former two clashing with blather and lather). On the other hand, some dialects retain original d, and extend it to other words, as brother, further, rather. The Welsh name Llewelyn appears in older English texts as Thlewelyn (Rolls of Parliament (Rotuli parliamentorum) I. 463/1, King Edward I or II), and Fluellen (Shakespeare, Henry V). Th also occurs dialectally for wh, as in thirl, thortleberry, thorl, for whirl, whortleberry, whorl. Conversely, Scots has whaing, whang, white, whittle, for thwaing, thwang, thwite, thwittle.

The old verb inflection -eth (Old English -eþ) was replaced by -s (he singeth → he sings), not a sound shift but a completely new inflection.

== Dialectal realizations ==
In some dialects the "th"-sound phonemes /θ/ and /ð/ are pronounced differently from the dental fricatives [θ] and [ð]. Most common are: substitution with labiodental fricatives [f] and [v] (fronting), substitution with alveolar stops [t] and [d] (stopping), and substitution with alveolar fricatives [s] and [z] (alveolarization). Fronting and stopping are more common among speakers of English dialects, whereas alveolarization is more common among language learners whose first languages are French, German, or Mandarin. To speakers of varieties in which /θ/ and /ð/ are pronounced [θ] and [ð], fronting and stopping are generally considered to have less of a marked contrast with the standard pronunciation than alveolarization, which is often more stigmatized.

A fourth, less common substitution is [h] for /θ/ word-initially or intervocalically. This is called debuccalization, and somewhat prevalent in Scottish English.

=== th-fronting ===
In some areas, such as London, and certain dialects, including African American Vernacular English and less commonly New Zealand, many people realize the phonemes /θ/ and /ð/ as [f] and [v], respectively. Although traditionally stigmatized as typical of a Cockney accent, this pronunciation is fairly widespread, especially when immediately surrounded by other fricatives for ease of pronunciation, and has, in the early 20th century, become an increasingly noticeable feature of the Estuary English accent of South East England. It has in at least one case been transferred into standard English as a neologism: a bovver boy is a thug, a "boy" who likes "bother" (fights). Joe Brown and his Bruvvers was a Pop group of the 1960s. The song "Fings ain't wot they used t'be" was the title song of a 1959 Cockney comedy. Similarly, a New Zealander from the northernmost parts of the country might state that he or she is from "Norfland".

Note that, at least in Cockney, a word beginning with /ð/ (as opposed to its voiceless counterpart /θ/) can never be labiodental. Instead, it is realized as any of [ð, ð̞, d, l, ʔ], or is dropped altogether.

=== th-stopping ===
Many speakers of African American Vernacular English, Caribbean English, Liberian English, Nigerian English, Philadelphia English, and Philippine English (along with other Asian English varieties) pronounce the fricatives /θ, ð/ as alveolar stops [t, d]. Similarly, but still distinctly, many speakers of New York City English, Chicago English, Boston English, Indian English, Newfoundland English, and Hiberno-English use the dental stops [t̪, d̪] (typically distinct from alveolar [t, d]) instead of, or in free variation with, [θ, ð]. Native speakers of most Indo-Aryan languages often substitute the dental fricatives [θ, ð] with the voiceless aspirated and voiced dental stops [t̪ʰ, d̪], respectively.

In Cockney, the th-stopping may occur when a word begins with /ð/ (but not its voiceless counterpart /θ/). This is also associated with the accent of the English city of Sheffield (such as the nickname dee-dahs for residents) but such pronunciations are now confined to the very oldest residents of Sheffield.

=== th-alveolarization ===
Th-alveolarization is a process that occurs in some African varieties of English where the dental fricatives /θ, ð/ merge with the alveolar fricatives /s/ and /z/. It is an example of assibilation.

In rarer or older varieties of African American Vernacular English, /θ/ may be pronounced [s] after a vowel and before another consonant, as in bathroom [ˈbæsɹum].

Th-alveolarization is often parodied as typical of French-, Japanese-, and German-speaking learners of English, but it is widespread among many other foreign learners because the dental fricative "th" sounds are not very common among the world's languages.

Homophonous pairs
/s, z/	/θ, ð/	IPA	Notes
ace	eighth	ˈeɪs	eighth more often merges with eights (see below)
bass	bath	ˈbæs	bass, the fish; but distinct in dialects with broad A
Bess	Beth	ˈbɛs	
breeze	breathe	ˈbɹiːz	
close	clothe	ˈkloʊz	
close	clothes	ˈkloʊz	
eights	eighth	ˈeɪts	
Erse	earth	ˈɜː(r)s	
face	faith	ˈfeɪs	
force	forth	ˈfoə(r)s	
force	fourth	ˈfoə(r)s	
frost	frothed	ˈfrɒst, ˈfrɔːst	
gross	growth	ˈɡroʊs	
kiss	kith	ˈkɪs	
lays	lathe	ˈleɪz	
laze	lathe	ˈleɪz	
lies	lithe	ˈlaɪz	
louse	Louth	ˈlaʊs	
lyse	lithe	ˈlaɪz	
mass	math	ˈmæs	
mess	meth	ˈmɛs	
miss	myth	ˈmɪs	
months	month	ˈmʌns	
moss	moth	ˈmɒs, ˈmɔːs	
mouse	mouth	ˈmaʊs	
pass	path	ˈpæs, ˈpɑːs	
piss	pith	ˈpɪs	
purse	Perth	ˈpɜː(r)s	
race	wraith	ˈreɪs	
rise	writhe	ˈraɪz	
Ross	Roth	ˈrɒs, ˈrɔːs	
ryes	writhe	ˈraɪz	
sai	thigh	ˈsaɪ	
sane	thane	ˈseɪn	
sane	thegn	ˈseɪn	
sank	thank	ˈsæŋk	
saw	thaw	ˈsɔː	
saw	Thor	ˈsɔː	In most Non-rhotic accents; specifically those without the Cot-caught merger.
seam	theme	ˈsiːm	
seas	seethe	ˈsiːz	
seem	theme	ˈsiːm	
sees	seethe	ˈsiːz	
seize	seethe	ˈsiːz	
sick	thick	ˈsɪk	
sigh	thigh	ˈsaɪ	
sin	thin	ˈsɪn	
sing	thing	ˈsɪŋ	
sink	think	ˈsɪŋk	
six	sixth	ˈsɪks	
size	scythe	ˈsaɪz	
soar	thaw	ˈsɔː	Non-rhotic accents with horse-hoarse merger.
soar	Thor	ˈsɔː(r)	With horse-hoarse merger.
soared	thawed	ˈsɔːd	Non-rhotic accents with horse-hoarse merger.
some	thumb	ˈsʌm	
song	thong	ˈsɒŋ, ˈsɔːŋ	
sore	thaw	ˈsɔː	Non-rhotic accents with horse-hoarse merger.
sore	Thor	ˈsɔː(r)	With horse-hoarse merger.
sored	thawed	ˈsɔːd	Non-rhotic accents with horse-hoarse merger.
sort	thought	ˈsɔːt	Non-rhotic accents.
sought	thought	ˈsɔːt	
suds	thuds	ˈsʌdz	
sum	thumb	ˈsʌm	
sump	thump	ˈsʌmp	
sunder	thunder	ˈsʌndə(r)	
sunk	thunk	ˈsʌŋk	
swart	thwart	ˈswɔː(r)t	
sword	thawed	ˈsɔːd	Non-rhotic accents with horse-hoarse merger.
tense	tenth	ˈtɛns	
tents	tenth	ˈtɛn(t)s	
truce	truth	ˈtruːs	
use (n)	youth	ˈjuːs	
whiz	with	ˈwɪz	With wine-whine merger.
wizard	withered	ˈwɪzə(r)d	
worse	worth	ˈwə(r)s	
wrasse	wrath	ˈræs	
wreath	Reece	ˈriːs	
wreath	Rhys	ˈriːs	
Z; zee	the	ˈziː	The before vowels and silent H; but distinct in dialects where Z is [zɛd]
Z; zee	thee	ˈziː	but distinct in dialects where Z is [zɛd]
Zs; zees	these	ˈziːz	
zen	then	ˈzɛn	

=== th-debuccalization ===
In many varieties of Scottish English, /θ/ becomes [h] word initially and intervocalically.

Th-debuccalization occurs mainly in Glasgow and across the Central Belt. A common example is [hɪŋk] for think. This feature is becoming more common in these places over time, but is still variable. In word final position, [θ] is used, as in standard English.

The existence of local [h] for /θ/ in Glasgow complicates the process of th-fronting there, a process which gives [f] for historical /θ/. Unlike in the other dialects with th-fronting, where [f] solely varies with [θ], in Glasgow, the introduction of th-fronting there creates a three-way variant system of [h], [f] and [θ].

Use of [θ] marks the local educated norms (the regional standard), while use of [h] and [f] instead mark the local non-standard norms. [h] is well known in Glasgow as a vernacular variant of /θ/ when it occurs at the start of a word and intervocalically, while [f] has only recently risen above the level of social consciousness.

Given that th-fronting is a relatively recent innovation in Glasgow, it was expected that linguists might find evidence for lexical diffusion for [f] and the results found from Glaswegian speakers confirm this. The existing and particular lexical distribution of th-debuccalization imposes special constraints on the progress of th-fronting in Glasgow.

In accents with th-debuccalization, the cluster /θr/ becomes [hr], giving these dialects a consonant cluster that does not occur in other dialects. The replacement of /θr/ with [hr] leads to pronunciations like:

- three – [hri]
- throw – [hro]
- through, threw – [hrʉ]
- thrash – [hraʃ]
- thresh – [hrɛʃ]
- thrown, throne – [hron]
- thread – [hrɛd]
- threat – [hrɛt]

== Assimilation ==
As with many English consonants, a process of assimilation can result in the substitution of other speech sounds in certain phonetic environments. Native speakers do this subconsciously.

At word boundaries, alveolar stops next to dental fricatives assimilate very regularly, especially in rapid colloquial speech, involving both the place of articulation and the manner of articulation: the alveolar stops become dental, while the dental fricatives become stops. The resulting consonant is usually long (geminated) which may be the only audible cue for the speaker to distinguish particular words (for example, the definite and indefinite articles, compare "run the mile" [ˈɹʌn̪ n̪ə ˈmaɪl] and "run a mile" [ˈɹʌn ə ˈmaɪl]).

in the: /ɪn ðə/ → [ɪn̪ n̪ə]
join the army: /ˈdʒɔɪn ði ˈɑːmi/ → [ˈdʒɔɪn̪ n̪i ˈɑːmi]
read these: /riːd ðiːz/ → [ɹiːd̪ d̪iːz]
right there: /raɪt ˈðɛə/ → [ɹaɪt̪ ˈt̪ɛə] (more commonly: [ɹaɪʔ ˈðɛə], with a glottal stop)
fail the test: /ˈfeɪl ðə ˈtɛst/ → [ˈfeɪl̪ l̪ə ˈtɛst]

The alveolar fricatives may become dental as well:

this thing: /ðɪs θɪŋ/ → [ðɪs̪ θɪŋ] or [ðɪs̪ s̪ɪŋ]
takes them: /teɪks ðəm/ → [teɪks̪ ðm̩] or [teɪks̪ s̪m̩]
was this: /wɒz ðɪs/ → [wɒz̪ ðɪs] or [wɒz̪ z̪ɪs]

/θ/ and /ð/ can also be lost through elision: months [mʌns], clothes [kloʊz]. In rapid speech, sixth(s) may be pronounced like six.

Them may be contracted to 'em; 'em was already used as a contraction of Middle English hem before they and them were borrowed Old Norse, but today it is perceived as an informal contraction of them.

== Acquisition problems ==
Children generally learn the less marked phonemes of the language before the more marked ones. In the case of English-speaking children, /θ/ and /ð/ are often among the last phonemes to be learnt, frequently not being mastered before the age of five. Prior to this age, many children substitute the sounds [f] and [v] respectively. For small children, fought and thought are therefore homophones. As British and American children begin school at age four and five respectively, this means that many are learning to read and write before they have sorted out these sounds, and the infantile pronunciation is frequently reflected in their spelling errors: ve fing for the thing.

Children with a lisp, however, have trouble distinguishing /θ/ and /ð/ from /s/ and /z/ respectively in speech, using a single /θ/ or /ð/ pronunciation for both, and may never master the correct sounds without speech therapy. The lisp is a common speech impediment in English.

Foreign learners may have parallel problems. Learners from very many cultural backgrounds have difficulties with English dental fricatives, usually caused by interference with either sibilants or stops. Words with a dental fricative adjacent to an alveolar fricative, such as clothes (/kloʊðz/ or /kloʊz/), truths /tɹuθs/, fifths (/fɪfθs/ or /fɪθs/), sixths (/sɪksθs/), anesthetic (/ˌænəsˈθɛtɪk/), etc., are commonly very difficult for foreign learners to pronounce. Some of these words containing consonant clusters can also be difficult for native speakers, including those using the standard /θ/ and /ð/ pronunciations generally, allowing such accepted informal pronunciations of clothes as /kloʊz/ (a homophone of the verb close) and fifth(s) as /fɪθ(s)/.

== History of the digraph ==
=== ⟨th⟩ for /θ/ and /ð/ ===
Though English speakers take it for granted, the digraph ⟨th⟩ is in fact not an obvious combination for a dental fricative. The origins of this have to do with developments in Greek.

Proto-Indo-European had an aspirated /dʱ/ that came into Greek as /tʰ/, spelled with the letter theta, which was distinguished from the unaspirated /t/, spelled with tau. In the Greek of Homer and Plato, this was still pronounced /tʰ/, and therefore when Greek words were borrowed into Latin, theta was transcribed with ⟨th⟩. Since /tʰ/ sounds like /t/ with a following puff of air, ⟨th⟩ was the logical spelling in the Latin alphabet.

By the time of New Testament Greek (koiné), however, the aspirated stop had shifted to a fricative: /tʰ/→/θ/. Thus theta came to have the sound that it still has in Modern Greek, and which it represents in the IPA. From a Latin perspective, the established digraph ⟨th⟩ now represented the voiceless fricative /θ/, and was used thus for English by French-speaking scribes after the Norman Conquest, since they were unfamiliar with the Germanic graphemes ð (eth) and þ (thorn). Likewise, the spelling ⟨th⟩ was used for /θ/ in Old High German prior to the completion of the High German consonant shift, again by analogy with the way Latin represented the Greek sound. It also appeared in early modern Swedish before a final shift to /d/.

The history of the digraphs ⟨ph⟩ for /f/ and ⟨ch⟩ for Scots, Welsh or German /x/ is parallel.

=== ⟨th⟩ for /t/ ===
Since neither /tʰ/ nor /θ/ was a native sound in Latin, the tendency emerged at the latest in medieval Latin, to substitute /t/. Thus, in many modern languages, including French and German, the ⟨th⟩ digraph is used in Greek loan-words to represent an original /θ/, but is now pronounced /t/: examples are French théâtre, German Theater. In some cases, this etymological ⟨th⟩, which has no remaining significance for pronunciation, has been transferred to words in which there is no etymological justification for it. For example, German Tal ('valley', cognate with English dale) appears in many place-names with an archaic spelling Thal (contrast Neandertal and Neanderthal). The German spelling reform of 1901 largely reversed these, but they remain in some proper nouns. The name Rothschild is an example of this, being a compound of rot[h] ("red") and Schild ("shield").

Examples of this are also to be found in English, perhaps influenced immediately by French. In some Middle English manuscripts, ⟨th⟩ appears for ⟨t⟩ or ⟨d⟩: tho 'to' or 'do', thyll till, whythe white, thede deed. In Modern English it can be observed in Esther, Thomas, Thames, thyme and the old spelling of Satan as Sathan. More recently, the name of the capital of Nepal was often written Katmandu down to the late 20th century, but is now usually spelt Kathmandu.

In a small number of cases, this spelling later influenced the pronunciation: amaranth, amianthus and author have spelling pronunciations with /θ/, and some English speakers use /θ/ in Neanderthal.

=== ⟨th⟩ for /th/ ===
A few English compound words, such as lightheaded or hothouse, have the letter combination ⟨th⟩ split between the parts, though this is not a digraph. Here, the ⟨t⟩ and ⟨h⟩ are pronounced separately (light-headed) as a cluster of two consonants. Other examples are anthill, goatherd, hothead, lighthouse, outhouse, pothead; also in words formed with the suffix -hood: knighthood, and the similarly formed Afrikaans loanword apartheid. In a few place names ending in t+ham, the t-h boundary has been lost and become a spelling pronunciation, for example Grantham. However, Witham (the town in Essex, not the river in Lincolnshire which is pronounced with /ð/), retains the boundary.

== See also ==
- Pronunciation
- English pronunciation
- Received Pronunciation
- Spelling pronunciation
- Non-native pronunciations of English
- English orthography
- Thorn
- Eth
