= South Island (South Australia) =

Island in South Australia

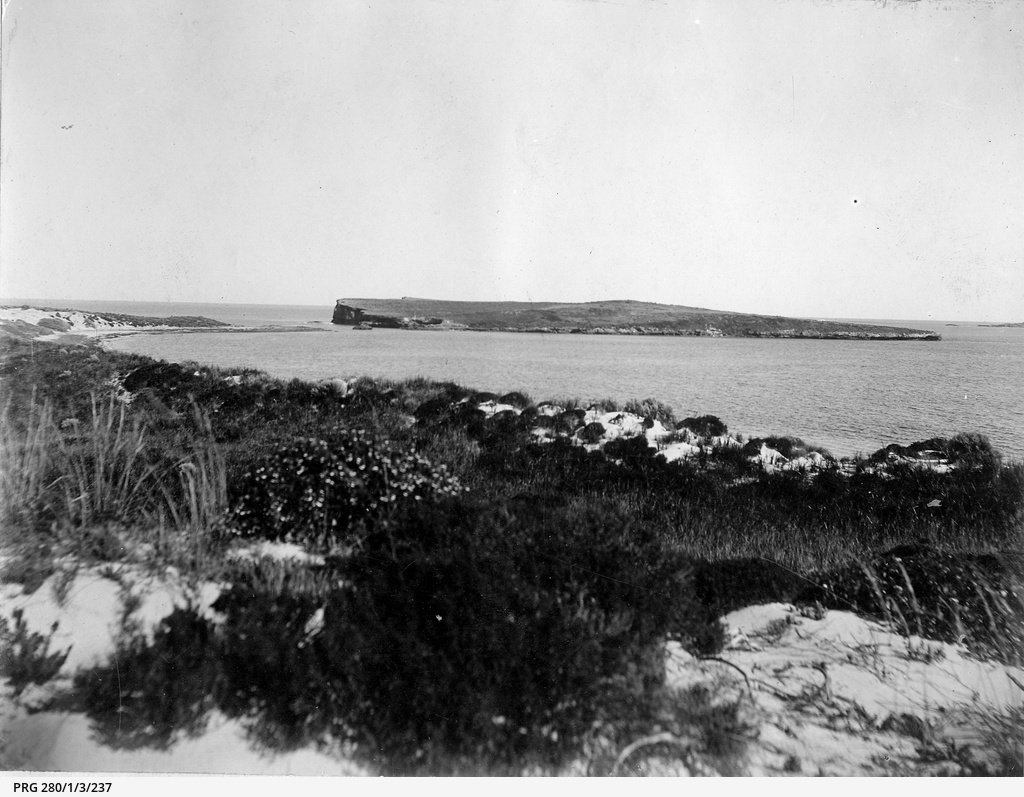
- South Island as viewed from the nearby coastline circa 1912 (State Library of South Australia PRG 280/1/3/237)

- Location within South Australia

Geography
- Location: Spencer Gulf
- Coordinates: 35°14′S 136°50′E
- Highest elevation: 18 m (59 ft)

Administration
- Australia

South Island (also called Peter Island, South Islet and West Bay Island) is an island located in the Australian state of South Australia at the south end of Pondalowie Bay on the south-west extremity of Yorke Peninsula about 11 kilometres (6.8 miles) north-west by west of the town of Stenhouse Bay. The island has enjoyed protected area status since 1970 and since 1977, it has been part of the Innes National Park.

== Description ==
South Island is an island located on the south-west extremity of the Yorke Peninsula in South Australia at the southern end of Pondalowie Bay about 11 kilometres (6.8 miles) north-west by west of the town of Stenhouse Bay. The island has “sheer cliffs” on its exposed north and west coasts where a maximum elevation of 18 metres (59 feet) exists while its relatively protected east and south coasts have “low cliffs and ledges” created by swells diffracted within the bay. The island is connected to the mainland by a “neck of drying rock and sand” which does allow access by fauna.

== Formation, geology and oceanography ==
South Island was formed about 6000 years ago following the rise of sea levels at the start of the Holocene. South Island consists of a calcarenite layer over a granite base. South Island is the permanently exposed part of a submerged reef system extending from the southern headland of Pondalowie Bay.

== Flora and fauna ==
=== Flora ===
A survey carried out during 1982 on South Island found that its vegetation consisted of two groups defined by exposure to the weather, sea spray and amount of available soil.

The western half of the island is occupied by a "low, open heath” that “clings to any soil-filled hollow and crack” and includes plant tolerant of a “saline rocky coastal or island environment” such as round-leaved pigface, creeping brookweed, marsh saltbush, southern sea heath and bassia.

The eastern half of the island which is more protected and has more soil than the western half is occupied by a heath supporting 40 species of plants. Species include bower spinach, coast beard-heath, coast daisy-bush, coast velvet-bush, cockies tongue, clustered swordsedge, common correa, dryland teatree, feather spear-grass, hills daisy, leafless cherry, native juniper, pleated podolepis, Port Lincoln wattle, cushion fanflower, thyme riceflower, slender dodder-laurel and variable groundsel.

=== Fauna ===
Vertebrate animals are represented by mammals and birds. A survey carried in 1982 noted evidence that kangaroos had accessed the island from the mainland at low tide. In 1982, the following bird species were observed - osprey, Pacific gull, silver gull and welcome swallow.

== History ==
=== Aboriginal use ===
As South Island has been historically accessible by foot at low water, it has been suggested in the literature that local Aboriginal people may have used the island to trap kangaroos to use as a source of food.

=== European use ===
The island is reported in various sources as being named as Peter Island, South Island, South Islet and West Bay Island. A navigation aid consisting of an automatic light which is operated by the Australian Maritime Safety Authority is located at the island’s north-west coast.

== Protected areas status ==
South Island was part of a parcel of land declared as a fauna reserve under the Fauna Conservation Act 1964 on 26 November 1970. It was subsequently declared as part of the Innes National Park as part of another parcel of land on 2 June 1977 while the waters adjoining its shoreline have been located within a habitat protection zone in the South Spencer Gulf Marine Park since 2012. Since at least 2014, South Island and the other two islands in Pondalowie Bay (from north to south), Royston Island and Middle Island, have been closed to access by visitors to the national park.

== See also ==
- List of islands of Australia

== Citations and references ==
=== References ===
- South Australia. Department of Marine and Harbors (DMH) (1985), The Waters of South Australia a series of charts, sailing notes and coastal photographs, Dept. of Marine and Harbors, South Australia, ISBN 978-0-7243-7603-2
- "Innes National Park Management Plan" (PDF). Department for Environment and Heritage (DEH). June 2003.
- "Innes National Park Map" (PDF). Department of Environment, Water and Natural Resources (DEWNR). 2014.
- "Southern Spencer Gulf Marine Park Management Plan 2012" (PDF). Department of Environment, Water and Natural Resources. 2012.
- A.C., Robinson; Canty, P.; Mooney, T.; Rudduck, P. (1996). South Australia's offshore islands (PDF). Canberra: Australian Heritage Commission. ISBN 0-644350-11-3.
