= Middle Island (South Australia) =

Island in the state of South Australia

- Location within South Australia

Geography
- Location: Spencer Gulf
- Coordinates: 35°12′52″S 136°49′53″E

Administration
- Australia

Middle Island is an island in the Australian state of South Australia located in Spencer Gulf within Pondalowie Bay on the south-western coast of Yorke Peninsula. It is the largest of three islands within the bay with an approximate area of 28 hectares (69 acres). It first obtained protected area status as a fauna conservation reserve declared under the Crown Lands Act 1929-1966 on 16 March 1967 and is currently located within the boundaries of the Innes National Park. It is also located within a habitat protection zone of the Southern Spencer Gulf Marine Park. DEWNR lists the islands as 'no access' areas for the general public.

== Fauna ==
A biodiversity survey was conducted on Middle Island in November 1982. Species recorded included (but are not limited to): black-faced cormorant, Caspian tern, sooty oystercatcher and the little penguin. Little penguin breeding sites were noted in a 1996 survey of South Australia's offshore islands.

== See also ==
- Royston Island
- South Island (South Australia)
