= Rabbit Island (South Australia) =

Island in South Australia

Rabbit
- Location within South Australia

Geography
- Location: Spencer Gulf
- Coordinates: 34°36′31″S 135°58′57″E
- Highest elevation: 10 m (30 ft)

Administration
- Australia

Rabbit Island is a rarely visited 32 hectares (79 acres) island located in Louth Bay, Spencer Gulf, South Australia. It also bears the historic French name of Ile Raynal. Unlike the larger, privately owned Louth Island which sits 3 kilometres (1.9 miles) to the north-west, Rabbit Island is public land and part of the Lincoln National Park. A diversity of native flora and fauna species have been recorded on the island.

== Flora and fauna ==
Little penguins have been observed nesting on Rabbit Island, but the size and status of the colony is unknown. Species of conservation concern listed under the National Parks and Wildlife Act 1972 which have been recorded on the island include the fairy tern (listed as endangered) and the bush stone-curlew, Cape Barren goose, sooty oystercatcher and rock parrot (listed as rare).

== See also ==
- List of little penguin colonies
