= Louth Island =

Island in South Australia

Louth Island (Jorunu)
- Location within South Australia

Geography
- Location: Spencer Gulf
- Coordinates: 34°34′40″S 135°57′15″E

Administration
- Australia

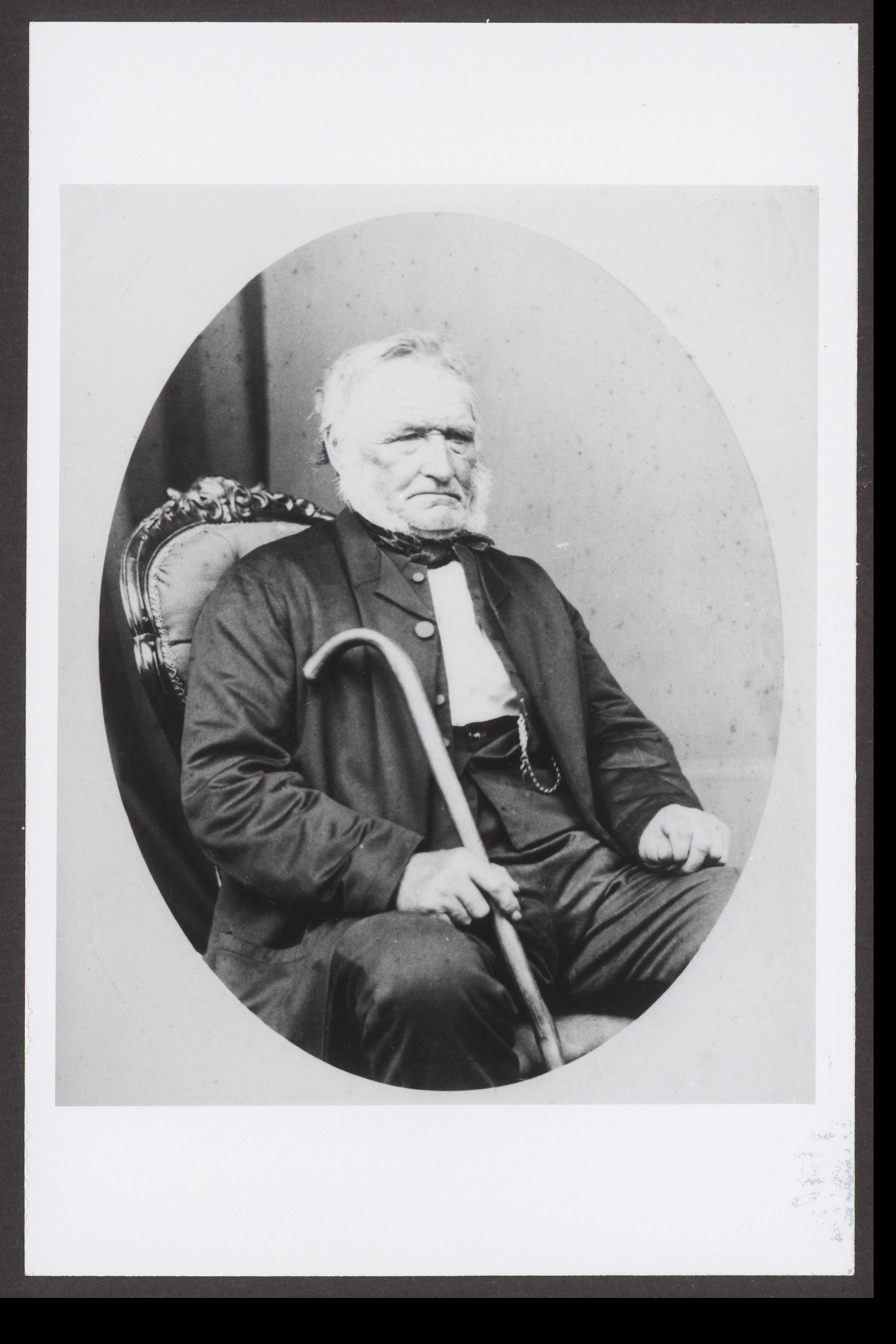
Alexander Watherston was a former lessee of Louth Island. (Image ca. 1870). State Library of South Australia B29346

Louth Island (Nauo: Jorunu or Yoruna) is a 135 ha island located in Louth Bay, Spencer Gulf, South Australia. The island is privately owned, and has previously been used for the grazing of sheep and mining of guano. The island has an old building with sleeping quarters, several beaches, inshore rocky reef and a boat anchorage. It is 17.5 km NNE of Port Lincoln and is easily accessible by boat. The indigenous name for the island is Yorunu.

== Ownership & development ==
In January 1861, a sheep which had been grazing on Louth Island for three years demonstrated remarkable growth of wool. One sample showed a staple twelve inches long, and its fleece was said to have weighed 24 lbs. At the time, the island and its stock were in the custody of Captain Bishop of Port Lincoln.

In the late 1800s, Louth Island was in the custody of Alexander Watherston.

In the early 1900s, waters around Louth Island were dredged for oysters.

On October 13, 1905, William Watherstone, lessee of the island, died in Port Lincoln. He was 49 years of age and suffered from Bright's disease and complications. He was one of the region's oldest residents, having arrived in 1859.

In 1910, it took three shearers on Louth Island a fortnight to shear 800 sheep due to bad weather.

In 1915, Louth Island was purchased at auction by W. B. White of Port Lincoln. The price paid was £4 8/6 per acre.

In 1917, a lease was offered at auction to permit the removal of guano from the coastal reserve surrounding Louth Island.

In 1938, a photograph of Louth Island was placed on display in the window of H. K. Williams' Snapshot Service in Port Lincoln as part of an exhibition of local 'Beauty Spots'.

In 1972, the island was purchased by Jack and Madeline Schoder. It remained in the Schoder family for 49 years. When they first placed it on the market in 2009, it was expected to sell for up to $3 million.

In 2021, Louth Island was purchased by Australian entrepreneur Che Metcalfe, the co-founder and former CEO of telecommunications infrastructure company Uniti Group.

The island is undergoing an estimated 60-million dollar development to become South Australia's first luxury off-grid private island accommodation, Rumi on Louth.

Rumi on Louth
- Interactive map of the Rumi on Louth area

General information
- Location: Louth Island, near Port Lincoln, South Australia
- Opening: 2023 (Stage One)
- Owner: Che Metcalfe

Other information
- Number of rooms: 20 (Stage One), expanding to ~60

Website
- rumionlouth.com.au

Rumi on Louth is a privately owned luxury 5-star eco-resort located on Louth Island, near Port Lincoln on South Australia's Eyre Peninsula. The development combines off-grid luxury accommodation with ecological restoration initiatives, positioning it as both a tourism destination and a regenerative environmental project.

== Overview and Facilities ==
The resort includes a collection of solar-powered villas and suites, a central restaurant, and a wellness spa currently under development. Guest experiences include catamaran cruises, guided tours, kayaking, and beach picnics. It operates entirely off-grid, powered by solar arrays with battery storage, and uses desalination, wastewater treatment, composting, and recycling systems to minimise its ecological footprint.

The restaurant has been recognised by the Australian Good Food Guide, receiving two "hats" for culinary excellence.

== Ecological Restoration ==
Rumi on Louth's founders have outlined a ten-year program to restore native ecosystems on Louth Island. The initiative includes removal of invasive boxthorn and re-establishment of endemic coastal vegetation. Architectural planning seeks to integrate structures with the island's natural topography, including the use of earth-sheltered villas designed to reduce visual and environmental impact.

== Development ==
Future stages of construction include an expansion from 20 to approximately 60 guest units, a Japanese-inspired day spa, tennis courts, and new ocean-view pavilions. The expansion is expected to increase the island's capacity to around 70 guests while maintaining the project's focus on self-sufficiency and low-impact design.

== Ownership ==
Louth Island was purchased in 2021 by Adelaide entrepreneur Che Metcalfe, co-founder of Uniti Group Limited. The resort's soft launch, branded “Rumi Reveal,” opened in late 2023 to showcase early accommodation, dining, and conservation work.

Metcalfe has stated that the project's growth will remain gradual, emphasising ecological care and integration with the island environment.

== Accidents & mysteries ==
On October 18, 1910 W. E. Goode of White's River and his two young sons were caught in a squall when returning home from a fishing excursion in Louth Bay. Their boat was driven out to sea. They were sighted on Louth Island by a search party and were recovered the following morning in an exhausted state.

In March 1921, Thomas Russell disappeared from Louth Island, where he had been the labourer in charge as employee of White. The island was searched for clues to his disappearance. The house was discovered in 'a desolate state' with 'poultry lying about dead' after a boat bringing provisions from the mainland discovered his absence.

In 1935, two farmers claimed to have seen what they believed to be the wreck of the ketch Vivid between Louth Island and the mainland. The vessel was lost with all hands aboard some years prior.

In 1947, Captain F. G. Sawford of the ketch Hawthorne lost his pet cocker-spaniel Queenie overboard some miles off Louth Island in rough seas after dark. The dog swam safely to land at the island, after which she was eventually returned to her owner.

== Little Penguin colony ==
Louth Island has supported a large colony of little penguins. An account from 1874 from a man named Masters, described them breeding there "in millions" and noted that by November the young had already hatched. Masters said that his party had to "entrench themselves at night to prevent the penguins tumbling everything over in the tent." A pair of white-bellied sea eagles had built a nest near the penguin colony and was preying upon the penguins. Penguin skins were observed piled around the eagles' nest. Earlier records of little penguin presence exist from November 1865.

In 2008, the presence of little penguins on Louth Island was inferred by the discovery of tracks. The same year, penguins were present and nesting on nearby Rabbit Island, to the south-east.

As of 2015 the status of the little penguin colony is unknown.

== See also ==
- List of little penguin colonies
