= Louth =

Louth may refer to:

== Australia ==
- Hundred of Louth, a cadastral unit in South Australia
- Louth, New South Wales, a town
- Louth Bay, a bay in South Australia
  - Louth Bay, South Australia, a town and locality

== Canada ==
- Louth, Ontario

== Ireland ==
- County Louth, Ireland
  - Louth GAA, a Gaelic games association
    - Louth county football team
  - Louth, County Louth, a village in the heart of the county Louth
  - County Louth Historic Names, Listing of historically documented names for Louth, village & county
  - County Louth (Parliament of Ireland constituency) (1692–1801)
  - County Louth (UK Parliament constituency) (1801–1885, 1918–1922), Ireland
  - North Louth (1885–1918)
  - South Louth (1885–1918)
  - Louth (Dáil constituency), Ireland (since 1923)

== United Kingdom ==
- Louth, Lincolnshire, England
  - Louth, Lincolnshire (UK Parliament constituency) (1885–1983), in England

== Other ==
- Louth (crater), a crater on Mars
