= Royston Head =

Royston Head South Australia
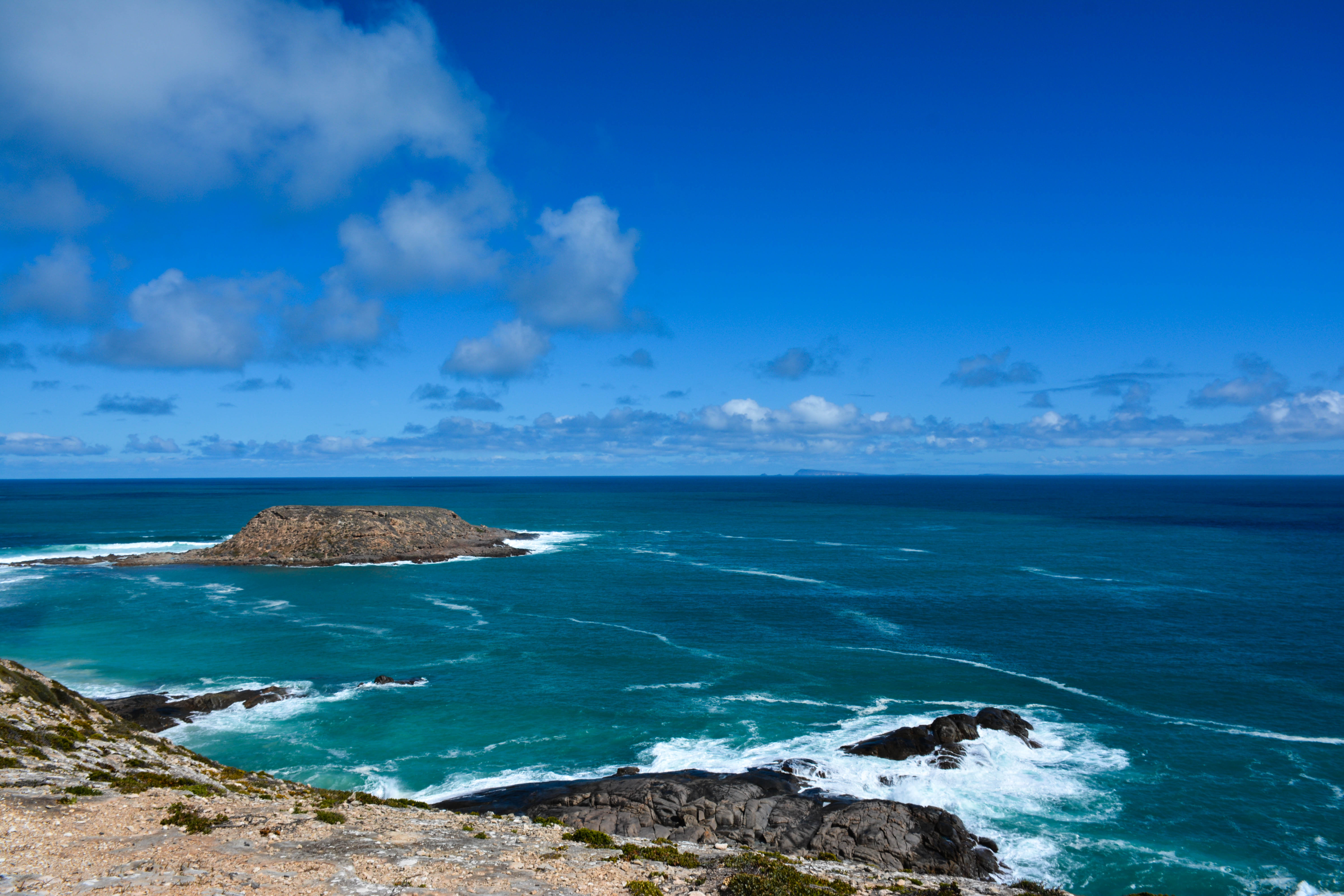
- View from the Royston Head to Royston Island, with Wedge Island visible on the horizon.

- Coordinates: 35°11′25″S 136°50′45″E
- Elevation: 59 m (194 ft)

Royston Head is a headland in the Australian state of South Australia located on the west coast of the south-west tip of Yorke Peninsula. It forms the northern extremity of Pondalowie Bay and is connected to an island of the same name by a drying reef. It was reported as being named after Lord Royston, eldest son of Lord Hardwicke by Matthew Flinders. The head is within the Innes National Park while the waters adjoining its shores are located within the boundaries of the Southern Spencer Gulf Marine Park.
