= Louth Bay, South Australia =

Louth Bay
- Town
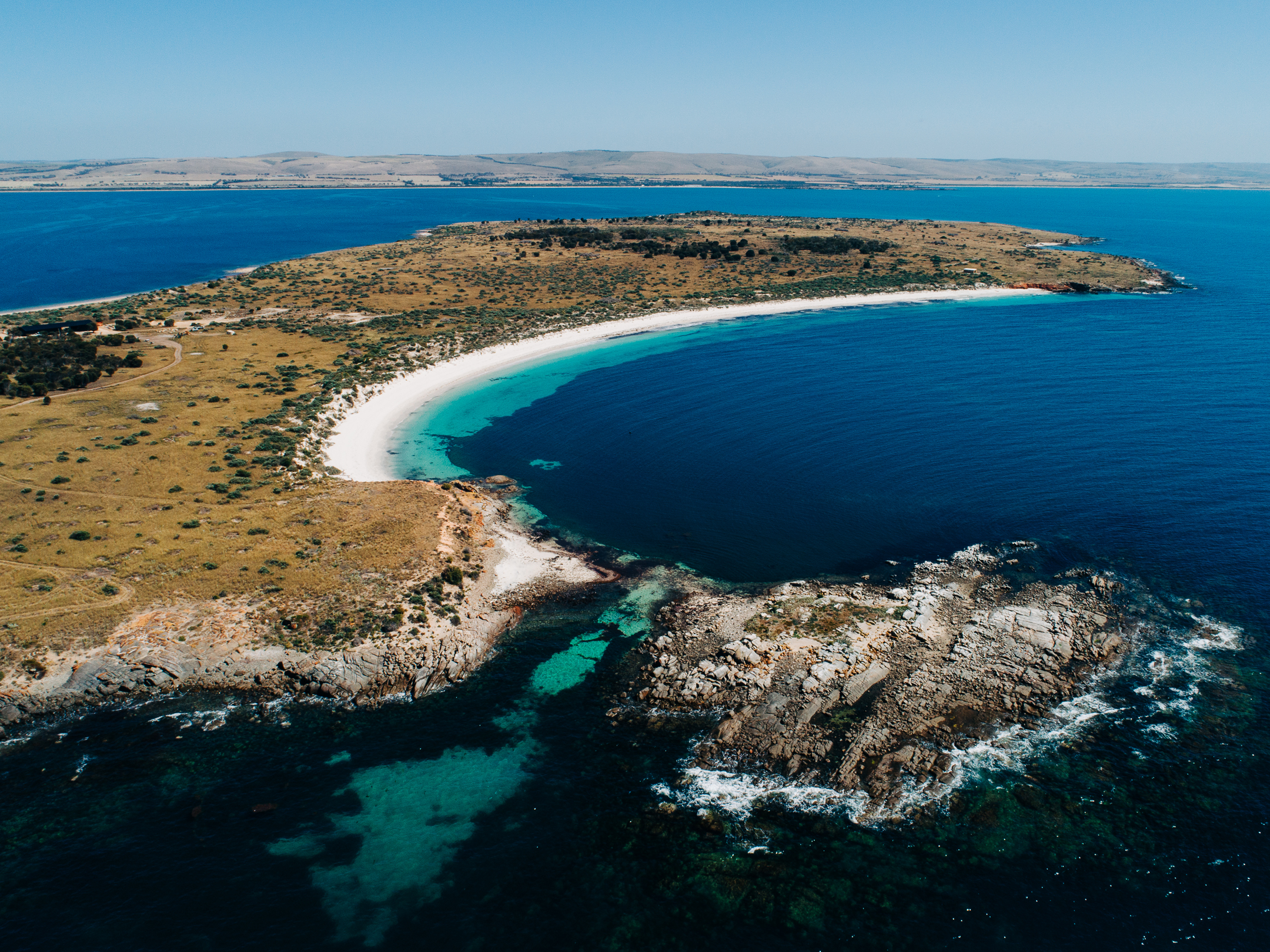

- Coordinates: 34°32′41″S 135°55′47″E
- Country: Australia
- State: South Australia
- Region: Eyre Western
- LGA: District Council of Lower Eyre Peninsula
- Location: 247 km (153 mi) W of Adelaide; 21 km (13 mi) N of Port Lincoln
- Established: 24 June 1909 (town); 16 October 2003 (locality)

Government
  - State electorate: Flinders
  - Federal division: Grey

Population
  - Total: 125 (SAL 2016)
- Time zone: UTC+9:30 (ACST)
  - Summer (DST): UTC+10:30 (ACST)
- Postcode: 5607
- County: Flinders
- Mean max temp: 21.2 °C (70.2 °F)
- Mean min temp: 11.3 °C (52.3 °F)
- Annual rainfall: 383.2 mm (15.09 in)
Localities around Louth Bay
| Whites Flat | Whites River | Whites River |
| Whites Flat | Louth Bay | Spencer Gulf |
| Poonindie | Poonindie | Spencer Gulf |
- Location; Adjoining localities

Louth Bay (formerly Laurence) is a town and locality in the Australian state of South Australia. It is named after the bay named by Matthew Flinders on 26 February 1802 which itself is derived from a place in Lincolnshire. At the 2006 census, Louth Bay had a population of 408.

A town was surveyed in March 1909 and proclaimed on 24 June 1909. It was named 'Laurence' after Laurence O'Loughlin, a South Australian politician. In November 1940, the District Council of Lincoln formally endorsed a recommendation to rename the town 'Louth Bay' in order to be in line with common use. The name change was gazetted on 20 February 1941. Boundaries were created in October 2003 for a locality with the name 'Louth Bay and which included the site of Government Town of Louth Bay.

Louth Island is a large privately owned island located within Louth Bay. 3 km to the south east of Louth Island lies the smaller Rabbit Island, which is part of the Lincoln National Park.

== History ==
The bay was a popular picnic destination in the early 20th century, but retained its serenity and wildness throughout.

In the early 20th century, the bay was dredged for oysters.

A jetty was proposed for Louth Bay in the 1878, and was constructed around that time. In 1908, the structure was damaged, allegedly by a ship. In 1949, the Government announced that it was seeking to demolish the Louth Bay jetty, and called for tenders. This was met by objections and a petition, leading to a delayed decision.

In the late 20th century, aquaculture became an important industry for Louth Bay, though fishermen and local residents have expressed concerned about stock escapees and pollution impacts from existing operations. Concerns included algal growth and seagrass degradation, plastic pollution and the loss of amenity.

== Incidents ==
On 12 February 2007 Phillip Kerkhof wrestled a 1.3 metre long Bronze whaler shark in Louth Bay, catching it and dragging it onto the jetty before cheering fishermen. He admitted to being drunk at the time and recommended that others not engage in such activities.

On 21 August 2014 the decapitated bodies of two New Zealand fur seals were found near Louth Bay. The circumstances surrounding their death were considered suspicious and an investigation was undertaken.

== See also ==
- Louth (disambiguation)
- Eyre Peninsula bushfire
