= Pondalowie Bay =

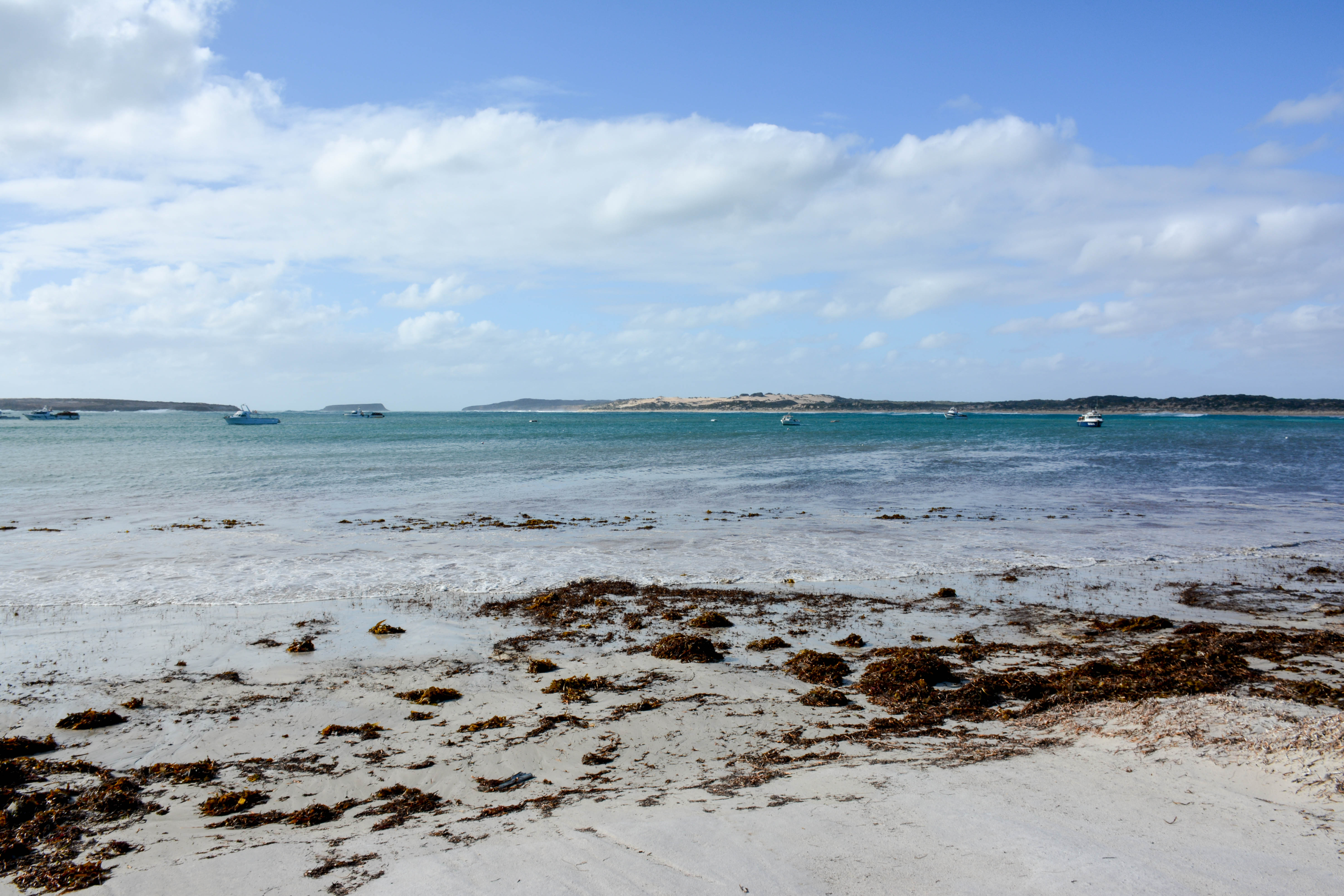
- Pondalowie Bay beach

- Location in South Australia
- Location: Spencer Gulf
- Coordinates: 35°14′10″S 136°50′13″E
- Type: Bay
- Basin countries: Australia
- Max. length: about 4.25 km (2.64 mi)
- Max. width: about 1.25 km (0.78 mi)
- Max. depth: 6.4 m (21 ft)
- Islands: Royston, Middle and South

Pondalowie Bay is a bay in the Australian state of South Australia located on the west coast of the south-west tip of Yorke Peninsula in Spencer Gulf about 12 kilometres (7.5 miles) west of Marion Bay. The coastline of Pondalowie Bay is both within the gazetted locality of Inneston and the Innes National Park.

== Extent & description ==
Pondalowie Bay is located on the west coast of the south-west tip of Yorke Peninsula within Spencer Gulf in South Australia about 12 kilometres (7.5 miles) west of Marion Bay. It lies between Royston Head at its northern extremity and an unnamed point at its southern extremity which is reported as being 0.75 nautical miles (1.39 km; 0.86 mi) north north-west of West Cape. The west side of the bay is guarded by three islands (from north to south) - Royston, Middle and South. The east side of the bay is formed by ‘a sandy beach backed by sand hills.’ The entry into and out of the bay by small vessels can be achieved by passing through the gap between Middle Island and South Islet as water depths approach 11 metres (36 feet) and as the width of the gap approaches 0.75 nautical miles (1.39 km; 0.86 mi). There is a navigation aid consisting of a light is located on the South Islet.

== Ports and other settlements ==
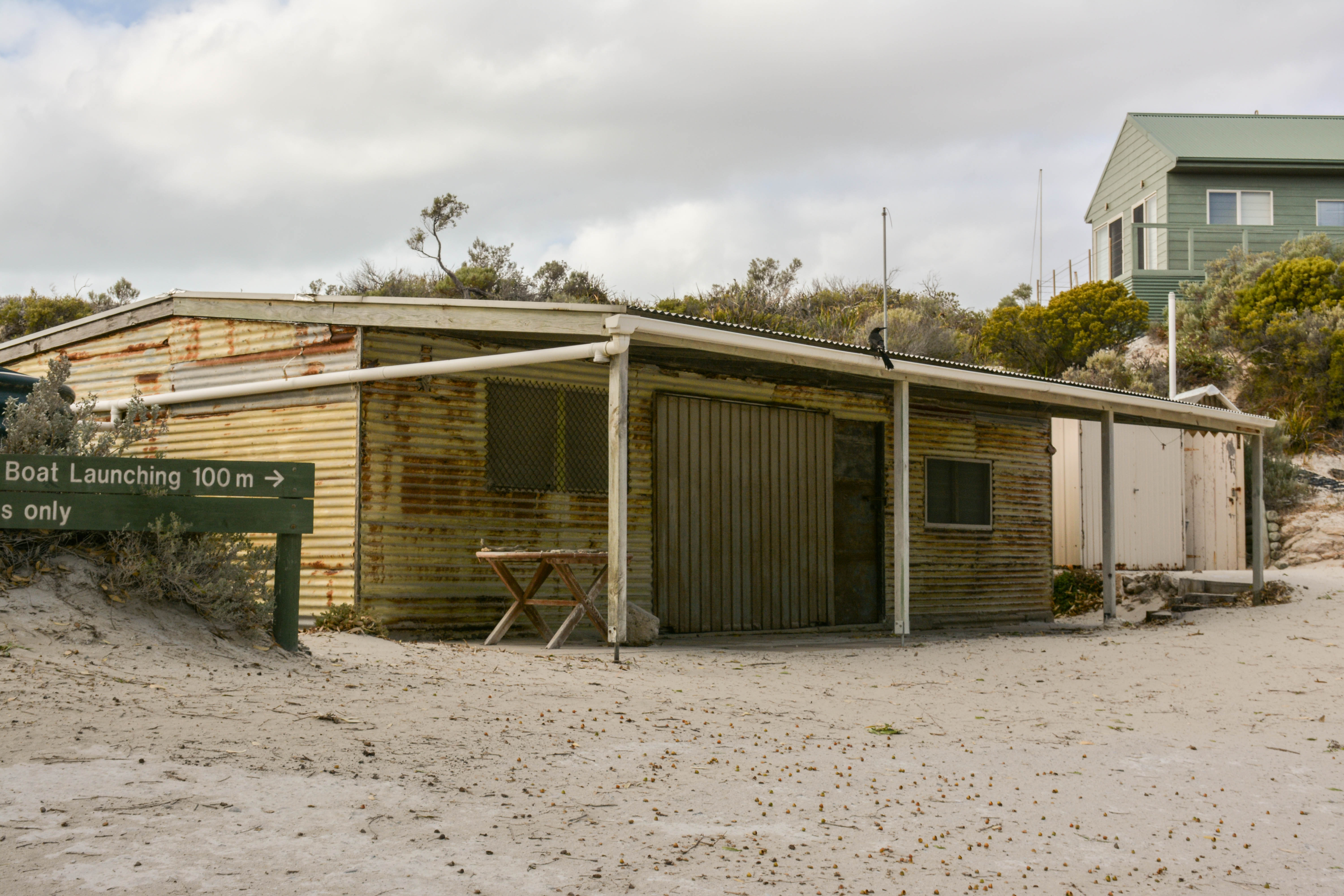
Pondalowie Bay fishermen's shacks

The south part of the bay is reported as providing anchorage, however the holding ground is considered to be poor due to the bottom consisting of ‘smooth limestone with a thin cover of sand.’ No infrastructure exists for maritime use apart from access to the beach from the national park’s road network which allows the launching and retrieval of small boats. The sole settlement in Pondalowie Bay is a group of dwellings described as a ‘Fishermans village’. Immediately beyond the shores of the bay is a camping ground provided as part of the national park’s infrastructure.

== Protected area status ==
The coastline of Pondalowie Bay and the land on the three islands have been part of Innes National Park since at least 1977 while the bay’s waters have been within the Southern Spencer Gulf Marine Park since 2012.

== Citations and references ==
=== References ===
- Boating Industry Association of South Australia (BIA); South Australia. Department for Environment and Heritage (2005), South Australia's waters an atlas & guide, Boating Industry Association of South Australia, ISBN 978-1-86254-680-6
- South Australia. Department of Marine and Harbors (DMH) (1985), The Waters of South Australia a series of charts, sailing notes and coastal photographs, Dept. of Marine and Harbors, South Australia, ISBN 978-0-7243-7603-2
- "Innes National Park Management Plan" (PDF). Department for Environment and Heritage (DEH). June 2003.
