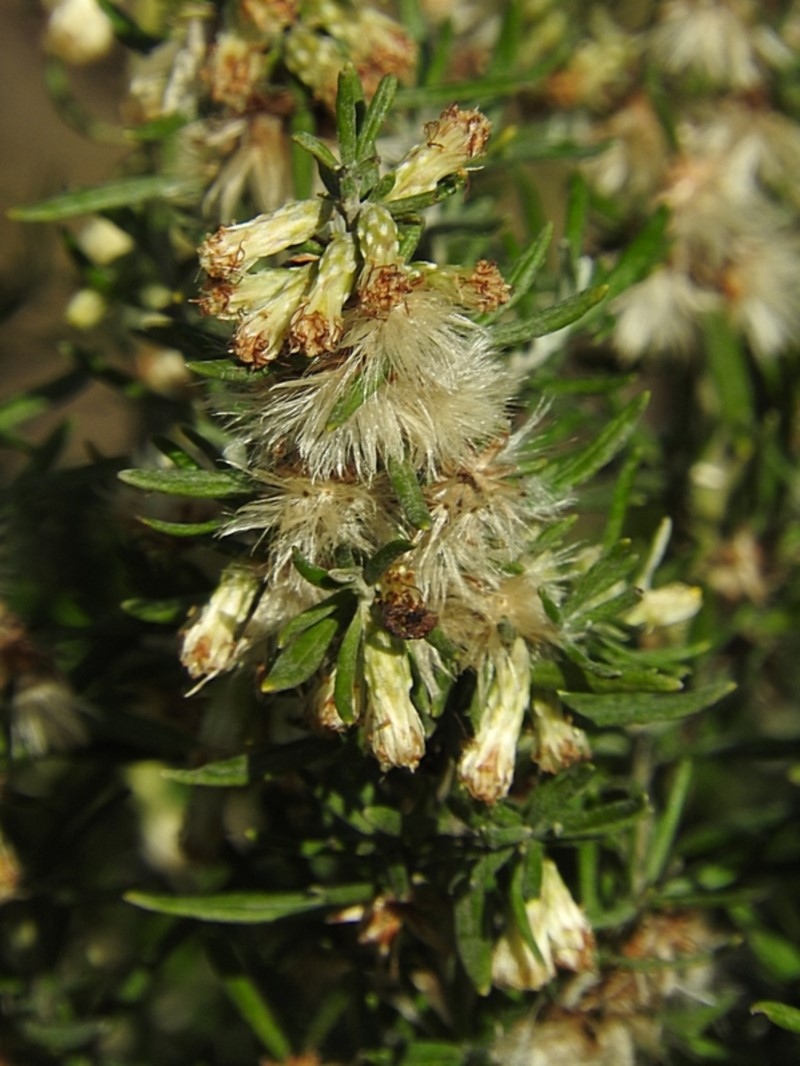
- Olearia axillaris flowers near Broulee

Scientific classification
- Kingdom: Plantae
- Clade: Tracheophytes
- Clade: Angiosperms
- Clade: Eudicots
- Clade: Asterids
- Order: Asterales
- Family: Asteraceae
- Genus: Olearia
- Species: O. axillaris

Binomial name
- Olearia axillaris (DC.) F.Muell. ex Benth.

Synonyms
- List: Aster axillaris (DC.) F.Muell.; Eurybia axillaris DC.; Eurybia axillaris DC. var. axillaris; Eurybia axillaris var. exaltata Steetz; Eurybia candidissima Steetz; Eurybia capitellata DC.; Eurybia linearifolia DC.; Eurybia oligantha DC.; Olearia axillaris F.Muell. nom. inval., pro syn.; Olearia axillaris (DC.) F.Muell. ex Benth. var. axillaris; Olearia axillaris var. linearis Benth.; Olearia axillaris var. normalis Benth. nom. inval.; Olearia axillaris var. obovata Benth.; Shawia axillaris (DC.) Sch.Bip.; Shawia axillaris (DC.) Sch.Bip. var. axillaris; Shawia axillaris var. exaltatum (Steetz) Sch.Bip.; Shawia candidissima (Steetz) Sch.Bip.; Shawia capitellata (DC.) Sch.Bip.; Shawia linearifolia (DC.) Sch.Bip.; Shawia oligantha (DC.) Sch.Bip.

= Olearia axillaris =

Coastal daisy-bush

Species of plant

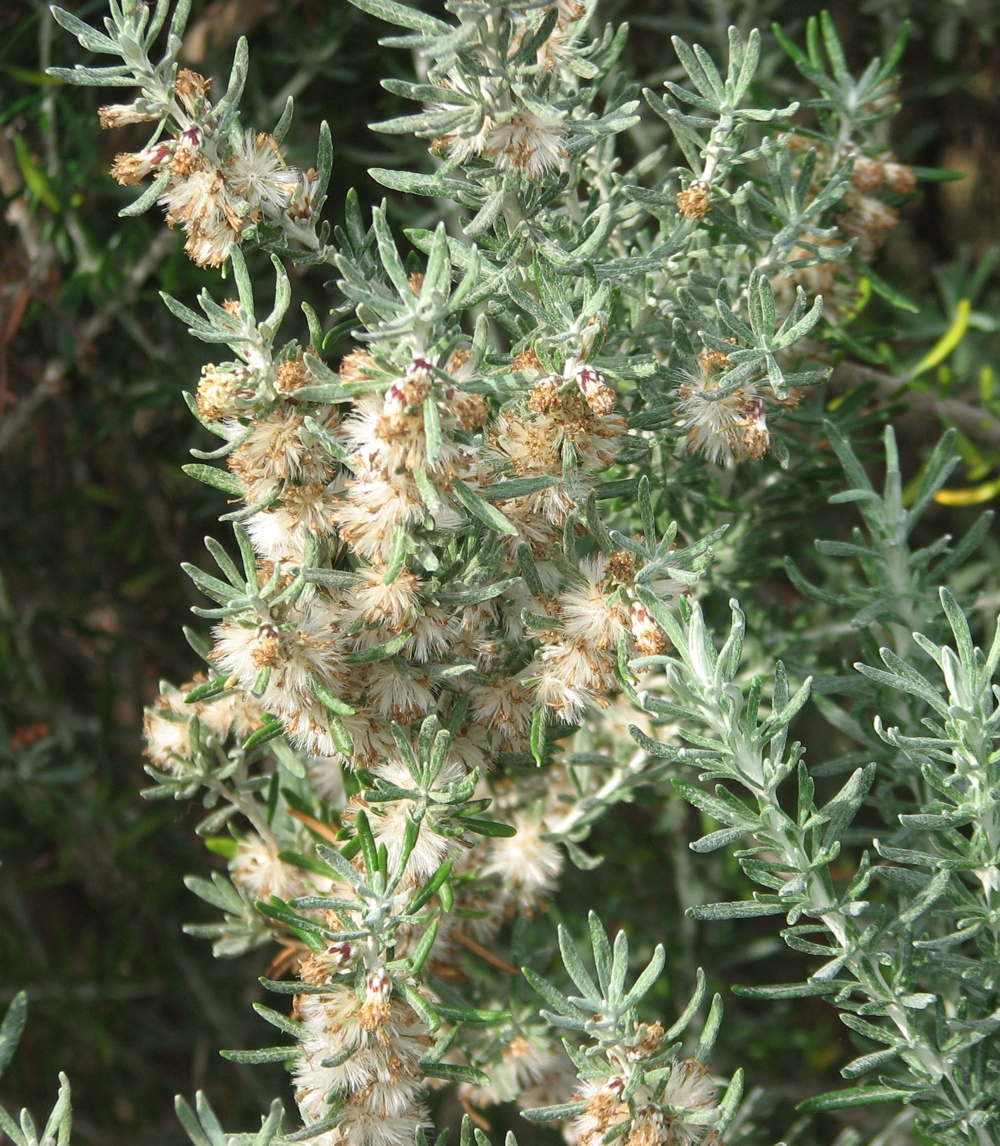
Developing seeds

Olearia axillaris, commonly known as coastal daisy-bush, coast daisy-bush or coastal daisybush is a species of flowering plant in the family Asteraceae and is endemic to coastal areas of Australia. It is an erect, bushy shrub with densely cottony-hairy branchlets, aromatic, linear to narrowly elliptic or narrowly lance-shaped to egg-shaped leaves with the narrower end towards the base and small white and yellow, daisy-like inflorescences.

== Description ==
Olearia axillaris is an erect, bushy shrub that typically grows to a height of 0.5–3 m (1 ft 8 in – 9 ft 10 in) and has many branchlets, densely covered with white, cottony hairs. The leaves are arranged alternately along the branchlets and are aromatic, linear to narrowly elliptic or narrowly lance-shaped to egg-shaped with the narrower end towards the base, 4–40 mm (0.16–1.57 in) long, 1–6 mm (0.039–0.236 in) wide and more or less sessile. The edges of the leaves are rolled under, the surfaces covered with woolly grey hairs, densely so on the lower surface. The heads or daisy-like "flowers" are arranged singly in leaf axils or on the ends of short side branchlets and are 5–10 mm (0.20–0.39 in) in diameter and more or less sessile, with five or six rows of bracts forming an involucre 3.5–5 mm (0.14–0.20 in) long at the base. Each head has three to six ray florets, the white petal-like ligules up to 4 mm (0.16 in) long, surrounding four to seven yellow disc florets. Flowering mostly occurs between December and May and the fruit is an achene 1.5–3 mm (0.059–0.118 in) long, the pappus bristles straw-coloured and about 5 mm (0.20 in) long.

== Taxonomy ==
Coastal daisy-bush was first formally described in 1836 by Augustin Pyramus de Candolle who gave it the name Eurybia axillaris in Prodromus Systematis Naturalis Regni Vegetabilis. In 1865, Ferdinand von Mueller changed the name to Aster axillaris in Fragmenta Phytographiae Australiae and in 1867 George Bentham changed that name to Olearia axillaris in Flora Australiensis. The specific epithet (axillaris) means "axillary", referring to the flowers.

== Distribution and habitat ==
Olearia axillaris grows in heath and scrub, mainly in near-coastal areas of New South Wales south from Sussex Inlet, the entire coast of Victoria and most of South Australia, south from Shark Bay in Western Australia and in north-eastern Tasmania.
