= Hundred of Dudley =

Dudley
- Cadastral division
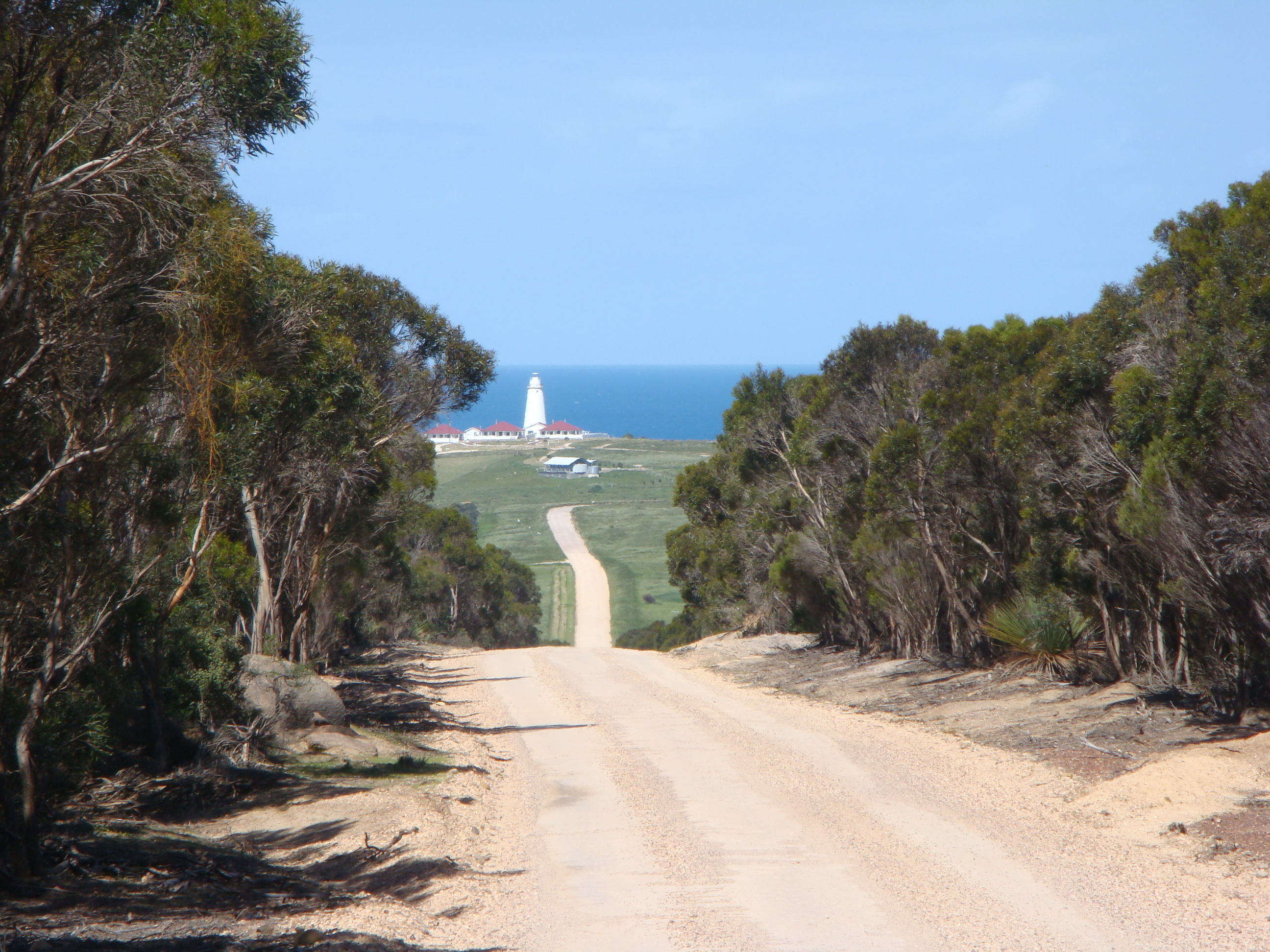
- Cape Willoughby Lightstation, Cape Willoughby, Kangaroo Island

- Coordinates: 35.80°S 137.97°E
- Country: Australia
- State: South Australia
- Region: Fleurieu and Kangaroo Island
- LGA(s): Kangaroo Island Council
- Established: 1874

Area
  - Total: 390 km^{2} (149 sq mi)
- County: Carnarvon
Lands administrative divisions around Dudley
Investigator Strait	Investigator Strait; Backstairs Passage	Waitpinga
Haines	Dudley	Ocean
Ocean	Ocean	Ocean
- Coordinates; Adjoining Hundreds

The Hundred of Dudley is a cadastral unit of hundred located in the Australian state of South Australia on Kangaroo Island and which covers an area of 300 square kilometres (117 sq mi) including the full extent of the Dudley Peninsula (known as the MacDonnell Peninsula from 1857 to 1986) and some land to the west of the peninsula.

The hundred was proclaimed by Governor Anthony Musgrave on 13 August 1874 along with its parent county, the County of Carnarvon.

The hundred is reported as being named by Governor Musgrave after his father-in-law, Dudley Field who was an American jurist.

As of 1905, the hundred was described as follows:

Both the soil and timber are good and, from Willson's orchard, apples were being picked and stored in cases betwixt layers of dry grass to preserve them from the constant attentions of the Rosella parrot... At a point between Cape Hart and False Cape the property of Mr. William Lyall is situated. Its owner may be justly termed one of the hardest workers on the Island. From here a glorious view of the Southern Ocean is obtainable, with Flour Cask and Pennington Bays in the distance. The country traversed to this point is inhabited by wild goats and wild sheep which run like wallaby through the dense thickets of scrub when disturbed. These, with iguanas lazing in the sun in the middle of our track, lent additional interest to the trip...

The Dudley School on Kangaroo Island opened as ‘Hill River’ in 1880; changed to ‘Hill River South’ in 1885 and then to ‘Dudley’ in 1905 but it closed in 1941.

As of 2016, the Hundred of Dudley is within the boundaries of the Kangaroo Island Council and includes the following localities: American Beach, Antechamber Bay, Baudin Beach, Brown Beach, Cuttlefish Bay, Dudley East, Dudley West, Ironstone, Island Beach, Kangaroo Head, Pelican Lagoon, Penneshaw, Porky Flat, Sapphiretown, Willoughby and Willson River.

== See also ==
- Lands administrative divisions of South Australia
- Dudley (disambiguation)
