= District Council of Dudley =

Coordinates: 35°43′09″S 137°56′24″E

Map of the District Council of Dudley

The District Council of Dudley was a local government area on Kangaroo Island in South Australia from 1888 to 1996. It was proclaimed on 7 June 1888 under the District Councils Act 1887 after being "severed" from the District Council of Kingscote.

The act of severance occurred after residents living both in the cadastral division of the Hundred of Dudley on the east end of Kangaroo Island and in other parts of the island expressed their dissatisfaction with the government decision to proclaim a single district council for the entire island rather than the preferred option of two district councils consisting one for the Hundreds of Dudley and Haines in the east and one for the Hundreds of Cassini and Menzies in the west.

The district council covered the full extent of the Dudley Peninsula along with a portion consisting of the eastern end of the Hundred of Haines on the remainder of the island. The district council's seat was located in the township of Penneshaw where at least two council chambers were constructed during its lifetime.

In 1936, the district council was reported as covering an area of 490 square kilometres (120,000 acres) with 80 kilometres (50 mi) of "main roads" and 103 kilometres (64 mi) of "district roads", and a population of 342 people including 110 living in Penneshaw all accommodated in 100 dwellings. The principal industries were the production of barley and wool, and the harvesting of gum from naturally-cultivated yacca plants known as "yacca-gumming."

In 1986, the district council was reported as having an area of 463.3 square kilometres (178.9 sq mi), a population of 700 (as of 1985) and with major towns being located at American River and at Penneshaw. The principal industries were agriculture, mining and tourism. Agriculture was focused on ‘mixed farming’ and the grazing of sheep for the production of boat wool and meat, mining consisting of a gypsum quarry and an associated port facility at Ballast Head while tourism was associated with accommodation infrastructure located mainly in American River. Industries involving "yacca-gumming, eucalyptus distilling and charcoal burning" were reported to be either in decline or to be extinct due to the declaration of legislation protecting native vegetation in 1983.

In 1996, it was amalgamated with the District Council of Kingscote to create the Kangaroo Island Council.

== Chairmen ==
The following persons were elected to serve as chairman of the district council for the following terms:

- Thomas Willson – the first chairman who served for "many years" between 1888 and his death in 1901.
- Charles Danford Willson – served four terms prior to his death in 1936.
- Edward Lawrence Bates (1934–36 and 1938–41)
- Ephraim Steen Bates (1936–38)
- Thomas Owen Willson (1942–43, 1947–48, 1949–50 and 1952–54)
- Danford Willson (1943–44)
- Frederick Wellington Neave (1944–45)
- Walter Reginald Willson M.M. (1945–46, 1951–52 and 1958–59)
- Leonard Paul Trethewey (1946–47, 1960–63 and 1971–77)
- Lester Dudley Buick (1950–51 and 1954–55)
- John Rowe Trethewey (1955–58 and 1963–67)
- Bruce Steen Bates (1959–60)
- Albert Victor Willson (1967–68)
- Hartley Glen Willson (1968–71)
- Harold George Bennett (1977–78)
- Andrew Ernest Howard (1978–81)
- Harold George Moffatt (1981–83)
- Thomas Douglas Maxwell Willson (1983–)
