= Dudley Peninsula =

Dudley Peninsula South Australia
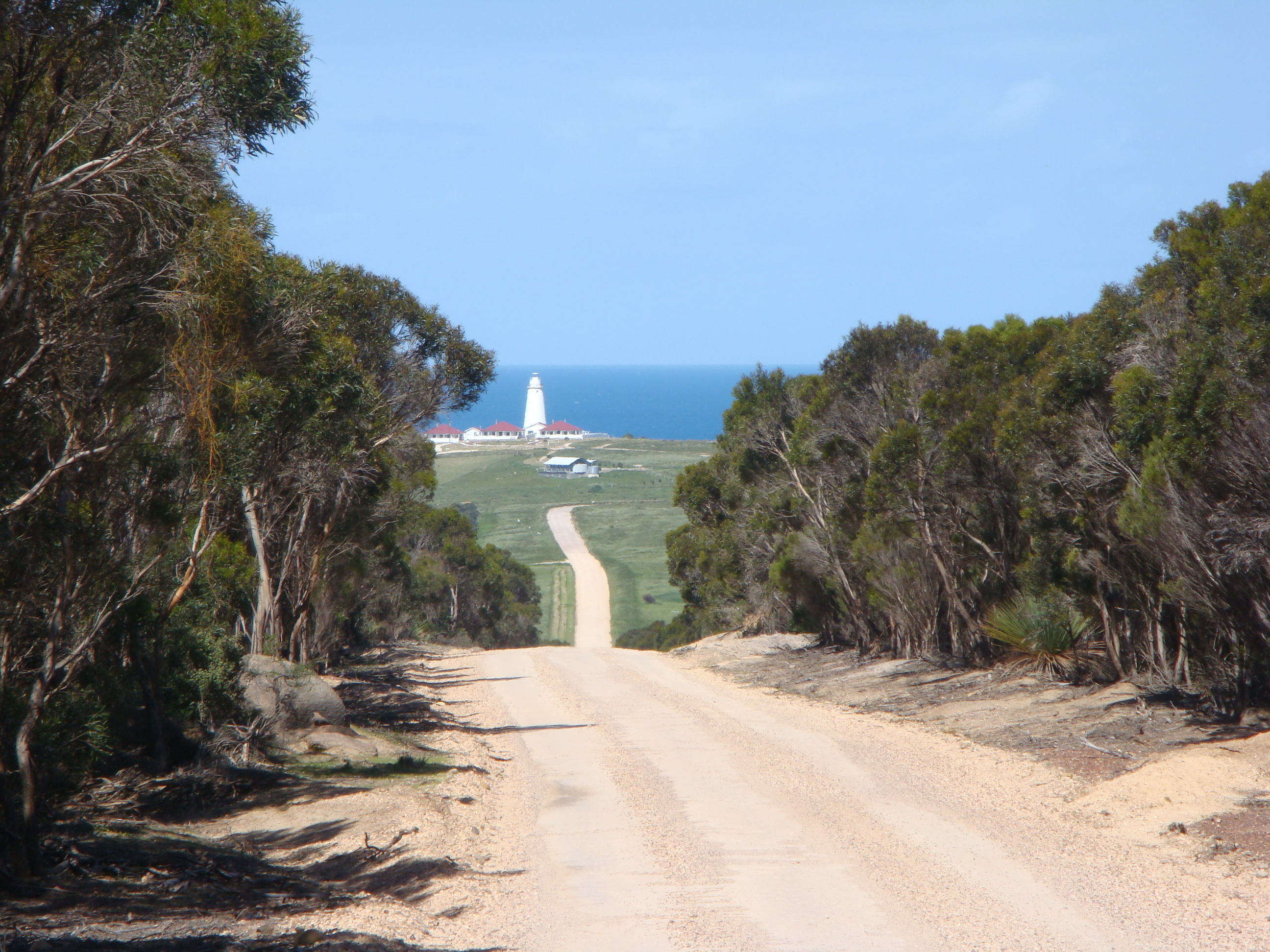
- Cape Willoughby Lightstation. Cape Willoughby, Kangaroo Island

- Coordinates: 35°47′50″S 137°55′21″E
- Population: 595 (2011 census)
Mean max temp	Mean min temp	Annual rainfall
18.1 °C; 65 °F	12.8 °C; 55 °F	537.3 mm 21.2 in
- Footnotes: Climate data

Dudley Peninsula (known as Presquila Gallissoniere and as the MacDonnell Peninsula from 1857 to 1986) is the peninsula forming the eastern end of Kangaroo Island in the Australian state of South Australia. It was inhabited by Aboriginal Australians as recently as 3,100 years BP but was found to be unoccupied by the first European explorers to visit it in the early 19th century. It was first settled by Europeans as early as the 1830s. As of 2011, it had a population of 595 people.

== Extent ==
Dudley Peninsula is the eastern end of Kangaroo Island. It is connected to the main body of the island via an isthmus which itself forms the southern side of Pelican Lagoon. The peninsula is bounded to the west by Pelican Lagoon, American River and Eastern Cove all within Nepean Bay, to the north-east by Backstairs Passage from Kangaroo Head in the west to Cape Willoughby in the east and to the south by the body of water known in Australia as the Southern Ocean and by international authorities as the Great Australian Bight.

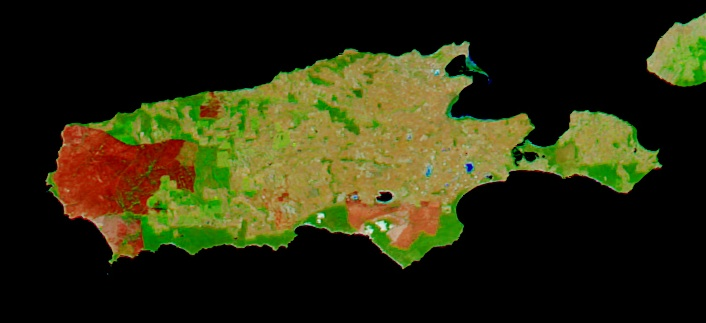
Dudley Peninsula is at the right hand side of the image

== Naming ==
The first reported European name for the Dudley Peninsula is "Presquila Gallissoniere" which was given by the Baudin Expedition. In 1857, it was named the "MacDonnell Peninsula" by William Bloomfield Douglas after Richard Graves MacDonnell, the sixth governor of South Australia. On 20 March 1986, it was renamed as the "Dudley Peninsula" to be "in keeping with local usage."

== History ==
=== Aboriginal use ===
The archaeological record indicates that Kangaroo Island was inhabited by Aboriginal Australians as early as 16,110 years BP. European explorers visiting in the early 19th century found no evidence of human occupation as evident by lack of smoke from fires which was common along the Australian coastline at the time, overgrown vegetation that had not been managed by "firestick farming" and animals such as seals and kangaroos "appeared unused to human presence". Aboriginal sites have been identified by the South Australian Museum and others on the Dudley Peninsula. As of 1999, radiocarbon dating of material recovered via archaeological excavation from a site called Pigs Waterhole on the peninsula suggest aboriginal presence in the eastern end of Kangaroo Island as recently as 3,100 years BP.

=== European discovery and settlement ===
Memorial rock marking the place where Baudin came ashore at Penneshaw on Kangaroo Island in 1803

Dudley Peninsula was first visited by European navigators in 1802 when the British navigator, Matthew Flinders, explored its north coast during March 1802. After meeting Flinders at Encounter Bay in April 1802, the Baudin expedition visited the peninsula's north coast later in April 1802 and explored its south coast during January 1803. Formal settlement commenced in 1836 with a fleet under the control of the South Australian Company arriving at what is now Kingscote further west on Kangaroo Island. Some of the people who had been living on that part of Kangaroo Island prior to 1836 moved to the peninsula to avoid being within the jurisdiction of the South Australian Company and thereby making it "most prosperous part of the island and the scene of its first significant agricultural and pastoral development." The full extent of Kangaroo Island was gazetted on 13 August 1874 as the cadastral division known as the County of Carnarvon simultaneously with the creation of another cadastral division, the Hundred of Dudley, which covers the full extent of what is now the Dudley Peninsula. In 1875, land in the Hundred of Dudley near the north coast of the peninsula was surveyed and given freehold title in response for the demand for agricultural land. The town of Penneshaw was proclaimed on 12 January 1882. On 7 June 1888, the local government area of the District Council of Dudley was established. This was subsequently merged in 1996 with the District Council of Kingscote to create the Kangaroo Island Council.

== Natural geography ==
=== Geomorphology and geology ===
The Dudley Peninsula came into existence about 9,500 years BP when Kangaroo Island became separate from what is now Fleurieu Peninsula due to the rise in sea level following the end of the last ice age. The peninsula has a plateau covering its northern half with a maximum height of about 150 metres (490 ft) while the southern half has a maximum height in the order of 100 metres (330 ft). Its coastline consists of a cliff-line in the order of 40 metres (130 ft) to 70 metres (230 ft) in height with the exception of sandy bays such as Nepean Bay in the north-west coast, Antechamber Bay in the north east coast and Pennington Bay on the south-west coast. The peninsula has a geological basement of Tapanappa Formation sandstones (from the Kanmantoo Group) which were laid during the early Cambrian period. The basement stratum has undergone extensive erosion to create laterite based soil which covers the northern half of the peninsula. The southern half of the peninsula has a Bridgewater Group limestone which was laid over the basement stratum during the Pleistocene and which has eroded to form a dune field.

=== Climate ===
The Dudley Peninsula has a mediterranean climate (Köppen climate classification Csb) As of 2002, Penneshaw received an annual rainfall of 509 millimetres (20.0 in) and this average is considered to increase to 600 millimetres (24 in) at the top of the peninsula's plateau.

== Human geography ==
=== Settlements ===
Settlements on the Dudley Peninsula consist of Penneshaw which overlooks Backstairs Passage on the north coast with the following being located on the north west coast overlooking Nepean Bay (from east to west) – Baudin Beach, Island Beach and Sapphiretown.

=== Demographics ===
At the 2011 census, the Dudley Peninsula had a population of 595 with 276 persons located in Penneshaw and the remaining 319 located on the remainder of the peninsula, being the localities of American Beach, Antechamber Bay, Baudin Beach, Brown Beach, Cuttlefish Bay, Dudley East, Dudley West, Ironstone, Island Beach, Kangaroo Head, Pelican Lagoon, Porky Flat, Sapphiretown, Willoughby and Willson River.

=== Land use ===
As of 1989, most of the northern side of the peninsula above a line from Cape Willoughby in the east to Strawbridge Point at the junction of American River and Eastern Cove in the west had been progressively cleared for agricultural purposes, while the southern side had retained most of its native vegetation. Subsequent clearing of native vegetation on a broadacre scale ceased in 1990 with the proclamation of the Native Vegetation Act 1990. As of 2014, majority of the land on the Dudley Peninsula has been zoned by law for agricultural use (i.e. "primary production") followed by conservation including most of the coastal perimeter with exception to some parts of the Nepean Bay coastline and by residential use.

=== Transport ===
==== Roads ====
The peninsula is served by a road network extending from both Penneshaw on its northern coast and from Hog Bay Road, a road maintained by the South Australian Government. Hog Bay Road which follows the peninsula's north-western coastline connects Penneshaw and the settlements overlooking Nepean Bay with the town of Kingscote and the rest of Kangaroo Island.

==== Sea ====
As of 2014, port infrastructure at Penneshaw was being used by Kangaroo Island SeaLink who operates the ferry service between Penneshaw and Cape Jervis on the South Australian mainland. Navigation aids located on the peninsula's coast include lighthouses at both Cape St Albans and Cape Willoughby.

==== Aviation ====
As of 2014, no public airfields were located within the extent of the Dudley Peninsula with the nearest and the only one available being the Kingscote Airport on the western part of the island in the locality of Cygnet River.

=== Governance ===
The Dudley Peninsula is located within the jurisdiction of the Kangaroo Island Council and within the following electorates – the state district of Finniss and the federal division of Mayo.

== Protected areas ==
As of 2015, the Dudley Peninsula contained the following conservation parks – Baudin, Cape Willoughby, Dudley, Lashmar, Lesueur, Pelican Lagoon and Simpson. Also, as of 2015, an area of privately owned land appropriately equivalent to that of the above conservation parks has protected status due to being subject to native vegetation heritage agreements.

== See also ==
- Dudley (disambiguation)

== Citations and references ==
=== References ===
- Boating Industry Association of South Australia (BIA); South Australia. Department for Environment and Heritage (2005), South Australia's waters an atlas & guide, Boating Industry Association of South Australia, ISBN 978-1-86254-680-6
- South Australia. Department of Marine and Harbors (DMH) (1985), The Waters of South Australia a series of charts, sailing notes and coastal photographs, Dept. of Marine and Harbors, South Australia, ISBN 978-0-7243-7603-2
- "Kangaroo Island Council development plan" (PDF). Department of Planning, Transport and Infrastructure (DPTI). 20 February 2014. Archived from the original (PDF) on 17 November 2015.
- Henschke, Chris; Billing, Bruce; Dooley, Trevor (December 2002), Dudley Peninsula Salinity Management Plan, Rural Solutions SA, archived from the original on 27 April 2013
- Kangaroo Island Council (May 2013). "A Business Case for the Upgrade of the Kangaroo Island Airport at Kingscote" (PDF). Archived from the original (PDF) on 28 March 2019.
- Marsden, Susan (1991). "A short history of Kangaroo Island". Professional Historians Association (South Australia). Archived from the original on 17 June 2022.
- Robinson, A. C.; Armstrong, D. M. (eds.). A Biological Survey of Kangaroo Island, South Australia, 1989 & 1990 (PDF). Adelaide, SA: Heritage and Biodiversity Section, Department for Environment, Heritage and Aboriginal Affairs, South Australia. ISBN 0 7308 5862 6.
- Conservation Parks of Kangaroo Island Management Plan (PDF). Adelaide: Department of Environment and Planning, South Australia (DEP). 1987. ISBN 0-7243-8983-0.
- A.C. Robinson; P. Canty; T. Mooney; P. Rudduck (1996). "South Australia's offshore islands" (PDF). Australian Heritage Commission. ISBN 978-0-644-35011-2.
