= Pelican Lagoon Conservation Park =

Protected area in South Australia

- IUCN category Ia (strict nature reserve)
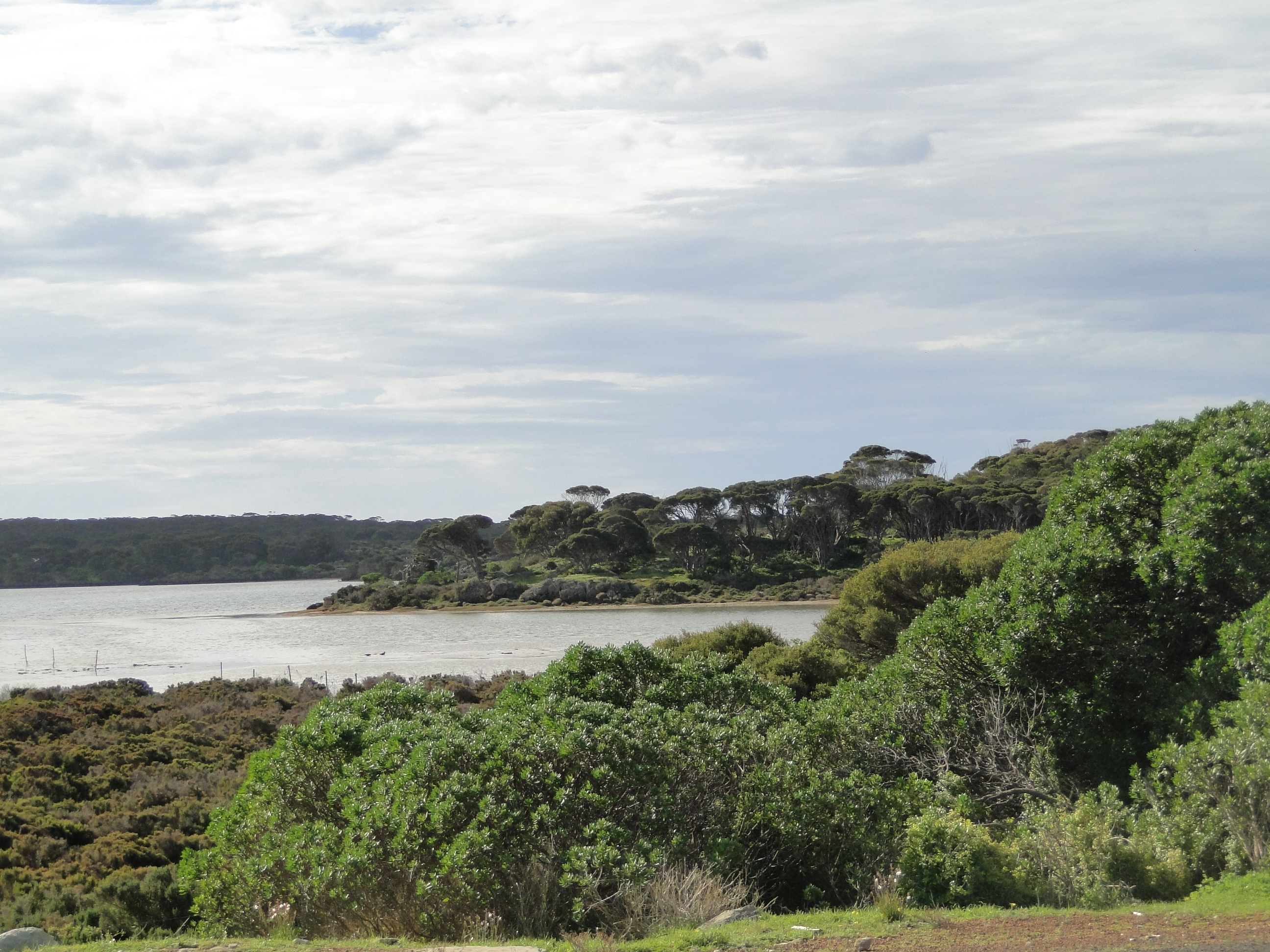
- Pelican Lagoon Conservation Park, Kangaroo Island, South Australia

- Location within South Australia
- Location: South Australia
- Nearest city: American River
- Coordinates: 35°48′15″S 137°46′30″E
- Area: 4.49 km^{2} (1.73 sq mi)
- Established: 16 March 1967
- Governing body: Department for Environment and Water

Pelican Lagoon Conservation Park is a protected area located in the Australian state of South Australia on the Dudley Peninsula on Kangaroo Island. It was dedicated in 1967 for the protection of wildlife habitat.

== Description ==
The conservation park has an area of 449 hectares (1,110 acres) and lies immediately to the south of the town of American River, about 25 kilometres (16 miles) southeast by south of Kingscote and 19 kilometres (12 miles) southwest by west of Penneshaw. It consists of land on the peninsula of the north side of the tidal inlet of Pelican Lagoon as well as several islands/islets within the inlet itself. It includes woodland, scrub and heath formations as well as wetland vegetation and adjoins samphire mudflats, providing habitat for several species of woodland and wetland birds and other animals. The conservation park is located within the boundaries of the gazetted locality of Pelican Lagoon with exception to the islets located within the lagoon. The conservation park is classified as an IUCN Category Ia protected area. It is complemented by the American River Aquatic Reserve.

=== Islets ===
Several of the islets present in Pelican Lagoon are within the conservation park. From east to west these are Rabbit Islet, Bird Islet, Goanna Islet, Pig Islet, Wallaby Islet and Shag Rock.

== History ==
Land within the conservation park first acquired protected area status as a fauna conservation reserve declared under the Crown Lands Act 1929-1966 on 16 March 1967 in respect to sections 475, 476, 477, 478 and 479 in the cadastral unit of the Hundred of Dudley. On 27 April 1972, the land was reconstituted as the Pelican Lagoon Conservation Park under the National Parks and Wildlife Act 1972. In 1980, it was listed on the now-defunct Register of the National Estate. As of 2018, it covered an area of 4.49 square kilometres (1.73 sq mi).
