= Kangaroo Head =

Kangaroo Head South Australia
- Coordinates: 35°43′6″S 137°54′13″E
- LGA(s): Kangaroo Island Council

Kangaroo Head is a headland in the Australian state of South Australia located at the north-west tip of Dudley Peninsula on Kangaroo Island. It was named by the British explorer, Matthew Flinders, on 23 March 1802.

== Description ==
Kangaroo Head is the north-west tip of Dudley Peninsula on Kangaroo Island and overlooks Nepean Bay to the west, Investigator Strait to the north and Backstairs Passage to the east. It is the termination for a pair of coastlines - one extending from Cape Willoughby in the east via Backstairs Passage and the other extending from Strawbridge Point in the south via Nepean Bay. It is described as ‘a bluff, rocky point marked by a conspicuous white cairn’ where the land behind ‘rises steeply to heights of 91 metres (299 feet) to 122 metres (400 feet)’. Since 2002, it has been located within the gazetted locality of Kangaroo Head.

== Formation, geology & oceanography ==
Kangaroo Head was formed when the sea reached its present level 7,500 years ago after sea levels started to rise at the start of the Holocene. The cliff line which includes Kangaroo Head consists of a grey metasandstone belonging to the Kanmantoo group bedrock known as the Tananappa Formation. The water adjoining Kangaroo Head drops to a depth of 13 metres (43 feet) at the base of its cliff face.

== History ==
=== Aboriginal use ===
As of 1999, the literature had not cited any archaeological discoveries specific to Aboriginal use of land in the immediate vicinity of Kangaroo Head.

=== European discovery ===
Kangaroo Head was discovered and named by Matthew Flinders on 23 March 1802. This place was where Flinders first sighted Mount Lofty, the tallest peak in the Mount Lofty Ranges.

== Economic activity ==
As of 2014, the land adjoining Kangaroo Head is used for farming. Farming activity at the locality had been underway prior to 1945 when most of the land had been reported as being cleared of native vegetation.

== See also ==
- Kangaroo (disambiguation)
