= District Council of Kingscote =

Coordinates: 35°39′22″S 137°38′19″E

Seat of the former District Council of Kingscote in South Australia

The District Council of Kingscote was a local government area located on the western part of Kangaroo Island in the Australian state of South Australia and which existed from 1888 to 1996.

== Origins ==
It was one of the local government areas that came into existence upon the proclamation of the District Councils Act 1887 on 5 January 1888, and initially comprised the entirety of Kangaroo Island.

The decision of the Government of South Australia to proclaim a single district council for the entire island, rather than the preferred option of two district councils, consisting of one for the cadastral units of the Hundreds of Dudley and Haines in the east and one for the Hundreds of Cassini and Menzies in the west, was unpopular, particularly with the residents of the Hundred of Dudley, who were concerned that they would be disfranchised due to the relatively long travel distance to the district’s likely seat in Kingscote.

A petition signed by 61 ratepayers in the Hundreds of Dudley and Haines requesting a separate district council in the east end of the island was presented to Thomas Playford, the Treasurer of South Australia, on 7 September 1887 who advised in reply:

the Hundred of Haines was in his opinion more identified with Kingscote than with Hog Bay, and that he could not recommend the request being granted. After the Bill became law if inconvenience resulted the ratepayers could petition him. The Government would give due consideration to any such request.

A subsequent petition signed by 51 ratepayers from the Hundred of Dudley which requested the severing of the Hundred of Dudley and the eastern part of the Hundred of Haines from the district council was received by the Government and was published in its gazette on 29 March 1888. On 7 June 1888, the petitioners’ request was granted by a proclamation under the District Councils Act 1887 with the creation of a new local government area, the District Council of Dudley.

== History ==
The District Council of Kingscote’s seat was located in the town of Kingscote where two council chambers were constructed during its lifetime with the first in 1910 and the second in 1955.

In 1936, the district council was reported as covering an area of 3,017 square kilometres (745,600 acres) with 137 kilometres (85 mi) of “main roads” and 9,900 kilometres (6,150 mi) of “district roads”, and a population of 851 people all accommodated in 1083 dwellings. The industries included the production of eucalyptus oil from the leaves of the Kangaroo Island narrow-leaf mallee and the harvesting of gum from naturally-cultivated yacca plants known as “yacca-gumming.”

In 1986, the district council was reported as having an area of 3,935 square kilometres (1,519 sq mi) and a population of about 3450 (as of 1984-85) with about 1500 people living in Kingscote and about 100 living in the smaller centre of Parndana located about 40 kilometres (25 mi) to the west of Kingscote. The principal industries were agriculture and tourism. Agriculture was concerned with the production of wool and meat, while tourism was changing from a traditional focus on recreational fishing to one where people visited the island to see its landscape, flora and fauna.

In 1996, it was amalgamated with the District Council of Dudley to create the Kangaroo Island Council.

== Chairmen and mayors ==
The following persons were elected as chairman of the district council up until 1974 when the title was changed to mayor for the following terms:

- William Jones (1888-1890)
- A. Reeves (1890-)
- Vincent Herbert Fuller Cook served 11 years as chairman and 25 years as councillor.
- Mervyn Smith (1934–36, 1937–39 and 1941–46)
- Frank Kasehagen MM (1936–37)
- Robert Wheaton OBE (1921–23, 1926–34, 1939–41 and 1946–47)
- Dudley Herbert Shepherd (1947–48)
- Edward Claredon Seager DCM (1948–49)
- Stanley Horace Sheridan (1949–50)
- Henry Driffield Suter (1950–52)
- Arthur Stanley Glen Barrett (1952–60 and 1961–64)
- John Elsegood (1960–61)
- Donald Fred Pillar (1965–67)
- Eric Lancelot Wheaton (1967–69)
- Dudley Gould Kelly (1969-1974)
- Eric John Beinke, the first mayor (1974-1981)
- Judith Maureen Morris (1981-1983)
- Neville Allan Macklin-Cordes (1983-)

== See also ==
- Kingscote (disambiguation)
