= John Fullerton (Royal Navy officer) =

Royal Navy Admiral (1840–1918)

Admiral Sir John Fullerton GCVO CB
- Born: 10 August 1840; Thrybergh, Yorkshire
- Died: 29 June 1918 (aged 77)
- Military career
- Allegiance: United Kingdom
- Branch: Royal Navy
- Service years: 1853–1904
- Rank: Admiral
- Commands: HMS Sapphire (China Squadron); HMY Victoria and Albert
- Awards: Knight Grand Cross of the Royal Victorian Order; Companion of the Order of the Bath

Admiral Sir John Reginald Thomas Fullerton, GCVO, CB (10 August 1840 – 29 June 1918) was a Royal Navy officer and courtier.

== Early life ==
Fullerton was born at Thrybergh in Yorkshire, the only son of the Rev. Weston Fullerton, Rector of Thrybergh, a scion of the landed gentry. His father died in 1843, and in 1853 Fullerton joined the Royal Navy as a midshipman.

== Naval career ==
In 1861 Fullerton was promoted lieutenant, and in 1862 he joined the almost new armoured frigate HMS Defence, a ship of the Channel Squadron. From 18 August to 14 December 1864 he was an Additional Lieutenant in HMS Bombay, an elderly 84-gun second rate ship of the line, cruising the coast of South America. The ship was destroyed in an accidental fire during target practice near Flores Island in the River Plate, off Montevideo, with the loss of some ninety officers and men.

In 1865 he joined HMS Narcissus, a wooden-hulled screw frigate, still on the South America station, and on 10 March 1870, still a Lieutenant, was posted to the new corvette Volage in the Channel Squadron. At the end of 1870 Volage transferred to a Flying Squadron which circumnavigated the world and did not return to England until the end of 1872. By an Order in Council dated 5 February 1872, Fullerton was promoted to the rank of commander. In 1874 Volage took a group of astronomers to the Kerguelen Islands to observe a transit of Venus.

In 1875 Fullerton joined the royal yacht HMY Victoria and Albert as second-in-command under Hugh Cambell, who died of typhoid fever on 12 February 1877. He was promoted captain on 10 January 1878, and on 18 January 1883 was posted as Captain to HMS Sapphire, an Amethyst-class wooden screw corvette of the China Squadron. However, he was soon called home, and on 15 October 1884 he was given command of the royal yacht Victoria and Albert II, a position he retained until 1901. On 1 January 1893 Fullerton was promoted rear-admiral and an Honorary Aide-de-Camp to HM the Queen, and in 1896 was made a companion in the civil division of the Order of the Bath. On 9 May 1899, at the time of Queen Victoria's visit to Cherbourg, he was knighted by being appointed a Knight Commander of the Royal Victorian Order and on 13 July of the same year was promoted vice-admiral. On 1 February 1901, the eve of the funeral of Queen Victoria, he was appointed a Knight Grand Cross of the Royal Victorian Order, and on 25 February was appointed an Honorary Naval Aide-de-Camp to the new King, Edward VII. In early 1903 he received the first class of the Prussian Order of the Crown, with brilliants, and was also a recipient of the Russian Order of St Anne, first class.

On 15 March 1904, Fullerton retired the service with the rank of full admiral.

There is a memorial to his memory in St Andrew's Church, Hamble-le-Rice, Hampshire.

== Private life ==
On 18 June 1874 Fullerton married Ada Capell, a daughter of Lieutenant-Colonel Edward Samuel Capell, who was a grandson of William Capell, 4th Earl of Essex. Their children were a daughter, Judith, and a son, Admiral Sir Eric Fullerton (1878–1962). In 1901 Judith married Lieutenant Sidney Julius Meyrick (1879–1973), who later became Admiral Sir Sidney Meyrick. In 1908 Eric married Dorothy Sibyl Fisher, one of the daughters of Admiral John Fisher, 1st Baron Fisher.
