= Dudley Conservation Park =

Protected area in South Australia

- IUCN category Ia (strict nature reserve)
- Location within South Australia
- Location: South Australia
- Nearest city: Kingscote
- Coordinates: 35°49′00″S 137°52′00″E
- Area: 1,768 ha (6.83 sq mi)
- Established: 1 January 1970
- Governing body: Department for Environment and Water

Dudley Conservation Park is a protected area in South Australia on the Dudley Peninsula on Kangaroo Island. It was dedicated in 1970 to conserve Kangaroo Island narrow-leaved mallee.

== Description ==
The conservation park has an area of 1,768 hectares (4,370 acres). It lies on the Dudley Peninsula on the eastern end of the island, about 10 km (6.2 mi)m south-east of American River and 12 km (7.5 mi) south-west of Penneshaw. The conservation park's vegetation is mostly an open scrub of Eucalyptus diversifolia and E. rugosa, with E. cneorifolia (the Kangaroo Island narrow-leaved mallee for which the park was dedicated) only occurring as an infrequent sub-dominant. There are limestone ridges and sandhill country in the south-eastern corner. The conservation park is classified as an IUCN Category Ia protected area.
