= Baudin Beach, South Australia =

Baudin Beach
- Town
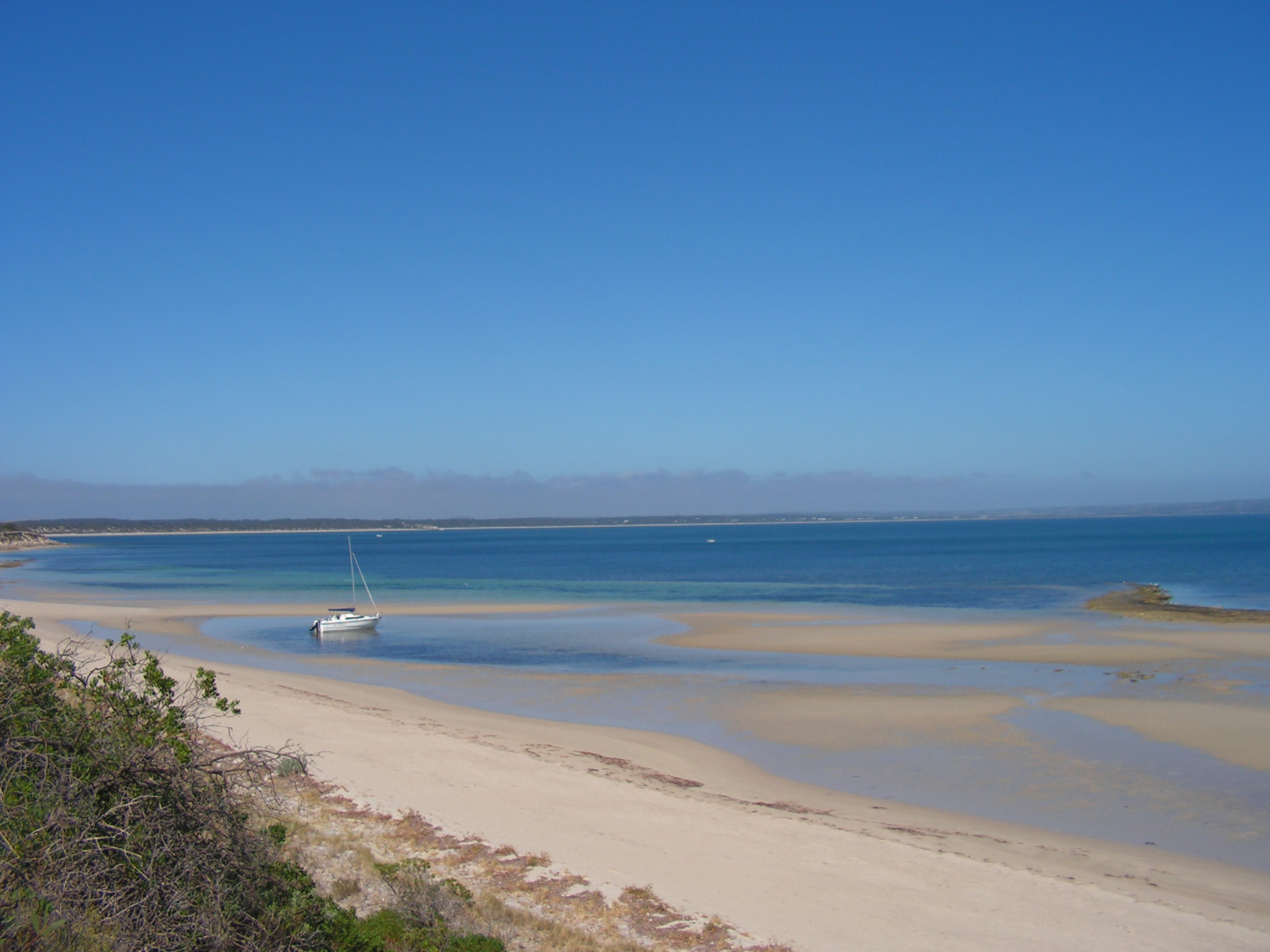
- Baudin Beach, Kangaroo Island

- Coordinates: 35.7834°S 137.8334°E
- Country: Australia
- State: South Australia
- Region: Fleurieu and Kangaroo Island
- LGA: Kangaroo Island Council
- Location: 115 km (71 mi) south of Adelaide; 12 km (7.5 mi) west of Penneshaw
- Established: 2002

Government
  - State electorate: Mawson
  - Federal division: Mayo

Population
  - Total: 94 (SAL 2021)
- Postcode: 5222
- County: Carnarvon
- Mean max temp: 18.1 °C (64.6 °F)
- Mean min temp: 12.8 °C (55.0 °F)
- Annual rainfall: 538.4 mm (21.20 in)
Localities around Baudin Beach
Nepean Bay	Nepean Bay	American Beach
Nepean Bay	Baudin Beach	Dudley West
Brown Beach	Dudley West	Dudley West
- Locations; Climate; Adjoining localities

Baudin Beach is a locality in the Australian state of South Australia located on Dudley Peninsula on the north coast of Kangaroo Island about 115 kilometres (71 miles) south of the capital city of Adelaide and about 12 kilometres (7.5 miles) west of Penneshaw. It is named in 2002 after the French navigator Nicolas Baudin in honor of his exploration of Kangaroo Island in 1802.

Prior to 2002, Baudin Beach was known as American Beach, being the name given to the land subdivision of the area in 1966. The name was changed in 2002 to avoid confusion with the originally named American Beach which is located a short distance north of the subdivision. The area was once known as Deep Creek Farm, owned by Bruce Bates of Penneshaw. Bates sold the land to Clem Bessell in 1966, who in conjunction with real estate agent Cliff Hawkins subdivided the area which is still often referred to as "Bessell's".

The name Baudin Beach was officially gazetted in March 2002.

Baudin Beach comprises 207 allotments, each mainly in excess of 800 square metres. Some 30% of the allotments are a mix of permanent and holiday homes, the remaining allotments being undeveloped.

There are no shopping facilities in Baudin Beach. Next to the boat ramp is a copper sculpture, unveiled in 2002, of Mary Beckwith, reputedly the first recorded European woman to set foot on South Australian soil.

The waters of Eastern Cove immediately adjoining Baudin Beach are renowned for King George whiting.

Baudin Beach is located within the federal division of Mayo, the state electoral district of Mawson and the local government area of the Kangaroo Island Council.
