= Dudley West, South Australia =

Dudley West
- Town
- Coordinates: 35.811610°S 137.871230°E
- Country: Australia
- State: South Australia
- Region: Fleurieu and Kangaroo Island
- LGA: Kangaroo Island Council
- Location: 118 km (73 mi) south of Adelaide city centre; 11 km (6.8 mi) south of Penneshaw
- Established: 2002

Government
  - State electorate: Mawson
  - Federal division: Mayo

Population
  - Total: 25 (SAL 2021)
- Time zone: UTC+9:30 (ACST)
  - Summer (DST): UTC+10:30 (ACST)
- Postcode: 5222
- County: Carnarvon
- Mean max temp: 18.1 °C (64.6 °F)
- Mean min temp: 12.8 °C (55.0 °F)
- Annual rainfall: 538.4 mm (21.20 in)
Localities around Dudley West
Island Beach	Kangaroo Head; American Beach; Brown Beach	Dudley East
Pelican Lagoon	Dudley West	Willson River
Ocean	Ocean	Ocean
- Coordinates; Locations; Climate; Adjoining localities

Dudley West is a locality in the Australian state of South Australia located on the south coast of Dudley Peninsula on Kangaroo Island overlooking the body of water known in Australia as the Southern Ocean and by international authorities as the Great Australian Bight. It is located about 107 kilometres (66 miles) south of the Adelaide city centre and about 11 kilometres (6.8 miles) south-west of Penneshaw.

Its boundaries were created in March 2002 for the “long established name.” The locality is reported as being so named because it is located in the western part of the cadastral unit of the Hundred of Dudley.

The land use within the locality is divided between agriculture and conservation with the latter land use being concerned with both the protected area, the Dudley Conservation Park, and land being subject to native vegetation heritage agreements.

Dudley West is located within the federal division of Mayo, the state electoral district of Mawson and the local government area of the Kangaroo Island Council.
