= Brownlow KI, South Australia =

Brownlow KI
- Town
- Coordinates: 35.6699°S 137.613930°E
- Country: Australia
- State: South Australia
- Region: Fleurieu and Kangaroo Island
- LGA: Kangaroo Island Council
- Location: 122 km (76 mi) south of Adelaide; 3 km (1.9 mi) south of Kingscote
- Established: 1882

Government
  - State electorate: Mawson
  - Federal division: Mayo

Population
  - Total: 238 (SAL 2021)
- Time zone: UTC+9:30 (ACST)
  - Summer (DST): UTC+10:30 (ACST)
- Postcode: 5223
- County: Carnarvon
- Mean max temp: 19.1 °C (66.4 °F)
- Mean min temp: 11.6 °C (52.9 °F)
- Annual rainfall: 488.9 mm (19.25 in)
Localities around Brownlow KI
Kingscote	Kingscote	Kingscote
Kingscote	Brownlow KI	Nepean Bay
Cygnet River	Cygnet River	Nepean Bay
- Coordinates; Locations; Climate; Adjoining localities

Brownlow (officially Brownlow KI) is a locality in the Australian state of South Australia, located on the east coast of Kangaroo Island overlooking Nepean Bay. It is about 122 kilometres (76 miles) south of the state capital of Adelaide and about 3 kilometres (1.9 miles) south of the municipal seat of Kingscote.

The name was first used for a government town which was surveyed in January 1882 and proclaimed during June 1882. Boundaries for the locality which include the former government town were created in March 2002 for the “long established name.” The name is reported as being derived from Field Marshal Sir Charles Henry Brownlow.

The locality is officially known as Brownlow KI; the abbreviation “KI” was added during May 2002 in order to avoid confusion with the locality of Brownlow located within both the Mid Murray Council and the Regional Council of Goyder.

The principal land use within the locality is residential accommodation while a strip of land along its coastline is zoned for conservation.

Brownlow is located within the federal division of Mayo, the state electoral district of Mawson and the local government area of the Kangaroo Island Council.

== See also ==
- Brownlow (disambiguation)
