= Ballast (disambiguation) =

Ballast is any dense material used as a weight to provide stability to a vehicle or structure.

It may also refer to:

== Places ==
- Ballast, Coevorden, a village in the northeastern Netherlands
- Ballast Head, a headland on Kangaroo Island, Australia
  - Ballast Head, South Australia, a locality
- Ballast Point (Tampa), a neighborhood in Tampa, Florida, US

== Other ==
- Electrical ballast, used to stabilize the current flow in lamps
- Ballast tractor, a heavy-haulage road vehicle designed to pull or push heavy or exceptionally large loads
- Track ballast, the layer of crushed rock or gravel upon which railway track is laid
- Ballast (film), a 2008 film about the effect of one man's suicide on three people
- Ballast (website), a Canadian news and cultural website
- "Ballast", a 1967 story of The Railway Series book Small Railway Engines
