= Kangaroo Head, South Australia =

Kangaroo Head
- Town
- Coordinates: 35.734570°S 137.905030°E
- Country: Australia
- State: South Australia
- Region: Fleurieu and Kangaroo Island
- LGA: Kangaroo Island Council
- Location: 110 km (68 mi) south of Adelaide
- Established: 2002

Government
  - State electorate: Mawson
  - Federal division: Mayo

Population
  - Total: 18 (SAL 2021)
- Time zone: UTC+9:30 (ACST)
  - Summer (DST): UTC+10:30 (ACST)
- Postcode: 5222
- County: Carnarvon
- Mean max temp: 19.1 °C (66.4 °F)
- Mean min temp: 11.6 °C (52.9 °F)
- Annual rainfall: 488.9 mm (19.25 in)
Localities around Kangaroo Head
Nepean Bay	Investigator Strait	Backstairs Passage
Nepean Bay	Kangaroo Head	Penneshaw; Dudley East
American Beach	Dudley West	Dudley East
- Coordinates; Locations; Climate; Adjoining localities

Kangaroo Head is a locality in the Australian state of South Australia located on the north coast of Dudley Peninsula on Kangaroo Island overlooking both Backstairs Passage and Nepean Bay about 110 kilometres (68 miles) south of the state capital of Adelaide.

Its boundaries were created in March 2002 for the “long established name” which is derived from Kangaroo Head, a headland located within the locality.

As of 2015, Kangaroo Head consists generally of a strip of land located between the Hog Bay Road and the coastline with Backstairs Passage and Nepean Bay. The majority land use in the locality is agriculture.

Kangaroo Head is located within the federal division of Mayo, the state electoral district of Mawson and the local government area of the Kangaroo Island Council.

== See also ==
- Kangaroo (disambiguation)
