= Muston, South Australia =

Muston
- Town
- Coordinates: 35.8075°S 137.735°E
- Country: Australia
- State: South Australia
- Region: Fleurieu and Kangaroo Island
- LGA: Kangaroo Island Council
- Location: 127 km (79 mi) south-west of Adelaide; 21 km (13 mi) south-east of Kingscote
- Established: 2002

Government
  - State electorate: Mawson
  - Federal division: Mayo

Population
  - Total: 34 (SAL 2021)
- Time zone: UTC+9:30 (ACST)
  - Summer (DST): UTC+10:30 (ACST)
- Postcode: 5221
- County: County of Carnarvon
- Mean max temp: 19.1 °C (66.4 °F)
- Mean min temp: 11.6 °C (52.9 °F)
- Annual rainfall: 488.9 mm (19.25 in)
Localities around Muston
Ballast Head	Ballast Head	American River
Haines	Muston	American River; Pelican Lagoon; Pelican Lagoon
Haines	Haines	Pelican Lagoon
- Coordinates; Locations; Climate; Adjoining localities

Muston is a locality in the Australian state of South Australia located on Kangaroo Island overlooking the coastal lagoon known as Pelican Lagoon about 127 kilometres (79 miles) south-west of the state capital of Adelaide and about 21 kilometres (13 miles) south-east of the municipal seat of Kingscote.

Its boundaries were created in March 2002 for the “long established name” which was derived from Arthur Muston, the founder of the Colonial Salt Company which became the Commonwealth Salt Refining Company in 1905. A railway line which operated from 1910 to 1954 passed through what is the locality from a salt mining operation at Salt Lake in what is now the adjoining locality of Haines moving salt to a now-demolished jetty on the Pelican Lagoon coastline where it was loaded and shipped to Edithburgh for refining.

Muston is bounded by the American River Road in part to the west, the Hog Bay Road to the south and by the coastline with Pelican Lagoon in part to the east. The principal land use in the locality is primary production with a strip of land on the coastline being zoned both for conservation and as a settlement described as a ‘rural living precinct’.

Muston is located within the federal division of Mayo, the state electoral district of Mawson and the local government area of the Kangaroo Island Council.

== See also ==
- Muston (disambiguation)
