= Sapphiretown, South Australia =

Sapphiretown
- Town
- Coordinates: 35.79118694°S 137.78309723°E
- Country: Australia
- State: South Australia
- Region: Fleurieu and Kangaroo Island
- LGA: Kangaroo Island Council
- Location: 121 km (75 mi) south of Adelaide; 16 km (9.9 mi) southwest of Penneshaw
- Established: 1878

Government
  - State electorate: Mawson
  - Federal division: Mayo

Population
  - Total: 21 (SAL 2021)
- Time zone: UTC+9:30 (ACST)
  - Summer (DST): UTC+10:30 (ACST)
- Postcode: 5222
- County: Carnarvon
- Mean max temp: 19.1 °C (66.4 °F)
- Mean min temp: 11.6 °C (52.9 °F)
- Annual rainfall: 488.9 mm (19.25 in)
Localities around Sapphiretown
Nepean Bay	Nepean Bay	Nepean Bay
Nepean Bay	Sapphiretown	Island Beach
Pelican Lagoon	Pelican Lagoon	Island Beach
- Coordinates; Locations; Climate; Adjoining localities

Sapphiretown is a locality in the Australian state of South Australia located on the north coast of Dudley Peninsula on Kangaroo Island overlooking Eastern Cove about 121 kilometres (75 miles) south of the state capital of Adelaide and about 16 kilometres (9.9 miles) south-west of Penneshaw.

The locality was originally declared as a government town in January 1878 by Sir William Jervois, the tenth governor of South Australia for a site surveyed in March 1877. The locality's boundaries which were created in March 2002 include the former government town of Sapphiretown. The name is derived from HMS Sapphire, a sloop, which conveyed Jervois to South Australia in October 1877 to take up his appointment as Governor of South Australia.

As of 2014, Sapphiretown consisted of land at the western end of Dudley Peninsula and which concludes as a spit known as Strawbridge Point at its north-western extremity and which is bounded to the north by Eastern Cove in Nepean Bay and by the body of water known as American River to the west. The locality is zoned for residential use exclusively for “detached dwellings” and “tourist accommodation.”

Sapphiretown is located within the federal division of Mayo, the state electoral district of Mawson and the local government area of the Kangaroo Island Council.

== See also ==
- Sapphire (disambiguation)
