= Brown Beach, South Australia =

Brown Beach
- Town
- Coordinates: 35.798080°S 137.844260°E
- Country: Australia
- State: South Australia
- Region: Fleurieu and Kangaroo Island
- LGA: Kangaroo Island Council
- Location: 119 km (74 mi) south-west of Adelaide
- Established: 2002

Government
  - State electorate: Mawson
  - Federal division: Mayo

Population
  - Total: 3 (SAL 2021)
- Time zone: UTC+9:30 (ACST)
  - Summer (DST): UTC+10:30 (ACST)
- Postcode: 5222
- County: Carnarvon
- Mean max temp: 19.1 °C (66.4 °F)
- Mean min temp: 11.6 °C (52.9 °F)
- Annual rainfall: 488.9 mm (19.25 in)
Localities around Brown Beach
Nepean Bay	Nepean Bay	Baudin Beach
Island Beach	Brown Beach	Dudley West
Pelican Lagoon	Dudley West	Dudley West
- Coordinates; Locations; Climate; Adjoining localities

Brown Beach is a locality in the Australian state of South Australia located on the north coast of Dudley Peninsula on Kangaroo Island overlooking Nepean Bay about 119 kilometres (74 miles) south-west of the state capital of Adelaide. Its boundaries were created in March 2002. The name is derived from a nearby beach of the same name. As of 2015, Brown Beach consists of a strip of land located between the coastline with Nepean Bay and the Hog Bay Road. The locality is zoned for conservation purposes with the view of providing limited built development intended principally for tourism uses, which has a minimal impact and where provided, complements the environment of the locality. Brown Beach is located within the federal division of Mayo, the state electoral district of Mawson and the local government area of the Kangaroo Island Council.
