= Haines, South Australia =

Haines
- Town
- Coordinates: 35.810660°S 137.647710°E
- Country: Australia
- State: South Australia
- Region: Fleurieu and Kangaroo Island
- LGA: Kangaroo Island Council
- Location: 129 km (80 mi) south-west of Adelaide; 17 km (11 mi) south of Kingscote
- Established: 2002

Government
  - State electorate: Mawson
  - Federal division: Mayo

Population
  - Total: 163 (SAL 2021)
- Time zone: UTC+9:30 (ACST)
  - Summer (DST): UTC+10:30 (ACST)
- Postcode: 5223
- County: Carnarvon
- Mean max temp: 20.9 °C (69.6 °F)
- Mean min temp: 9.0 °C (48.2 °F)
- Annual rainfall: 454.8 mm (17.91 in)
Localities around Haines
| Cygnet River | Nepean Bay; Ballast Head | Ballast Head |
| MacGillivray | Haines | Ballast Head; Muston; Pelican Lagoon; Ocean |
| MacGillivray | D’Estrees Bay; Ocean | Ocean |
- Coordinates; Locations; Climate; Adjoining localities

Haines is a locality in the Australian state of South Australia located on the south coast of Kangaroo Island overlooking the body of water known in Australia as the Southern Ocean and by international authorities as the Great Australian Bight. It is located about 129 kilometres (80 miles) south-west of the state capital of Adelaide and about 17 kilometres (11 miles) south of the municipal seat of Kingscote.

Its boundaries were created in March 2002 for the “long established name” which was derived from the cadastral unit of the Hundred of Haines.

The principal land use in the locality is primary production with land along the coastline and land occupied by the Beyeria Conservation Park being both zoned for conservation purposes.

Haines is located within the federal division of Mayo, the state electoral district of Mawson and the local government area of the Kangaroo Island Council.

== See also ==
- Haines (disambiguation)
