= Pelican Lagoon =

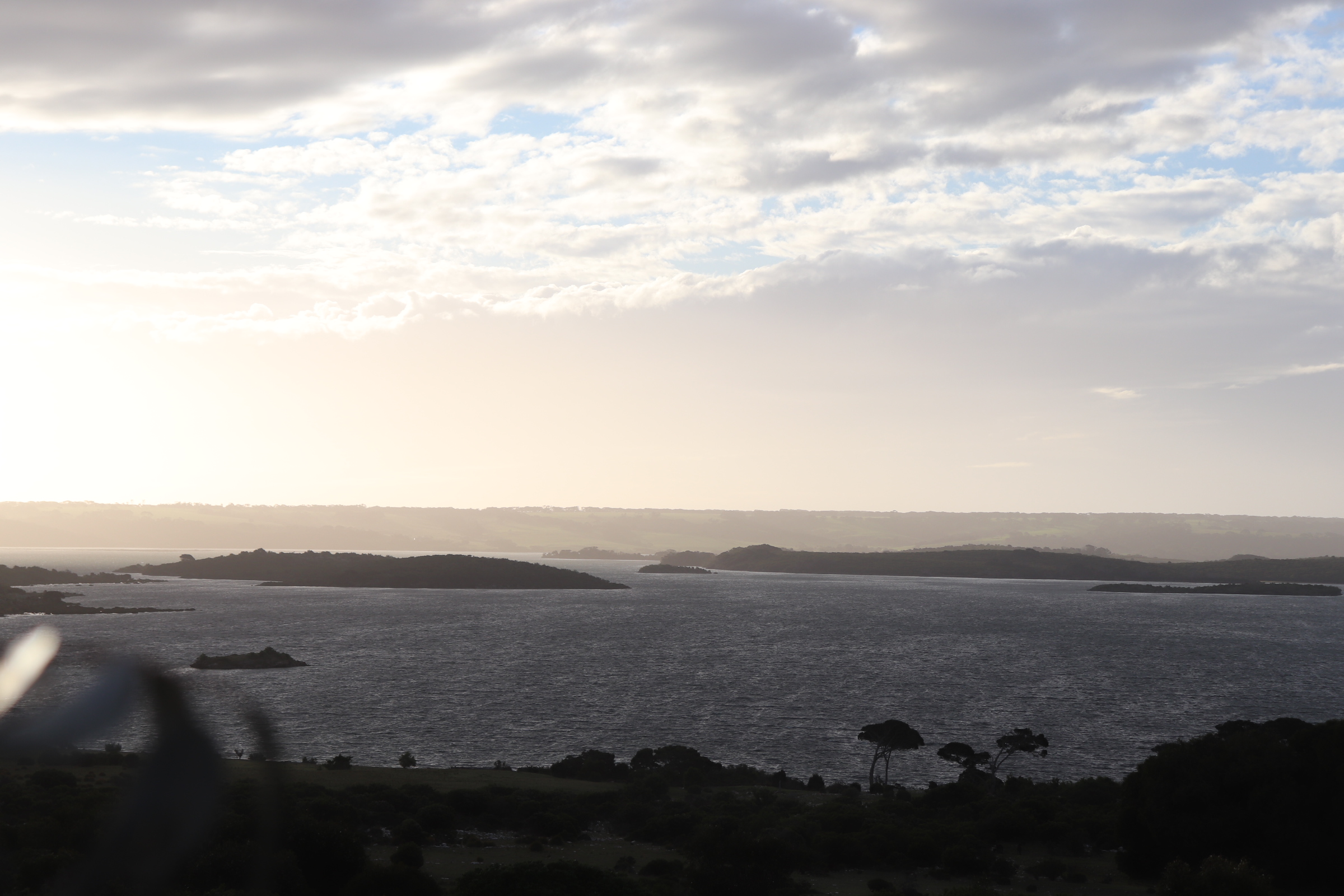
- Pelican Lagoon

- Location in South Australia
- Location: Kangaroo Island, South Australia
- Coordinates: 35°49′10″S 137°47′24″E
- Type: seawater lagoon
- Basin countries: Australia
- Max. length: 4.5 km (2.8 mi).
- Max. width: 6 km (3.7 mi)
- Surface area: 1,520 ha (3,800 acres)
- Max. depth: 10 m (33 ft)
- Salinity: sea water
- Islands: Bird Islet, Goanna Islet, Pig Islet, Rabbit Islet, Shag Rock, Samphire Islet, Wallaby Islet and several unnamed islands
- Settlements: Pelican Lagoon; Muston

Pelican Lagoon is a seawater lagoon in the Australian state of South Australia located on the north coast of Kangaroo Island about 18.7 kilometres (11.6 miles) south east of Kingscote. It was named by Matthew Flinders on 4 April 1802 after the large population of pelicans present in its waters and adjoining shorelines. Its role as fishery hatchery had been identified by the early 20th century with the result that fishing in its waters has been restricted in varying degrees.

Since 1971, the entire lagoon was part of a marine protected area known as the American River Aquatic Reserve (abolished 2016), where all fishing and the collection of marine organisms is prohibited. Since 2012, the Pelican Lagoon Sanctuary Zone has been within Encounter Marine Park and managed by National Parks South Australia. The lagoon is probably the oldest marine protected area in South Australia, having been protected since 1914.

== Description ==
Pelican Lagoon is a seawater lagoon located about 2.9 kilometres (1.8 miles) south of American River and about 18.7 kilometres (11.6 miles) south east of Kingscote. The lagoon is bounded by Dudley Peninsula to the east, the main body of Kangaroo Island to the west, an isthmus connecting the above-mentioned bodies of land to the south and an unnamed peninsula to the north that separates it from Eastern Cove. The lagoon is connected to Eastern Cove in Nepean Bay by an inlet named American River. Hog Bay Road which is the main road connecting Penneshaw to Kingscote passes on the east and south sides of the lagoon.

The lagoon itself consists of two branches - one on the east side and the other on the west side which was described as being the ‘southern branch’ by Flinders in 1802. The lagoon is drained of water by tidal flow via a narrow channel of 3 to 5 metres (9.8–16.4 ft) in depth and which passes through the west branch in order to reach the east branch. The tidal flow is reported as being as high as 3 kn (5.6 km/h; 3.5 mph).

The west branch has an average water depth of 0.9 metres (2 feet 11 inches) presumably at low water while the eastern branch has several deeper areas - the majority of its north side ranges in depth from 3 to 9.9 metres (9.8–32.5 ft) and its south side has a number of deeper areas in the range of 1 to 2.9 metres (3.3–9.5 ft).

=== Islets ===
A number of islets are present within Pelican Lagoon. Six of these are named as follows (from east to west): Rabbit Islet, Bird Islet, Goanna Islet, Pig Islet, Wallaby Islet, Shag Rock and Samphire Islet.

== Flora and fauna ==
=== Flora ===
==== Terrestrial ====
The islands within the lagoon support heathlands dominated by Coastal Daisybush and Thyme Riceflower. The coastline enclosing the lagoon supports a range of vegetation types dominated by heathlands of Acacia leiophylla and Orthrosanthus multiflorus, herb lands of Senecio odoratus, coastal mallee scrub of Eucalyptus diversifolia, samphire flats and grazed grasslands.

==== Intertidal and sub tidal ====
Samphire grows on the mud flats within the lagoon which are exposed at low water. The subtidal areas of the lagoon are dominated by the seagrass species of Heterozostera tasmanica and Posidonia australis. Various algae species are also present.

=== Fauna ===
==== Terrestrial ====
Waterbirds that use the lagoon include nine species that breed in the locality such as the chestnut teal, pied oystercatcher, sooty oystercatcher and caspian tern. Seventeen waterbird species are listed on international migratory treaties with sixteen listed on the Japan-Australia Migratory Bird Agreement (JAMBA) and seventeen listed on the China-Australia Migratory Bird Agreement (CAMBA). As of 1996, Black tiger snakes were reported as being present on the islands within the lagoon.

==== Intertidal and sub tidal ====
The lagoon is reported as a breeding site for the little penguin. The lagoon supports a number of marine animal species considered to be commercially valuable. These include sand crab, king scallop, queen scallop, razorfish (Pinna bicolor), southern calamari, flathead, King George whiting, leatherjacket, red mullet, snook, Southern Sea garfish, tommy ruff, trevally and Western Australian salmon. The lagoon is also reported as being home for a pod of bottle-nosed dolphins.

== History ==
=== European discovery and use ===
The lagoon was discovered by Flinders on 4 April 1802 and was named in recognition of the large pelican population present at the time. Since the establishment of South Australia, the lagoon has also been known as American River. The islands within the lagoon were mined for guano under licence from the South Australian Government prior to 1919. As early as May 1905, fishing by the use of nets was prohibited both in Pelican Lagoon and adjoining waters in both American River and Eastern Cove. As early as 1908, the role of ‘Pelican Lagoon on the American River’ as a hatchery area was acknowledged by the South Australian government via statements attributed to Mr. S. McIntosh, the then Deputy Chief Inspector of Fisheries. By early 1925, the lagoon was reported as being closed to all types of fishing. The islands within the lagoon first obtained protected area status as a fauna conservation reserve declared under the Crown Lands Act 1929-1966 on 16 March 1967.

== Ports and other settlements ==
Pelican Lagoon is bounded to the west by the locality of Muston and to the south and to the east by the locality of Pelican Lagoon which both include land zoned for residential accommodation

== Protected area status ==
The lagoon is associated with three protected areas:

- American River Aquatic Reserve, which covered the entire lagoon, but was abolished in 2016.
- Pelican Lagoon Conservation Park, which includes five of the islands in the lagoon and much of the land on the peninsula to the north of the lagoon.
- Since 2012, the Pelican Lagoon Sanctuary Zone has been within Encounter Marine Park and managed by National Parks South Australia. The lagoon is probably the oldest marine protected area in South Australia, having been protected since 1914.

The lagoon is also appears on a list of nationally important wetlands in South Australia as part of the "American River Wetland System".

== Citations and references ==
=== References ===
- "American River Marine and Coastal Area, Sapphiretown Rd, American River, SA (Place ID 100822)". Australian Heritage Database. Australian Government.
- Anon (2001). A Directory of Important Wetlands in Australia (PDF). 3rd edition. Canberra.: Environment Australia. ISBN 0-642-54721-1.
- Anon (1987). Conservation Parks of Kangaroo Island Management Plan (PDF). Adelaide: Department of Environment and Planning, South Australia. ISBN 0-7243-8983-0.
- Boating Industry Association of South Australia (BIA); South Australia. Department for Environment and Heritage (2005), South Australia's waters an atlas & guide, Boating Industry Association of South Australia, ISBN 978-1-86254-680-6
- South Australia. Department of Marine and Harbors (DMH) (1985), The Waters of South Australia a series of charts, sailing notes and coastal photographs, Dept. of Marine and Harbors, South Australia, ISBN 978-0-7243-7603-2
- "Development Plan, Kangaroo Island Council, Consolidated – 20 February 2014" (PDF). Department of Planning, Transport and Infrastructure (DPTI).
- Flinders, Matthew (1966) [1814]. A Voyage to Terra Australis : undertaken for the purpose of completing the discovery of that vast country, and prosecuted in the years 1801, 1802, and 1803 in His Majesty's ship the Investigator, and subsequently in the armed vessel Porpoise and Cumberland Schooner; with an account of the shipwreck of the Porpoise, arrival of the Cumberland at Mauritius, and imprisonment of the commander during six years and a half in that island (Facsimile ed.). Adelaide: Libraries Board of South Australia.
- Primary Industries and Regions South Australia (PIRSA) (2007). "Aquatic Reserve: American River" (PDF). Primary Industries and Regions South Australia. Archived from the original (PDF) on 5 April 2015.
- Primary Industries and Regions South Australia (PIRSA) (2012), Management Plan for the Pelican Lagoon Aquatic Reserve; The South Australian Fisheries Management Series Paper number 56 (PDF), Primary Industries and Regions South Australia, ISBN 978-0-9807387-2-8, archived from the original on 4 September 2014
- Robinson, A. C.; Canty, P.; Mooney, T.; Rudduck, P. (1996). "South Australia's offshore islands" (PDF). Australian Heritage Commission. ISBN 978-0-644-35011-2.
