= Muston =

Muston may refer to:

== Placenames ==
- Muston, Leicestershire, England
- Muston, North Yorkshire, England
- Muston, South Australia, a locality on Kangaroo Island

== People ==
- Muston (surname)
