= Island Beach, South Australia =

Island Beach
- Town
- Coordinates: 35°48′0″S 137°48′36″E
- Country: Australia
- State: South Australia
- Region: Fleurieu and Kangaroo Island
- LGA: Kangaroo Island Council
- Location: 121 km (75 mi) south of Adelaide; 21 km (13 mi) south-west of Penneshaw

Government
  - State electorate: Mawson
  - Federal division: Mayo

Population
  - Total: 71 (SAL 2021)
- Time zone: UTC+9:30 (ACST)
  - Summer (DST): UTC+10:30 (ACDT)
- Postcode: 5222
- County: Carnarvon
- Mean max temp: 19.1 °C (66.4 °F)
- Mean min temp: 11.6 °C (52.9 °F)
- Annual rainfall: 488.9 mm (19.25 in)
Localities around Island Beach
| Nepean Bay | Nepean Bay | Nepean Bay |
| Sapphiretown | Island Beach | Brown Beach |
| Pelican Lagoon | Pelican Lagoon | Dudley West |
- Location; Climate; Adjoining localities

Island Beach is a locality in the Australian state of South Australia overlooking Eastern Cove in Nepean Bay on the north-west coast of the Dudley Peninsula on Kangaroo Island about 121 kilometres (75 miles) from the state capital of Adelaide and about 21 kilometres (13 miles) from Penneshaw.

John Stewart Browne subdivided Island Beach in 1961 into 254 allotments, with average block sizes exceeding 1,000 square metres (11,000 square feet). Development stalled for a number of years, due largely to a reluctance of the local council to construct roads through the estate, which under planning regulations of the time were not the responsibility of the developer.

In the late 1970s a separate land subdivision occurred to the south of the original estate. Known locally as Carter's Estate, these allotments were more traditionally under 1,000 square metres (11,000 square feet) in size. Throughout the late 1980s and beyond, development accelerated with substantial seafront residences being erected, and land values beginning to rise.

There is limited access to the beach for boat launching and retrieval.[8]

Island Beach is located within the federal division of Mayo, the state electoral district of Mawson and the local government area of the Kangaroo Island Council.
