= Pelican Lagoon, South Australia =

Pelican Lagoon
- Town
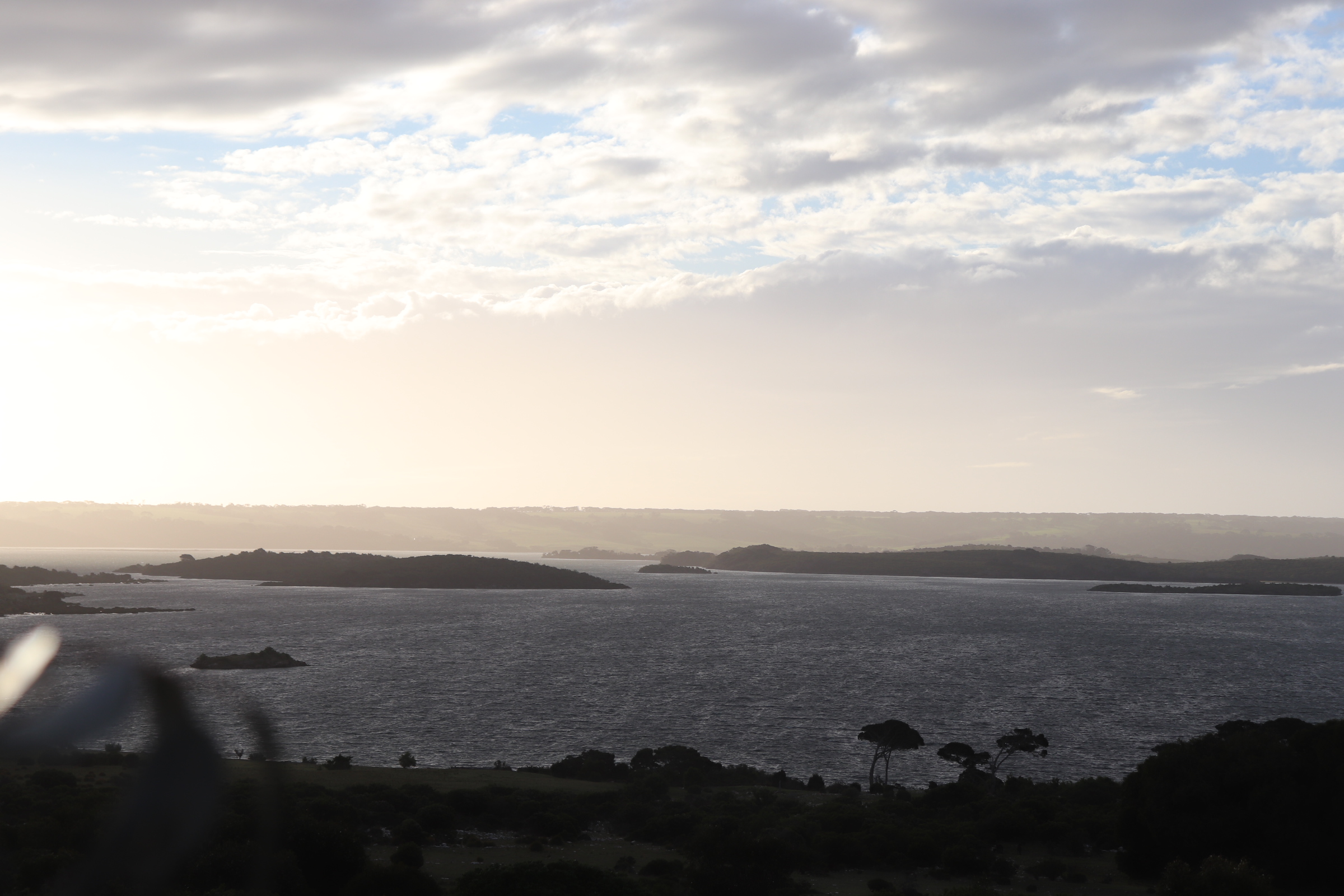
- View of Pelican Lagoon

- Coordinates: 35.832580°S 137.815260°E
- Country: Australia
- State: South Australia
- Region: Fleurieu and Kangaroo Island
- LGA: Kangaroo Island Council
- Location: 123 km (76 mi) south of Adelaide; 17 km (11 mi) southwest of Penneshaw
- Established: 2002

Government
  - State electorate: Mawson
  - Federal division: Mayo

Population
  - Total: 48 (SAL 2021)
- Time zone: UTC+9:30 (ACST)
  - Summer (DST): UTC+10:30 (ACST)
- Postcode: 5222
- County: County of Carnarvon
- Mean max temp: 19.1 °C (66.4 °F)
- Mean min temp: 11.6 °C (52.9 °F)
- Annual rainfall: 488.9 mm (19.25 in)
Localities around Pelican Lagoon
American River (body of water)	Sapphiretown; Island Beach	Brown Beach
Pelican Lagoon; Muston; Haines	Pelican Lagoon	Dudley West
Ocean	Ocean	Ocean
- Coordinates; Locations; Climate; Adjoining localities

Pelican Lagoon is a locality in the Australian state of South Australia located on the south coast of Dudley Peninsula on Kangaroo Island overlooking the body of water known in Australia as the Southern Ocean and by international authorities as the Great Australian Bight. It is located about 123 kilometres (76 miles) south of the state capital of Adelaide and about 17 kilometres (11 miles) south-west of Penneshaw.

The locality’s boundaries were created in March 2002 for the “long established name” which is derived from Pelican Lagoon, the seawater lagoon which adjoins the locality to the west.

As of 2014, Pelican Lagoon consisted of land at the western end of Dudley Peninsula which adjoins the seawater lagoon of Pelican Lagoon on its north, east and west sides including the isthmus to the south that connects the peninsula to the west part of Kangaroo Island and which adjoins the island’s southern coastline. Land within the locality is zoned for agriculture, conservation including the Pelican Lagoon Conservation Park and residential use.

The locality includes a threshing floor which is listed on the South Australian Heritage Register.

Pelican Lagoon is located within the federal division of Mayo, the state electoral district of Mawson and the local government area of the Kangaroo Island Council.
