= Willson River, South Australia =

Willson River
- Town
- Coordinates: 35.846690°S 137.937850°E
- Country: Australia
- State: South Australia
- Region: Fleurieu and Kangaroo Island
- LGA: Kangaroo Island Council
- Location: 120 km (75 mi) south of Adelaide; 15 km (9.3 mi) south of Penneshaw
- Established: 2002

Government
  - State electorate: Mawson
  - Federal division: Mayo

Population
  - Total: 6 (SAL 2021)
- Time zone: UTC+9:30 (ACST)
  - Summer (DST): UTC+10:30 (ACST)
- Postcode: 5222
- County: Carnarvon
- Mean max temp: 18.1 °C (64.6 °F)
- Mean min temp: 12.8 °C (55.0 °F)
- Annual rainfall: 538.4 mm (21.20 in)
Localities around Willson River
Dudley West	Dudley East	Dudley East
Dudley West	Willson River	Porky Flat
Ocean	Ocean	Ocean
- Coordinates; Locations; Climate; Adjoining localities

Willson River is a locality in the Australian state of South Australia located on the Dudley Peninsula on Kangaroo Island overlooking the body of water known in Australia as the Southern Ocean and by international authorities as the Great Australian Bight. It is located about 120 kilometres (75 miles) south of the state capital of Adelaide and about 15 kilometres (9.3 miles) south-west of the town centre of Penneshaw.

Its boundaries were created in March 2002 while its name was derived from the Willson River, a river which flows through the locality and which itself was named in 1885 after the Willson family who have resided in what is now the locality prior to 1885 and as recently as 1996.

The main land uses within the locality are agriculture and conservation. The former land use includes an area of privately owned land having protected status due to being subject to native vegetation heritage agreements while the latter use includes land adjoining the coastline which has additional statutory constraints to “conserve the natural features of the coast.”

Willson River is located within the federal division of Mayo, the state electoral district of Mawson and the local government area of the Kangaroo Island Council.
