= American Beach, South Australia =

American Beach
- Town
- Coordinates: 35°46′08″S 137°52′49″E
- Country: Australia
- State: South Australia
- Region: Fleurieu and Kangaroo Island
- LGA: Kangaroo Island Council
- Location: 115 km (71 mi) south-west of Adelaide; 25 km (16 mi) east of Kingscote
- Established: 2002

Government
  - State electorate: Mawson
  - Federal division: Mayo

Population
  - Total: 0 (SAL 2021)
- Time zone: UTC+9:30 (ACST)
  - Summer (DST): UTC+10:30 (ACST)
- Postcode: 5222
- County: Carnarvon
- Mean max temp: 18.1 °C (64.6 °F)
- Mean min temp: 12.8 °C (55.0 °F)
- Annual rainfall: 538.4 mm (21.20 in)
Localities around American Beach
Nepean Bay	Nepean Bay	Kangaroo Head
Nepean Bay	American Beach	Dudley West
Baudin Beach	Dudley West	Dudley West
- Coordinates; Locations; Climate; Adjoining localities

American Beach is a locality in South Australia on the north coast of the Dudley Peninsula on Kangaroo Island, overlooking Nepean Bay, about 115 kilometres (71 miles) south-west of Adelaide.

The name is derived from the nearby beach of the same name. The locality is zoned for conservation purposes with the view of providing limited built development intended principally for tourism uses, which has a minimal impact and where provided, complements the environment of the locality.

The gazetted locality boundaries were created in March 2002. As of 2015, it consists of a strip of land located between the coastline with Nepean Bay and the Hog Bay Road. It is “not to be confused with the former American Beach Estate subdivision”, which was also gazetted in 2002 as Baudin Beach.

American Beach is located within the federal division of Mayo, the state electoral district of Mawson and the local government area of the Kangaroo Island Council.
