= American River Aquatic Reserve =

Protected area in South Australia

- IUCN category II (national park)
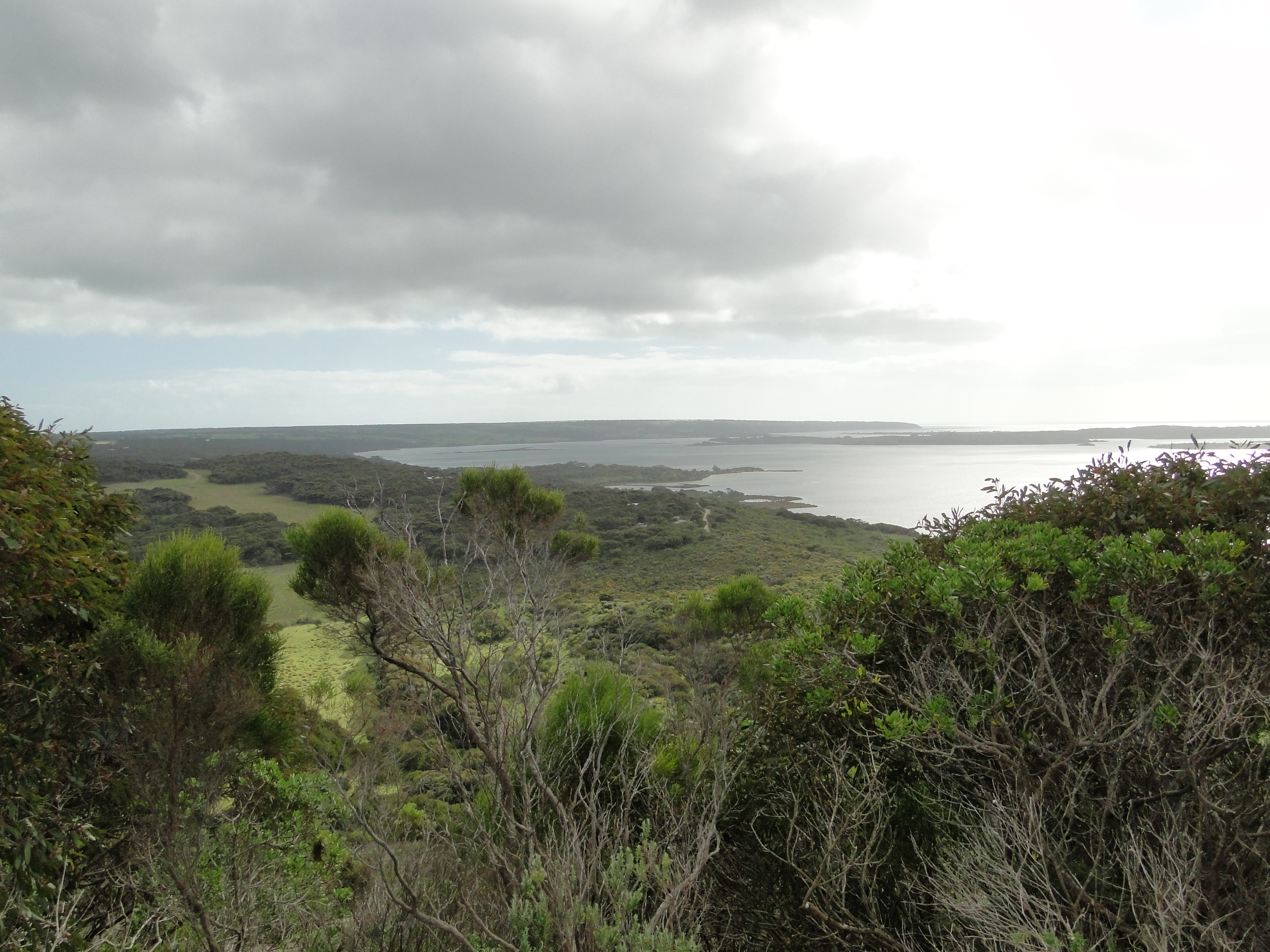

- Location within South Australia
- Location: South Australia
- Nearest city: American River
- Coordinates: 35.8194°S 137.7795°E
- Area: 15.39 km^{2} (5.94 sq mi)
- Established: 1 December 1971
- Governing body: Primary Industries and Regions SA (PIRSA)

American River Aquatic Reserve was a marine protected area in the Australian state of South Australia located on the north coast of Kangaroo Island in waters of the coastal lagoon known as Pelican Lagoon, in existence from 1971 to 2016. From 2012, the Pelican Lagoon Sanctuary Zone has fallen within the Encounter Marine Park. Pelican Lagoon is probably the oldest marine protected area in South Australia, having been protected since 1914.

It was classified as an IUCN Category II protected area. On 20 October 2016, the reserve was abolished.

== History and description ==
American River Aquatic Reserve, also called the Pelican Lagoon Aquatic Reserve in some sources, was declared on 30 November 1971 under the Fisheries Act 1971 and was re-proclaimed in 2007 following the enactment of the Fisheries Management Act 2007. In 1987, it was reported as being the oldest operating aquatic reserve created under fisheries legislation in South Australia.

From 2012, it was located within the boundaries of a "sanctuary zone" within the Encounter Marine Park.

The aquatic reserve was classified as an IUCN Category II protected area.

On 20 October 2016, the reserve was abolished.

== Description ==
The purpose of the aquatic reserve was to "protect seagrass mudflats and to provide a sanctuary for juvenile and adult fish, including whiting". This was achieved by the prohibition of both fishing and the collection of marine organisms within its waters. Access was permitted and activities such as birdwatching, boating, swimming and recreational diving (i.e. snorkelling and scuba diving) were also permitted. The aquatic reserve covered the full extent of the lagoon up including part of the inlet stopping at a line running from Picnic Point across to the adjoining shore just south of the American River township.

== Present ==
The Pelican Lagoon Sanctuary Zone lies within Encounter Marine Park and is managed by National Parks South Australia. Pelican Lagoon is probably the oldest marine protected area in South Australia, having been protected since 1914.

== See also ==
- Protected areas of South Australia
