= HMS Sapphire (1874) =

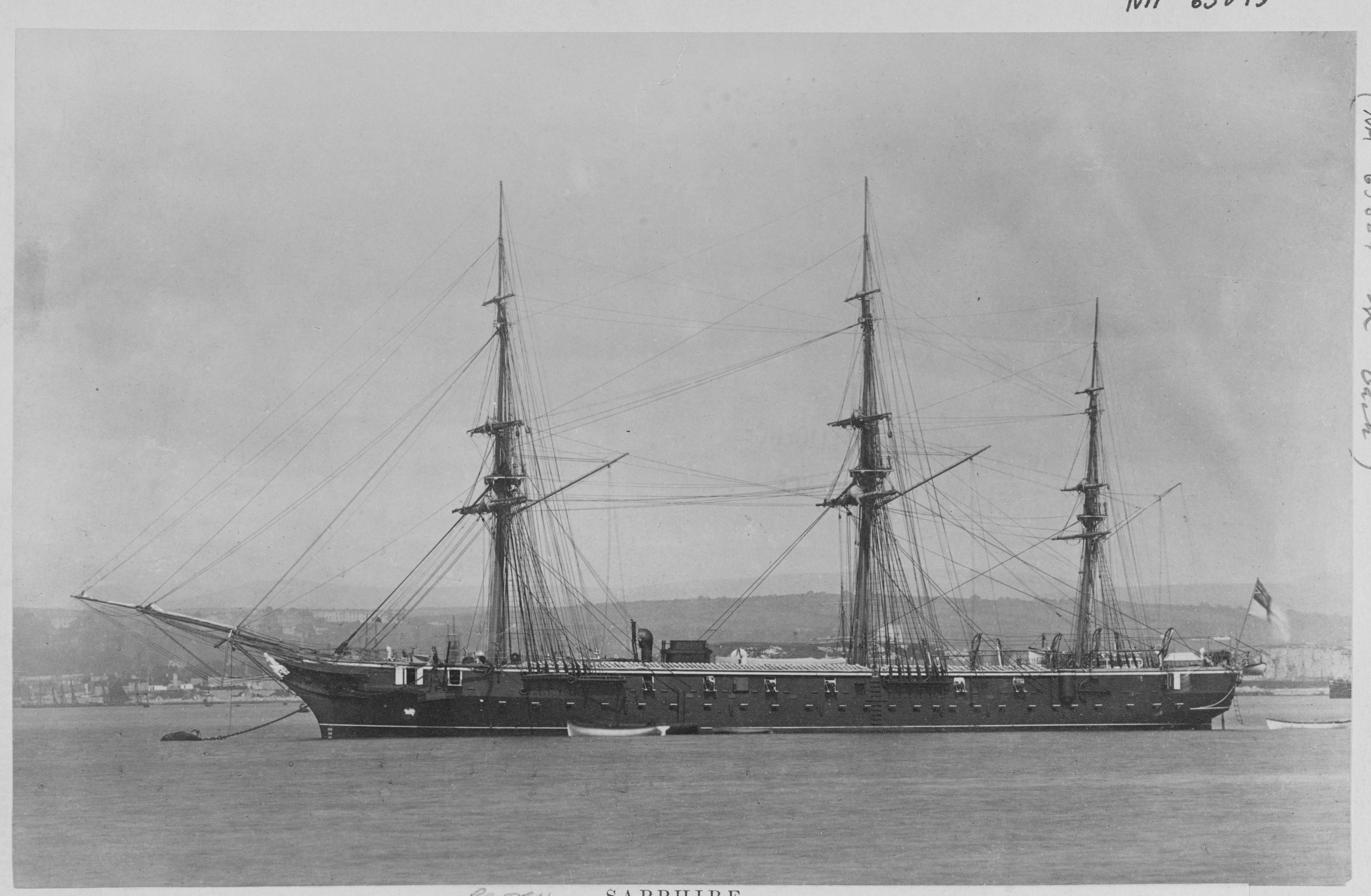
- HMS Sapphire at anchor.

History

United Kingdom
- Name: HMS Sapphire
- Namesake: Sapphire
- Builder: Devonport Dockyard
- Cost: £78,297
- Laid down: 17 June 1873
- Launched: 24 September 1874
- Completed: August 1875
- Fate: Sold for scrap, 24 September 1892

General characteristics (as built)
- Class & type: Amethyst-class wooden screw corvette
- Displacement: 1,934 long tons (1,965 t)
- Tons burthen: 1,405 bm
- Length: 220 ft (67.1 m) (p/p)
- Beam: 37 ft (11.3 m)
- Draught: 18 ft (5.5 m)
- Installed power: 2,364 ihp (1,763 kW)
- Propulsion: 1 shaft; 1 × 2-cylinder compound expansion steam engine; 6 cylindrical boilers
- Sail plan: Ship rig
- Speed: 13 knots (24 km/h; 15 mph)
- Range: approximately 2,500 nmi (4,600 km; 2,900 mi) at 10 knots (19 km/h; 12 mph)
- Complement: 225
- Armament: 12 × 64-pounder 71-cwt rifled muzzle-loading (RML) guns; 2 × 64-pounder 64-cwt RML guns

HMS Sapphire was an Amethyst-class corvette built for the Royal Navy at Devonport Dockyard and launched on 24 September 1874.

She commenced service on the Australia Station in August 1875. She left the Australia Station in July 1879 and returned to England and was refitted and rearmed. After refit she commissioned for the China Station in 1883 until 1890. She returned to Plymouth and was paid off.

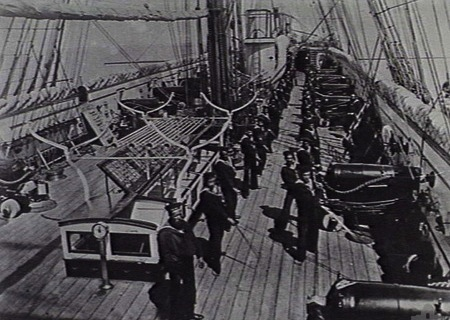
Looking forward from the poop deck, circa. 1878

== Fate ==
She was sold for scrap on 24 September 1892 to G. Cohen.

== See also ==
- Sapphiretown, South Australia

== Bibliography ==
- Ballard, G. A. (1937). "British Corvettes of 1875: The Last Wooden class". Mariner's Mirror. 23 (October). Cambridge, UK: Society for Nautical Research: 435–45.
- Bastock, John (1988), Ships on the Australia Station, Child & Associates Publishing Pty Ltd; Frenchs Forest, Australia. ISBN 0-86777-348-0
- Gardiner, Robert, ed. (1979). Conway's All the World's Fighting Ships 1860–1905. London: Conway Maritime Press. ISBN 0-8317-0302-4.
- Lyon, David & Winfield, Rif (2004). The Sail and Steam Navy List: All the Ships of the Royal Navy 1815–1889. Chatham Publishing. ISBN 978-1-86176-032-6. OCLC 52620555.
