= Ballast Head, South Australia =

Ballast Head
- Town
- Coordinates: 35.760410°S 137.766130°E
- Country: Australia
- State: South Australia
- Region: Fleurieu and Kangaroo Island
- LGA: Kangaroo Island Council
- Location: 118 km (73 mi) south of Adelaide; 19 km (12 mi) southeast of Kingscote
- Established: 2002

Government
  - State electorate: Mawson
  - Federal division: Mayo

Population
  - Total: 21 (SAL 2021)
- Time zone: UTC+9:30 (ACST)
  - Summer (DST): UTC+10:30 (ACST)
- Postcode: 5221
- County: County of Carnarvon
- Mean max temp: 19.1 °C (66.4 °F)
- Mean min temp: 11.6 °C (52.9 °F)
- Annual rainfall: 488.9 mm (19.25 in)
Localities around Ballast Head
Nepean Bay	Nepean Bay	Nepean Bay (water body)
Nepean Bay; Haines,	Ballast Head	Nepean Bay (water body)
Haines	Muston	American River
- Coordinates; Locations; Climate; Adjoining localities

Ballast Head is a locality in the Australian state of South Australia located on the north coast of Kangaroo Island overlooking Nepean Bay about 118 kilometres (73 miles) south of the state capital of Adelaide and about 19 kilometres (12 miles) southeast of the municipal seat of Kingscote.

Its boundaries were created in May 2002 for the “long established name” which is derived from a headland on its coastline. The principal land use within the locality is agriculture.

The locality includes the historic Fish Canning Factory Site and Jacob Seaman's Hut Site Ruins, which are listed on the South Australian Heritage Register.

Ballast Head is located within the federal division of Mayo, the state electoral district of Mawson and the local government area of the Kangaroo Island Council.

== See also ==
- Ballast (disambiguation)
