= Nepean Bay =

Bay in South Australia

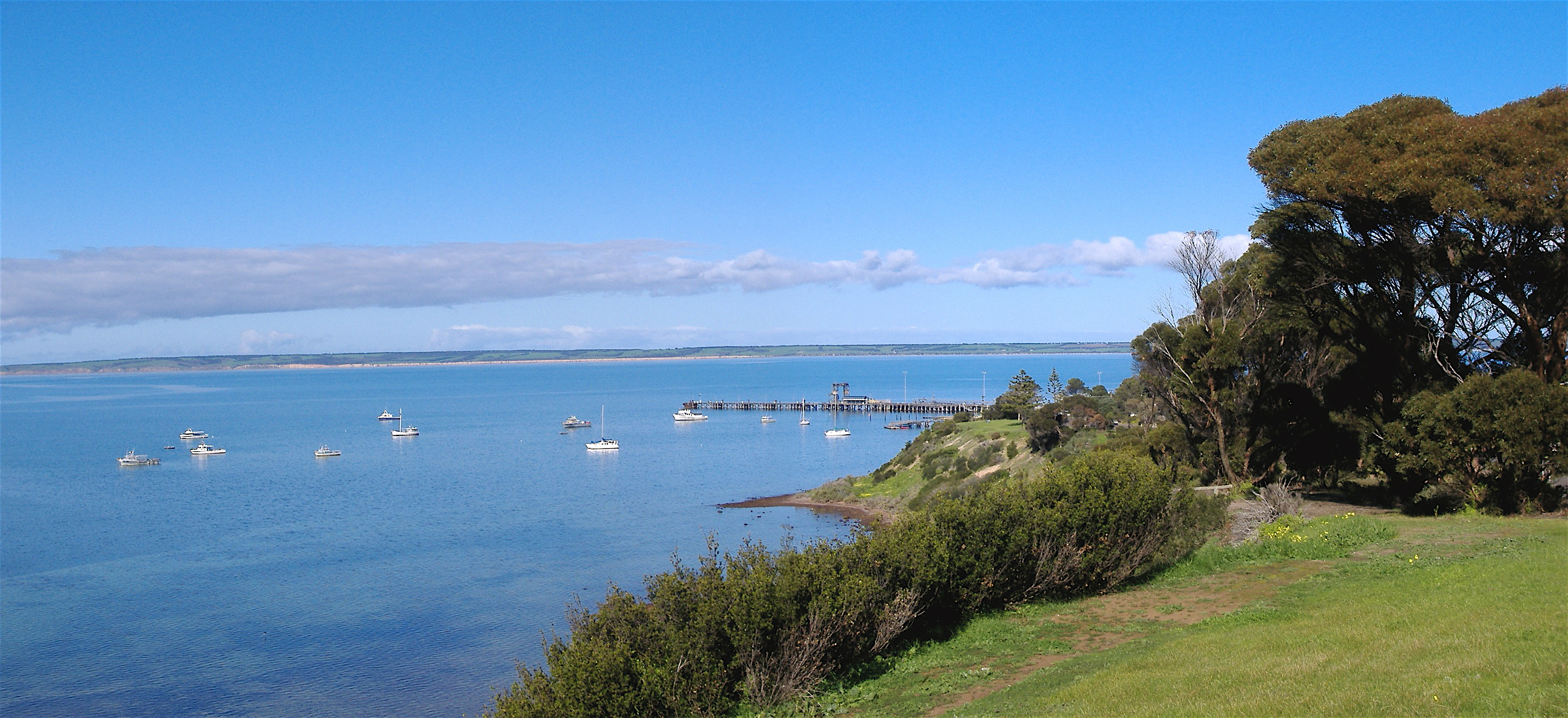

- Location in South Australia
- Location: Kangaroo Island, South Australia
- Coordinates: 35°40′57″S 137°44′43″E
- Type: Bay
- Basin countries: Australia
- Max. length: 30 km (19 mi).
- Max. width: 30 km (19 mi)
- Max. depth: 13.4 m (44 ft)
- Islands: Busby Islet, Beatrice Islets
- Settlements: Kingscote; Cygnet River; Brownlow KI; Nepean Bay; American River; Baudin Beach; Island Beach

Nepean Bay is a bay located on the north-east coast of Kangaroo Island in the Australian state of South Australia about 130 kilometres (81 miles) south-south-west of Adelaide. It was named by the British navigator, Matthew Flinders, after Sir Evan Nepean on 21 March 1802.

== Extent and description ==
Nepean Bay lies between Point Marsden and Kangaroo Head on the north-east coast of Kangaroo Island facing into Investigator Strait. Nepean Bay itself includes the following coastal inlets from west to east - Bay of Shoals, Western Cove, and Eastern Cove. Eastern Cove itself includes an inlet consisting of a channel known as American River and a lagoon system known as Pelican Lagoon.

=== Bay of Shoals ===
The Bay of Shoals is a body of water which is located immediately north of the settlement of Kingscote and whose mouth is located between Cape Rouge in the north and Beatrice Point in the south over a distance of about 5 kilometres (3.1 mi). The bay has a maximum charted depth of 2.7 metres (8 ft 10 in). Its mouth is bounded by a spit known as 'The Spit' which extends from Cape Rouge to within 0.5 nautical miles (0.93 km; 0.58 mi) of Beatrice Point, includes the islets of Busby and Beatrice and is reported as being exposed during local tides, i.e. ‘drying.’ Access for watercraft into the bay is via a natural channel at its southern end near Beatrice Point.

=== Kingscote Harbour ===
Kingscote Harbour is the sheltered water between Bay of Shoals and Western Cove. The harbour is sheltered by the Beatrice Islets, and it faces the northern part of the town of Kingscote.

=== Western Cove ===
Western Cove is a body of water whose mouth is located between Beare Point in the west and Morrison Point in the east separated by a distance of about 8 nautical miles (15 km; 9.2 mi). The cove has a maximum depth of about 10 metres (33 ft) at its mouth. Its shoreline is described as (distances in nautical miles):

The S(outh) shore, between Morrison Point and a red cliffy point about 3 miles W, is high and rocky. A range of wooded hills along the S(outh) shore falls gradually to the W(est). Red cliffs extend about 1.5 miles W(est) from the red cliffy point, and from there to the head of the cove is a continuous sandy beach. The land at the head of the cove is low and swampy and continues so to Beare Point…

=== Eastern Cove ===
Eastern Cove is the body of water whose mouth is located between Morrison Point in the west and Kangaroo Head in the east separated by a distance of about 6 nautical miles (11 km; 6.9 mi). The cove has a maximum depth of 14 metres (46 ft) at its mouth. Its shoreline is described as (distances in nautical miles):

The shore of Eastern Cove, between Kangaroo Head and American Beach, 2.5 miles S(outh), is rugged and rocky. Between the SW end of American Beach and Rocky Point, it consists of alternate beaches and low, rocky points. A sandy beach forms the S(outh) shore between Rocky Point and Strawbridge Point, 2.75 miles WNW. The S(outh) side of the cove is low with wooded hills at the back.

Eastern Cove includes Ballast Head Harbor on the western side near Ballast Head.

== European discovery ==
Matthew Flinders named Nepean Bay after Sir Evan Nepean, First Secretary to the Admiralty, on 21 March 1802.

== Ports and other settlements ==
Settlements on its shores include Kingscote, Brownlow KI and Nepean Bay on the shores of Western Cove, and American River, Baudin Beach and Island Beach on the shores of Eastern Cove.

== Protected areas ==
Protected areas located within and adjoining the bay’s extent include:

- Aquatic reserves - American River.
- Conservation parks - Beatrice Islet, Busby Islet, Cygnet Estuary, Nepean Bay and Pelican Lagoon.
- Marine parks - Encounter Marine Park

== See also ==
- Nepean (disambiguation)
