= Kangaroo Island Council =

Coordinates: 35.65°S 137.633°E

- Local government area
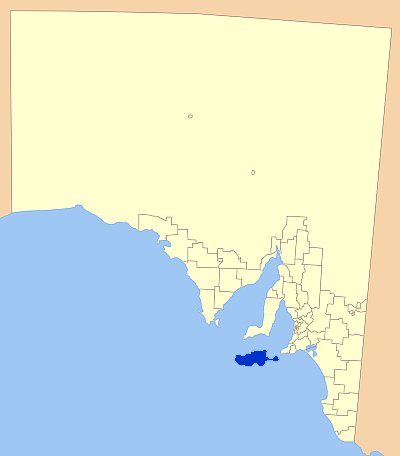
- Location of Kangaroo Island Council

- Interactive map of Kangaroo Island Council
- Country: Australia
- State: South Australia
- Region: Fleurieu and Kangaroo Island
- Established: 1996
- Council seat: Kingscote

Government
  - Mayor: Michael Pengilly
  - State electorate: Mawson
  - Federal division: Mayo

Area
  - Total: 4,400.1 km^{2} (1,698.9 sq mi)

Population
  - Total: 4,894 (LGA 2021)
  - Density: 1.11/km^{2} (2.9/sq mi)
- Website: Kangaroo Island Council
LGAs around Kangaroo Island Council
	Investigator Strait	District Council of Yankalilla
Southern Ocean	Kangaroo Island Council
Southern Ocean	Southern Ocean	Southern Ocean

The Kangaroo Island Council is a local government area in South Australia that covers the entirety of Kangaroo Island, 13 km off the coast of the mainland. The council was formed on the 28 November 1996 by the amalgamation of the District Council of Kingscote and the District Council of Dudley. Its first meeting held on 11 December 1996.

The seat of the council is located in the island's largest town, Kingscote. The district's population at the 2021 census was 4894.

== Elected members ==
Mayor: Michael Pengilly CEO: Daryl Buckingham

Councillors:

- Bob Teasdale
- Ken Liu
- Greg Miller
- Sam Mumford
- Shirley Pledge
- Veronica Bates
- Richard Cotterill
- Pat Austin

== Economy ==
The district's largest industry is agriculture, forestry, and fishing. Tourism is also a contributor to the economy, with tourists coming to the island for its natural environment.

== Localities ==
Localities within the jurisdiction of the Kangaroo Island Council are as follows: American Beach, American River, Antechamber Bay, Ballast Head, Baudin Beach, Bay of Shoals, Birchmore, Brown Beach, Brownlow KI, Cape Borda, Cassini, Cuttlefish Bay, Cygnet River, De Mole River, D'Estrees Bay, Dudley East, Dudley West, Duncan, Emu Bay, Flinders Chase, Gosse, Haines, Island Beach, Ironstone, Kangaroo Head, Karrata, Kingscote, Kohinoor, MacGillivray, Menzies, Middle River, Muston, Nepean Bay, Newland, North Cape, Parndana, Pelican Lagoon, Penneshaw, Porky Flat, Sapphiretown, Seal Bay, Seddon, Stokes Bay, Stun'Sail Boom, Vivonne Bay, Western River, Willoughby, Willson River, and Wisanger.

== See also ==
- List of parks and gardens in rural South Australia
- Kangaroo Island (disambiguation)
