= American River, South Australia =

American River
- Town
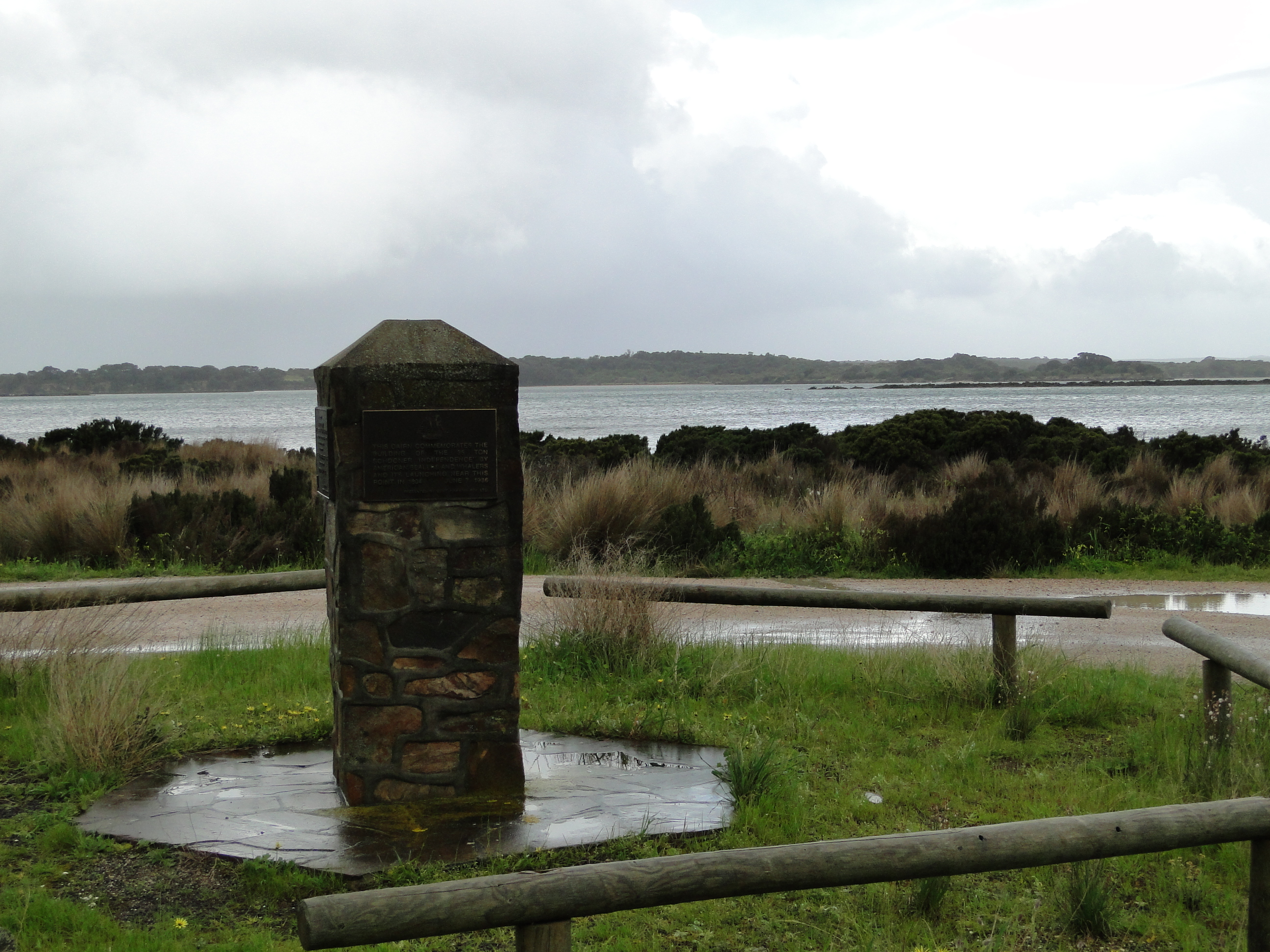
- Sealers memorial at American River

- Coordinates: 35°46′42″S 137°46′22″E
- Country: Australia
- State: South Australia
- Region: Fleurieu and Kangaroo Island
- LGA: Kangaroo Island Council
- Location: 120 km (75 mi) south of Adelaide city centre; 19 km (12 mi) south-east of Kingscote
- Established: 1842

Government
  - State electorate: Mawson
  - Federal division: Mayo

Population
  - Total: 280 (2021 census)
- Postcode: 5221
- County: County of Carnarvon
- Mean max temp: 19.1 °C (66.4 °F)
- Mean min temp: 11.6 °C (52.9 °F)
- Annual rainfall: 488.9 mm (19.25 in)
Localities around American River
Ballast Head	Ballast Head	Ballast Head
Ballast Head; Muston	American River	Nepean Bay
Muston	American River	American River
- Locations; Climate; Adjoining localities

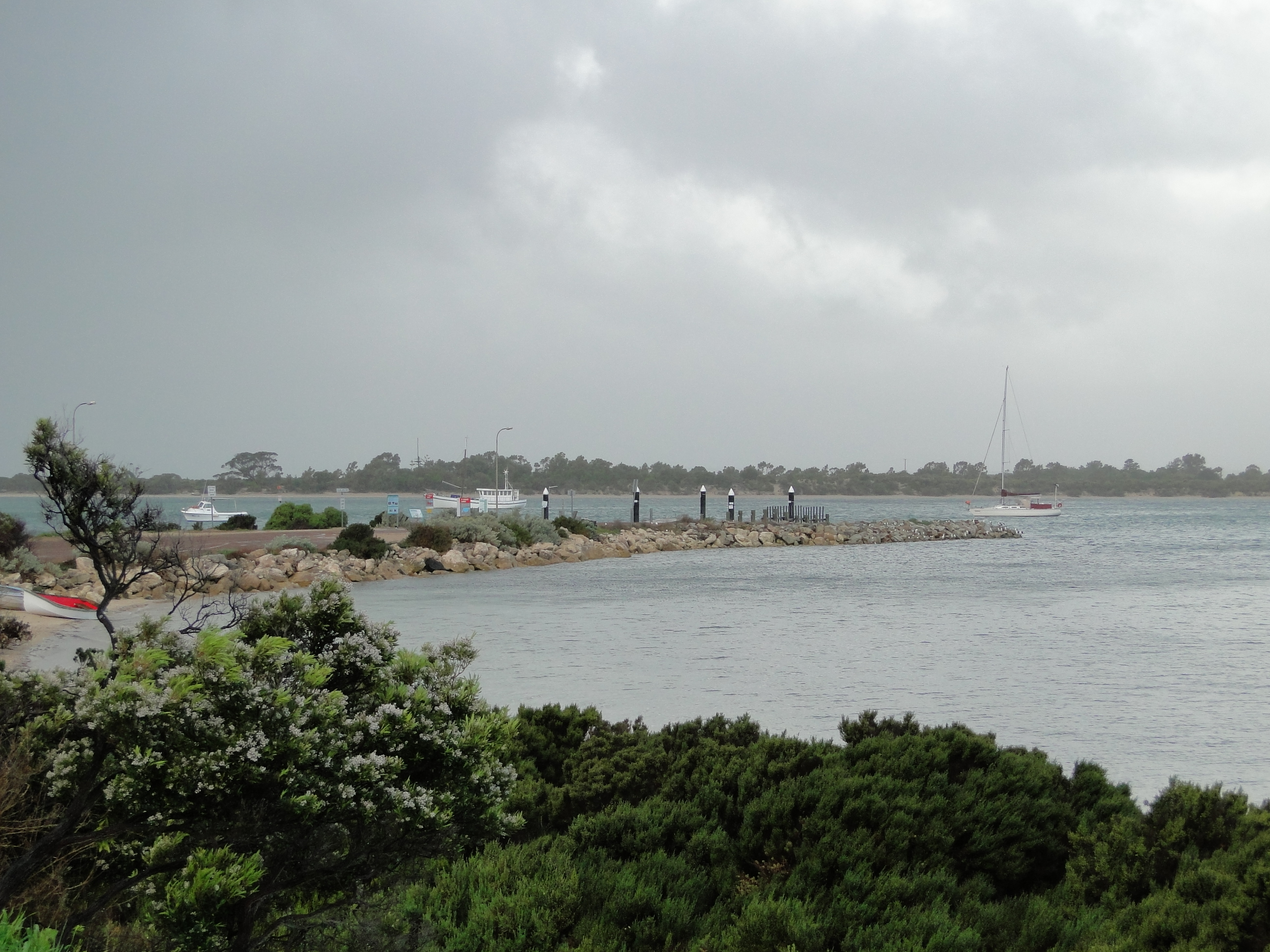
Boats at American River

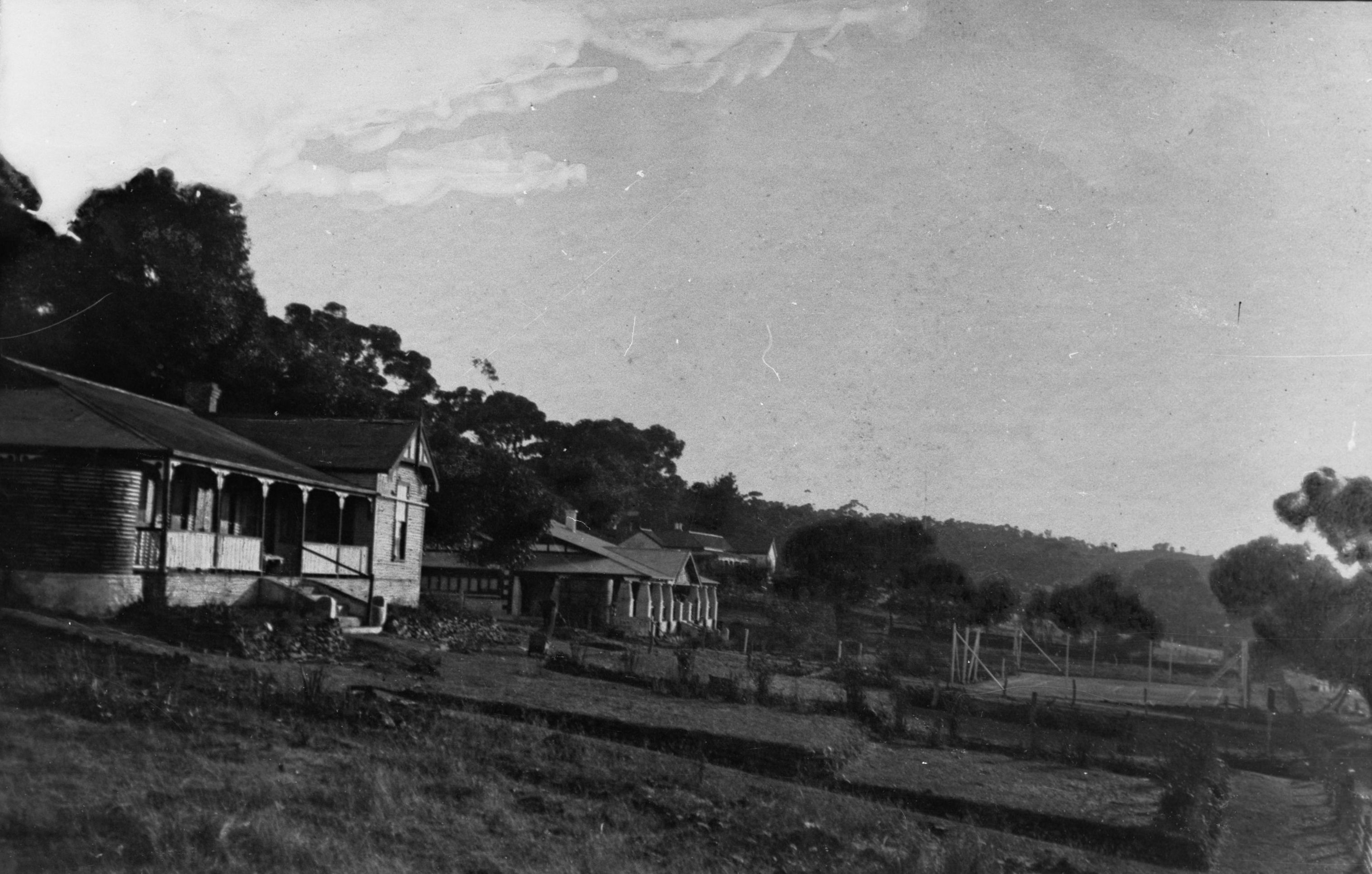
Guest Homes at American River

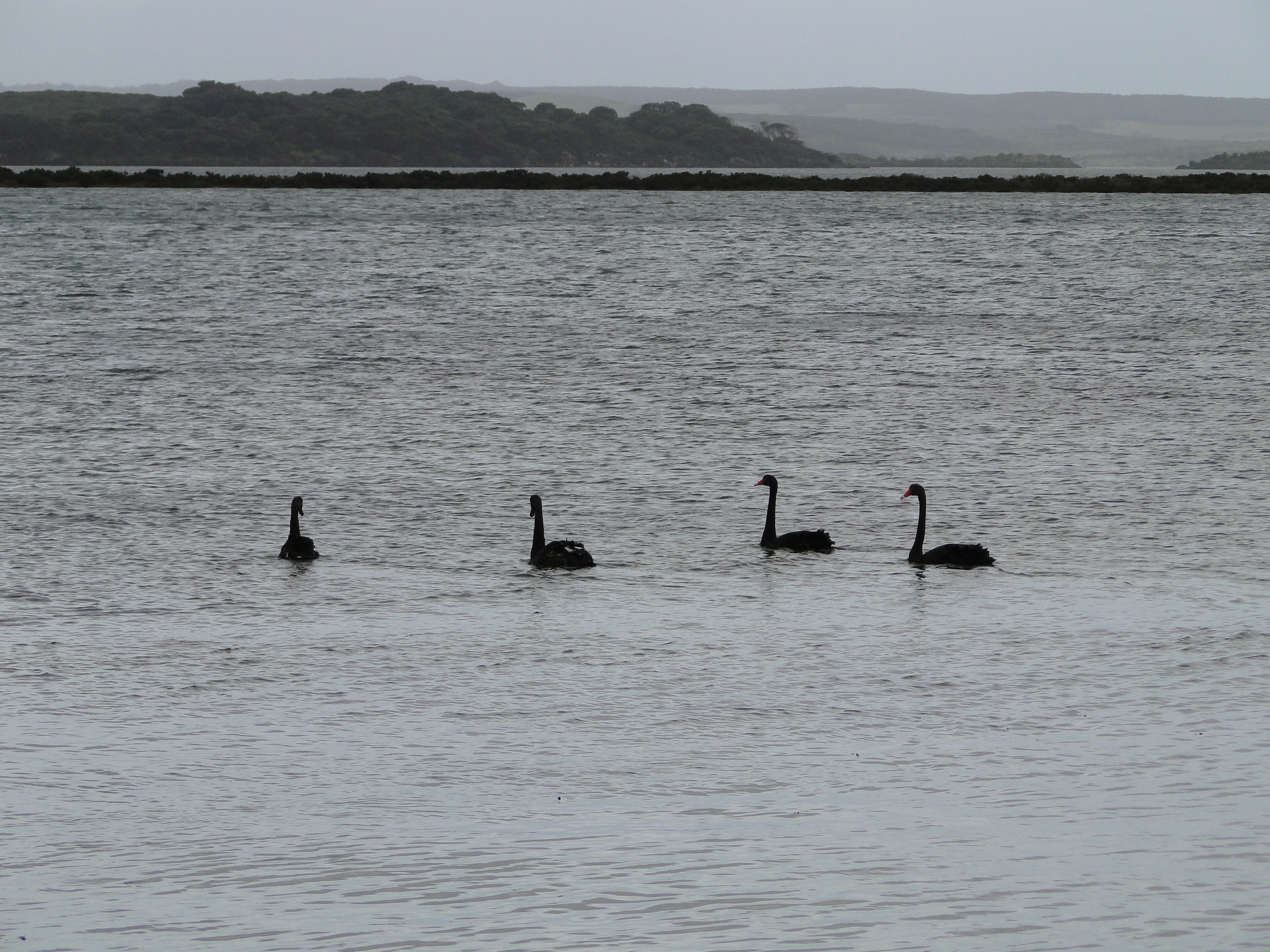
Swans at American River

American River is a town in the Australian state of South Australia located on the western shore of Eastern Cove on Kangaroo Island.

== History ==
The area now known as American River was first visited by Europeans in 1802 when Matthew Flinders landed to survey this part of Kangaroo Island. In 1803, a group of American sealers camped for four months in the area. They arrived on the brig Union and built their own 35 ton schooner Independence from local timber. The town takes its name from this time. A memorial plaque and accompanying anchor (recovered in 1969) from an early American whaling vessel is dedicated to Union's crew.

Frank Potts was the first official settler in 1842, before moving to the mainland and establishing the Bleasdale vineyard and winery at Langhorne Creek. John Buick, a professional boat builder, built the first house in the town in 1844. It was fashioned out of local stone, pug and sput timber and remained standing until 1985.

A fish canning factory existed for a few years from the late 1890s, remnants of which may still be found on the shore north of the town proper. Gypsum was mined at Flour Cask Bay, later at Pelican Lagoon and trucked to nearby Ballast Head, from 1956 until 1986.

Until the 1980s, the town was serviced regularly by the ketches Falie, Nelcebee (last service 15 April 1982) and Ulonga, operated by R. Fricker & Co. Consequently, for some time after the cessation of this service, the wharf area for some time was a redundant commercial facility; this resulted in the removal of several buildings and fuel facilities.

== Tourism ==
The town looks out over Pelican Lagoon, which is a popular place for birdwatching, kayaking and boating, though fishing within the lagoon is prohibited.

=== Ryberg House ===
Nils Ryberg, a Swedish born immigrant, settled at American River in 1884, and ten years later built the original "Ryberg House" on the site of the present Kangaroo Island Lodge, exclusively for tourist accommodation.

Ryberg added to his lodge over several years, before selling to John and Valerie Linnett in 1913. Ryberg House was completely rebuilt in 1928, and remains today. Fishing trips were an integral part of the business, with three boats, Warrigal, Linnette and Linnette 2 comprising the fleet which operated until 1985.

The business was operated until John Linnett's death in 1955, after which time his four sons, Keith, Lionel, Leon and Gordon continued under the name of Linnetts Pleasure Resort. Leon Linnett assumed sole proprietorship in 1971, expanding the resort with the erection of several new wings and refurbishing the reception, administration and restaurant areas in 1980, when the resort became known as Linnetts Island Club. Leon Linnett sold the property in the late 1990s to an Adelaide-based consortium that trades under the name Kangaroo Island Lodge.

== Facilities ==
The town supports a Country Fire Service brigade and South Australian Ambulance Service depot. An active sports and community association maintains a focal point for weekly meals and community awareness, whilst an annual fishing competition, normally held at Easter, is popular. There is a small store and post office, providing most postal services (limited banking) on Buick Drive. There is also a small cafe and gift shop located at the wharf which is open from 10.00am to 3.00pm daily.

An extensive wharf with mooring facilities for large commercial fishing boats was completed in 1964. A new, triple berth boat ramp with floating pontoons was completed in July 2008.

In recent years, several new land subdivisions have seen increased development within the township, highlighting the need for improved effluent disposal and water supply. A Community Wastewater Management Scheme was implemented in 2009.

== Transport ==
Air services were operated for a number of years by Emu Airways, utilising a privately owned airstrip located to the north of the township. Air Transport regulations subsequently rendered the airstrip unsuitable for commercial flights. An accommodation venue at nearby Muston publicises access via an alternative, private air strip.

== See also ==
- Pelican Lagoon
