= Nepean =

Nepean may refer to:

== Electorates ==
- Division of Nepean, former federal electorate in New South Wales
- Electoral district of Nepean, state electoral district in Victoria, Australia
- Electoral district of Nepean (New South Wales), former state electoral district in New South Wales
- Nepean (federal electoral district), a Canadian electoral district covering Nepean and other parts of western Ottawa
  - Nepean—Carleton (federal electoral district), former Canadian electoral district (1979 to 1988, 1997 to 2015)
  - Nepean—Carleton (provincial electoral district), former Canadian electoral district (1999 to 2014)

== Organisations and institutions ==
- Nepean College of Advanced Education, a former higher education institution in Western Sydney, Australia
- Nepean Creative and Performing Arts High School, Sydney, Australia
- Nepean Hospital, Kingswood, New South Wales, Australia
- Nepean Observatory, an observatory, part of Western Sydney University at Werrington North, New South Wales
- UWS Nepean, a former campus of Western Sydney University

== People ==
- Nepean (surname), several people with the surname
- Nepean baronets, a baronetcy created in Dorset, England, UK

== Places ==
=== Australia ===
- Nepean Bay, a bay in South Australia
  - Nepean Bay Conservation Park, a protected area in South Australia,
  - Nepean Bay, South Australia, a locality
- Nepean Highway, Victoria
- Nepean Island (Norfolk Island)
- Nepean Island, Queensland
- Nepean River, NSW
- Point Nepean, Victoria

=== Canada ===
Ontario

- Kìwekì Point, a hill overlooking the Ottawa River in Ottawa, Ontario, formerly known as Nepean Point
- Nepean, Ontario
- Nepean Bay (Canada), on the Ottawa River, Ontario
- Nepean Township, Ontario

British Columbia

- Nepean Sound, British Columbia

== See also ==
- Hawkesbury and Nepean Wars (1794–1816), a series of conflicts between British forces and Indigenous clans in the area west of Sydney
- Nepean Sea Road, Mumbai, India
- Nepean Stars F.C., a football club in Sierra Leone
