= Nepean (surname) =

Nepean is a surname. Notable people with the surname include:

- Augustus Nepean (1849–1933), Middlesex county cricketer
- Charles Nepean (1851–1903), Middlesex county cricketer and Oxford University footballer
- Evan Nepean (1751–1822), British politician and colonial administrator
- Evan Nepean (cricketer) (1865–1906), Middlesex county cricketer
- Mary Edith Nepean (1876–1960), Welsh writer
- Molyneux Hyde Nepean (1783–1856), Middlesex county cricketer and son of Evan Nepean
