= Statue of Egerton Ryerson =

Statue in Toronto, Canada

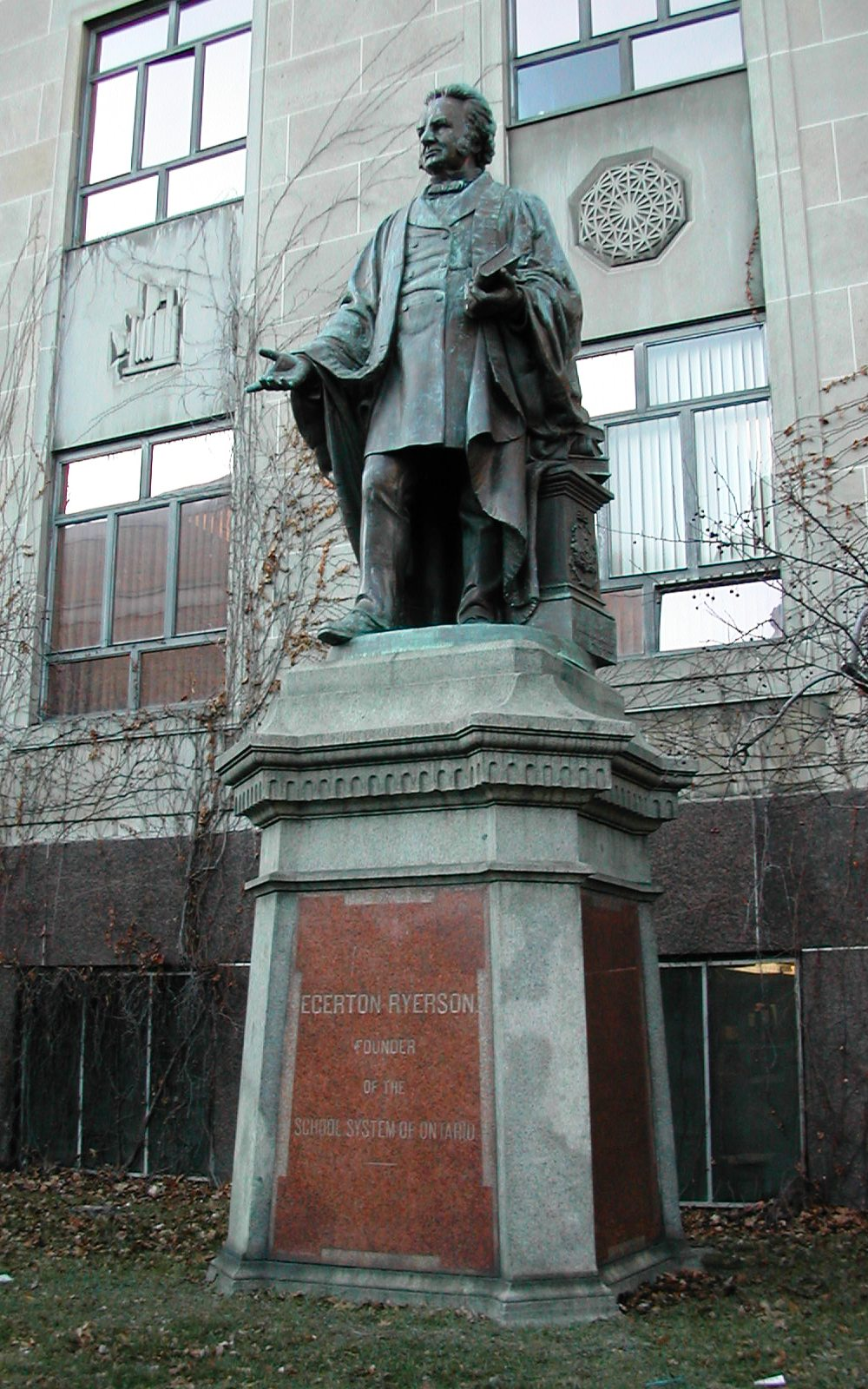
- The statue in 2005
- Artist: Hamilton MacCarthy
- Year: 1887
- Subject: Egerton Ryerson
- Condition: Destroyed in 2021
- Location: Toronto, Canada

A statue of Egerton Ryerson by Hamilton MacCarthy was installed on the grounds of Ryerson University in Toronto, now known as Toronto Metropolitan University, from 1887 until 2021.

== History ==
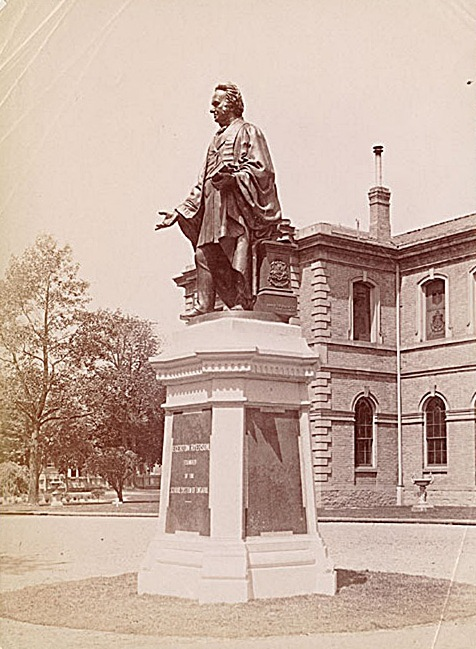
The statue in 1890, as photographed by Josiah Bruce

The novelist Graeme Gibson draped the flag of the United States around the statue in a 1970 protest against the sale of Ryerson Press to the American publishers McGraw Hill Education for $2 million (equivalent to $16,580,977 in 2025). Gibson led protesters in a rendition of "I'm a Yankee Doodle Dandy" after climbing down from the statue.

The statue attracted significant criticism in the 2010s due to Ryerson's role in the creation of the Canadian Indian residential school system. In 2018, a plaque was officially installed on the statue that contextualizes and acknowledged Ryerson's involvement in the history of the Canadian Indian residential school system. The plaque contains the following text:

This plaque serves as a reminder of Ryerson University's commitment to moving forward in the spirit of truth and reconciliation. Egerton Ryerson is widely known for his contributions to Ontario's public educational system. As Chief Superintendent of Education, Ryerson's recommendations were instrumental in the design and implementation of the Indian Residential School System. In 2015, the Truth and Reconciliation Commission of Canada concluded that the assimilation amounted to cultural genocide.

Beneath this text are the following two quotations:

"Let us put our minds together to see what kind of lives we can create for our children" – Chief Sitting Bull

"For the child taken, for the parent left behind" – Truth and Reconciliation Commission of Canada

In July 2020, three people were arrested for splattering pink paint on the statue – in addition to two others of John A. Macdonald and King Edward VII at the Ontario Legislature – as part of a demand to tear down the monuments. Black Lives Matter Toronto claimed responsibility for the actions stating that "The action comes after the City of Toronto and the Province of Ontario have failed to take action against police violence against Black people." Three people were each charged with three counts of mischief under $5,000 and conspiracy to commit a summary offence; the charges were dropped the following year.

On June 1, 2021, following the discovery of 215 soil disturbances at the Kamloops Indian Residential School, the statue was vandalized again, this time with red paint. On June 6, the statue was toppled, decapitated and thrown into Toronto Harbour; what was then Ryerson University stated that the statue will not be restored or replaced. The head of the statue was subsequently placed on a pike at the Six Nations of the Grand River near Caledonia, Ontario.

== See also ==
- Canadian Indian residential school gravesites
