= Baker Baronets of Ranston (1802) =

The Baker baronetcy of Ranston, Dorset, was created in the Baronetage of the United Kingdom on 2 September 1802.

Escutcheon of the Baker Baronets of Ranston

== Baker of Ranston, Dorset (1802) ==
- Lieutenant-colonel Sir Edward Baker (né Baker Littlehales), 1st Baronet (died 1825), married Elizabeth-Mary Fitzgerald, third daughter of William FitzGerald, 2nd Duke of Leinster
- Sir Edward Baker, 2nd Baronet (1806–1877)
- Sir Talbot Hastings Bendall Baker, 3rd Baronet (1820–1900), canon of Salisbury Cathedral
- Sir Randolf Littlehales Baker, 4th Baronet (20 July 1879 – 23 July 1959). Extinct on his death.

== Notes ==
Baronetage of the United Kingdom
Preceded by Nepean baronets	Baker baronets of Ranston; 2 September 1802	Succeeded by Dickson baronets
