= Hamilton MacCarthy =

Canadian sculptor (1846–1939)

Hamilton P. MacCarthy
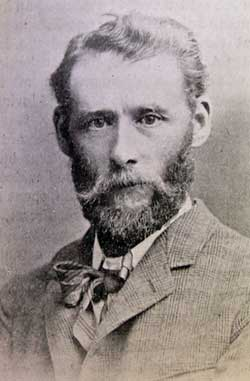
- Hamilton P. MacCarthy
- Born: 28 July 1846; London, England
- Died: 24 October 1939 (aged 93); Ottawa, Ontario, Canada
- Known for: sculptor, educator

Hamilton Thomas Carlton Plantagenet MacCarthy RCA (28 July 1846 – 24 October 1939) was one of the earliest masters of monumental bronze sculpture in Canada. He is known for his historical sculptures, in particular his Pierre Dugua, Sieur de Mons at Annapolis Royal, Nova Scotia (1904) as well as Samuel de Champlain overlooking Parliament Hill on Nepean Point, Ottawa (1915), next to the National Gallery of Canada. His monument to the Ottawa volunteers who died in the South African War (1902) was moved to Confederation Park in 1969 after several moves. Other works include that of Ottawa mayor, Samuel Bingham, in Notre-Dame Cemetery in Vanier.

== Life ==
MacCarthy's father Hamilton Wright MacCarthy exhibited independent works at the Royal Academy and the British Institution in 1838 and between 1846 and 1867. They included a number of portrait busts (10-12). He contributed to the Great Exhibition a group of a deer hunt, consisting of a Scottish huntsman about to blow his horn, with a felled stag and two dogs 'executed in silver for ornamental purposes'. It was praised as 'a spirited performance, well composed' and was considered 'a credit to the designer'.

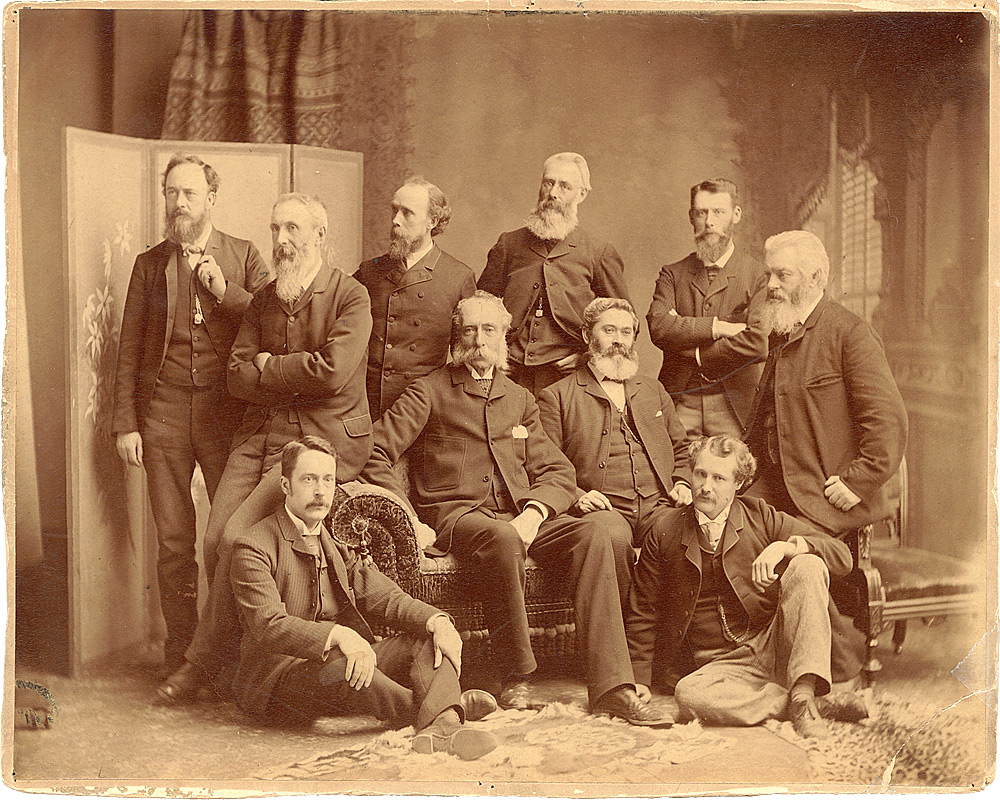
Ontario Society of Artists Members (1889) - MacCarthy (back row, second from right)

His wife exhibited a statuette of a famous racehorse, 'Pyrrhus The First', at the BI in 1857. Their son, Hamilton P MacCarthy, was also a sculptor and he exhibited portraiture and ideal works at the Royal Academy between 1875 and 1884.

In London, MacCarthy studied with his father, and in Antwerp under Kerckhoven and at the RA Schools in London. He also attended St Marylebone School. At age 39, MacCarthy moved from London, England to Toronto, Ontario, Canada in 1885. Thirteen years later he moved to Ottawa. He studied at Royal Canadian Academy of Arts (R.C.A.) and, later, was made a member of Council (1906). He was also a member of the Ontario Society of Artists (O.S.A.). His work appears in galleries and public parks throughout Canada.

MacCarthy had 15 children. The first three were born in England, the others in Canada. One of his sons Coeur de Lion MacCarthy (1881–1979) also became a sculptor.

Coeur de Lion executed many busts of political figures including the bust of Queen Victoria for the alcove above the Speaker's Chair in the Senate Chamber. He worked with Dominion carver Cléophas Soucy on the figures for the Parliament Buildings including the lions at the entrance. MacCarthy set up a studio in Montreal in 1918. He is well known for his sympathetic memorials for the CPR and the Verdun War Memorial.

== Works ==
Samuel de Champlain The Hamilton MacCarthy sculpture of Samuel de Champlain in Ottawa became controversial later in the 20th century. Originally it included an Anishinaabe Scout kneeling on its base. In the 1990s after lobbying by Indigenous people, the scout was removed from the sculpture's platform, renamed, and relocated as a statue in its own right to Major's Hill Park.

Experts have also noted that the statue depicts Champlain holding an astrolabe, but holding it upside-down.

=== Ottawa ===
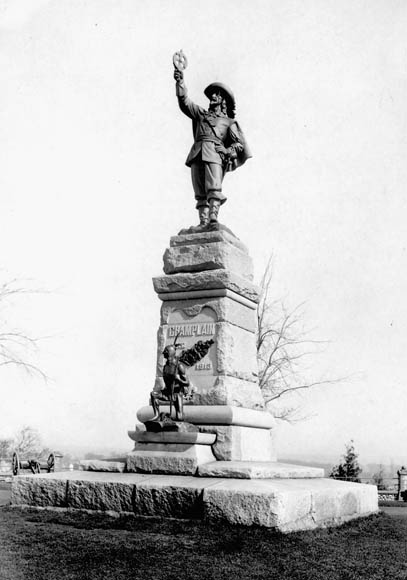
Samuel de Champlain, Nepean Point, Ottawa

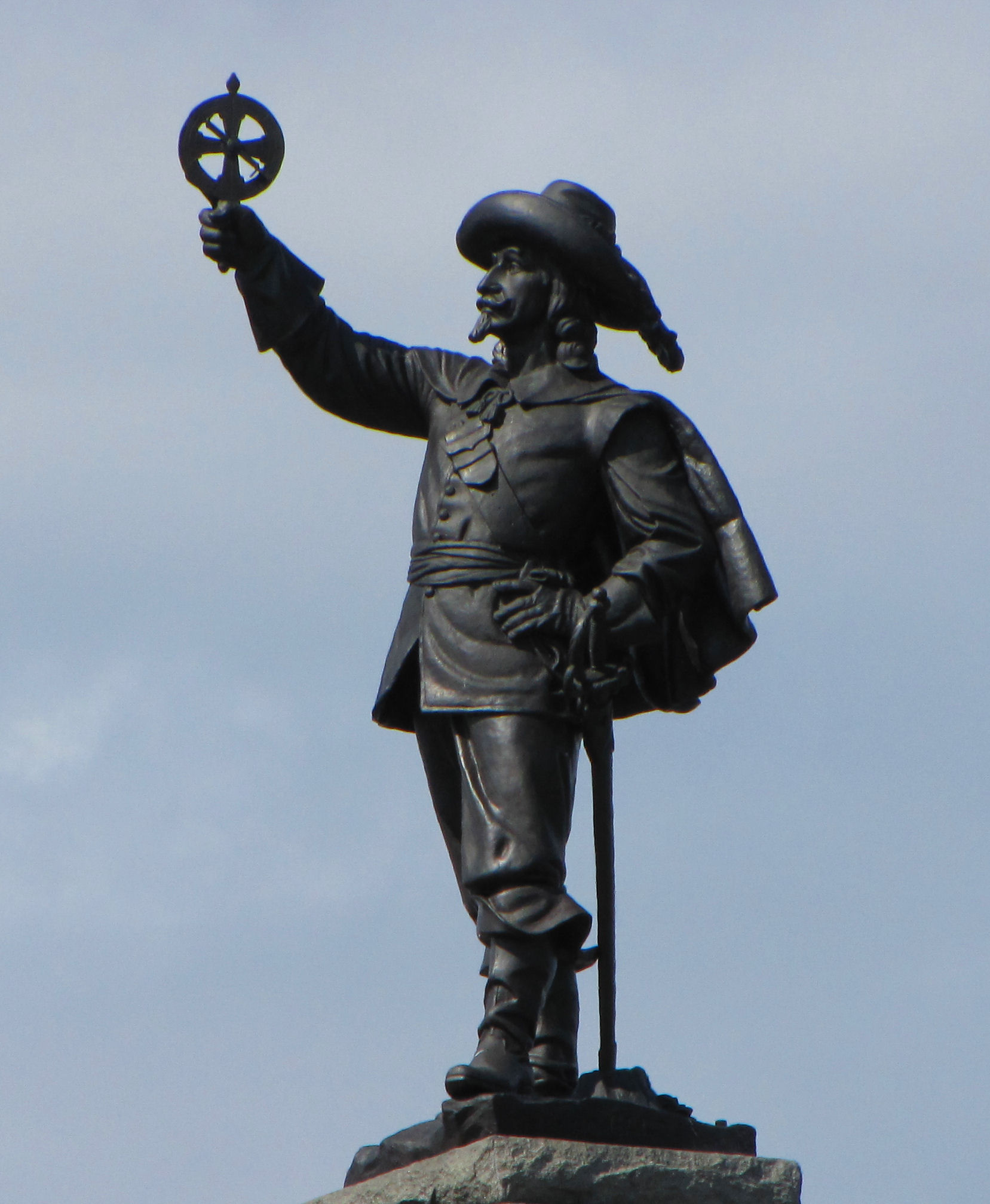
Samuel de Champlain, Nepean Point, Ottawa

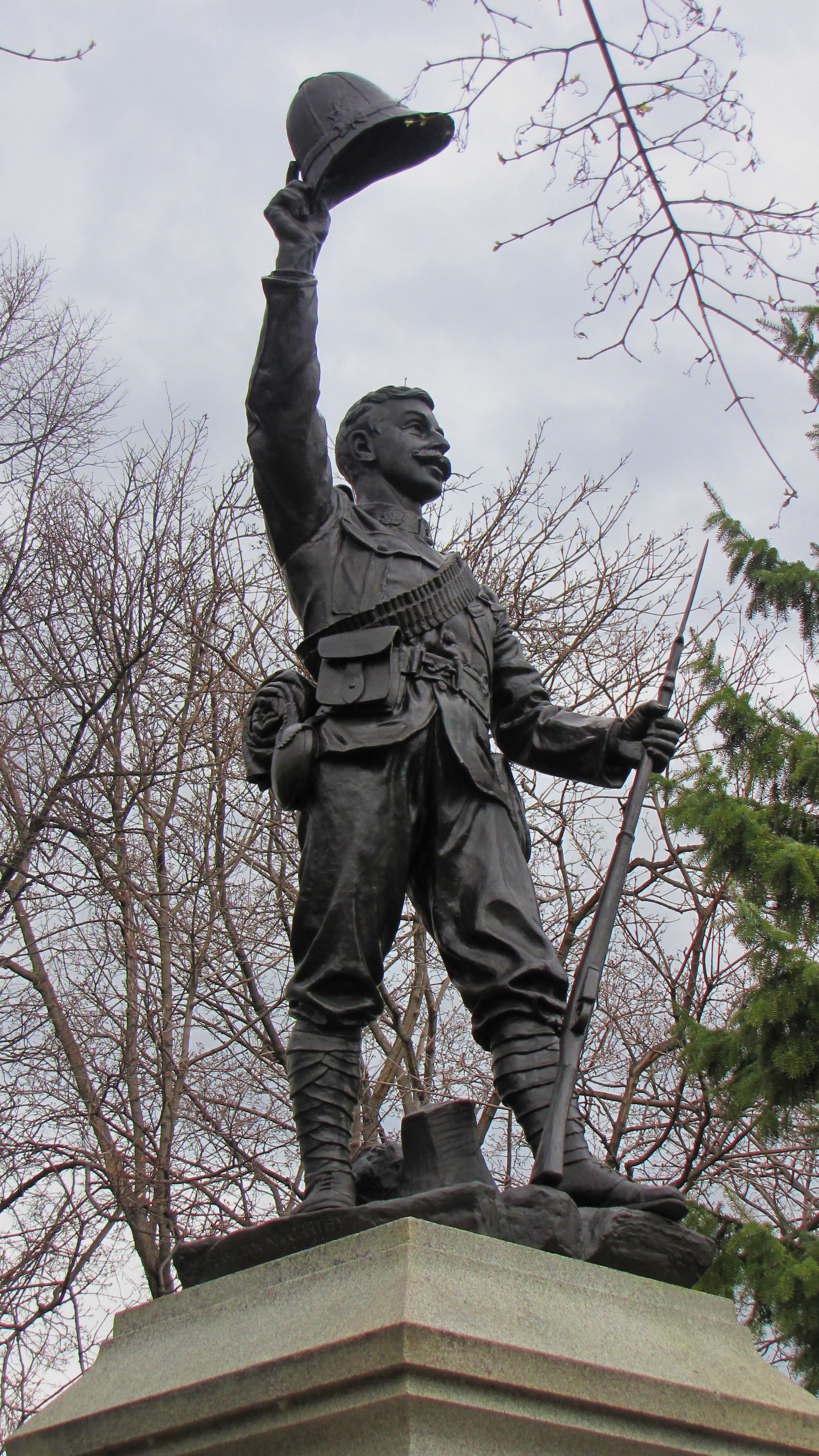
Boer War Monument, Ottawa (1902)

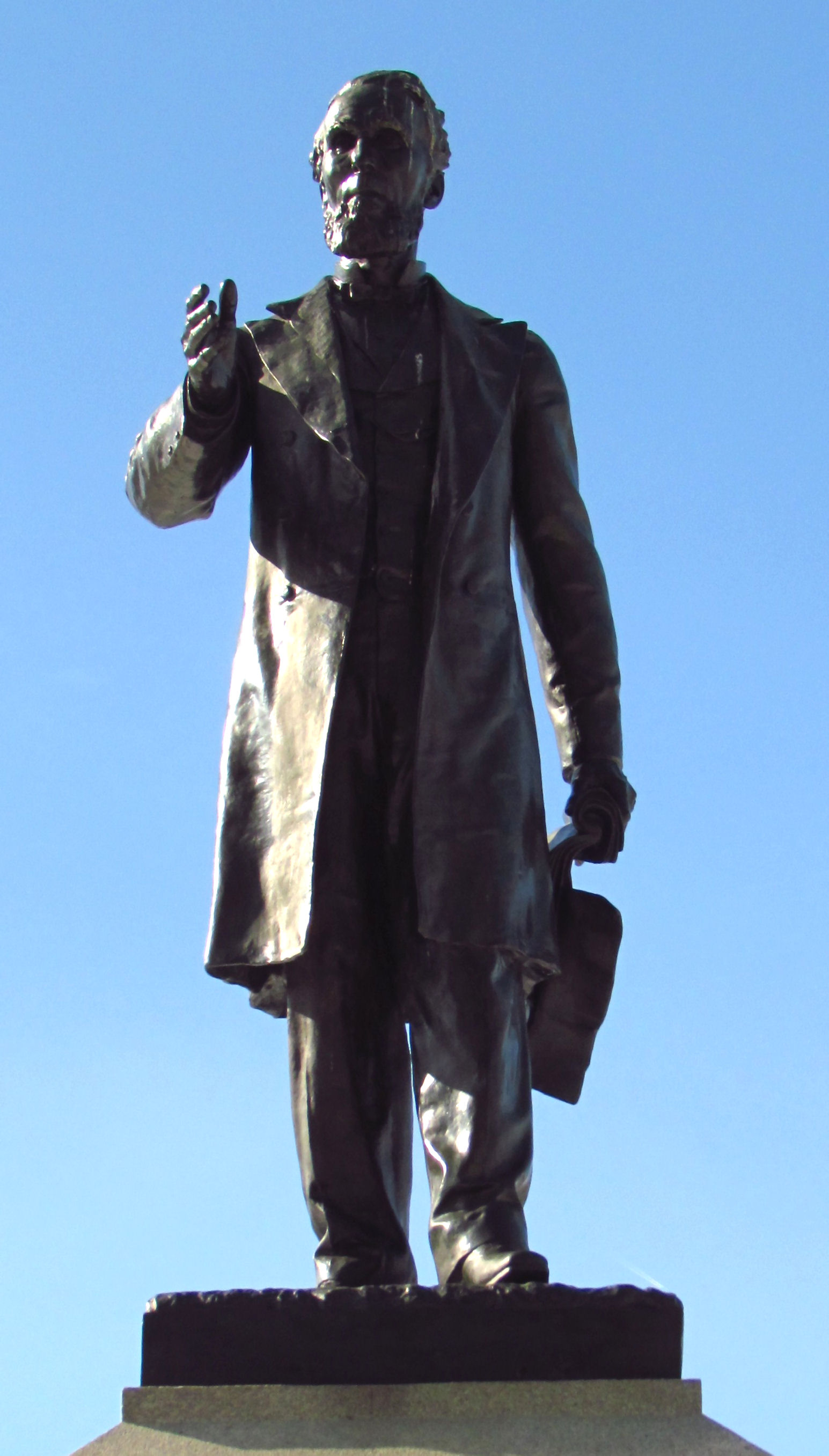
Alexander Mackenzie, Parliament Hill, Ottawa

=== Nova Scotia ===
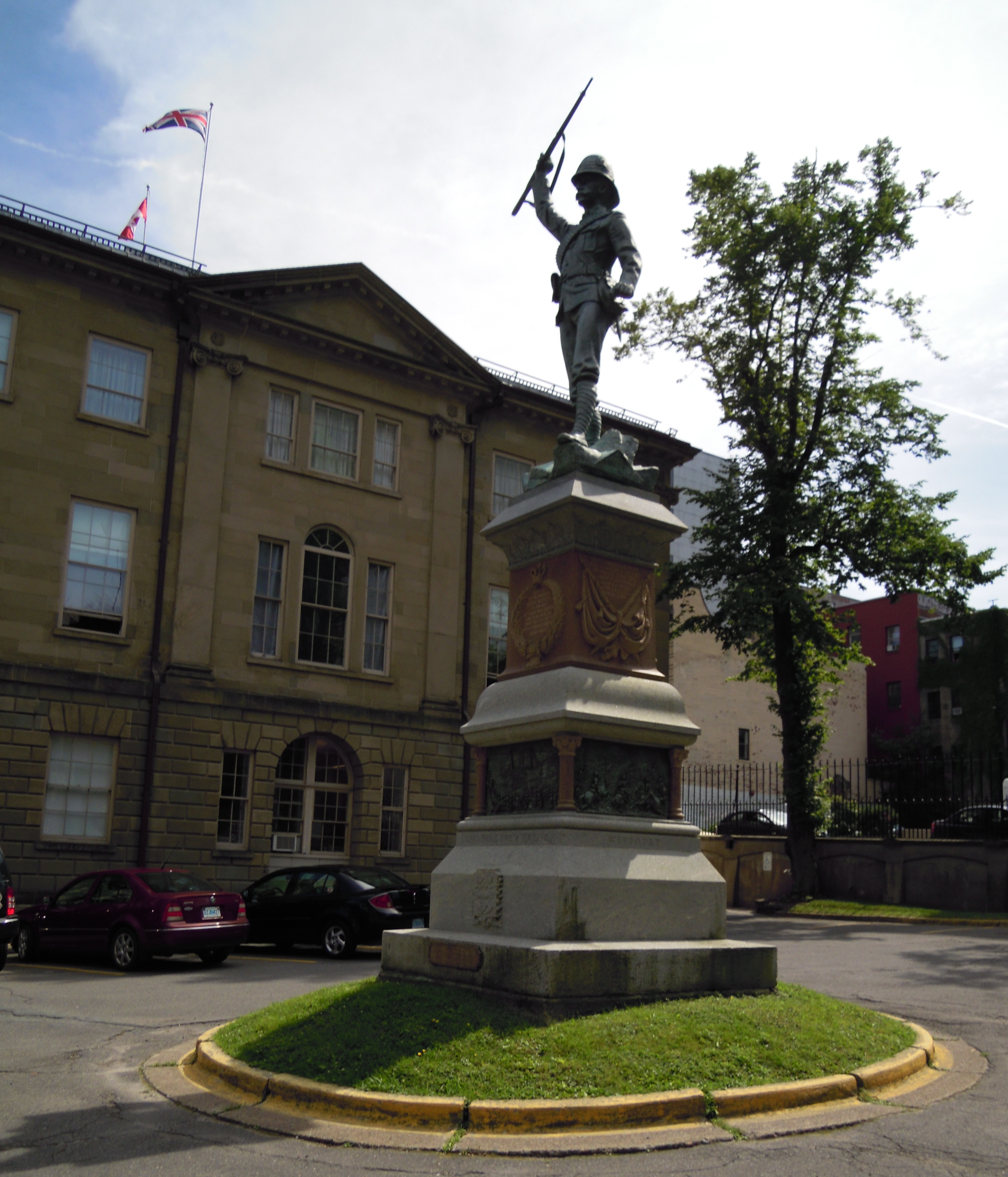
South African War Memorial, Province House, Nova Scotia

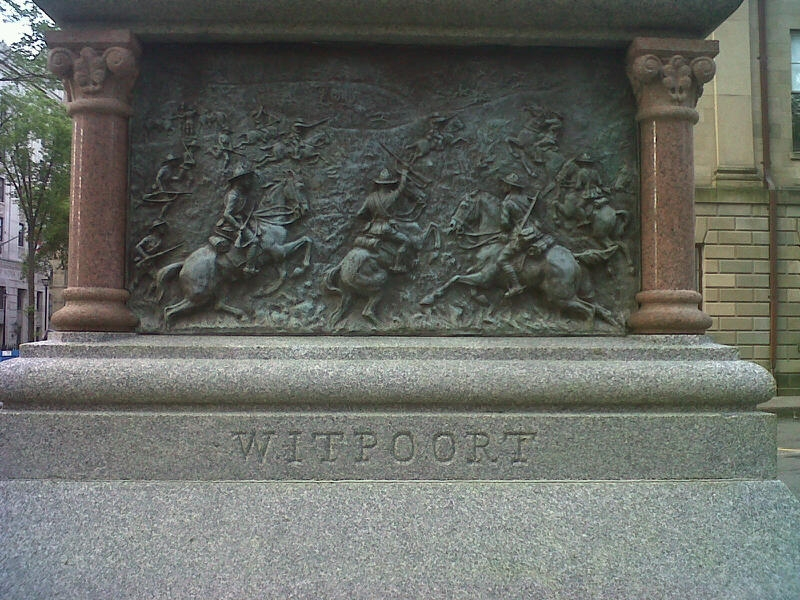
Battle of Witpoort, Boer War Monument, Province House, Nova Scotia

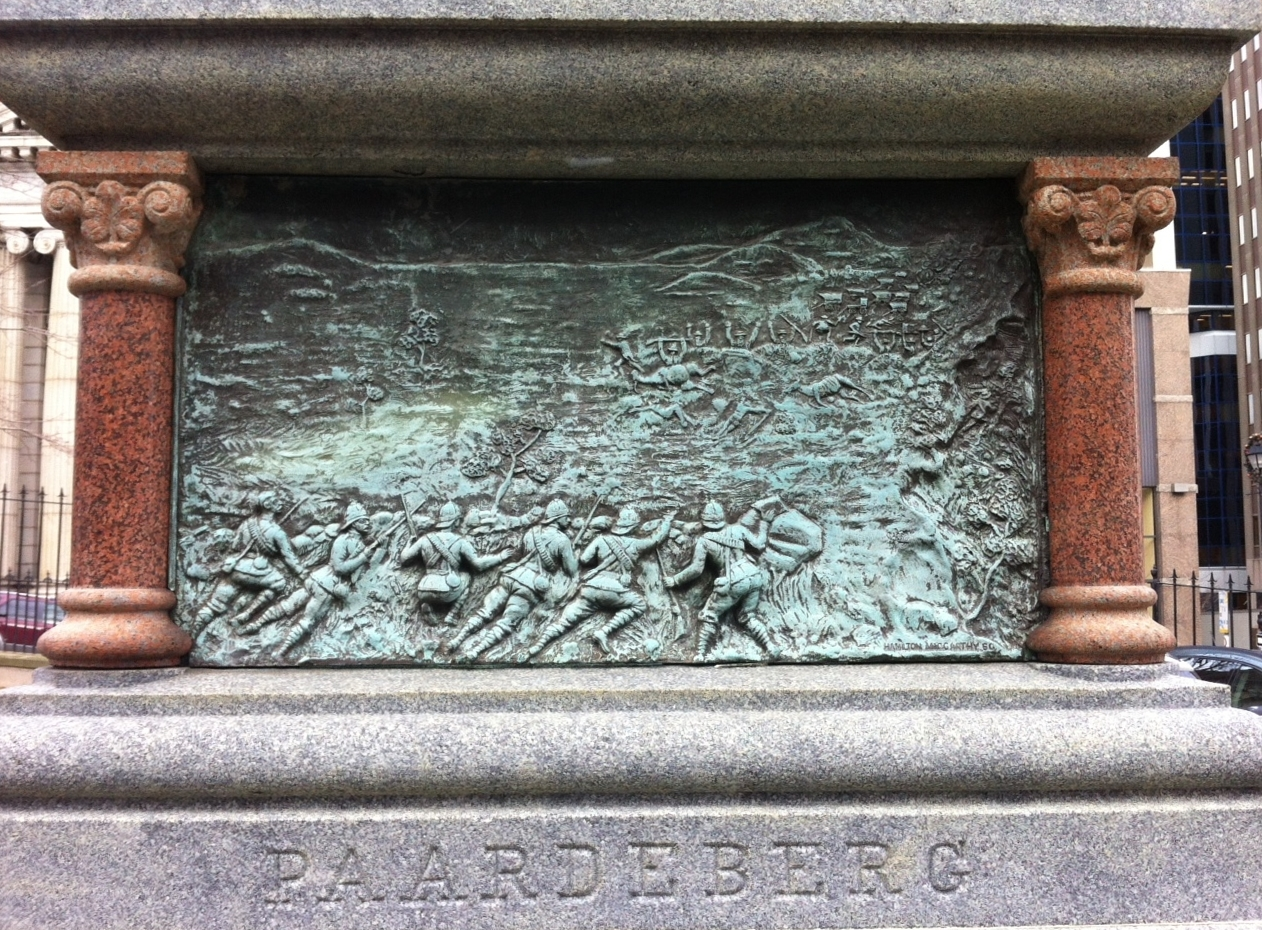
Battle of Paardeberg

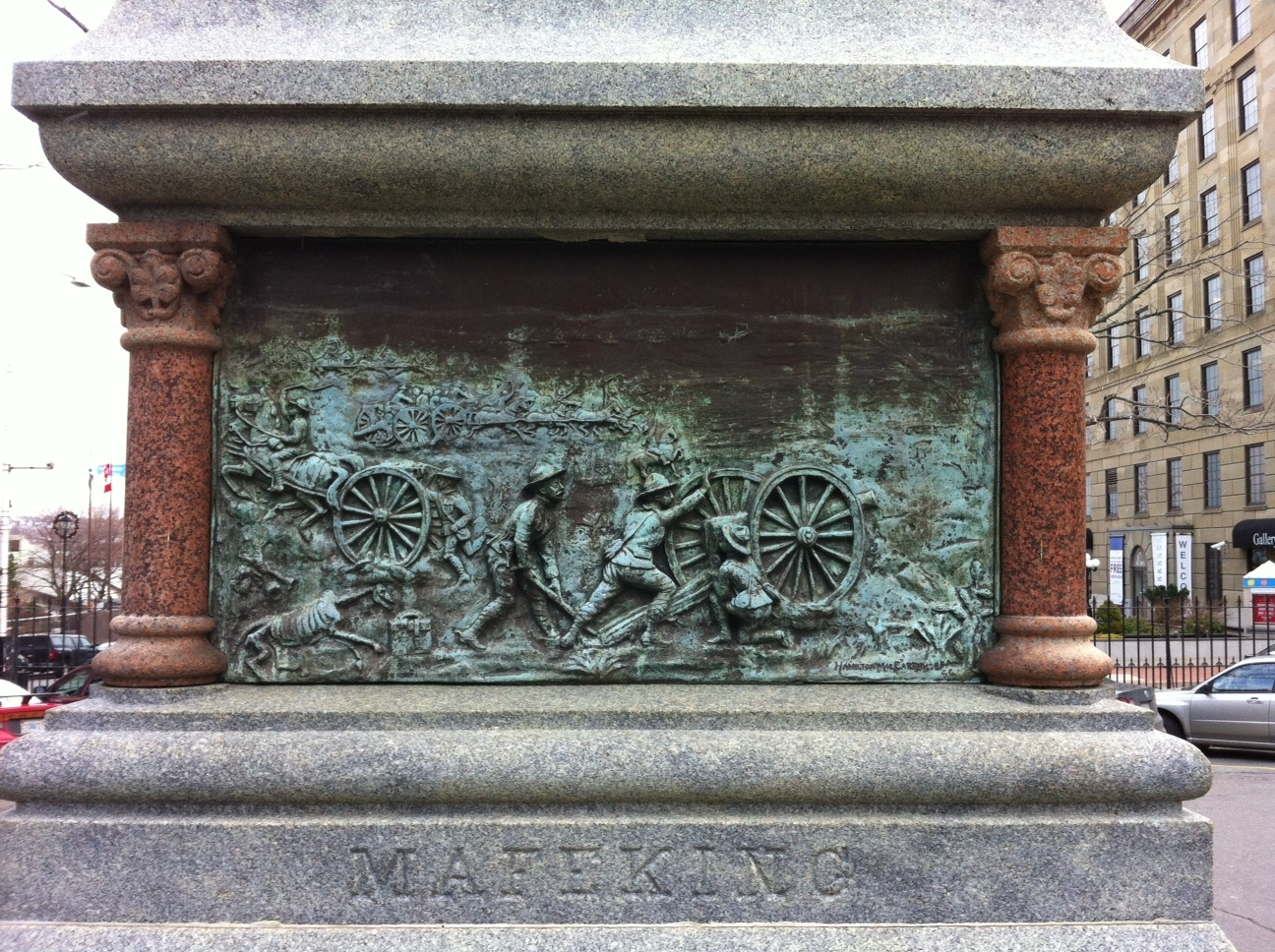
Siege of Mafeking

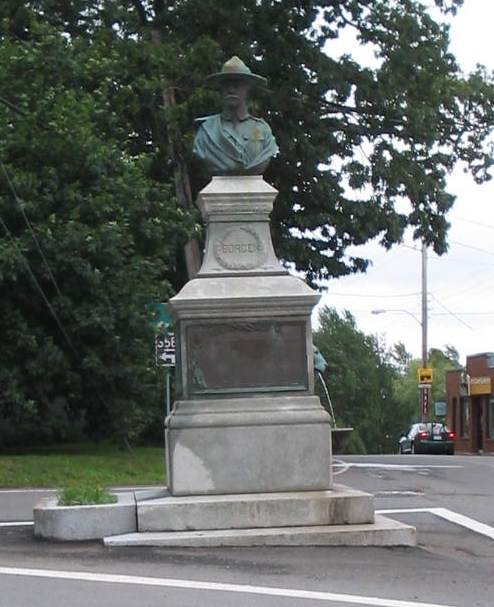
Harold Borden Monument, Canning, Nova Scotia

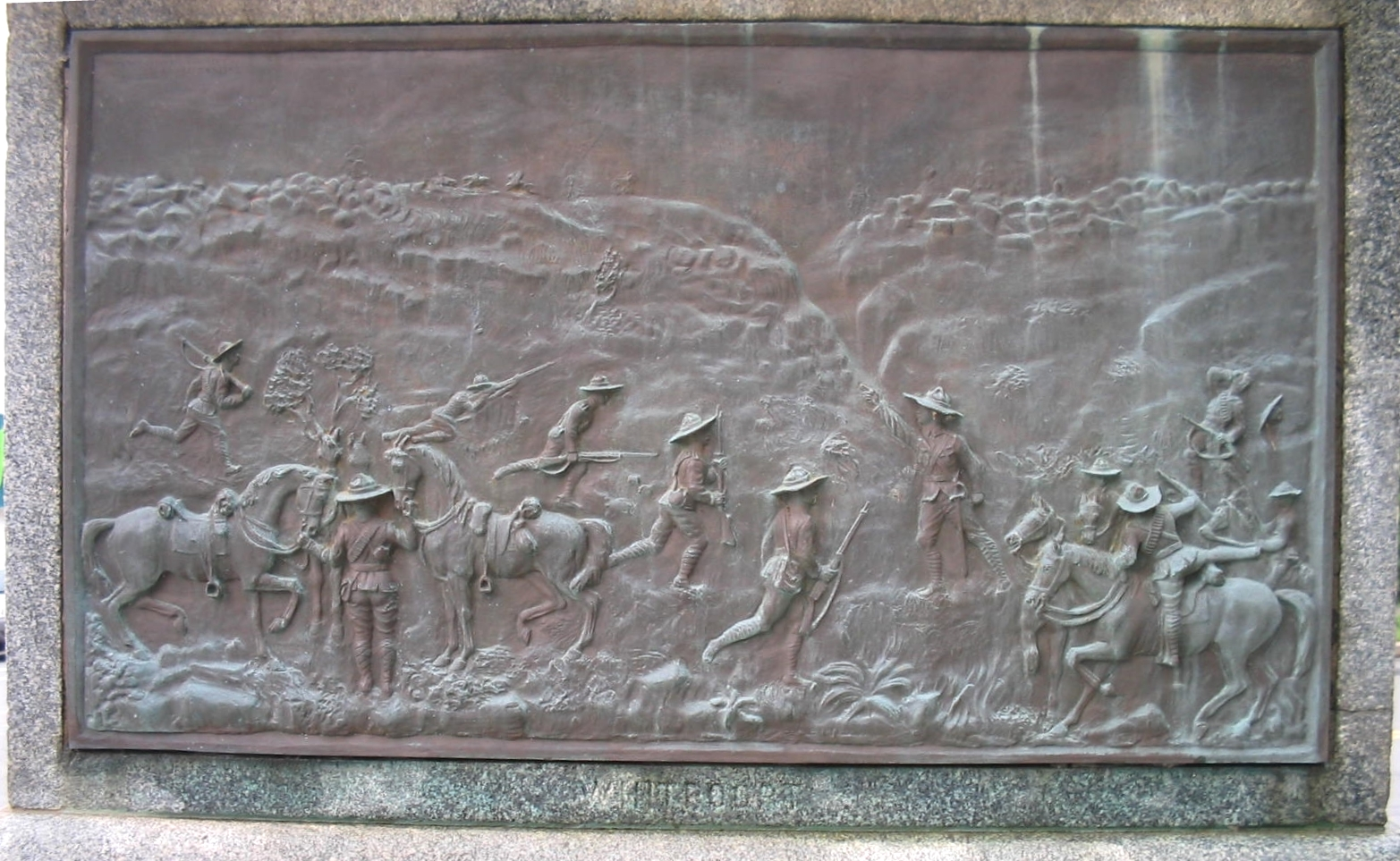
Battle of Witpoort, Harold Borden Monument, Canning, Nova Scotia

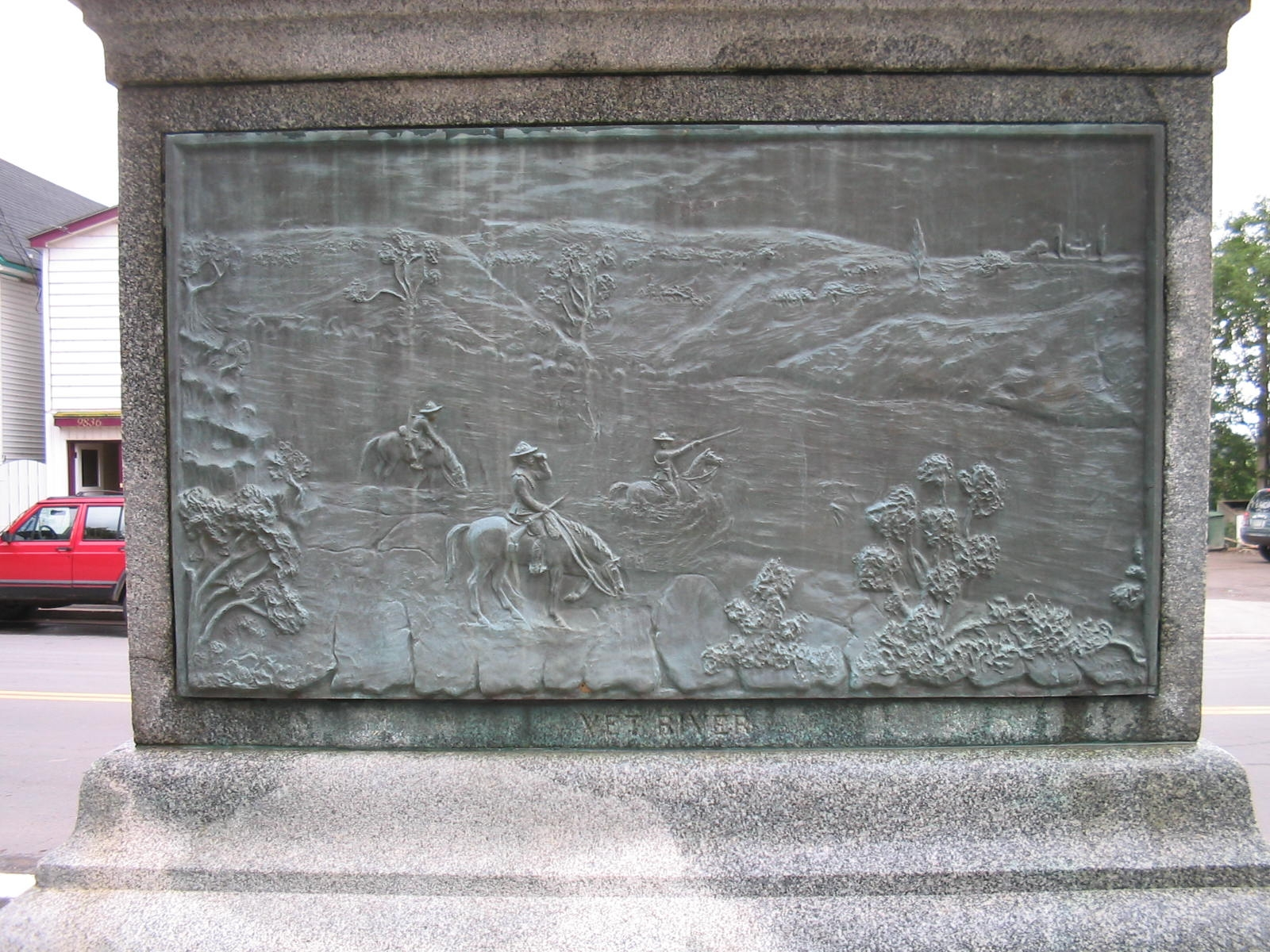
Battle of Cortzee Drift (Vet River), Harold Borden Monument, Canning, Nova Scotia

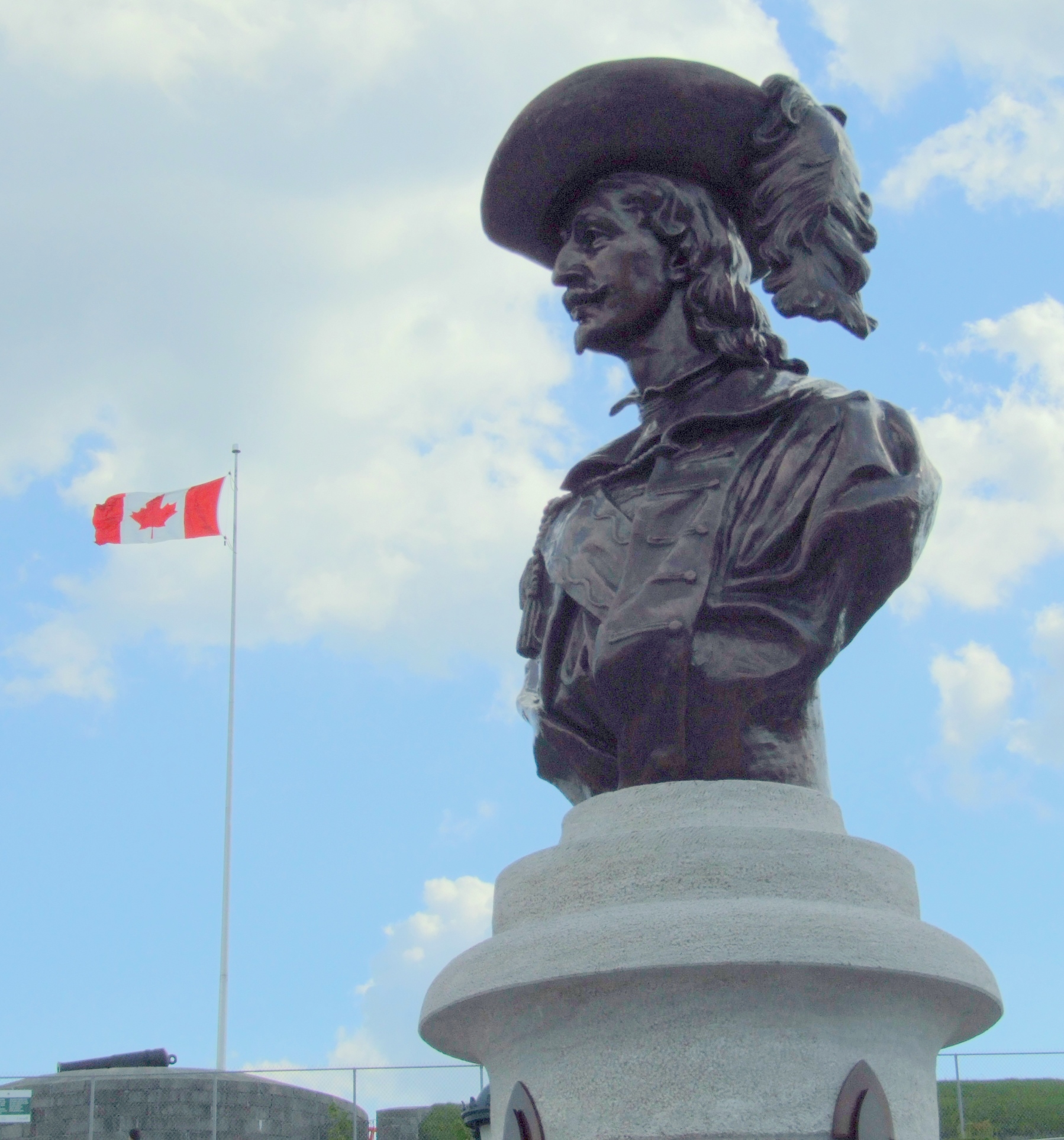
Pierre Dugua, Sieur de Mons, Quebec City (An exact replica of the bust at Annapolis Royal, Nova Scotia)

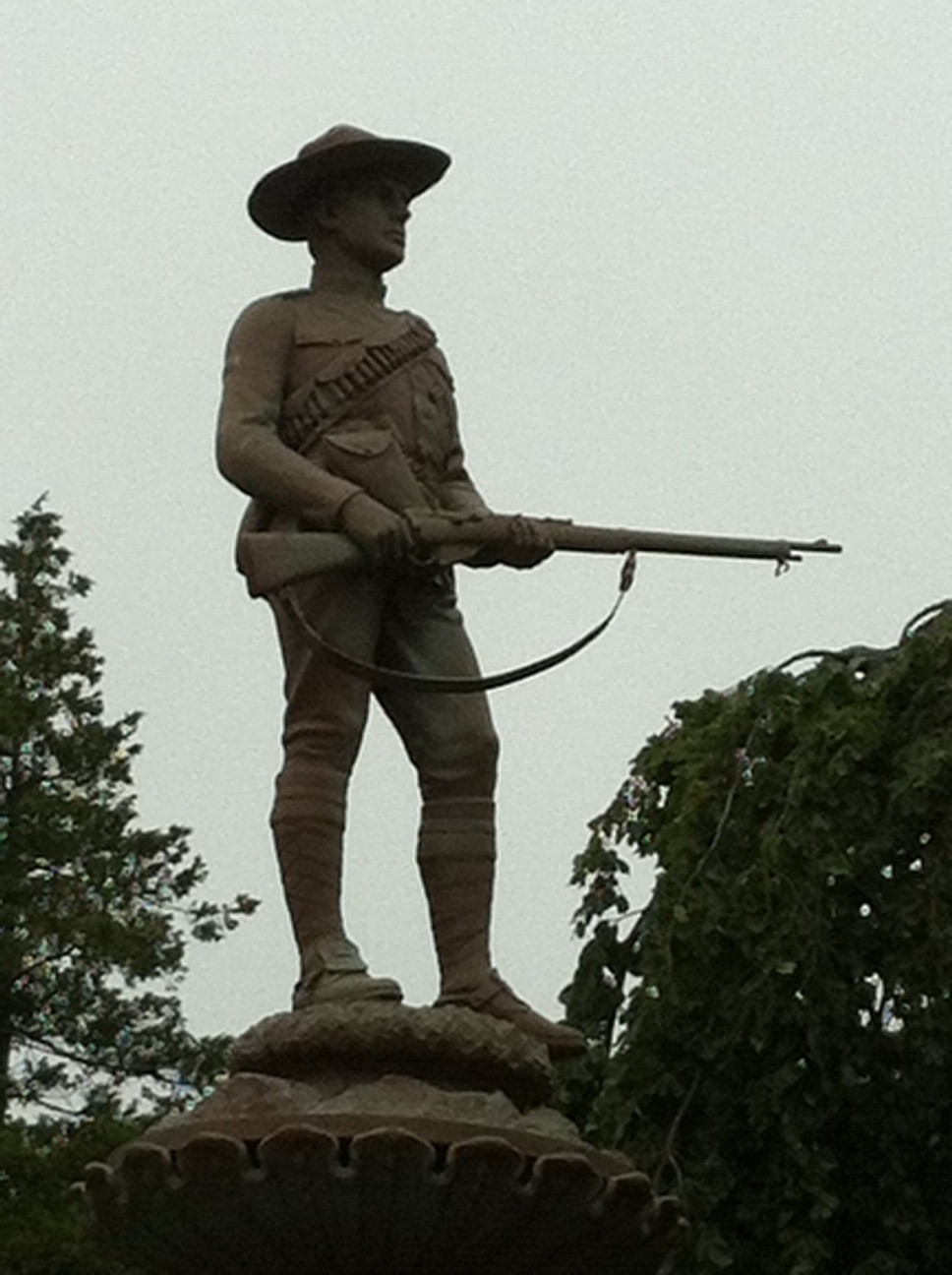
Boer War Sculpture, Halifax Public Gardens (1903)

=== Toronto ===
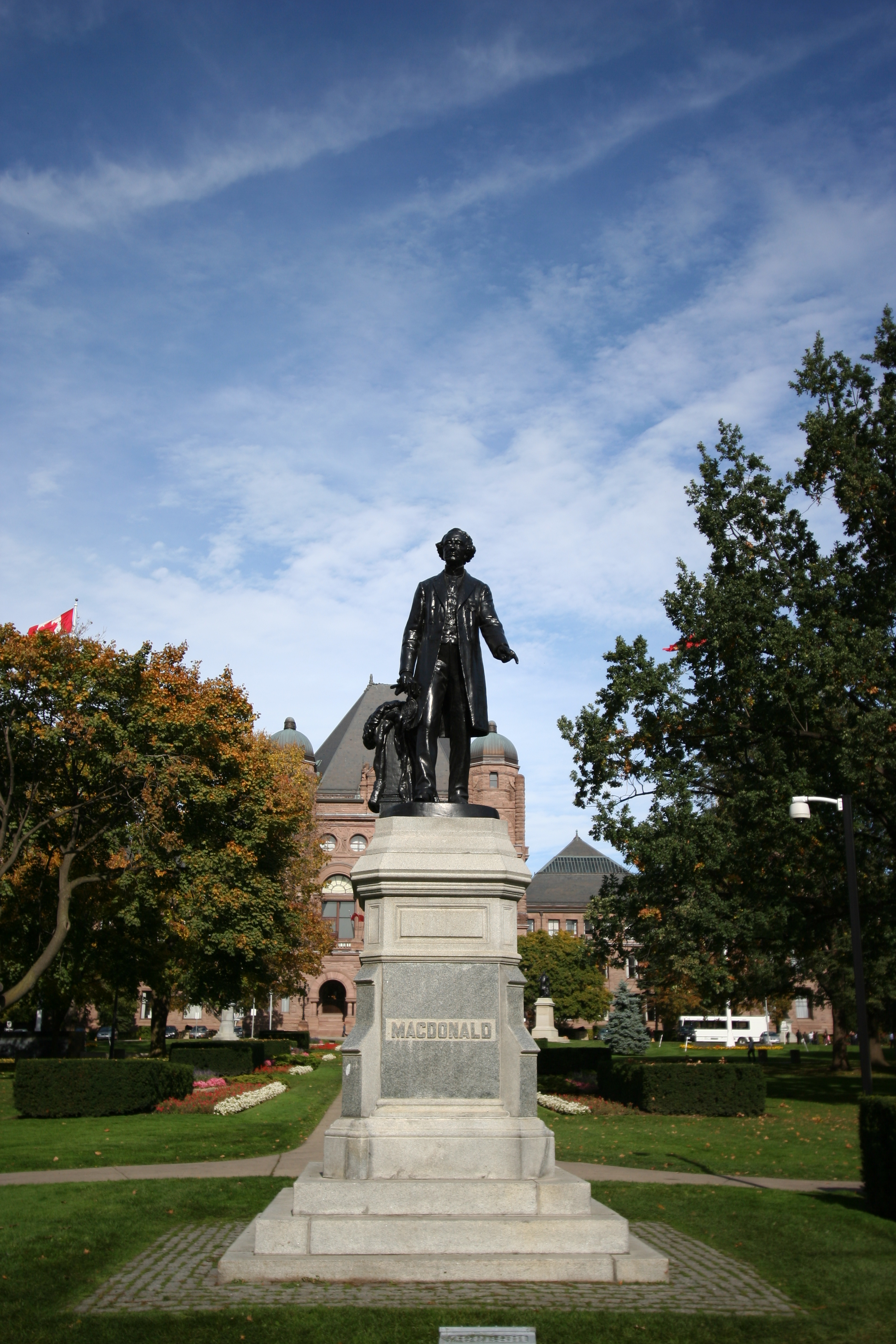
Sir John A. Macdonald, Queen's Park (Toronto)

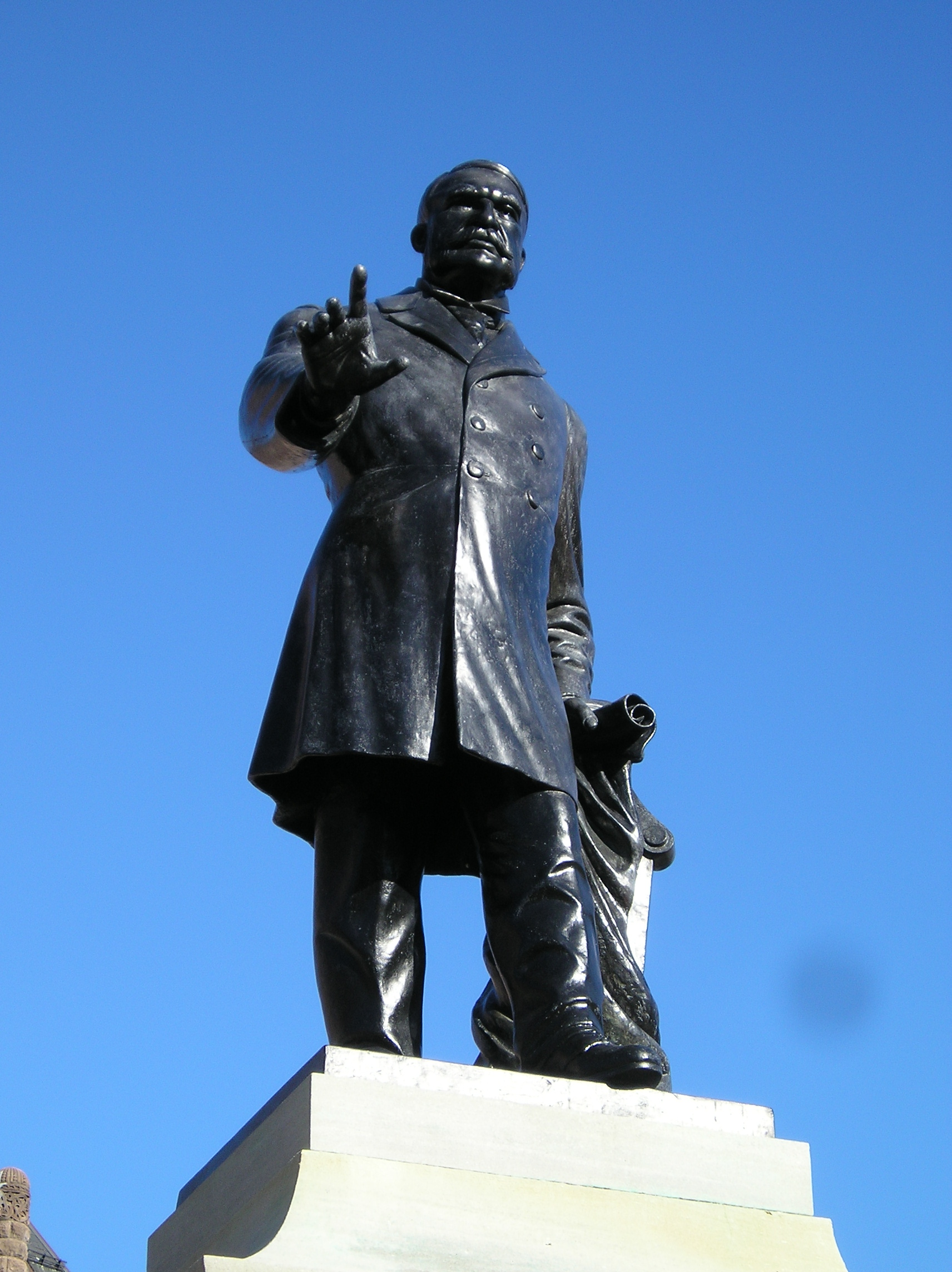
Sir James Pliny Whitney, Queen's Park, Toronto

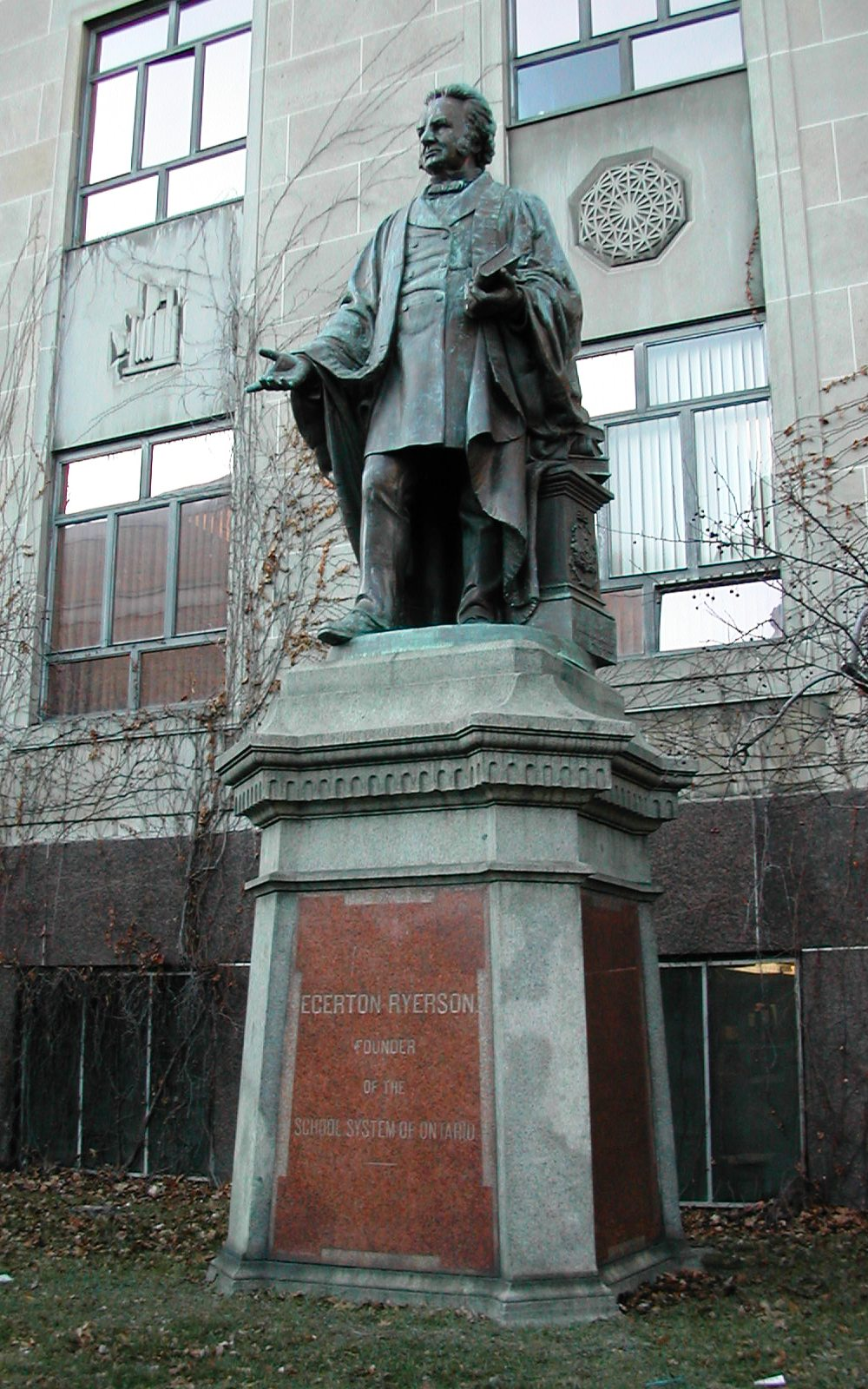
Egerton Ryerson, Ryerson University, Toronto (1889-2021) removed by protesters demonstrating against Ryerson's role in the Canadian Indian residential school system.

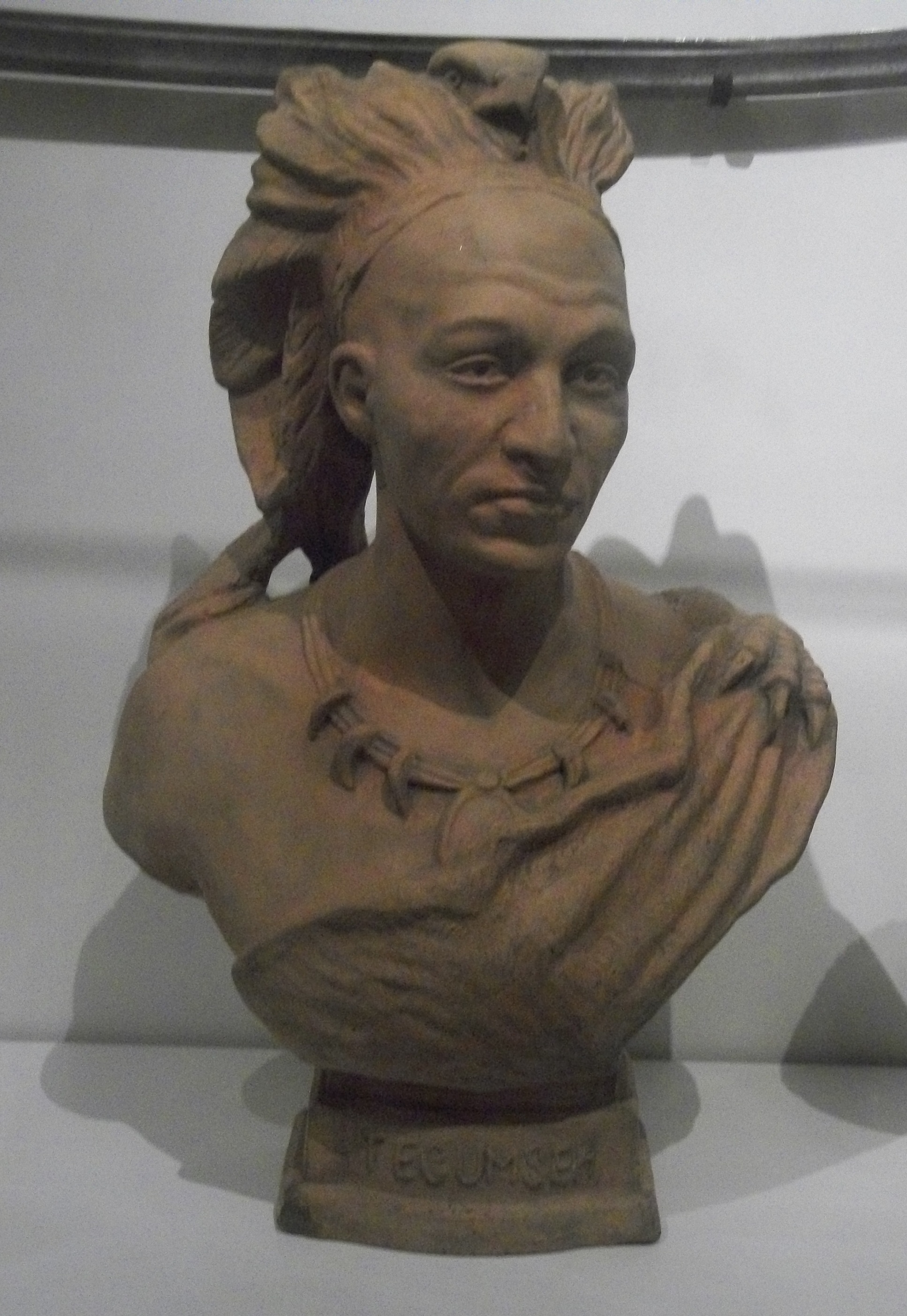
Tecumseh, Royal Ontario Museum, Toronto

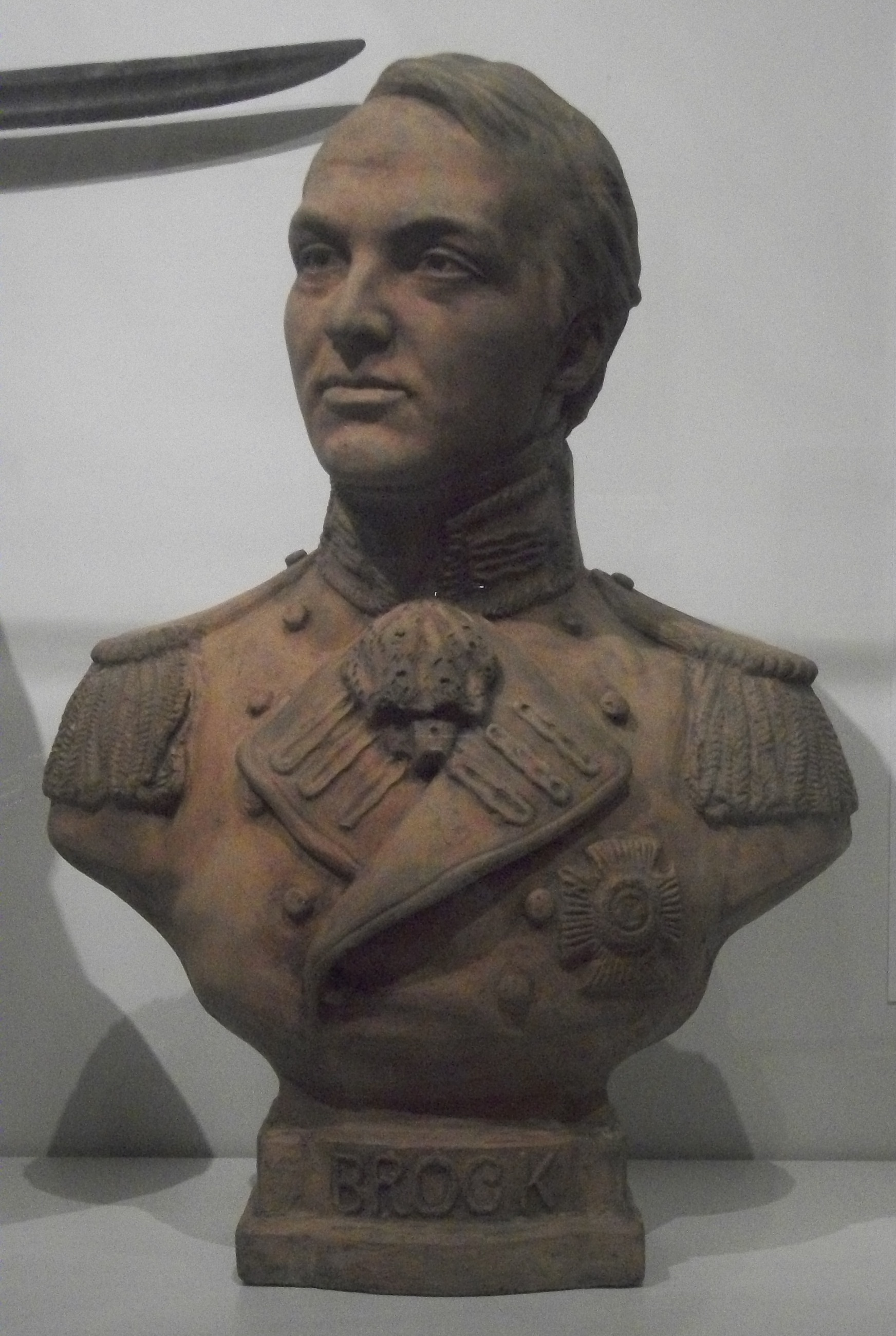
General Isaac Brock, Royal Ontario Museum, Toronto

=== Other ===
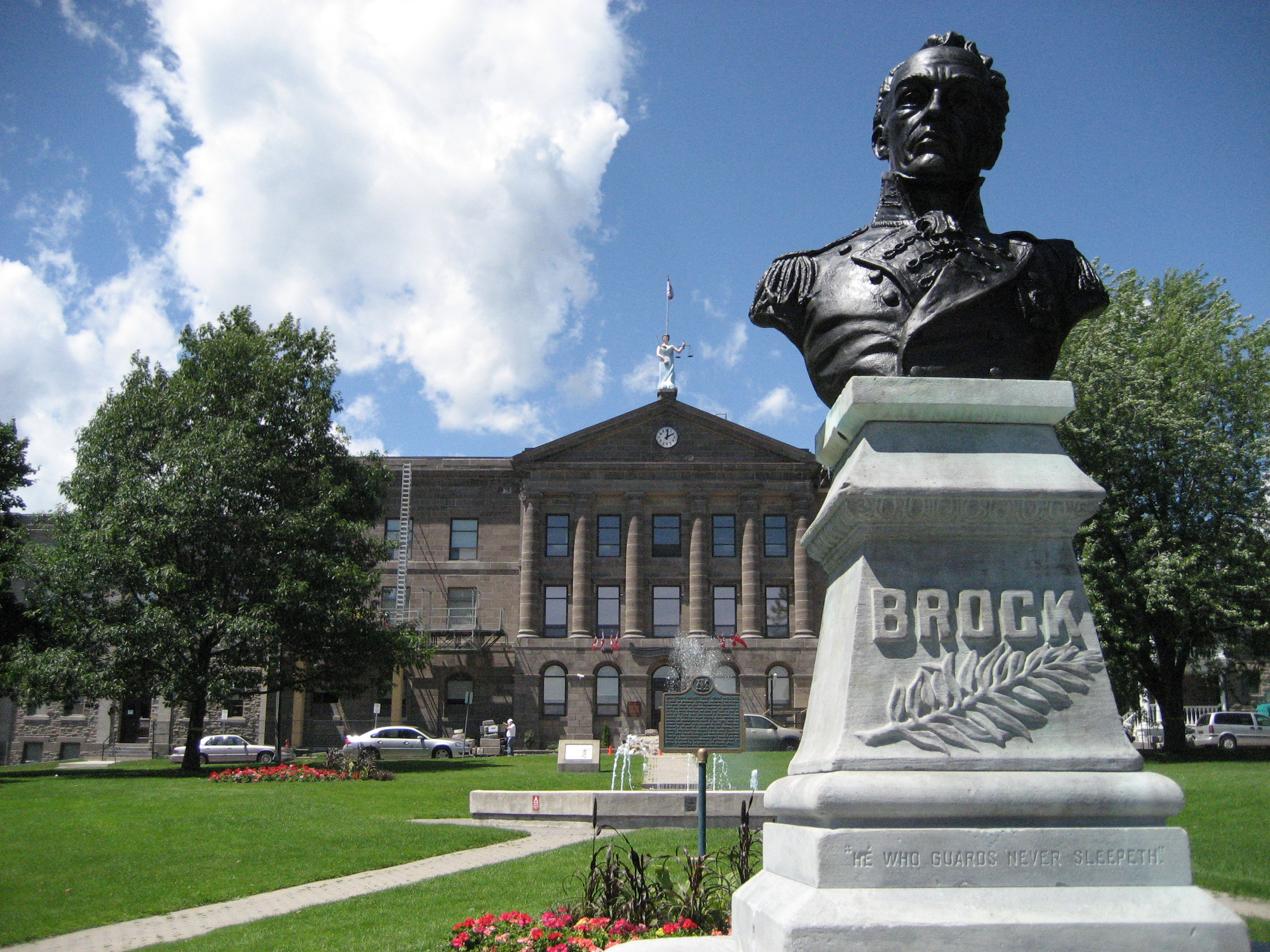
General Brock, Courthouse, Brockville, Ontario

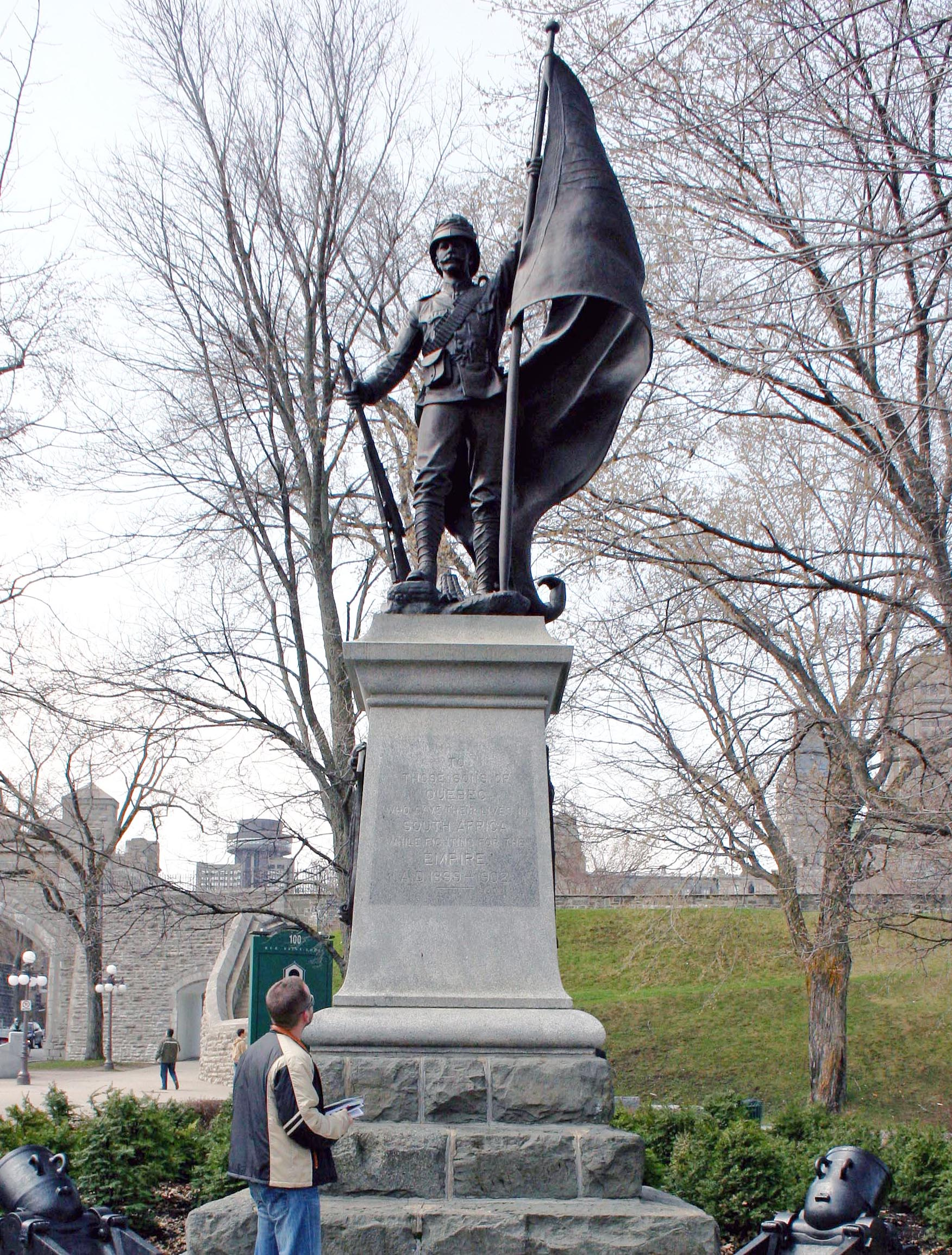
Boer War Monument, Quebec City, Quebec (1902)

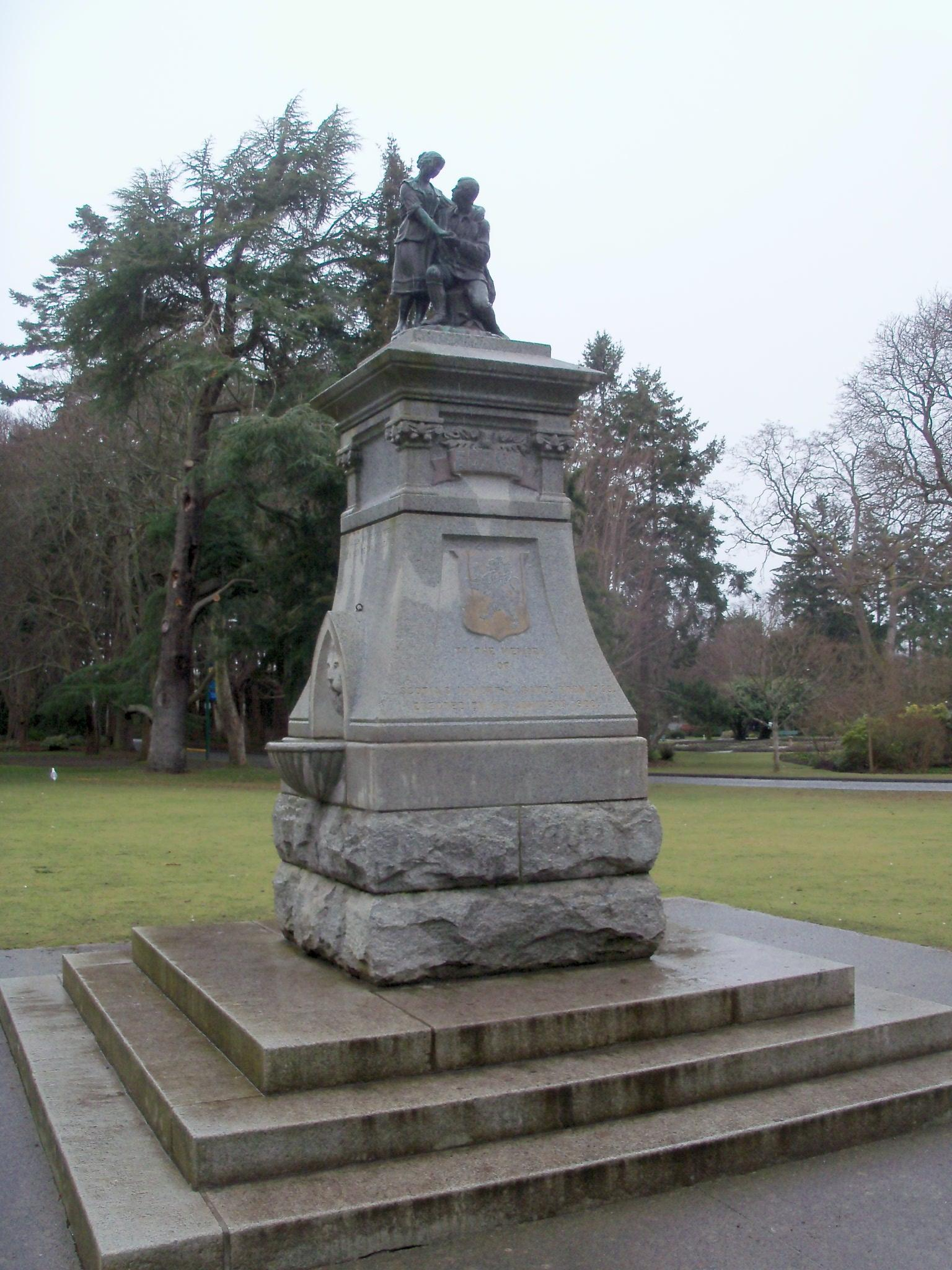
Robert Burns monument by Hamilton MacCarthy, Beacon Hill Park, Victoria, British Columbia, Canada, referencing an embraced Highland Mary

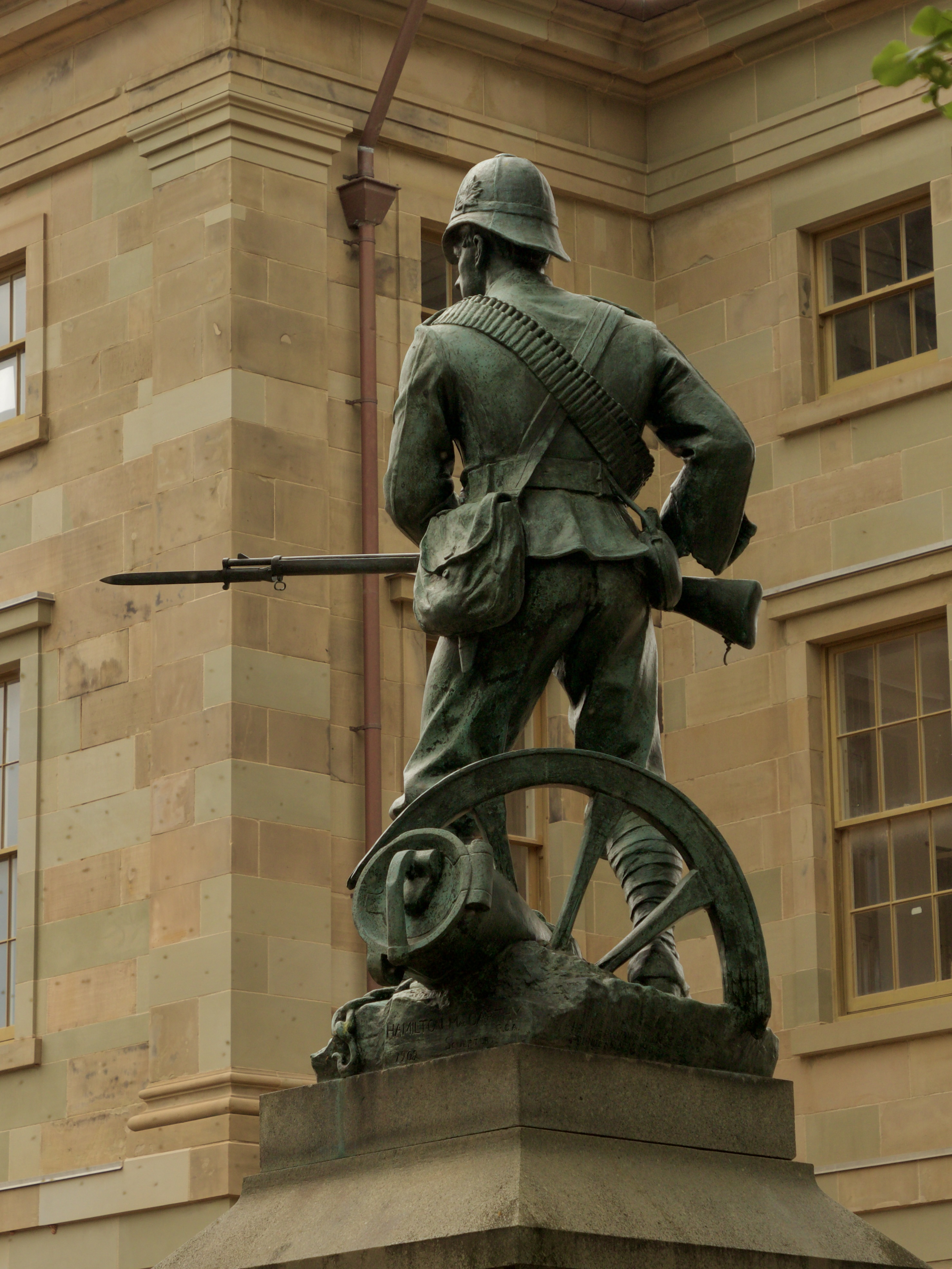
Boer War Memorial, Charlottetown, Prince Edward Island (c.1900s)
- Parting of Paul and Virginia (1876)
- Boer War Monument at Province House, Charlottetown, Prince Edward Island
- Boer War Monument, Brantford, Ontario (1903)
- Hamlet and Ophelia (1880)
- Lucius O'Brien - National Gallery of Canada
- Queen Victoria - bust, (1897)
- Champlain, Saint John, New Brunswick Queen Square South End.
- Brown Moose, bust of fictional Mohawk warrior (within Conan Doyle’s “the refugees”) 1896
