= Nepean Bay, South Australia =

Nepean Bay
- Town
- Coordinates: 35°44′7″S 137°35′20″E
- Country: Australia
- State: South Australia
- Region: Fleurieu and Kangaroo Island
- LGA: Kangaroo Island Council
- Location: 128 km (80 mi) from Adelaide; 10 km (6.2 mi) from Kingscote
- Established: 2002

Government
  - State electorate: Mawson
  - Federal division: Mayo

Population
  - Total: 140 (SAL 2021)
- Time zone: UTC+9:30 (ACST)
  - Summer (DST): UTC+10:30 (ACST)
- Postcode: 5223
- County: Carnarvon
- Mean max temp: 21.0 °C (69.8 °F)
- Mean min temp: 8.9 °C (48.0 °F)
- Annual rainfall: 444.0 mm (17.48 in)
Localities around Nepean Bay
Cygnet River	Nepean Bay	Nepean Bay
Cygnet River	Nepean Bay	Nepean Bay; Ballast Head
MacGillivray	Haines; Ballast Head	Ballast Head
- Climate; Adjoining localities

Nepean Bay is a locality in the Australian state of South Australia located on the southern shore of Western Cove in Nepean Bay on the north coast of Kangaroo Island and about 128 kilometres (80 miles) south-west of the state capital of Adelaide and about 10 kilometres (6.2 miles) south-south-west of the municipal seat of Kingscote.

The settlement in Nepean Bay was laid out by Nepean Developments Ltd in 1961 on sections 143 and 144 in the cadastral unit of the Hundred of Haines. Its boundaries were created in May 2002 for “the long established name” which is derived from the adjoining bay.

Nepean Bay consists of land zoned for agricultural use with a settlement consisting mainly of low-rise dwellings located at its western end. The Nepean Bay Conservation Park is also located within the locality about 1.5 kilometres (0.93 mi) to the east of the settlement.

The 2016 Australian census which was conducted in August 2016 reports that Nepean Bay had a population of 131 people.

Nepean Bay is located within the federal division of Mayo, the state electoral district of Mawson and the local government area of the Kangaroo Island Council.

== See also ==
- Nepean (disambiguation)
