= Evan Nepean =

British colonial administrator (1752–1822)

The Right Honourable Sir Evan Nepean Bt FRS
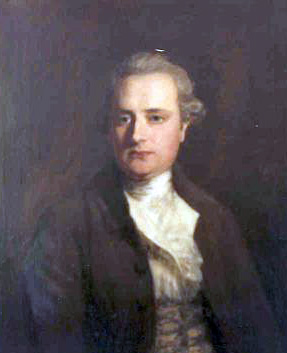

Governor of Bombay
- In office 1812–1819
- Preceded by: George Brown
- Succeeded by: Mountstuart Elphinstone

Personal details
- Born: 9 July 1752 St Stephens by Saltash, Cornwall, England
- Died: 2 October 1822 (aged 70) Loders, Dorset, England
- Spouse: Margaret Skinner
- Children: 8
- Parent: Nicholas Nepean
- Occupation: Politician; colonial administrator

Sir Evan Nepean, 1st Baronet, PC FRS (9 July 1752 – 2 October 1822) was a British politician and colonial administrator. He was the first of the Nepean baronets.

== Family ==
Nepean was born at St. Stephens near Saltash, Cornwall, the second of three sons of Nicholas Nepean, an innkeeper, and his second wife, Margaret Jones. His father was Cornish and his mother was from South Wales. The name "Nepean" is thought to come from the village of Nanpean ("the head of the valley"), in Cornwall.

Nepean married Margaret Skinner, the only daughter of Capt. William Skinner, on 6 June 1782 at the Garrison Church at Greenwich. They had eight children, including Sir Molyneux Hyde Nepean, 2nd Bt., and Maj.-Gen. William Nepean, whose daughter Anna Maria Nepean married General Sir William Parke. Their youngest child, Rev. Canon Evan Nepean, became the Canon of Westminster and a Chaplain in Ordinary to Queen Victoria. His grandson Charles was a Middlesex county cricketer who also played football.

== Career ==
Nepean entered the Royal Navy on 28 December 1773, serving on HMS Boyne as a clerk to Capt. Hartwell. He was promoted to purser in 1775. In 1776 during the American Revolutionary War he served as secretary to Real Admiral Molyneux Shuldham whilst Purser of HMS Falcon whilst at Boston, then following its evacuation, Halifax and Staten Island. He served again at Plymouth (1777–78). From 1780 to 1782 he was Purser on HMS Foudroyant for Captain John Jervis (later Lord St. Vincent).

On 3 March 1782 (aged 29) he was appointed Permanent Under-Secretary of State for the Home Department. In this position, he came to have responsibility for naval and political intelligence which led to him running a network of spies across Europe. This, in effect, made him Britain's top civilian intelligence official, before the establishment of a formal intelligence service, which did not take place until 1909 with the establishment of the domestically-focused Security Service (MI5) and the foreign-focused Secret Intelligence Service (SIS). He served there until December 1791, when he became Under-Secretary of State for War in 1794, Secretary to the Board of Admiralty 1795–1804, Chief Secretary for Ireland 1804–1805, Commissioner of the Admiralty, and then Governor of Bombay 1812–1819. During the 1797 Spithead and Nore Mutinies, Nepean was heavily involved in the communications and negotiations across government departments and between the state and the mutinous sailors.

He was Member of Parliament for Queenborough from 1796 till 1802, then moving to Bridport where he remained until 1812. The Bridport Town Hall, designed by architect William Tyler RA, was given a clock tower with cupola, in about 1805, by Sir Evan. He was made a baronet in 1802 and was admitted to the Privy Council of the United Kingdom in 1804.

In 1820 he was made a member of the Royal Society. In 1822 he was appointed High Sheriff of Dorset but died in office the same year at his estate at Loders.

== Legacy ==
Places named after Evan Nepean include:

- Australia - the Nepean River in New South Wales, the Nepean Highway and Point Nepean both in Victoria, Nepean Bay in South Australia and Nepean Island in the external territory of Norfolk Island.
- Canada - the former city of Nepean, Ontario, Nepean Point, Nepean Bay.
- India - the Nepean Road and Nepean Sea Road in Mumbai.

== Arms ==
Coat of arms of Evan Nepean
Crest On a mount Vert a goat passant Sable charged on the side with two Ermine spots in fesse Or collared and horned Gold Escutcheon Gules a fesse wavy Erminois between three mullets Argent. Motto Respice (Look Back)

Parliament of Great Britain
Preceded by Richard Hopkins; John Sargent	Member of Parliament for Queenborough; 1796–1801; With: John Sargent	Succeeded by Parliament of the United Kingdom
Parliament of the United Kingdom
Preceded by Parliament of Great Britain	Member of Parliament for Queenborough; 1801–1802; With: John Sargent	Succeeded by John Prinsep; George Peter Moore
Preceded by Charles Sturt; George Barclay	Member of Parliament for Bridport; 1802–1812; With: George Barclay 1802–1807; Sir Samuel Hood 1807–1812	Succeeded by William Best; Sir Horace St Paul
Political offices
Preceded by None	Under-Secretary of State for the Home Department; 1782	Succeeded by Thomas Orde
Preceded by John Bell	Under-Secretary of State for the Home Department; 1782–1794	Succeeded by John King
Preceded by None	Under-Secretary of State for War; 1794–1795	Succeeded by William Huskisson
Preceded by Philip Stephens	First Secretary to the Admiralty; 1795–1804	Succeeded by William Marsden
Preceded by William Wickham	Chief Secretary for Ireland; 1804–1805	Succeeded by Nicholas Vansittart
Preceded by George Brown	Governor of Bombay; 1812–1819	Succeeded by Mountstuart Elphinstone
Baronetage of the United Kingdom
New creation	Baronet (of Bothenhampton); 1802–1822	Succeeded by Molyneux Hyde Nepean
