= Molyneux Nepean =

English cricketer

Personal information
- Full name: Molyneux Hyde Nepean
- Born: 20 September 1783; England
- Died: 4 June 1856 (aged 72); Hexham, Northumberland

Domestic team information
- Years: Team
- 1808: Marylebone Cricket Club (MCC)
- Source: CricketArchive, 24 March 2013

Sir Molyneux Nepean, 2nd Baronet (20 September 1783 – 4 June 1856) was an English cricketer who played a single match for the Marylebone Cricket Club.

== Life ==
He was the eldest son of Sir Evan Nepean, 1st Baronet and his wife Margaret Skinner. He was educated at Eton College. In 1801 he matriculated at Trinity College, Cambridge, graduating B.A. in 1805 and M.A. in 1808. A friend from Cambridge was George Pryme.

Nepean entered Lincoln's Inn in 1803. He became clerk to the Supreme Court of Jamaica, a post he held for nearly 30 years.

As a cricketer, Nepean is recorded in one match, totalling 0 runs with a highest score of 0 not out. He succeeded as 2nd Baronet Nepean of Bothenhampton in October 1822.

== Family ==
Nepean married first, in 1813, Charlotte Tilghman (died 1838), youngest daughter of Philemon (or Philip) Tilghman, son of James Tilghman and brother of Tench Tilghman, who served in the Royal Navy and his wife Harriet, daughter of Mark Milbanke. They had three sons and six daughters; the eldest son Molyneux succeeded his father in his title. The third son, Evan Philip Tilghman (born 1818) served in the Bengal Army. Of the daughters, Frances Augusta married James Blair Grove R.N.

He married secondly, in 1852, Lydia Clark Wright (d. 1871), eldest daughter of William Clark Wright, of Murton House, Northumberland, by Charlotte Sarah Parr, and sister of William Barton Wright; they had one daughter, Lilian Constance, who died young in 1853.

== Arms ==
Coat of arms of Molyneux Nepean
Crest On a mount Vert a goat passant Sable charged on the team with two Ermine spots in fesse Or collared and horned Gold Escutcheon Gules a fesse wavy Erminois between three mullets Argent. Motto Respice (Look Back)

== Bibliography ==
- Haygarth, Arthur (1862). Scores & Biographies, Volume 1 (1744–1826). Lillywhite.

Baronetage of the United Kingdom
Preceded by Evan Nepean	Baronet (of Bothenhampton); 1822–1856	Succeeded by Molyneux Nepean
