= Nepean Bay Conservation Park =

Protected area in South Australia

- IUCN category III (natural monument or feature)
- Location within South Australia
- Location: South Australia
- Nearest city: Kingscote
- Coordinates: 35°44′00″S 137°37′30″E
- Area: 32 ha (79 acres)
- Established: 11 July 1974
- Governing body: Department for Environment and Water

Nepean Bay Conservation Park is a protected area in the Australian state of South Australia on Kangaroo Island. It was dedicated in 1974 for the protection of flora and fauna, and is the only reserved area of coastal sandplain on the island.

== Description ==
The conservation park lies on the southern shoreline of Western Cove in Nepean Bay within the locality of Nepean Bay about 1.5 kilometres (0.93 mi) to the east of the locality's main settled area and about 9 km (5.6 mi) south of Kingscote. It has an area of 32 ha (79 acres). Its vegetation is mostly an open scrub of Eucalyptus diversifolia and Callitris preissii with areas of low shrubland, tussock sedgeland and Allocasuarina verticillata low open forest over a deep soil of calcareous sands. Other significant plant species include Melaleuca halmaturorum, Acacia sophorae and Leucopogon parviflorus. There is a nesting colony of fairy terns on the coast adjacent to the conservation park. tammar wallabies are common.

The conservation park is classified as an IUCN Category III protected area.
