= Nepean baronets =

Extinct baronetcy in the Baronetage of the United Kingdom

The Nepean Baronetcy, of Bothenhampton in the County of Dorset, was a title in the Baronetage of the United Kingdom. It was created on 16 July 1802 for the politician and colonial administrator Evan Nepean. He was Chief Secretary for Ireland from 1804 to 1805 and Governor of Bombay from 1812 to 1819. The title became extinct on the death of the sixth Baronet in 2002. Another member of the family to gain distinction was Herbert Evan Charles Bayley Nepean (1865–1951), son of Colonel Herbert Augustus Tierney Nepean, son of Reverend Evan Nepean, fourth son of the first Baronet. He was a Brigadier in the Indian Army. Lieutenant Colonel Evan Yorke Nepean, the 6th Baronet, was notable for having the amateur radio callsign AC4YN. With Hugh E. Richardson on a political mission to Tibet in 1936, he took this call based on his own initials and the AC4 prefix, which at that time was assigned to this country. It is famous as one of the rarest amateur stations.

The family surname was pronounced "Nepeen".

== Nepean baronets, of Bothenhampton (1802) ==
- Sir Evan Nepean, 1st Baronet (1751–1822)
- Sir Molyneux Hyde Nepean, 2nd Baronet (1783–1856)
- Sir Molyneux Hyde Nepean, 3rd Baronet (1814–1895)
- Sir Evan Yorke Nepean, 4th Baronet (1825–1903)
- Sir Charles Evan Molyneux Yorke Nepean, 5th Baronet (1867–1953)
- Sir Evan Yorke Nepean, 6th Baronet (1909–2002)

== Arms ==
Coat of arms of Nepean baronets
Crest On a mount Vert a goat passant Sable charged on the side with two Ermine spots in fesse Or collared and horned Gold Escutcheon Gules a fesse wavy Erminois between three mullets Argent. Motto Respice (Look Back)

== Notes ==
Baronetage of the United Kingdom
Preceded by Ferguson baronets	Nepean baronets of Bothenhampton; 16 July 1802	Succeeded by Baker baronets
