= Nepean Sea Road =

Neighbourhood in Mumbai, India

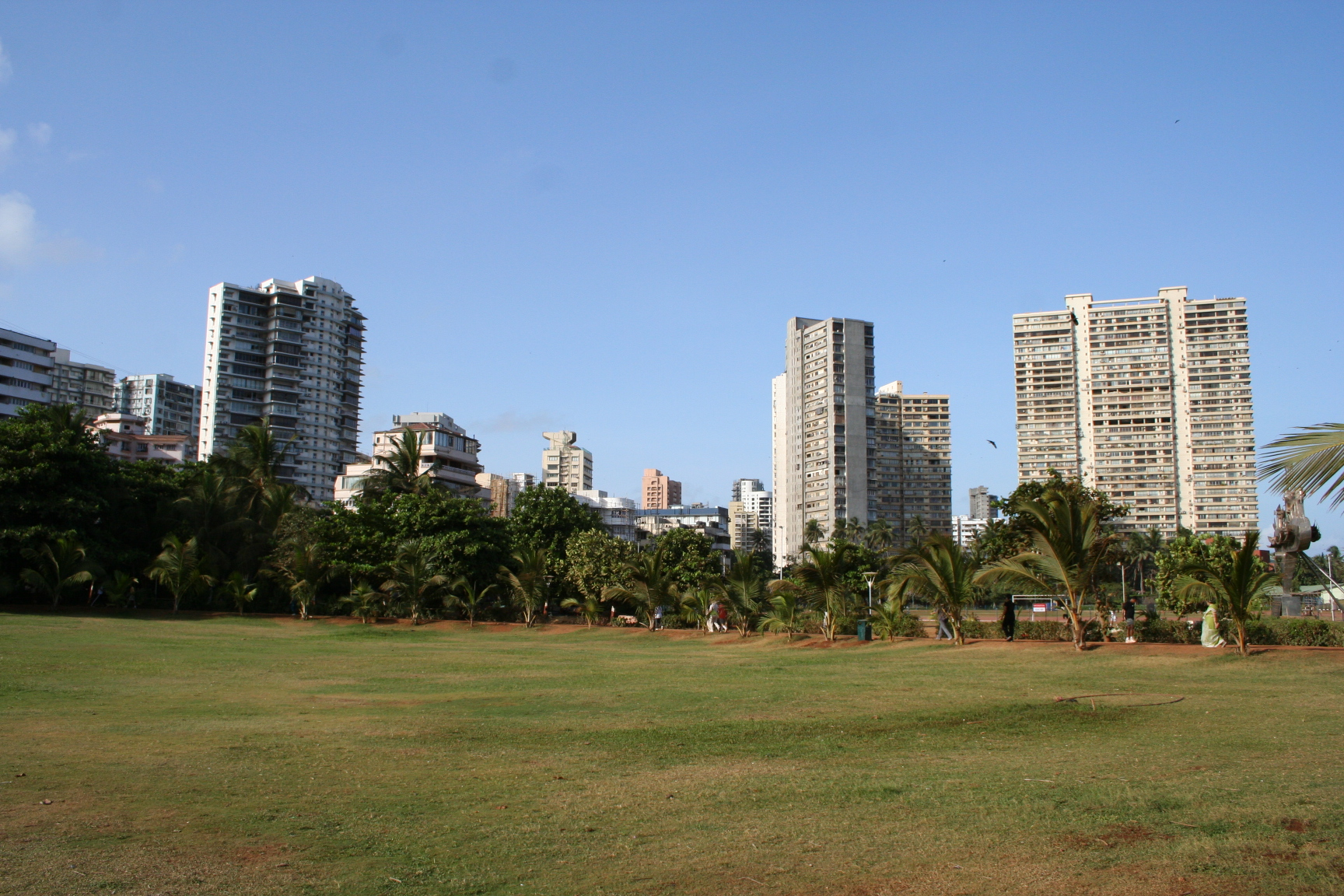
Priyadarshini Park, Nepean Sea Road

Nepean Sea Road is a neighbourhood near Malabar Hill in South Mumbai, India.

== History ==
The area is named after Sir Evan Nepean, 1st Baronet, a British politician and administrator, and the Governor of Bombay (1812–1819). This road was renamed to Lady Laxmibai Jagmohandas Marg in the 1960s, but as is the case with many other British street names that were renamed, it continues to be referred to as Nepean Sea Road.

== Geography ==
Nepean Sea Road begins from St. Stephen's Church at Warden Road and goes all the way to Chandralok, the area's upmarket shopping locale.

The Maheshwari House on Nepean Sea Road was sold to industrialist Sajjan Jindal for ₹400 crore. The Consulate General of the Russian Federation is located at 42, Nepean Sea Road.

The largest open green space in Nepean Sea Road is Priyadarshini Park which faces the sea. The Park boasts of an eight-Lane, 400-metre running track with a large football field located in it. The Park has facilities including natural walking track, tennis courts, yoga hall, gym & other sport training programs.
