= Kìwekì Point =

Peninsula in Ontario, Canada

Coordinates: 45°25′46″N 75°42′4.1″W

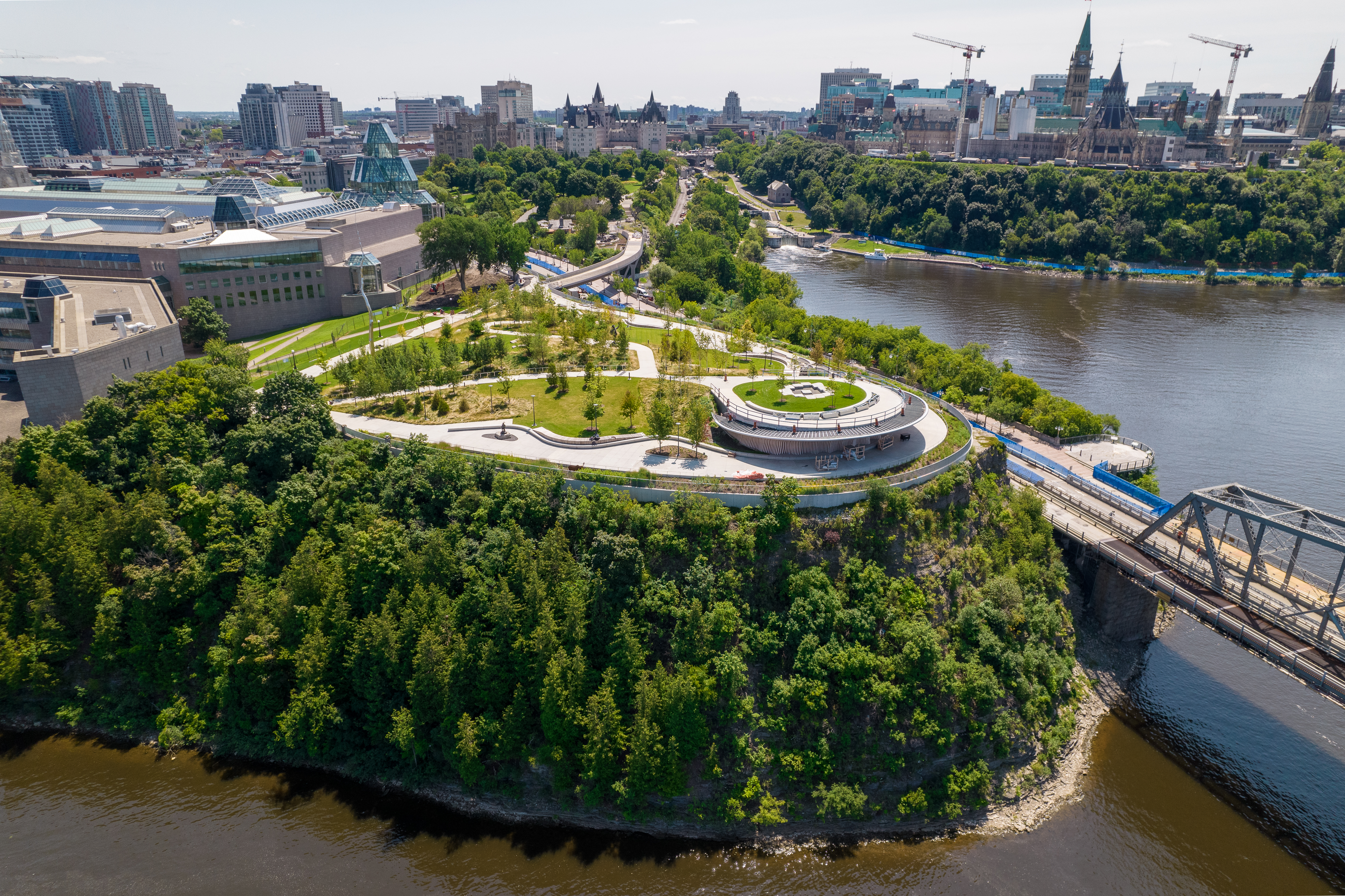
Kìwekì Point under redevelopment in July of 2024

Kìwekì Point (/kiːˈwɪkiː/), formerly Nepean Point, is a hill overlooking the Ottawa River in Ottawa, Ontario, Canada. It is located between the National Gallery of Canada and Alexandra Bridge. The site is managed by the National Capital Commission (NCC).

The hill had originally been named after Evan Nepean. At the peak of the hill is a statue of French explorer Samuel de Champlain holding his famous astrolabe upside-down. It was made by sculptor Hamilton MacCarthy in 1915. Previously, the statue also featured a kneeling Anishinabe scout, added in 1918 to "signify how the native people helped Champlain navigate through the waters of the Ottawa River". The scout statue has since been relocated to nearby Major's Hill Park and was renamed "Kitchi Zibi Omàmìwininì" in 2013. The original site also featured several other sculptures and an amphitheatre known as "Astrolabe Theatre".

In November 2019, the site was closed to begin a redevelopment project led by Janet Rosenberg & Studio, Patkau Architects, Blackwell Structural Engineers, and ERA Architects Inc. The new site, scheduled for completion in 2024, will feature two accessible lookouts, a shelter, and a pedestrian bridge connecting the site to Major's Hill Park. During the development's planning, the NCC consulted with representatives of Kitigan Zibi Anishinabeg and the Algonquins of Pikwàkanagàn. On October 4, 2022, Nepean Point was renamed Kìwekì Point in order to "highlight Algonquin voices, and showcase Algonquin culture and language". Kìwekì means "returning to one's homeland" in Algonquin.

Kìwekì Point officially reopened to the public on May 16, 2025.

== Gallery ==
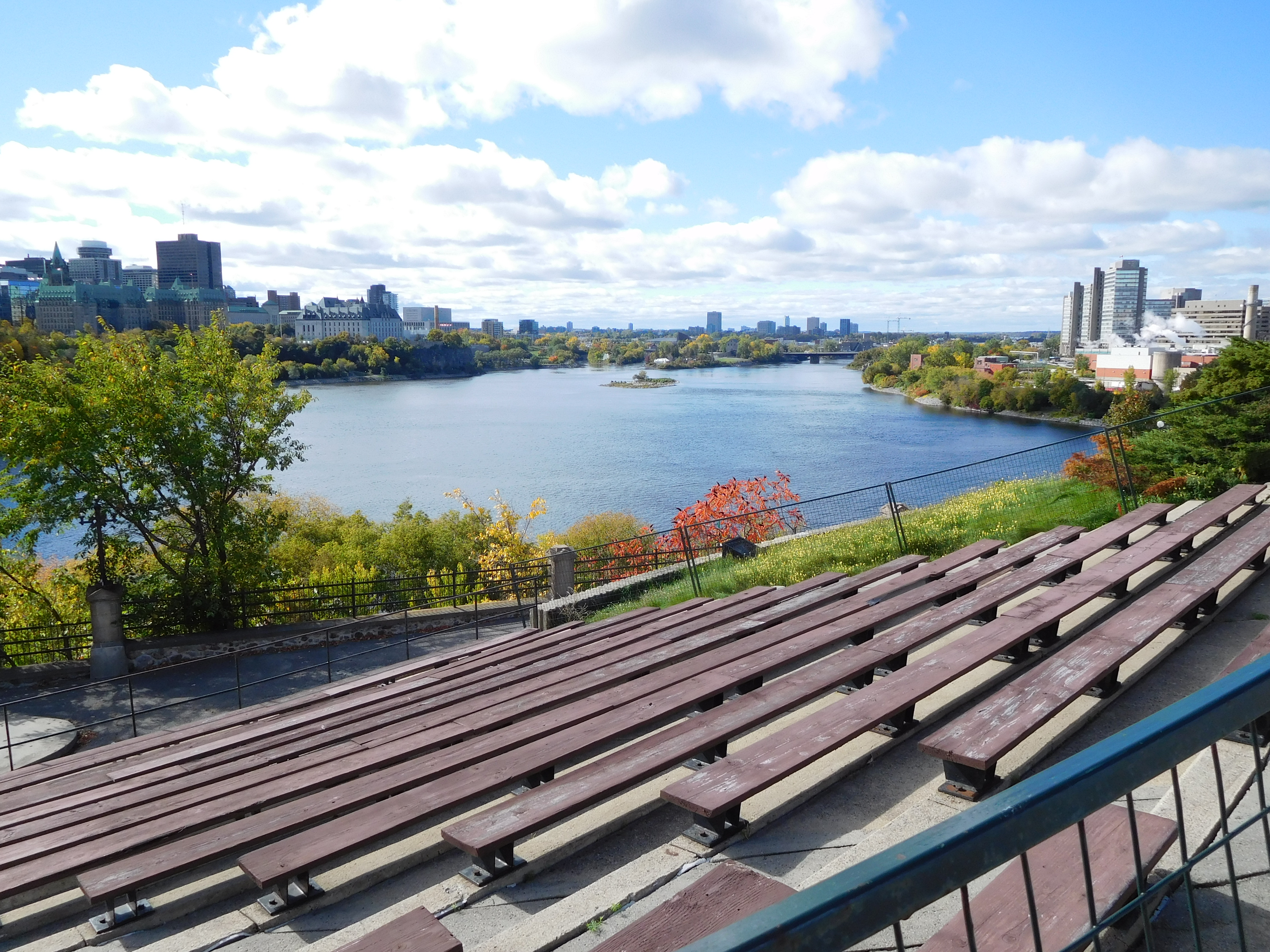
Looking upstream the Ottawa River from Kìwekì Point.

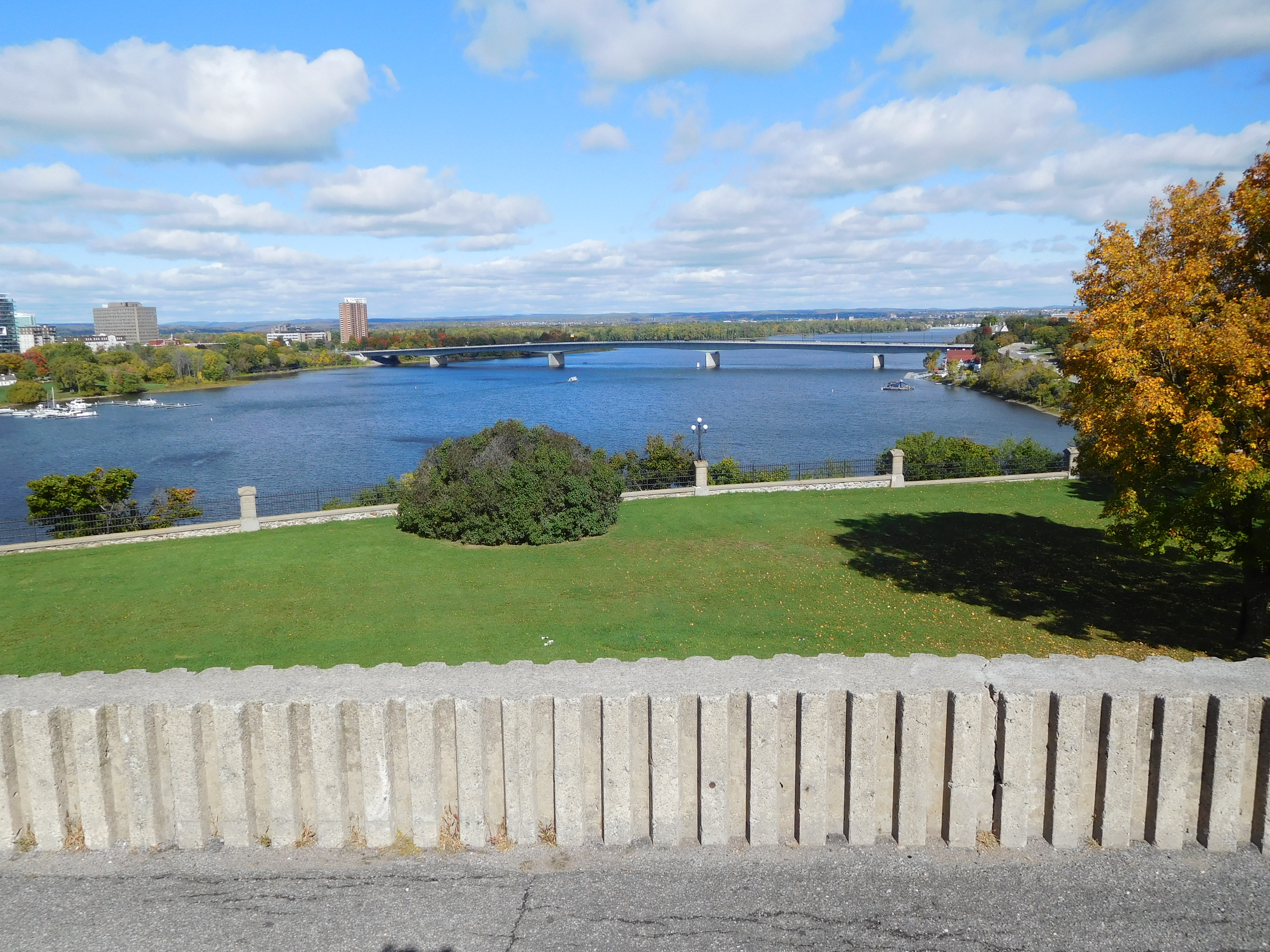
Looking downstream the Ottawa River from Kìwekì Point.

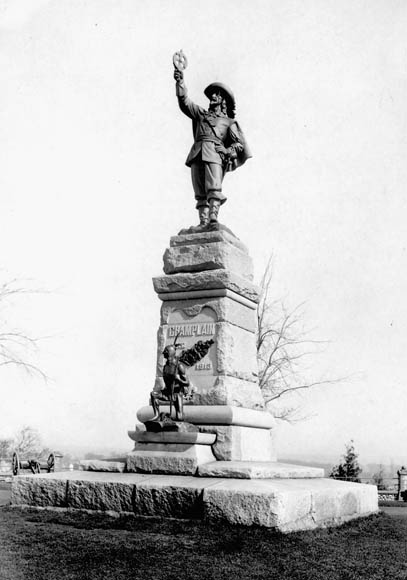
MacCarthy's statues together c. 1918—1936

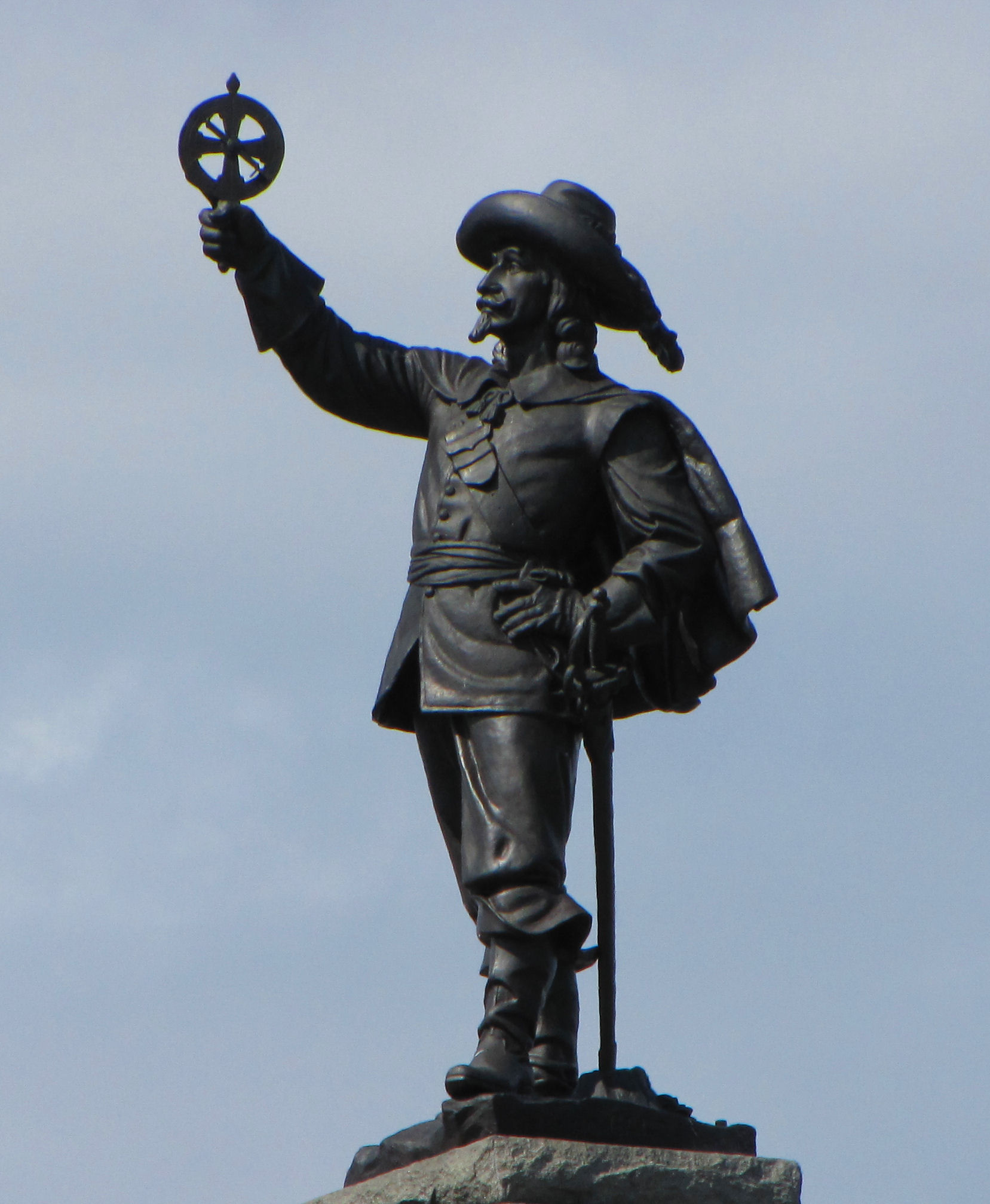
MacCarthy's Samuel de Champlain with Astrolabe.

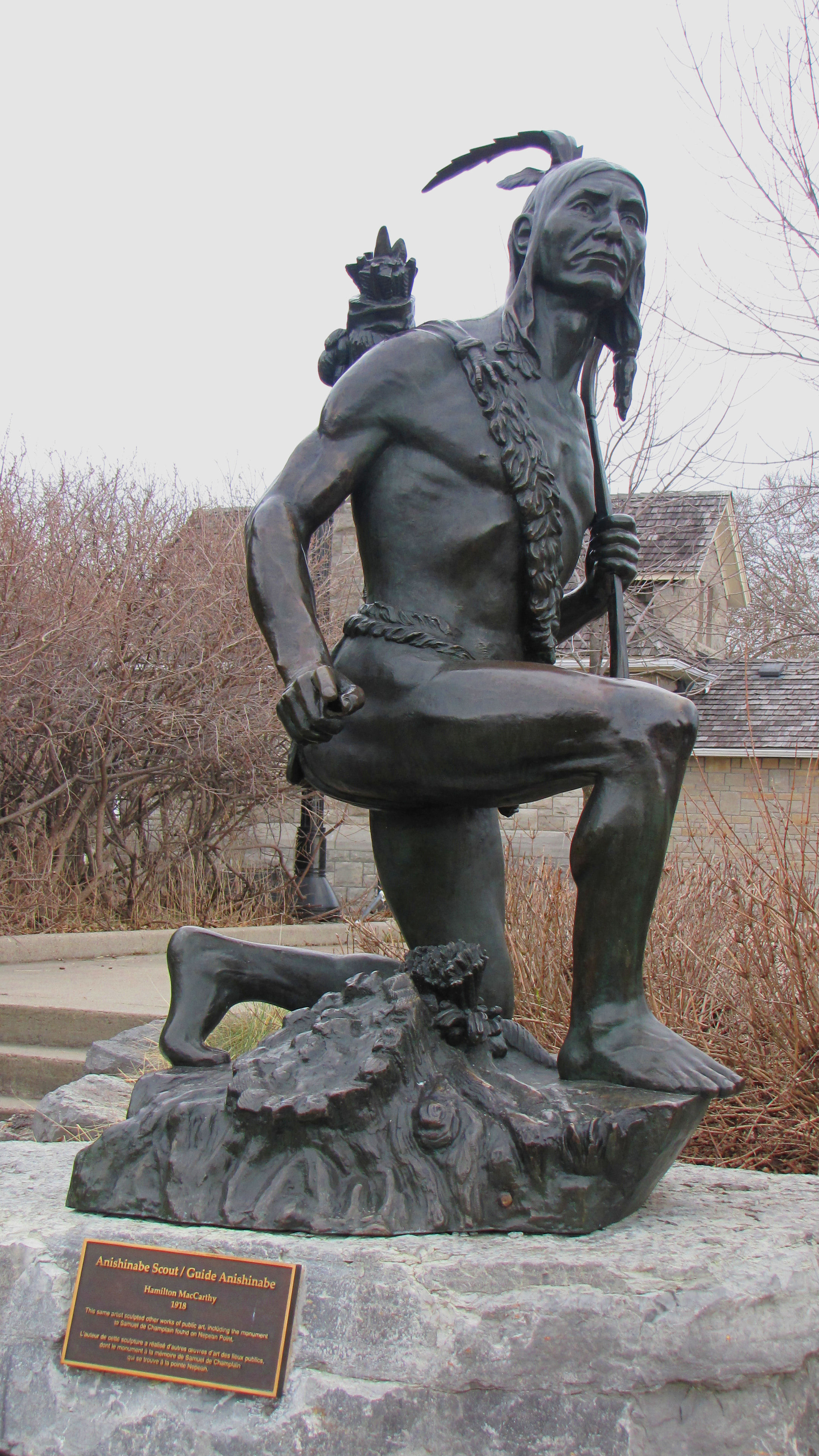
MacCarthy's Kitchi Zibi Omàmìwininì at Major's Hill Park.

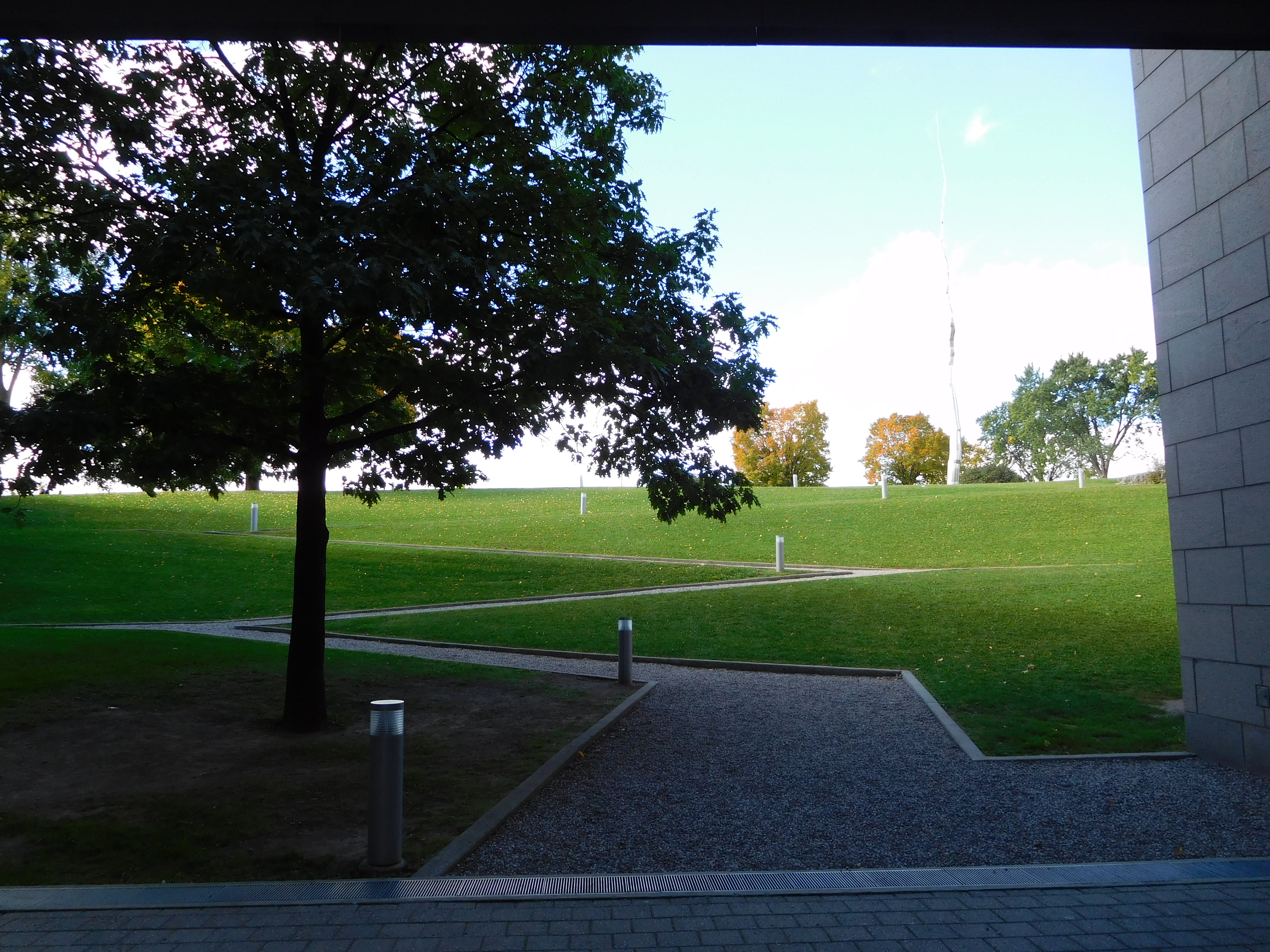
Ascent to Nepean point by Cornelia Oberlander (1988)

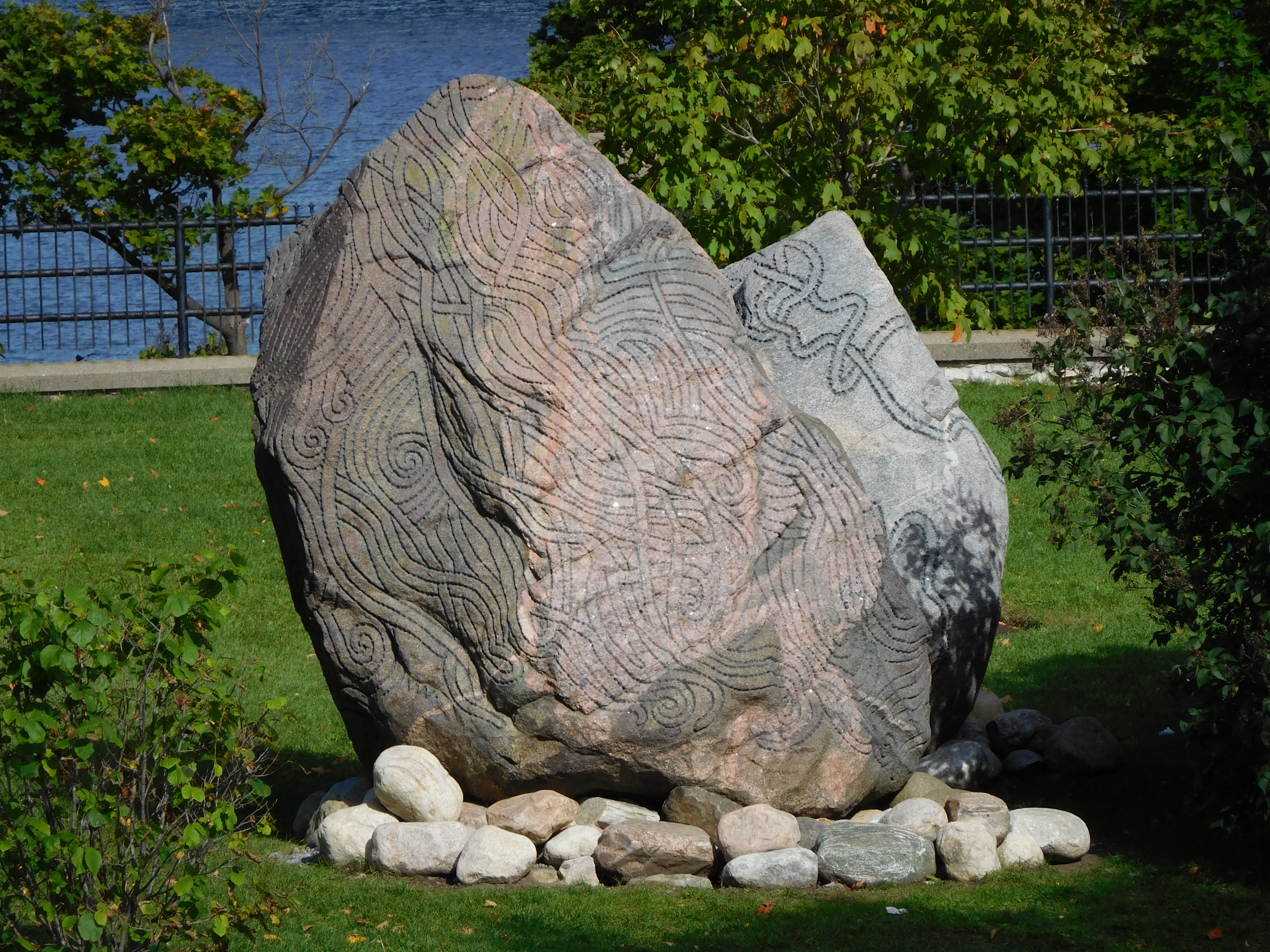
Black Nest by Bill Vazan (1991)

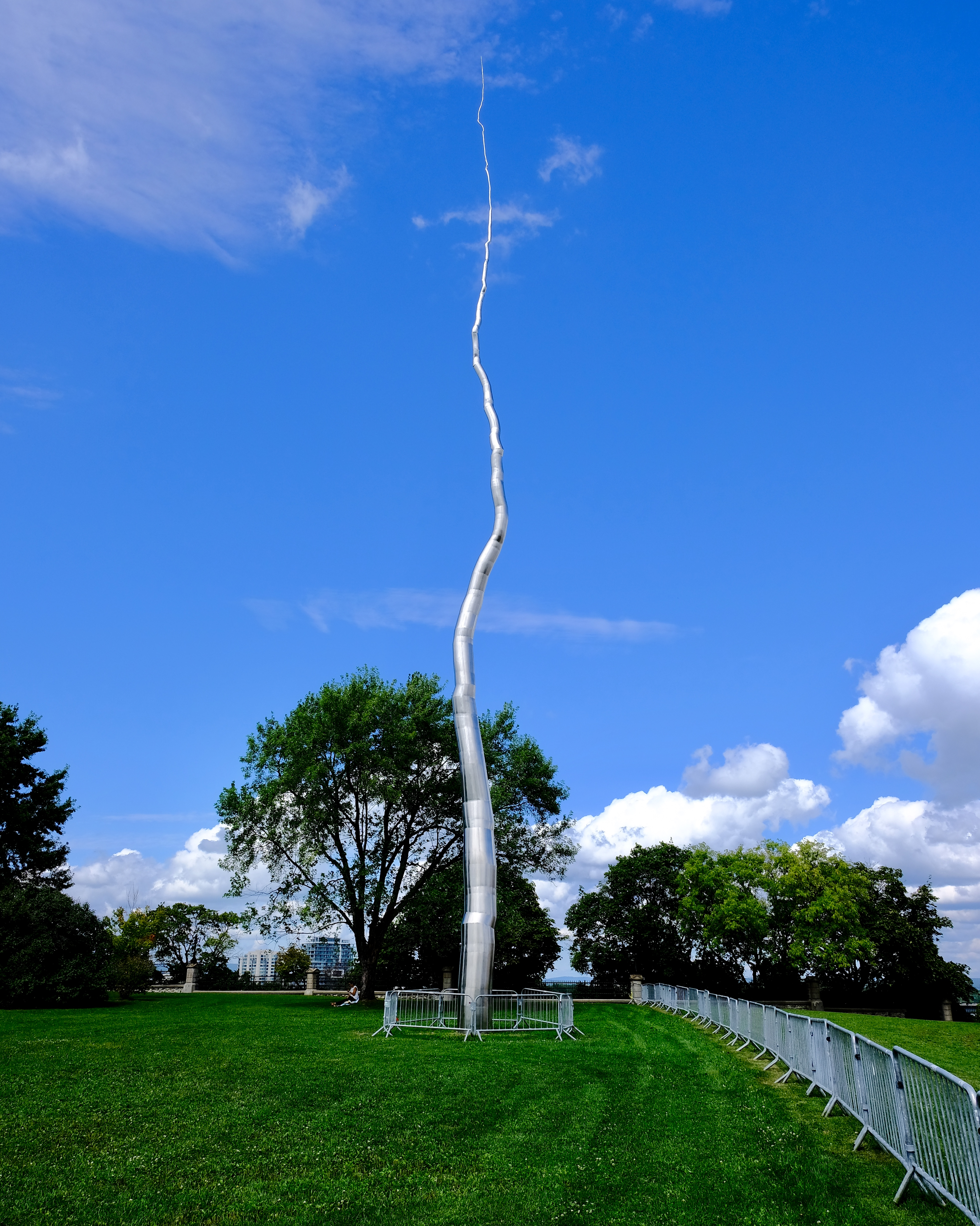
One Hundred Foot Line by Roxy Paine (2010)

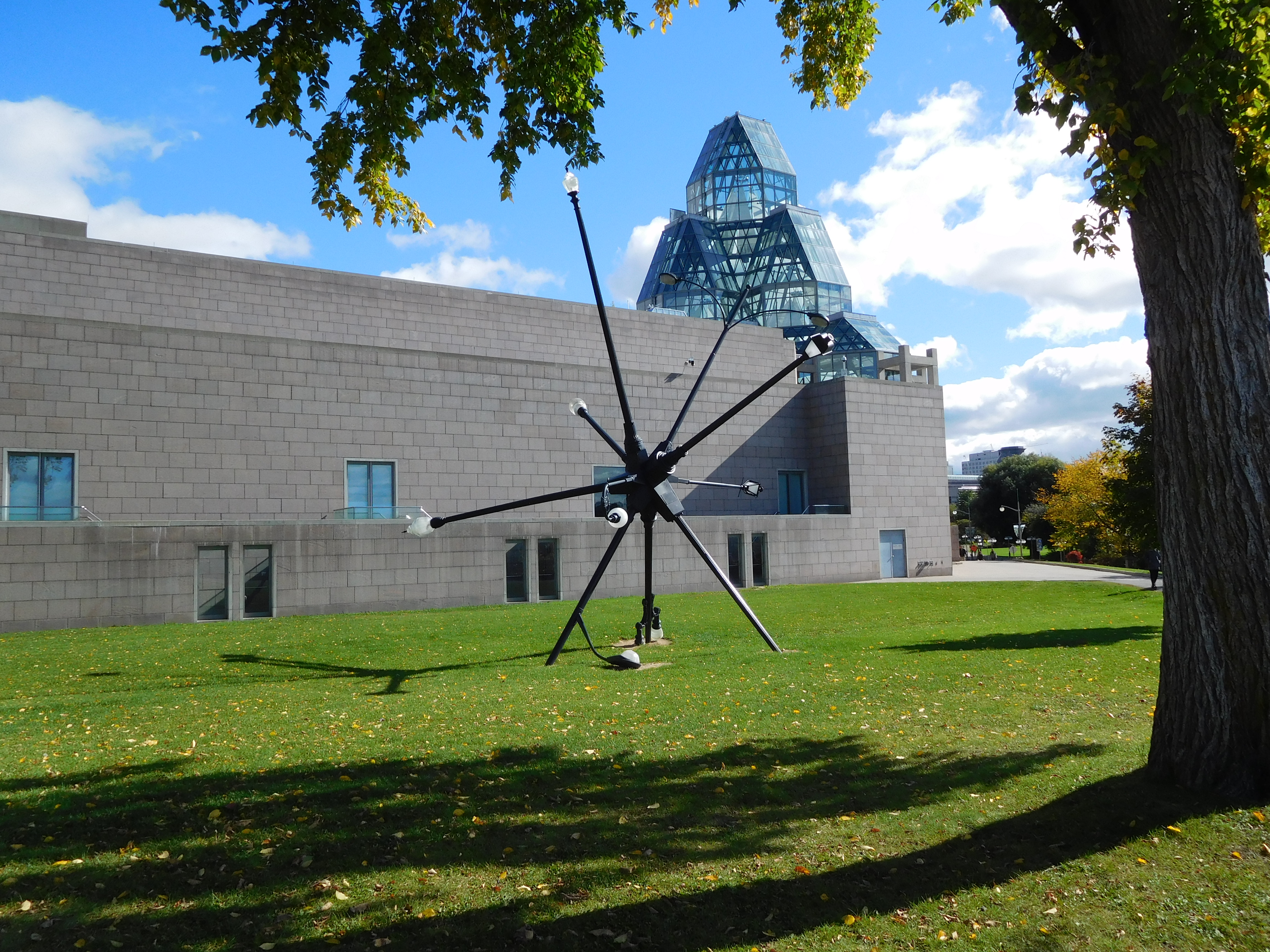
Majestic by Michel de Broin (2011)

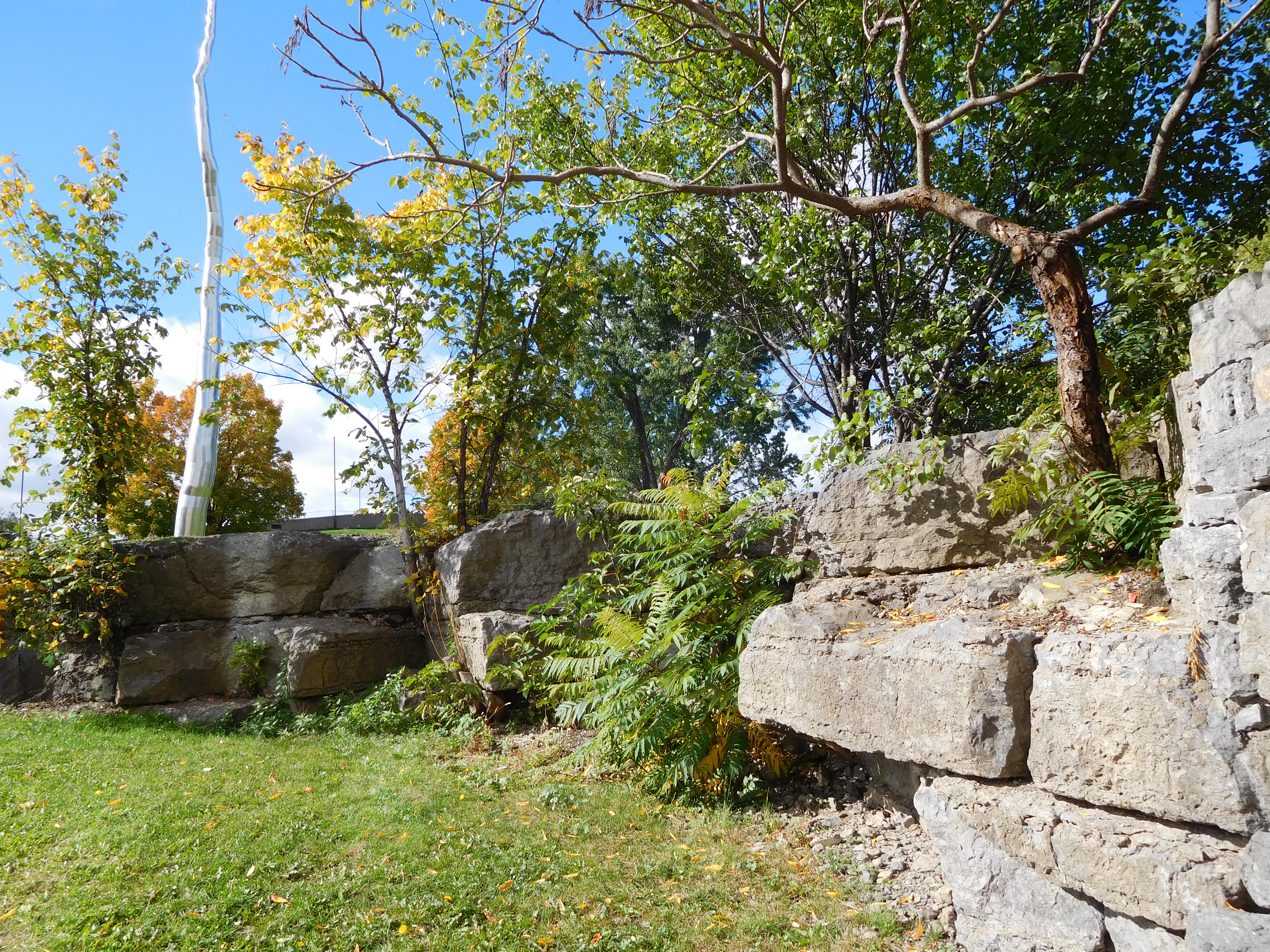
Nature Will Reclaim You by Nicholas Galanin (2013)
