= Kingscote =

Kingscote may refer to:

== Places ==
- Kingscote, South Australia, a town
- Kingscote Airport, airport on Kangaroo Island, South Australia
- Kingscote, Gloucestershire, England
- Kingscote railway station, Sussex, England

== Other uses ==
- Kingscote (surname), a surname
- Kingscote (mansion) in Newport, Rhode Island, United States
- Kingscote Park, Blackpool, a park in Blackpool, England
- Kingscote Park (Gloucestershire), a house near Tetbury, England
- Kingscote School for Girls, fictional school where Antonia Forest's Marlow family are educated
