= North Cape, South Australia =

North Cape
- Town
- Coordinates: 35°34′51″S 137°35′42″E
- Country: Australia
- State: South Australia
- Region: Fleurieu and Kangaroo Island
- LGA: Kangaroo Island Council
- Location: 116 km (72 mi) south-west of Adelaide; 9 km (5.6 mi) north of Kingscote
- Established: 2002

Government
  - State electorate: Mawson
  - Federal division: Mayo

Population
  - Total: 0 (SAL 2021)
- Time zone: UTC+9:30 (ACST)
  - Summer (DST): UTC+10:30 (ACST)
- Postcode: 5223
- County: Carnarvon
- Mean max temp: 198.1 °C (388.6 °F)
- Mean min temp: 11.6 °C (52.9 °F)
- Annual rainfall: 488.9 mm (19.25 in)
Localities around North Cape
Investigator Strait	Investigator Strait	Investigator Strait
Emu Bay	North Cape	Nepean Bay
Bay of Shoals	Bay of Shoals; Nepean Bay	Bay of Shoals (body of water)
- Coordinates; Locations; Climate; Adjoining localities

North Cape is a locality in the Australian state of South Australia located on the north coast of Kangaroo Island overlooking Investigator Strait about 116 kilometres (72 miles) south-west of the state capital of Adelaide and about 9 kilometres (5.6 miles) north of the municipal seat of Kingscote.

Its boundaries were created in March 2002 for the “long established name” which was derived from the most northerly headland on the coastline.

North Cape occupies land bounded by Investigator Strait to the north and by Nepean Bay and its subsidiary, the Bay of Shoals, to the east and the south-east respectively. Its coastline includes features such as Point Marsden and Cape Rouge. Land use is divided between conservation and agriculture with the former applying to the coastline in order to “enhance and conserve the natural features of the coast” and latter applying to land in the locality’s southwest.

The coastline from Point Marsden in the east to Cape D'Estaing in the adjoining locality of Emu Bay in the west is listed on the South Australian Heritage Register as a site of “geological and outstanding palaeontological significance.”

North Cape is located within the federal division of Mayo, the state electoral district of Mawson and the local government area of the Kangaroo Island Council.

== See also ==
- North Cape (disambiguation)
