= Henry Kingscote =

Henry Kingscote may refer to:

- Henry Robert Kingscote (1802–1882), English philanthropist, amateur cricketer, also known for being a founder of the South Australian Company
- Henry Bloomfield Kingscote (1843–1915), his nephew, English soldier and amateur cricketer
