= Kingscote (surname) =

Kingscote is a surname. Notable people with the surname include:

- Algernon Kingscote (1888–1964), British tennis player
- Arthur Kingscote (1841–1881), cricketer, son of Henry Robert and cousin of Henry Bloomfield Kingscote
- Henry Bloomfield Kingscote (1843–1915), soldier and amateur cricketer
- Henry Robert Kingscote (1802–1882), philanthropist and amateur cricketer
- John Kingscote (consecrated 1462), Bishop of Carlisle
- Maurice John Kingscote (1887-1959), British polo champion
- Richard Kingscote (born 1986), British jockey
- Robert Kingscote (1830–1908), soldier and politician
- Thomas Kingscote (1845–1935), courtier
