= Cape North =

Cape North may refer to:

- Cape North (Nova Scotia), Canada, and a small unincorporated area of the same name
- Cape North (South Georgia)
- Cape North (Victoria Land), Antarctica
- Cape Schmidt, Siberia, Russia, formerly named Cape North

== See also ==
- Cape North Lighthouse, Cape North, Nova Scotia
- North Cape (disambiguation)
