= Cassini, South Australia =

Cassini
- Town
- Coordinates: 35.685370°S 137.318750°E
- Country: Australia
- State: South Australia
- Region: Fleurieu and Kangaroo Island
- LGA: Kangaroo Island Council
- Location: 138 km (86 mi) south-west of Adelaide; 31 km (19 mi) west of Kingscote
- Established: 2002

Government
  - State electorate: Mawson
  - Federal division: Mayo

Population
  - Total: 73 (SAL 2021)
- Time zone: UTC+9:30 (ACST)
  - Summer (DST): UTC+10:30 (ACST)
- Postcode: 5223
- County: Carnarvon
- Mean max temp: 21.0 °C (69.8 °F)
- Mean min temp: 8.9 °C (48.0 °F)
- Annual rainfall: 444.0 mm (17.48 in)
Localities around Cassini
Investigator Strait	Investigator Strait	Investigator Strait
Stokes Bay; Duncan	Cassini	Wisanger; Menzies
Duncan	Parndana; Seddon; Kohinoor	Kohinoor
- Distances; Coordinates; Climate; Adjoining localities

Cassini is a locality in the Australian state of South Australia located on the north coast of Kangaroo Island overlooking Investigator Strait about 138 kilometres (86 miles) south-west of the state capital of Adelaide and about 31 kilometres (19 miles) from the municipal seat of Kingscote.

Its boundaries were created in 2002 in respect to "the long established name" which is derived from the cadastral unit of the Hundred of Cassini.

The principal land use is agriculture with a small amount of land being zoned for conservation. The latter use consists of the protected areas of the Lathami Conservation Park and the Parndana Conservation Park, and the strip of land along the coastline.

The locality includes the former Cassini Station Complex and Mulberry Tree which is listed on the South Australian Heritage Register.

The 2016 Australian census which was conducted in August 2016 reports that Cassini had a population of 81 people.

Cassini is located within the federal division of Mayo, the state electoral district of Mawson and the local government area of the Kangaroo Island Council.

== See also ==
- Cassini (disambiguation)
