= Bay of Shoals, South Australia =

Bay of Shoals
- Town
- Coordinates: 35.606440°S 137.565920°E
- Country: Australia
- State: South Australia
- Region: Fleurieu and Kangaroo Island
- LGA: Kangaroo Island Council
- Location: 121 km (75 mi) south-west of Adelaide; 7 km (4.3 mi) north of Kingscote
- Established: 2002

Government
  - State electorate: Mawson
  - Federal division: Mayo

Population
  - Total: 30 (SAL 2021)
- Time zone: UTC+9:30 (ACST)
  - Summer (DST): UTC+10:30 (ACST)
- Postcode: 5223
- County: Carnarvon
- Mean max temp: 19.8 °C (67.6 °F)
- Mean min temp: 11.6 °C (52.9 °F)
- Annual rainfall: 488.9 mm (19.25 in)
Localities around Bay of Shoals
Emu Bay	Emu Bay; North Cape	North Cape
Wisanger	Bay of Shoals	Bay of Shoals (body of water)
Wisanger	Wisanger	Bay of Shoals (body of water)
- Coordinates; Locations; Climate; Adjoining localities

Bay of Shoals is a locality in the Australian state of South Australia located on the north coast of Kangaroo Island overlooking the Bay of Shoals about 121 kilometres (75 miles) south-west of the state capital of Adelaide and about 7 kilometres (4.3 miles) north of the municipal seat of Kingscote.

Its boundaries were created in March 2002 for the "long established name" which was derived from the adjoining bay. The locality occupies land on the western shore line of the Bay of Shoals.

The principal land use is agriculture while a strip of land along the coastline is zoned for conservation in order to "enhance and conserve the natural features of the coast."

Bay of Shoals is located within the federal division of Mayo, the state electoral district of Mawson and the local government area of the Kangaroo Island Council.
