= Cygnet Estuary Conservation Park =

Protected area in South Australia

- IUCN category III (natural monument or feature)
- Location within South Australia
- Location: South Australia
- Nearest city: Kingscote
- Coordinates: 35°40′46″S 137°35′29″E
- Area: 1.39 km^{2} (0.54 sq mi)
- Established: 6 February 2014
- Governing body: Department for Environment and Water

Cygnet Estuary Conservation Park is a protected area located on the west coast of Nepean Bay on Kangaroo Island in South Australia about 5 kilometres (3.1 miles) west southwest of Kingscote. It was proclaimed under the National Parks and Wildlife Act 1972 in 2014 on the basis that some existing crown land 'should be protected and preserved for the purpose of conserving any wildlife and the natural features of the land'. The Cygnet Estuary which is considered to be a significant wetland is located within the boundaries of the conservation park.

== See also ==
- Cygnet River
- Cygnet River, South Australia
