= Kohinoor, South Australia =

Kohinoor
- Town
- Coordinates: 35.760360°S 137.404590°E
- Country: Australia
- State: South Australia
- Region: Fleurieu and Kangaroo Island
- LGA: Kangaroo Island Council
- Location: 137 km (85 mi) south-west of Adelaide; 20 km (12 mi) south-east of Kingscote
- Established: 2002

Government
  - State electorate: Mawson
  - Federal division: Mayo

Population
  - Total: 39 (SAL 2021)
- Time zone: UTC+9:30 (ACST)
  - Summer (DST): UTC+10:30 (ACST)
- Postcode: 5223
- County: County of Carnarvon
- Mean max temp: 21.0 °C (69.8 °F)
- Mean min temp: 9.0 °C (48.2 °F)
- Annual rainfall: 444.0 mm (17.48 in)
Localities around Kohinoor
Cassini	Cassini; Menzies; Cygnet River	Cygnet River
Seddon	Kohinoor	Birchmore
Seddon	Birchmore; MacGillivray	Birchmore
- Coordinates; Locations; Climate; Adjoining localities

Kohinoor is a locality in the Australian state of South Australia located on Kangaroo Island about 137 kilometres (85 miles) south-west of the state capital of Adelaide and about 20 kilometres (12 miles) south-east of the municipal seat of Kingscote.

Its boundaries were created in March 2002 for the “long established name” which was derived from Kohinoor Hill, a hill located within the locality’s boundaries.

Kohinoor is bounded in part by the Playford Highway to the north. The principal land use in the locality is primary production.

Kohinoor is located within the federal division of Mayo, the state electoral district of Mawson and the local government area of the Kangaroo Island Council.

== See also ==
- Kohinoor (disambiguation)
