= Emu Bay =

Emu Bay may refer to

- Emu Bay (South Australia), a bay
  - Emu Bay, South Australia, a locality
  - Emu Bay Shale, a geological formation associated with the above locality
- Emu Bay (Tasmanian geographic feature), on the northwest coast
  - Burnie, Tasmania, formerly Emu Bay
  - City of Burnie, formerly the Municipality of Emu Bay
  - Emu Bay Railway
  - The Advocate (Tasmania), formerly the Emu Bay Times
