= Emu Bay, South Australia =

Emu Bay
- Town
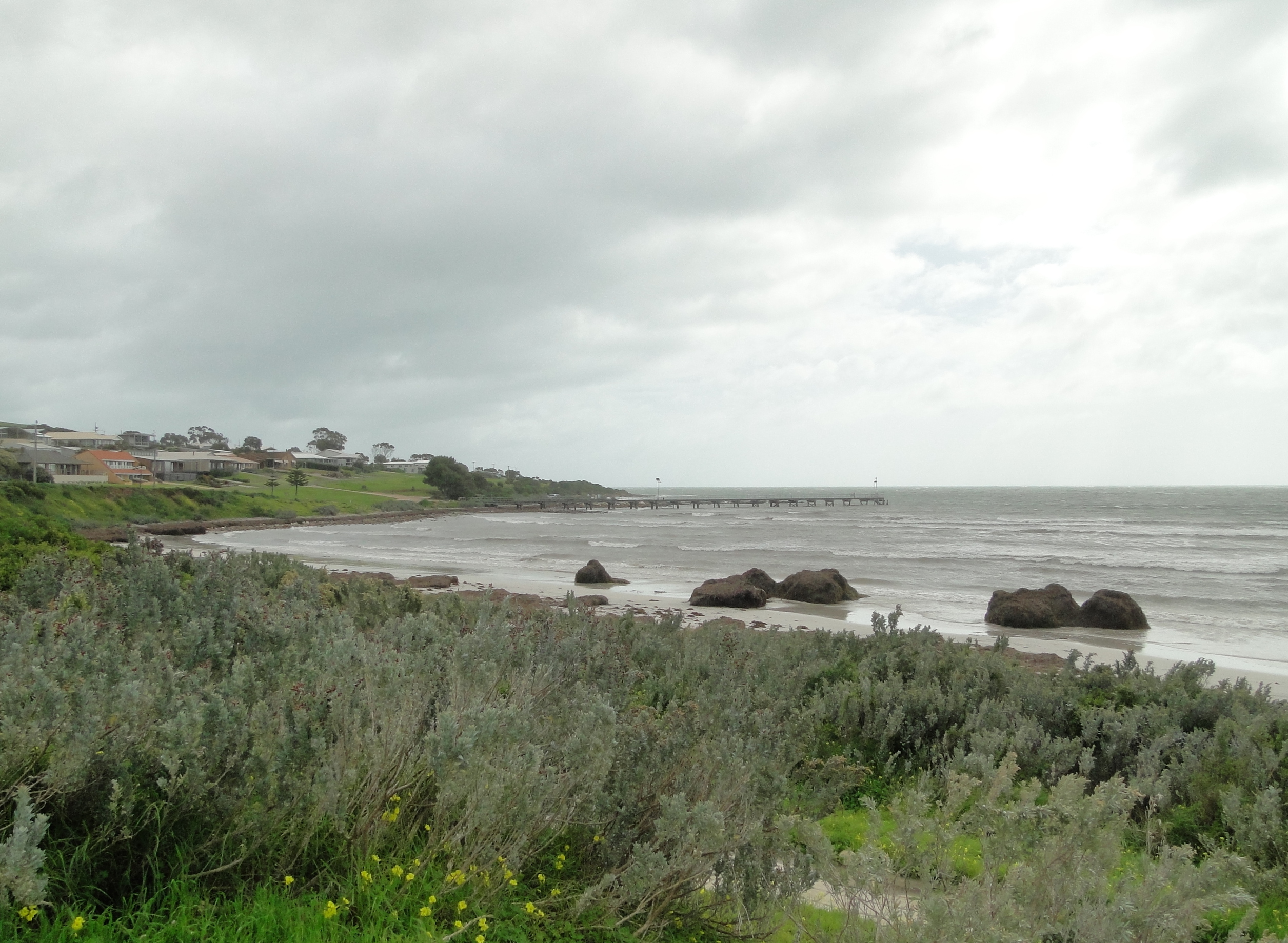
- View of Emu Bay and jetty from the picnic area.

- Coordinates: 35.59067069°S 137.50374797°E
- Country: Australia
- State: South Australia
- Region: Fleurieu and Kangaroo Island
- LGA: Kangaroo Island Council
- Location: 124 km (77 mi) south-west of Adelaide; 13 km (8.1 mi) west of Kingscote
- Established: 1882

Government
  - State electorate: Mawson
  - Federal division: Mayo

Population
  - Total: 95 (SAL 2021)
- Time zone: UTC+9:30 (ACST)
  - Summer (DST): UTC+10:30 (ACST)
- Postcode: 5223
- County: Carnarvon
- Mean max temp: 19.81 °C (67.66 °F)
- Mean min temp: 11.6 °C (52.9 °F)
- Annual rainfall: 488.9 mm (19.25 in)
Localities around Emu Bay
| Investigator Strait | Investigator Strait | Investigator Strait |
| Wisanger | Emu Bay | North Cape |
| Wisanger | Wisanger | Bay of Shoals |
- Coordinates; Locations; Climate; Adjoining localities

Emu Bay (known as Maxwell from 1882 to 1941) is a locality in the Australian state of South Australia on the north coast of Kangaroo Island located about 124 kilometres (77 mi) south-west of the state capital of Adelaide and about located about 13 kilometres (8.1 mi) west of the municipal seat of Kingscote.

It is a small town of 97 allotments with an even mix of permanent and holiday homes. The town has no shops or mains water supply. Emu Bay is known as a popular swimming beach, and is one of few on Kangaroo Island where vehicles are permitted.

A small jetty dates to 1918. Originally 109 metres (358 ft) long, it allowed ketches such as Karatta to tie up to load cargoes, while a nearby fresh water well serviced horses which pulled wagons down to the bay. Until the 1930s, grain, stock and merchandise were taken to and from Kangaroo Island from this jetty.

Emu Bay is also the location of an unusual geological formation named Emu Bay Shale.

The coastline from Cape D'Estaing at the west end of the bay known as Emu Bay to Point Marsden in the locality of North Cape in the east is listed on the South Australian Heritage Register as a site of “geological and outstanding palaeontological significance".

Emu Bay is located within the federal division of Mayo, the state electoral district of Mawson and the local government area of the Kangaroo Island Council.

== Gallery ==
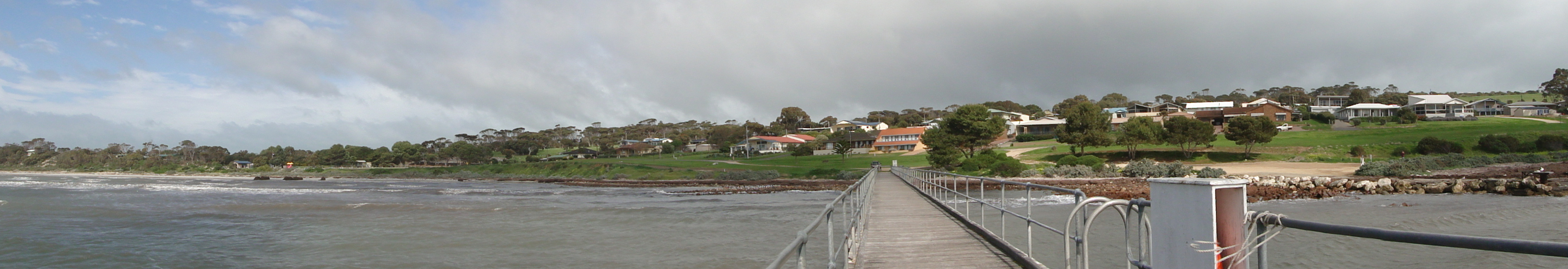
Emu Bay from the jetty, Kangaroo Island, South Australia
