= Kohinoor (disambiguation) =

Kohinoor most commonly refers to the Koh-i-Noor, a 105.6 metric carats diamond, weighing 21.6 g, once the largest known diamond.

Kohinoor may also refer to:

== Companies ==
- Koh-i-Noor Hardtmuth, a writing instrument manufacturer
- Kohinoor Film Company, an Indian film studio established in 1918
- Kohinoor Group or Saigol Group, a Pakistani conglomerate

== Media ==
- Kohinoor (1960 film), a 1960 Bollywood film
- Kohinoor (Nepali film), a 2014 Nepali action-drama film
- Kohinoor (2015 film), a Malayalam film
- Kohinoor (2024 film), a 2024 Indian Bengali-language science fiction film
- Kohinoor Theatre, a mobile theatre from Assam
- Kohinoor (TV series), a 2005 Indian television series
- Koh-i-Noor: The History of the World's Most Infamous Diamond, a 2017 non-fiction history book about the diamond
- The Kohinoor, a 19th century Bengali newspaper
- Kolkatay Kohinoor, a 2019 Indian film about the diamond
- Kohinoor Karan, a fictional Indian superhero from the 1998 film Maharaja

== Places ==
- Kohinoor, South Australia, a locality in the Kangaroo Island Council
- Koh-I-Noor railway station, Sheikhupura District, Punjab, Pakistan
- Kohinoor Asiana Hotel now Elite Grand Hotel, Chennai, India

== Other uses ==
- Amathuxidia amythaon, a kind of butterfly found in Asia, also known as koh-i-noor
