= Birchmore, South Australia =

Birchmore
- Town
- Coordinates: 35.7956°S 137.476880°E
- Country: Australia
- State: South Australia
- Region: Fleurieu and Kangaroo Island
- LGA: Kangaroo Island Council
- Location: 138 km (86 mi) south-west of Adelaide; 20 km (12 mi) south-east of Kingscote
- Established: 2002

Government
  - State electorate: Mawson
  - Federal division: Mayo

Population
  - Total: 49 (SAL 2021)
- Time zone: UTC+9:30 (ACST)
  - Summer (DST): UTC+10:30 (ACST)
- Postcode: 5223
- County: County of Carnarvon
- Mean max temp: 21.0 °C (69.8 °F)
- Mean min temp: 9.0 °C (48.2 °F)
- Annual rainfall: 444.0 mm (17.48 in)
Localities around Birchmore
Cygnet River	Cygnet River	Cygnet River
Kohinoor; MacGillivray	Birchmore	MacGillivray
MacGillivray	MacGillivray	MacGillivray
- Coordinates; Locations; Climate; Adjoining localities

Birchmore is a locality in the Australian state of South Australia located on Kangaroo Island about 138 kilometres (86 miles) south-west of the state capital of Adelaide and about 20 kilometres (12 miles) south-east of the municipal seat of Kingscote.

Its boundaries were created in May 2002 for the “long established name” which was derived from the Birchmore Community Hall, a facility located within the locality’s boundaries.

The principal land use in the locality is primary production.

Birchmore is located within the federal division of Mayo, the state electoral district of Mawson and the local government area of the Kangaroo Island Council.
