= North Cape =

North Cape, Northern Cape, or Nordkapp may refer to:

== Places ==
=== Norway ===
- North Cape (Norway), a cape at the northernmost part of Magerøya island in Nordkapp Municipality in Finnmark county, Norway
- Nordkapp Municipality, a municipality in Finnmark county, Norway
- Nordkapp (Bjørnøya), the northernmost point of Bear island in Arctic Norway
- Nordkapp (Jan Mayen), the northernmost point of Jan Mayen island, Norway
- Nordkapp (Nordaustlandet), the northernmost point of Nordaustlandet island in the Svalbard archipelago, Norway

=== Other places ===
- North Cape (Prince Edward Island), a cape at the northwesternmost extremity of Prince Edward Island, Canada
- North Cape (New Zealand), a cape at the northern end of the North Auckland Peninsula in the North Island, New Zealand
- Noordkaap (Netherlands), the northernmost point of mainland Netherlands
- North Cape, Wisconsin, an unincorporated community in Racine County, Wisconsin, United States
- North Cape, South Australia, a locality on Kangaroo Island in Australia
- The North Cape, a fictional location in J. R. R. Tolkien's writings associated with Middle-earth

== Ships ==
- HNoMS Nordcap, 1840 ship of the Royal Norwegian Navy
- HNoMS Nordkapp, 1937 ship of the Royal Norwegian Navy
- NoCGV Nordkapp (1964) of the Royal Norwegian Navy and later Coast Guard
- Nordkapp-class offshore patrol vessel, 1980 class of the Norwegian Coast Guard
  - NoCGV Nordkapp (1980) lead vessel of said class
- MS Nordkapp, 1996 cruiseferry of the Norwegian Coastal Express (Hurtigruten)
- North Cape oil spill, a barge which ran aground in Rhode Island, United States, in 1996, causing a major environmental incident

== Other ==
- Battle of the North Cape, a Second World War naval battle
- Capo Nord (album), a 1980 album by Alice

== See also ==
- Cabo Norte, Cabo do Norte, or Cape de Nord, the northwestern point of the Amazon delta
- Cabo Norte, a captaincy of the former Viceroyalty of Brazil
- Northern Cape, a province of South Africa
- Cape North (disambiguation)
