= Scott Portelli =

Australian scuba diver

Scott Portelli is an underwater photographer and nature photographer from Mosman, New South Wales, Australia. Portelli won numerous national and international nature photography awards between 2015 and 2020 and is best known for his underwater images of whales and dolphins.

== Career ==
Portelli took up photography in his twenties after extensive travelling. His nature photography reflects species and locations found in the Galapagos, Antarctica, the Arctic, the South Pacific and Africa, where he has been conducting commercial photography expeditions since 2007. Circa 2017, he was taking expeditions to Antarctica, the Falkland Islands, Rwanda, Tonga and Norway.

Portelli studies animal behavior to learn their warning signals prior to undertaking a shoot with a potentially dangerous subject. His work documenting Humpback whale behavior appears in the 2020 documentary film Swimming with Gentle Giants by Stephan Andrews. He first began swimming with whales in Tonga circa 2003. Portelli is also a licensed drone pilot.

== Personal life ==
Portelli is married to Rosie Leaney. The couple honeymooned at Kangaroo Island, South Australia in 2018 where they dived at Smith Bay.
