= Parndana Conservation Park =

Protected area in South Australia

- IUCN category III (natural monument or feature)
- Location within South Australia
- Location: South Australia
- Nearest city: Parndana,
- Coordinates: 35°45′30″S 137°19′45″E
- Area: 625 ha (1,540 acres)
- Established: 26 September 1968
- Governing body: Department of Environment, Water and Natural Resources

Parndana Conservation Park (formerly Parndana National Park) is a protected area in South Australia located on Kangaroo Island. It was dedicated in 1968 for the protection of remnant native vegetation.

== Description ==
The conservation park has an area of 580 hectares (1,400 acres) and is located in the locality of Cassini about 7 kilometres (4.3 mi) north-east of the town of Parndana in the central part of the island, about 30 kilometres (19 mi) west of Kingscote. The conservation park is classified as an IUCN Category III protected area.

== Flora and fauna ==
Most of the area of the conservation park carries low open forest and shrubland featuring Eucalyptus baxteri and E. cosmophylla over Allocasuarina muelleriana, Banksia marginata, B. ornata, Xanthorrhoea tateana, Leptospermum myrsinoides and Hakea sp. Some areas along drainage lines have an open forest or woodland of E. cladocalyx over Acacia paradoxa. The conservation park provides feeding and nesting habitat for glossy black cockatoos.

== See also ==
- Protected areas of South Australia
