= Kangaroo Island Pioneers Association =

The Kangaroo Island Pioneers Association is a not-for-profit history organisation in South Australia.

Established in 1984, the Kangaroo Island Pioneer Association (K.I.P.A.) is committed to determining, preserving and promoting Kangaroo Island’s rich pioneer history. It seeks to honour the presence and achievements of the pioneers in the establishment of the Colony of South Australia.

Membership is open to anyone who is a descendant of pioneers who arrived or settled prior to, or after the establishment of the first settlement on 27 July 1836; soldier settlers and their descendants; and all persons interested in exploring and promoting Kangaroo Island's history.

One of its objectives is to research, interpret and publicise the history behind the Old Mulberry Tree at Reeves Point, the ship "Duke of York" and other early immigrant ships. It also aims to encourage restoration work in the Pioneer Cemetery at Kingscote, Kangaroo Island. It is instrumental in the organisation of the Settlement Day ceremonies at Reeves Point on 27 July each year.

The Kangaroo Island Pioneers Association is registered as a non-profit charitable organisation and is aligned with the History Trust of South Australia.

Projects in the past have included the identification of unmarked graves at Penneshaw Cemetery in November 2014.

The Hon. Vickie Chapman, the Deputy Premier and Attorney General of South Australia, is a patron. She was born on Kangaroo Island and frequently visits her family farm.
