= Cygnet River, South Australia =

Cygnet River
- Town
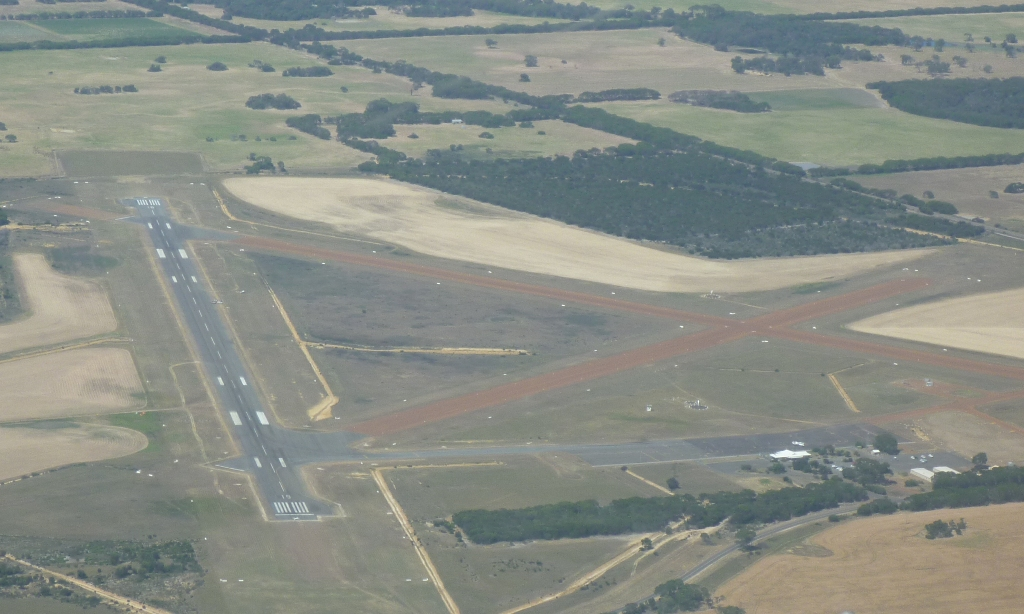
- Kingscote Airport and the adjoining land use as viewed from the north

- Coordinates: 35.698280°S 137.519580°E
- Country: Australia
- State: South Australia
- Region: Fleurieu and Kangaroo Island
- LGA: Kangaroo Island Council
- Location: 130 km (81 mi) south-west of Adelaide; 12 km (7.5 mi) south of Kingscote
- Established: 2002

Government
  - State electorate: Mawson
  - Federal division: Mayo
- Elevation: 6 m (20 ft)

Population
  - Total: 72 (SAL 2021)
- Time zone: UTC+9:30 (ACST)
  - Summer (DST): UTC+10:30 (ACST)
- Postcode: 5223
- County: Carnarvon
- Mean max temp: 21.0 °C (69.8 °F)
- Mean min temp: 8.9 °C (48.0 °F)
- Annual rainfall: 444.0 mm (17.48 in)
Localities around Cygnet River
| Menzies | Menzies; Wisanger; Kingscote | Brownlow KI |
| Kohinoor | Cygnet River | Nepean Bay (water body) |
| Kohinoor | Kohinoor; Birchmore; MacGillivray | Nepean Bay |
- Distances; Coordinates; Climate; Adjoining localities

Cygnet River is a locality on Kangaroo Island in the Australian state of South Australia, about 192 kilometres (119 miles) south-west of the state capital of Adelaide and about 12 kilometres (7.5 miles) from the municipal seat of Kingscote.

Its boundaries were created in 2002 in respect to “the long established name” which is reported to be derived from the stream located within its boundaries.

Cygnet River is located within the federal division of Mayo, the state electoral district of Mawson and the local government area of the Kangaroo Island Council.

== Land use ==
The major land use within the locality is primary production. The locality also includes the Kingscote Airport and the Cygnet Estuary Conservation Park.

Cygnet River contains the following places listed on the South Australian Heritage Register:

- Farm and Eucalyptus Oil Distillery Ruins, Duck Lagoon
- Dwelling & Eucalyptus Oil Distillery Ruins (Cygnet River)

== River ==
The locality of Cygnet River is named for the watercourse also named Cygnet River. It is the longest river on Kangaroo Island. They are named after Cygnet, which was the fifth ship to arrive in South Australia in 1836. The river empties via a delta on the western shore of Western Cove, part of Nepean Bay. It was previously named "Three Well River" and the location of Henry Wallen's farm, then (briefly) Morgan River, after Robert Clark Morgan, the captain of Duke of York, first of the First Fleet of South Australia to arrive.

== See also ==
- List of rivers of Australia § South Australia
