= Smith Bay, South Australia =

Bay on the coast of Kangaroo Island in South Australia

Smith
- Location in South Australia
- Coordinates: 35°35′S 137°27′E
- Type: Bay
- Part of: Investigator Strait
- Basin countries: Australia

Smith Bay is a bay on the north coast of Kangaroo Island in South Australia. It lies west of Cape D'Estaing and is accessible from land in the locality of Wisanger via the North Coast Road. Smith Creek empties into the western end of the bay. Between 2014 and 2021 it was the site of a proposed port for the export of timber and receipt of passenger and cargo vessels. Yumbah Aquaculture has been commercially producing abalone by drawing water and returning it to the bay since 1995. Smith Bay lies within a Mission Blue Hope Spot that was declared in 2020 and encompasses the north coast of Kangaroo Island.

== Port Proposal ==
Feasibility studies into the prospect of constructing a port at Smith Bay were commissioned and published by Kangaroo Island Plantation Timber in 2014. In 2017, it was declared a Major Development by the Government of South Australia. The port was planned to accommodate timber loading, passenger vessels and general cargo vessels at a floating pontoon in water 10 metres deep. The pontoon was to be connected to the shore via a 250 metre long causeway which would support vehicle traffic for the conveyance of tourists. The company's Environmental Impact Statement was expected to be lodged in the last quarter of 2018. Mitsui was expecting to construct and operate woodchip loading facilities at the port site if the development proceeds.

=== Response ===
Critics of the proposal expressed concern about the potential impacts of basin dredging, and have claimed that work conducted in preparation of the EIS may have impacted fishing grounds, scarred the seabed and resulted in seagrass loss. Conservationists have claimed that drilling operations in the bay related to the port project "chased" a Southern right whale and her calf out of the bay. The claim was refuted by Kangaroo Island Plantation Timber, who said that the whales left the area before drilling commenced.

Yumbah Aquaculture expressed concern about the potential impact port construction and operation could have on their onshore abalone business, which circulates water to and from the bay for its operational use. Concerns include the mobilisation of sediment "choking" their stock, the importation of invasive species to the area and the impact of a built causeway on local water temperature to which abalone are sensitive.

=== Outcome ===
In August 2021, the proposal was officially rejected by the Government of South Australia, citing a variety of environmental and economic reasons including biosecurity and impacts to local businesses and the island's "character".
