= Old Mulberry Tree at Reeves Point =

Old Mulberry Tree
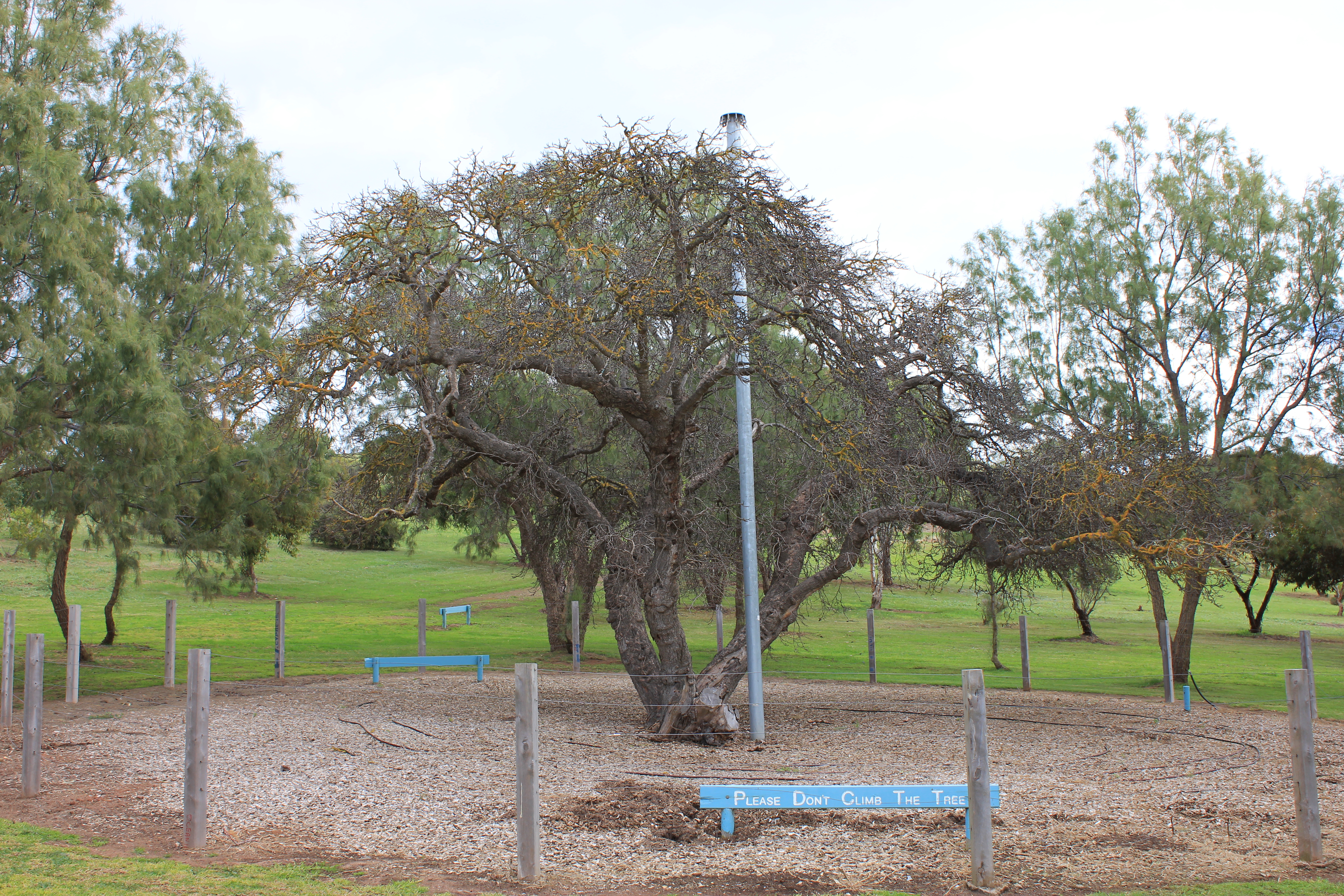
- A tree considered to be the oldest surviving fruit tree in South Australia

- Location in South Australia
- 35°38′36″S 137°38′24″E
- Location: Kingscote, Kangaroo Island, South Australia, Australia

Old Mulberry Tree at Reeves Point is a tree in the Australian state of South Australia located at Reeves Point in Kingscote on Kangaroo Island. The tree, which was planted as early as 1836, probably by Charles Binden Powell, is associated with the first official European settlement of South Australia and is the oldest surviving fruit tree in the state.

== History ==
=== Who planted the tree? ===
Controversy remains as to the person who planted the mulberry tree, and when.

Some believe the tree was planted some time in 1837 and is all that is left of an orchard planted by Johann Menge (1788-1852), South Australia's first geologist.

The descendants of Friedrich Kleeman lay claim to the first planting. Friedrich's wife, Maria née Helm died the day before the arrival of the Solway on 16 October 1837 and her remains were brought ashore and buried. An obituary notice of Friedericke Wilhelmine Till (Friedrich's daughter) who died in 1928 stated that her mother was buried in the Old Cemetery at Kingscote, near the Mulberry Tree, which was brought out by the Kleeman family from Germany. Other newspaper reports in 1936 state that Mrs Kleeman was buried where the Mulberry Tree stands, the tree being planted on her grave.

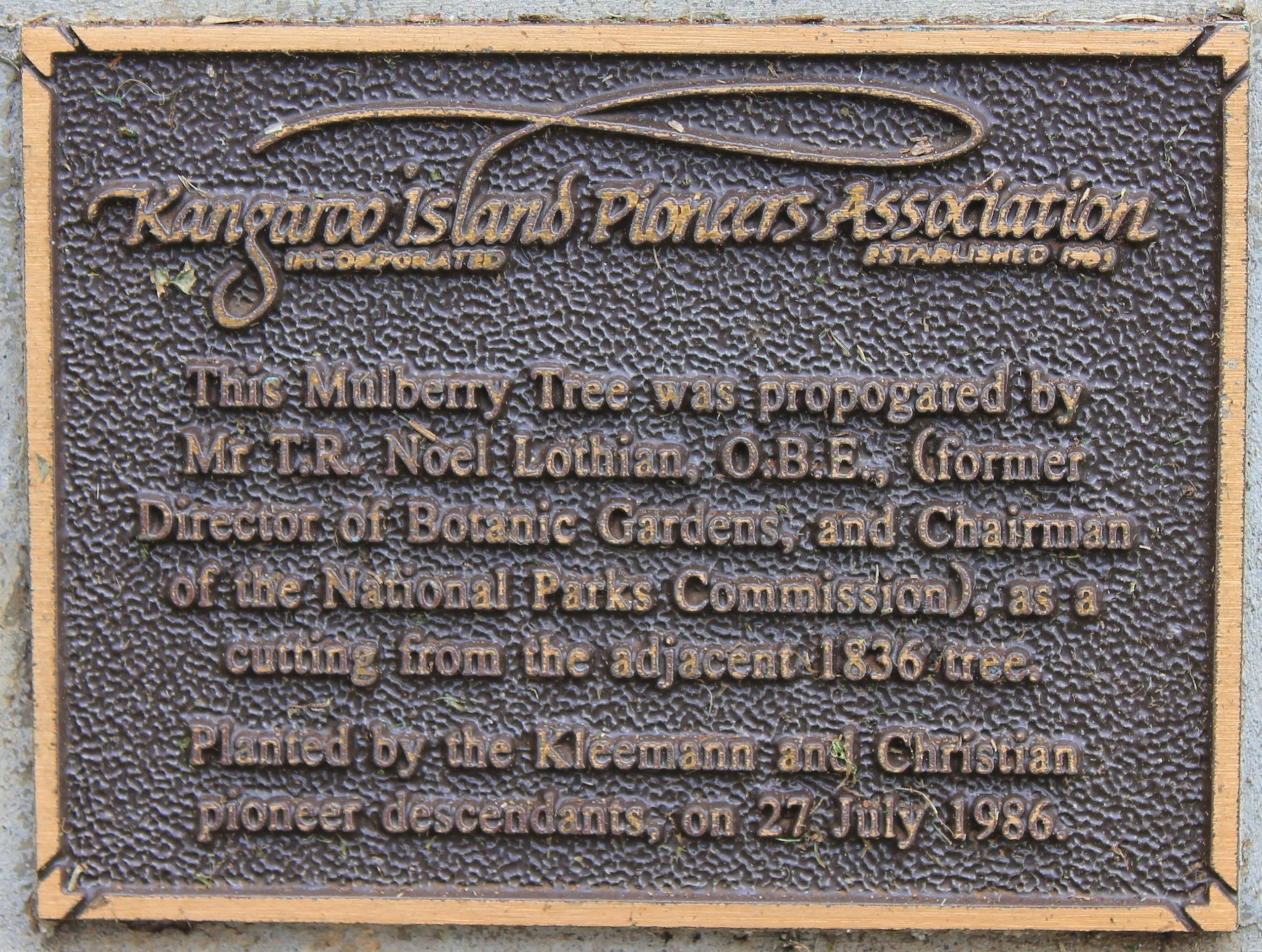
The Kangaroo Island Pioneers Association commemorated in 1986 the planting of a progeny of the adjacent original mulberry tree, by the Christian and Kleeman pioneer family descendants.

Descendants of Johann Christian (c.1808-1888) who also arrived on the Solway, claim from their family history that he planted the tree, and that he buried his wife Karoline (c.1851-1849) at the base of the tree. Some consider this unlikely as the nearby Kangaroo Island Pioneers Cemetery had already been in use for the past 12 years.

The descendants of Charles George Everard (1794-1876), who arrived on the Africaine, claim that he was responsible for planting the first mulberry tree, brought from the Cape of Good Hope, although lamenting that it was cut down, which would confirm that there was more than one mulberry tree.

Descendants of Thomas Hudson Beare (1792-1861), who arrived on the Duke of York, lay claim to the first planting, although it is likely that he instructed the South Australian Company gardener, Charles Binden Powell (1810-1898), who also arrived on the Duke of York, to do the planting, which probably occurred within a few days after the arrival of the Duke of York on 27 July 1836.

=== Poetry ===
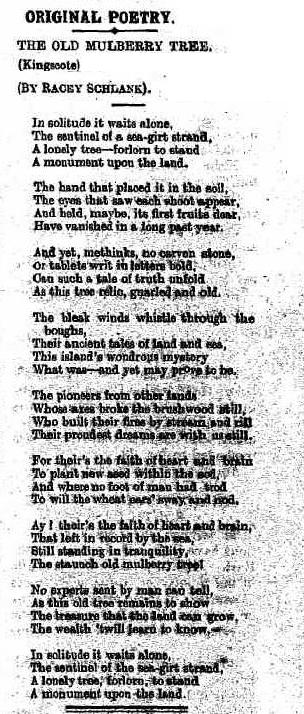
Poem about an historic mulberry tree at Reeves Point, Kangaroo Island

A poem by "Racey Schlank" was published in 1911

=== Preservation ===
Concerns were expressed for the health of the tree as early as 1915, and several attempts to preserve the tree since, including a professional arborist engaged by the Kangaroo Island Council, have proved successful. It is considered that it may survive for 500 years. Visitors to the historic site will see that the old tree has been propped up by a support system of cables and poles.

== The tree today ==
=== The continuing productivity of the tree ===
The tree is still bearing fruit, and cuttings have been propagated and planted nearby and in other parts of South Australia with mixed success. One planted adjacent by the Kleemann and Christian pioneer descendants, on 27 July 1986, continues to thrive.

=== Symbolism ===
Due to its historical significance, the mulberry tree at Reeves Point is considered to be a living testament to the tenacious spirit of the early pioneers of South Australia. It is depicted in the logo of the Kangaroo Island Pioneers Association.

=== Heritage listing ===
The tree is a feature of a site which was listed on the South Australian Heritage Register on 1 September 1983 for being the "site of the first official settlement in the Colony".
