= Menzies, South Australia =

Menzies
- Town
- Coordinates: 35.695710°S 137.433970°E
- Country: Australia
- State: South Australia
- Region: Fleurieu and Kangaroo Island
- LGA: Kangaroo Island Council
- Location: 136 km (85 mi) south-west of Adelaide; 19 km (12 mi) west of Kingscote
- Established: 2002

Government
  - State electorate: Mawson
  - Federal division: Mayo

Population
  - Total: 83 (SAL 2021)
- Time zone: UTC+9:30 (ACST)
  - Summer (DST): UTC+10:30 (ACST)
- Postcode: 5223
- County: Carnarvon
- Mean max temp: 21.0 °C (69.8 °F)
- Mean min temp: 9.0 °C (48.2 °F)
- Annual rainfall: 444.0 mm (17.48 in)
Localities around Menzies
Cassini	Wisanger	Wisanger; Kingscote
Cassini	Menzies	Cygnet River
Kohinoor	Kohinoor	Cygnet River
- Coordinates; Locations; Climate; Adjoining localities

Menzies is a locality in the Australian state of South Australia located on Kangaroo Island about 136 kilometres (85 miles) south-west of the state capital of Adelaide and about 19 kilometres (12 miles) west of the municipal seat of Kingscote.

Its boundaries were created in May 2002 for the “long established name” which was derived from the cadastral unit of the Hundred of Menzies.

The principal land use in the locality is primary production.

Menzies is located within the federal division of Mayo, the state electoral district of Mawson and the local government area of the Kangaroo Island Council.
