= Koh-I-Noor railway station =

Railway station in Pakistan

Coordinates: 31.7569°N 74.2658°E

General information
- Owner: Ministry of Railways

Other information
- Station code: KONR

History
- Former names: Great Indian Peninsula Railway
Location

Koh-I-Noor railway station (Urdu: کوہ نور ریلوے اسٹیشن) is located in Pakistan.

== See also ==
- List of railway stations in Pakistan
- Pakistan Railways
