= Wisanger, South Australia =

Wisanger
- Town
- Coordinates: 35.620990°S 137.467640°E
- Country: Australia
- State: South Australia
- Region: Fleurieu and Kangaroo Island
- LGA: Kangaroo Island Council
- Location: 129 km (80 mi) south-west of Adelaide; 16 km (9.9 mi) west of Kingscote
- Established: 2002

Government
  - State electorate: Mawson
  - Federal division: Mayo

Population
  - Total: 140 (SAL 2021)
- Time zone: UTC+9:30 (ACST)
  - Summer (DST): UTC+10:30 (ACST)
- Postcode: 5223
- County: Carnarvon
- Mean max temp: 21.0 °C (69.8 °F)
- Mean min temp: 8.9 °C (48.0 °F)
- Annual rainfall: 444.0 mm (17.48 in)
Localities around Wisanger
Investigator Strait	Investigator Strait; Emu Bay	Emu Bay
Cassini	Wisanger	Bay of Shoals; Bay of Shoals (body of water); Kingscote
Cassini	Menzies	Cygnet River
- Coordinates; Locations; Climate; Adjoining localities

Wisanger is a locality in the Australian state of South Australia located on the north coast of Kangaroo Island overlooking Investigator Strait to the north and the Bay of Shoals to the east about 129 kilometres (80 miles) south-west of the state capital of Adelaide and about 16 kilometres (9.9 miles) west of the municipal seat of Kingscote.

Its boundaries were created in March 2002 for the “long established name” which is reported as being given by a “Henry Partridge, who took up land there, after 'Wisanger Manor' near Stroud, Gloucestershire once owned by his forebears.”

The locality includes the former Wisanger School which is listed on the South Australian Heritage Register.

Wisanger is located within the federal division of Mayo, the state electoral district of Mawson and the local government area of the Kangaroo Island Council.
