= Arthur Kingscote =

English cricketer

Personal information
- Full name: Arthur Fitzhardinge Kingscote
- Born: 12 July 1841; Westminster, London
- Died: 5 February 1881 (aged 39); Fulham, London, England
- Relatives: Henry Kingscote (father); Henry Bloomfield Kingscote (cousin)

Domestic team information
- Years: Team
- 1858–1859: MCC

Career statistics
Competition	FC
Matches	3
Runs scored	34
Batting average	8.50
100s/50s	0/0
Top score	14
Catches/stumpings	0/–
- Source: Cricinfo, 26 June 2010

Arthur Fitzhardinge Kingscote (12 July 1841 – 5 February 1881) was an English cricketer. Kingscote was born at Westminster in London.

Kingscote played three first-class matches for the Marylebone Cricket Club from 1858 to 1859. He made his first-class debut against Cambridge University and played two further fixtures for the club against the same opposition and against the Gentlemen of Kent.

Kingscote died at Fulham, London on 5 February 1881.

== Family ==
Kingscote's father, Henry Robert Kingscote, was an early Hampshire player and also represented Surrey, Sussex and the Marylebone Cricket Club. His cousin Henry Bloomfield Kingscote also played first-class cricket.
