= Cape North Lighthouse =

Lighthouse in Canada

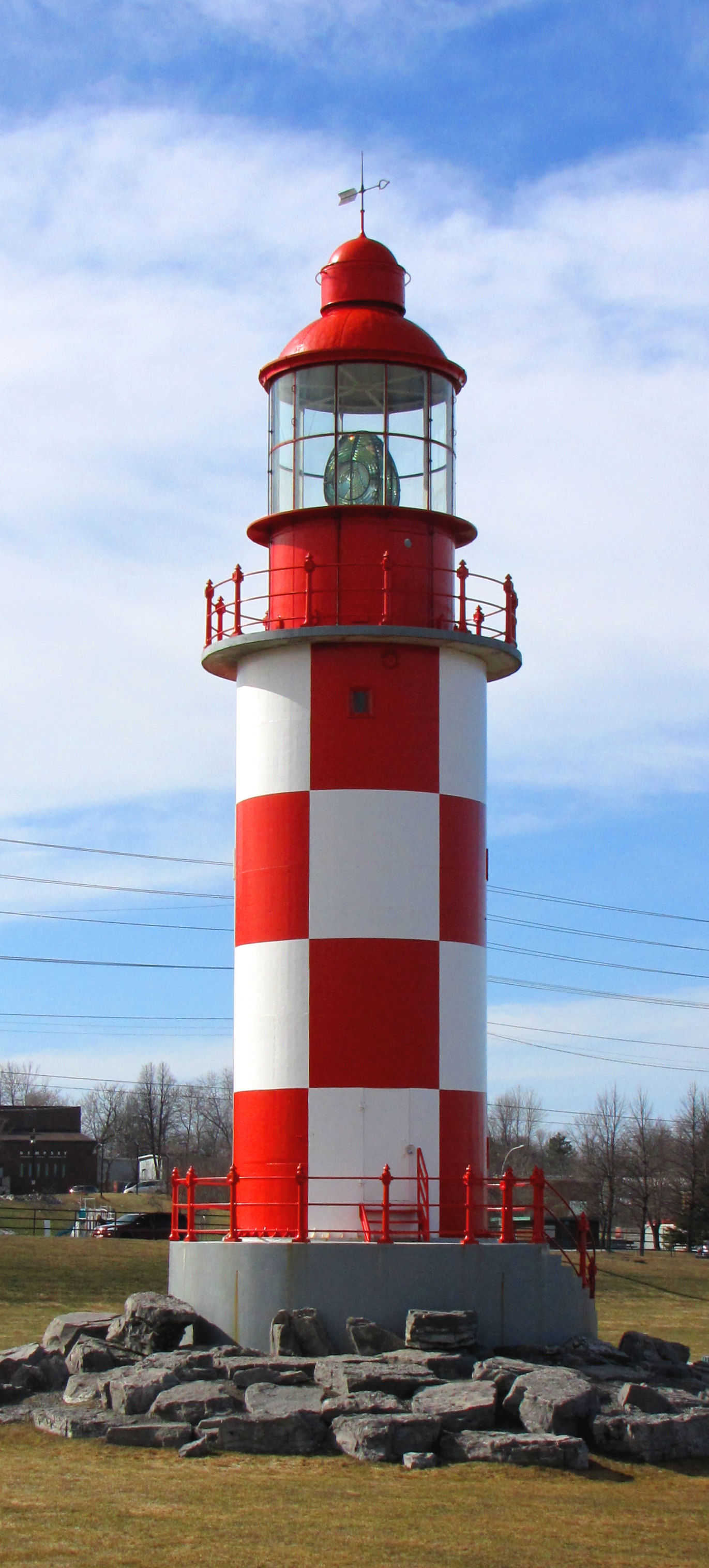
- Cape North Lighthouse
- Location: Ottawa, Ontario, Canada
- Coordinates: 45°24′07.6″N 75°37′25.8″W

Tower
- Constructed: 1856
- Construction: cast iron plates
- Height: 29 metres (95 ft)
- Shape: cylindrical tower with balcony and lantern
- Markings: red and white checkerboard tower, red lantern

Light
- Focal height: 34 m (112 ft)
- Lens: Fresnel lens

The Cape North Lighthouse is a cylindrical lighthouse tower with a red and white checkerboard pattern that stood at Money Point, near Cape North, Cape Breton from 1908 to 1980. While originally installed at Cape Race, Newfoundland, this tower is most commonly referred to as the Cape North Lighthouse. It now stands landlocked at the Canada Science and Technology Museum in Ottawa, Ontario, Canada.

== History and construction ==
The 29-meter-tall (95 ft) lighthouse was first installed at Cape Race point in Newfoundland in 1856 by the British Government's Trinity House, the official lighthouse authority for British waters. The lighthouse is constructed of 32 cast-iron plates joined with bolts. This sectional, modular design was chosen to reduce the cost of building towers and to facilitate lighthouse construction in remote, inaccessible locations using local, unskilled labour.

When a larger lighthouse was built at Cape Race, the old tower was disassembled, moved by ship, and reassembled for the light at Cape North, Nova Scotia, with a new Fresnel lens, made by Chance Brothers in England. The lens floats in a bed of mercury, and was turned by clockwork mechanism before being converted to electric power. The tower features a red checkerboard pattern, which was chosen to help make the lighthouse visible in dense fog and against the often snowy landscape.

== Relocation to Ottawa ==
In 1980, the Cape North Lighthouse, due to be replaced with more up-to-date technology, was acquired from the Canadian Coast Guard by the Canada Science and Technology Museum. The lighthouse was moved from Cape North, Nova Scotia to Ottawa, Ontario, where it was installed in the museum's Technology Park in 1980–81. Even with its modular design, moving the lighthouse was still a massive undertaking. The lighthouse has since become an iconic symbol of Canadian maritime history. The museum offers guided tours of the lighthouse during summer months.

An earthquake on July 3, 2010, caused a mercury spill within the lighthouse, resulting in a temporary closure and a cleanup that cost thousands of dollars. The lighthouse has since reopened to the public.
