= Nordkapp (Jan Mayen) =

Point of Jan Mayen, Norway

Coordinates: 71°9.6′N 7°57.6′W

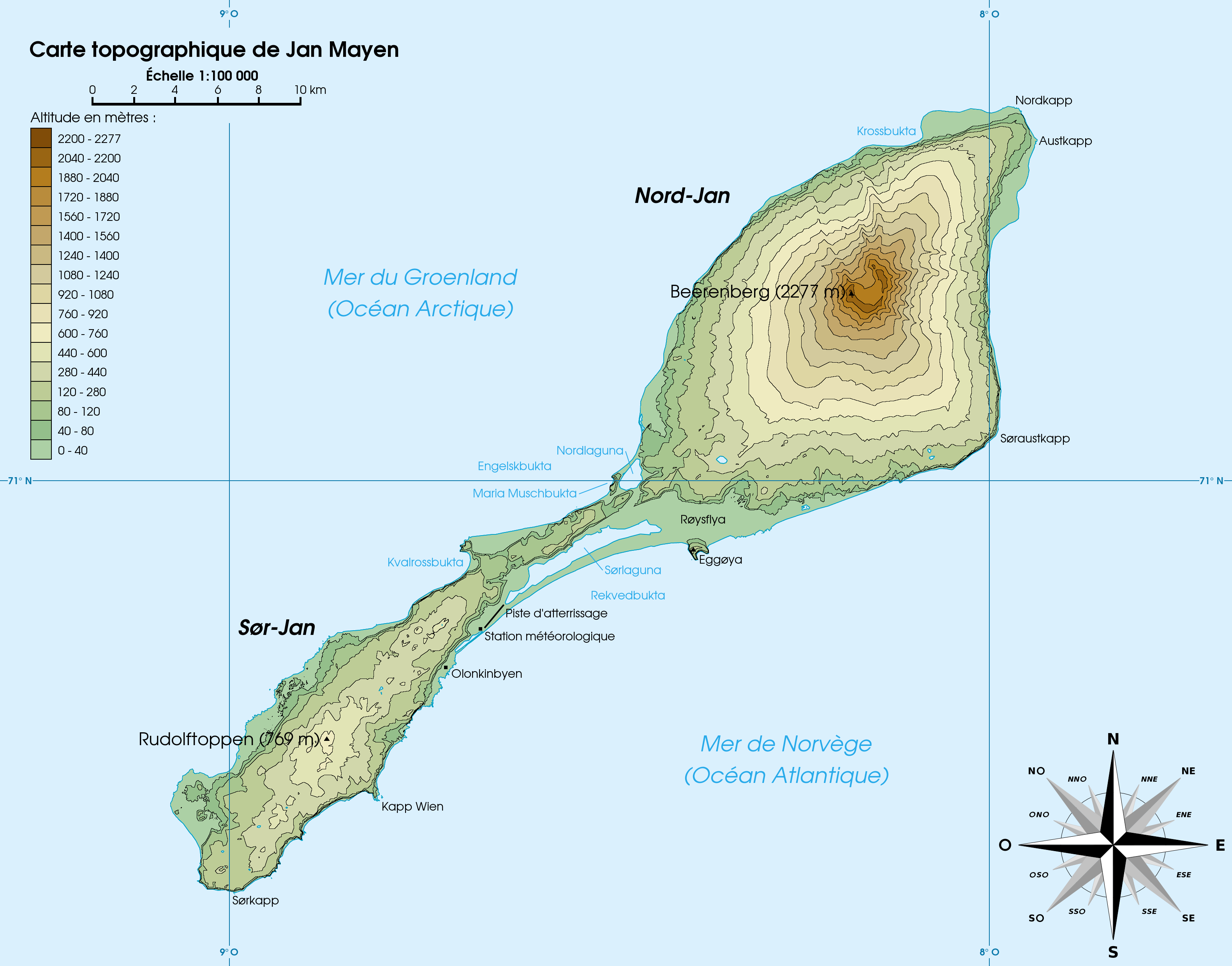
Nordkapp is located on the north(east)ern tip of Jan Mayen.

Nordkapp (North Cape) is the northernmost point of Jan Mayen, located at the northeastern extreme of the island. The cape is some 490 km east of eastern Greenland, 880 km west northwest of mainland Norway (Lofoten) and 950 km southwest of Sørkapp, Svalbard.
