= Cape North (South Georgia) =

Northernmost point of South Georgia

Coordinates: 53°58′S 37°44′W

Cape North is a headland marking the northernmost point of South Georgia, near the west end of the island. This name was first applied to the northwest tip of South Georgia on a map by Captain James Cook in 1775. Since 1912 it has become established for the northernmost point of the island, which is in keeping with the geographical position implied by the name.
