= Kingscote Park, Gloucestershire =

Kingscote Park
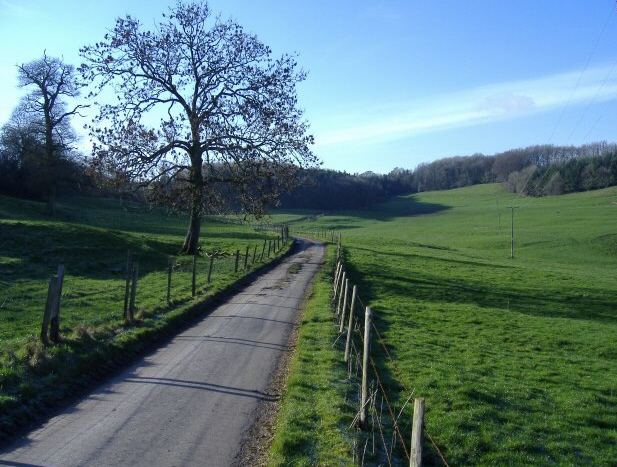
- The countryside around Kingscote Park

- Location in Gloucestershire
- 51°39′45.72″N 02°16′09.12″W
- Location: Tetbury, Gloucestershire, England

Kingscote Park (formerly Kingscote Cottage) is a Grade II listed house and country estate in Kingscote, near Tetbury, Gloucestershire, England. The original Kingscote Park was demolished in 1951. Both houses formed part of the manor of Kingscote which was held by the Kingscote family from the 12th century and is mentioned in the Domesday Book as 'Chingescote'.

== The original house ==
It was owned by Anthony Kingscote, whose daughter Catherine married Edward Jenner on 6 March 1788. The couple met in the grounds of the manor house when a balloon that Edward Jenner was experimenting with landed in the park.

In April 1829, the grounds were described in The Gardener's Magazine as 'A fine place; the pleasure-grounds extensive, and within the last five years greatly improved'.

In 1914, Frank Henry, writing of Colonel Sir Robert Nigel Fitzhardinge Kingscote, who owned Kingscote Park until his death in 1906, describes 'one of the finest racecourses in England' being in the estate grounds, 'although it has not been used for that purpose since 1825'. Also, of 'a secluded dell in the Park' where 'many prize fights were contested'.

In 1915, the estate was leased to John Jameson Cairness, who resided there.

Following the Second World War the house was neglected and fell into disrepair. It was demolished in 1951, with building materials being re-used in new buildings in the Kingscote area.

The stables, built in 1862, and former coach house remain and are Grade II listed. The former walled garden is now part of a small housing development.

== Kingscote Cottage ==
The cottage's origins date to a building, possibly a farmhouse, from the 18th century. It was enlarged in the 1790s and then extended, again, in the mid-1800s. It was the dower house to the original Kingscote Park.

In the 1820s, the cottage was home to the family of John Wedgwood, founder of the Royal Horticultural Society.

In the 1930s and 40s, Lieut-Col. Ardern Arthur Hulme Beaman, High Sheriff of Gloucestershire, occupied the cottage, which he called 'Kingscote Grange', and built a summer house there.

Following the demolition of the original house, the cottage and roughly 289 acres of land were offered for sale as 'Kingscote Park' in 1956. The property was purchased by the owners of 'Kingscote Grange'. The house is now used as holiday accommodation.
