= Henry Bloomfield Kingscote =

English cricketer and soldier

Henry Kingscote
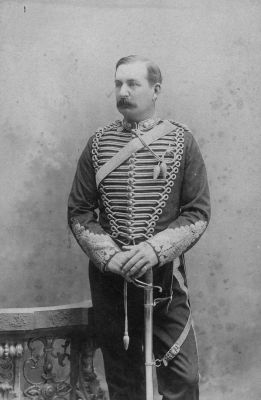
- Kingscote in uniform

Personal information
- Full name: Henry Bloomfield Kingscote
- Born: 28 February 1843; Kingscote, Gloucestershire
- Died: 1 August 1915 (aged 72); Westminster, London
- Batting: Right-handed
- Role: Wicket-keeper
- Relatives: Arthur Kingscote (cousin), Henry Kingscote (uncle)

Domestic team information
- Years: Team
- 1864–1878: Marylebone Cricket Club
- 1866–1881: Royal Artillery
- 1867: Kent
- 1877: Gloucestershire
- 1880: Devon

Career statistics
Competition	First-class
Matches	12
Runs scored	91
Batting average	5.68
100s/50s	0/0
Top score	44*
Catches/stumpings	12/8
- Source: CricInfo, 25 June 2010

Colonel Henry Bloomfield Kingscote (28 February 1843 – 1 August 1915) was an English soldier and amateur cricketer.

== Early life ==
He was born at Kingscote, Gloucestershire, the son of Colonel Thomas Henry Kingscote and his wife Harriott.

== Army career ==
Kingscote served in the Royal Artillery (RA), being commissioned in 1862 and seeing active service in the Bhutan War in the mid-1860s, during which he was wounded.

He rose to the rank of colonel by 1896, and in 1899 was commanding officer of the Royal Artillery in Canada. He retired in 1900.

== Cricket ==
Kingscote played cricket as a wicket-keeper for the Royal Artillery from 1864 to 1881, playing regularly for the RA and a number of times whilst stationed in India between 1882 and 1889. He played in 12 first-class cricket matches, spread throughout a career that lasted 11 years between 1867 and 1878. He represented Kent County Cricket Club in a single first-class match in 1867, Marylebone Cricket Club (MCC) seven times, the Gentlemen of Marylebone Cricket Club once and Gloucestershire three times in 1877, restricted in his opportunities at the top level of cricket by his military service. He played minor cricket for clubs such as MCC, I Zingari, Quidnuncs and appeared twice for Devon in 1880.

== Later life ==
Kingscote died at Westminster in August 1915 aged 72.

== Family ==
Kingscote's cousin Arthur Kingscote and uncle Henry Kingscote also played first-class cricket. He married three times but none of the marriages produced children.

== Bibliography ==
- Carlaw, Derek (2020). Kent County Cricketers, A to Z: Part One (1806–1914) (PDF). Cardiff: ACS.
