= Kingscote, Gloucestershire =

Village in Gloucestershire, England

Coordinates: 51°40′N 2°16′W

Kingscote
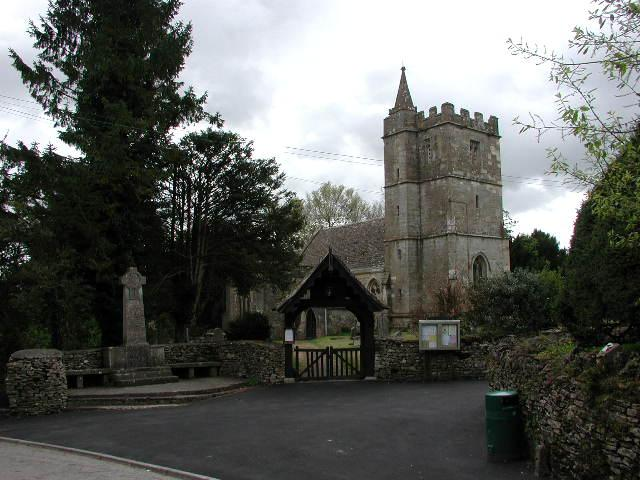
- St John's Church and War Memorial

- Location within Gloucestershire
- Population: 273 (2011)
- OS grid reference: ST814839
- Civil parish: Kingscote
- District: Cotswold
- Shire county: Gloucestershire
- Region: South West
- Country: England
- Sovereign state: United Kingdom
- Post town: TETBURY
- Postcode district: GL8
- Dialling code: 01453
- Police: Gloucestershire
- Fire: Gloucestershire
- Ambulance: South Western
- UK Parliament: South Cotswolds

Kingscote is a village and civil parish in the Cotswold district of Gloucestershire, England, set on the uplands near the south western edge of the Cotswold hills. It is situated about two miles (3 km) east of Uley, five miles (8 km) east of Dursley and four miles (6 km) west of Tetbury. The landscape is designated an Area of Outstanding Natural Beauty. The hamlet of Newington Bagpath lies to the west of the village; the parish lands extend near to the small village of Owlpen.

== History ==
From the 12th century until 1956, the manor with about 4,000 acres (16 km^{2}), was the property of the Kingscote family, originally tenants of the Berkeley family of Berkeley Castle, whose principal residence was Kingscote Park. The manor is mentioned in the Domesday Book as 'Chingescote'. This, on the site of the old manor house, was demolished in the 1960s. The house today known as Kingscote Park was formerly known as Kingscote Cottage, the dower house where John Wedgwood (1766–1844), founder of the Royal Horticultural Society, lived in the 1820s.

The parish is transected by a Roman road and a Roman settlement was excavated centred on a field named The Chessalls. The site covers 30 hectares and was occupied from the late 1st century AD through to its heyday in the 4th century. It may have been a small town or villa estate, with evidence of a series of strip buildings replaced in the 4th century by a house within a walled compound. The house seems to have been of high status, with mosaic floors, including a Venus mosaic now displayed in the nearby Corinium Museum, hypocausts and wall-plaster paintings.

The Rev. Alan Gardner Cornwall was rector of the adjoining ecclesiastical parish of Bagpath with Owlpen from 1827 to 1842. His memoirs were published shortly after his death and are available online in .pdf format. They are a lively account of his early life with the Clapham Sect in London, his friendship with the Kingscote family, whose daughter Caroline he married, and of his ministry at a time of social distress following the decline of the local woollen cloth industry in the 1830s.
