= Henry Robert Kingscote =

English cricketer and philanthropist

Henry Robert Kingscote (25 May 1802 – 13 July 1882) was an English philanthropist and amateur cricketer who played from 1825 to 1844. He was a founding director of the South Australian Company, and also founded several charitable organisations, churches and schools.

== Life ==
Born at Hinton, Hampshire, on 25 May 1802, Kingscote was educated at Harrow and devoted much of his early life to cricket and hunting.

He was a founding director of the South Australian Company. The town of Kingscote in South Australia is named after him.

After a narrow escape from drowning, he turned his attention to religion and good works; becoming a friend of bishop Charles Blomfield, he helped found the Church of England Scripture Readers' Association and the Metropolitan Visiting and Relief Association. He also helped to found churches and schools, sent aid to the Irish poor and British troops in Crimea, and tried to found workshops for the blind. He was one of the founders of the British and Colonial Emigration Society and the National Orphan Asylum at Ham Common.

== Cricket career ==
Kingscote was six-foot, 6 inches tall, and this often gave him an advantage. He first played at Lord's on 21 May 1823, and in 1827 he was elected president of the Marylebone Cricket Club (MCC). He made 33 known appearances in important matches including 8 for the Gentlemen from 1825 to 1834.

== Family ==
Henry Robert Kingscote was the second son of Thomas Kingscote (b. 9 Dec 1757, d. 15 Apr 1811) and Harriet Peyton, fourth daughter of Sir Henry Peyton. He married Harriett Elizabeth Tower, daughter of Christopher Thomas Tower, on 11 July 1833, and had 6 sons and 5 daughters. His children were:

- Aldena (1835–1908; married Sir Archibald Hope of Craighall, 12th Bt.)
- Laura Elizabeth (1836–1927)
- Henry (1837–8)
- Emily Sophia (1839–1889; married James Graham in 1862)
- Henry Fitzhardinge (1840–1841)
- Arthur Fitzhardinge (1841–1881; also briefly a cricket player)
- Eva (1843–1872, married Charles Stewart, son of Duncan John Stewart, on 7 December 1870 at St. George Hanover Square, London)
- Algernon (1844–?)
- Howard (1845–1917; retired from the army as a colonel; married in 1885 writer Adeline Drummond Wolff, daughter of diplomat and politician Henry Drummond Wolff; their son Algernon Kingscote (1888–1964) was a notable tennis player)
- Anthony (1846–1891; Captain, Royal Navy)
- Edith (1850–1937, married Lt.-Col. John Sandcroft Holmes on 1 February 1877)

Kingscote's nephew Henry Bloomfield Kingscote was also a cricketer, for the Royal Artillery Cricket Club.

== Later life ==
He died on 13 July 1882 at Westminster.

== Bibliography ==
- Arthur Haygarth, Scores & Biographies, Volume 1–2 (1744–1840), Lillywhite, 1862
- Lee, Sidney, ed. (1892). "Kingscote, Henry Robert" . Dictionary of National Biography. Vol. 31. London: Smith, Elder & Co.
