= Point Marsden =

Headland in South Australia

Point Marsden South Australia
- Coordinates: 35°33′50.03″S 137°37′55.52″E
- LGA(s): Kangaroo Island Council

Point Marsden (also called Marsden Point) is a headland located on the north coast of Kangaroo Island in South Australia. It was named after William Marsden, Second Secretary to the Admiralty by Matthew Flinders in 1802. It is the western extremity of Nepean Bay and has been the site of a navigation aid since 1915.

== Description ==
Point Marsden is the most easterly point of the Kangaroo Island coast that directly adjoins Investigator Strait. It is the termination for a pair of coastlines - one extending from Cape Borda in the west and the other extending from Cape Rouge from the south in Nepean Bay. It is described as being ‘a rocky headland of moderate height’ and that ‘High wooded land rises about 0.5 nautical miles (0.93 kilometres; 0.58 miles) W of it.’ It is the western extremity of the opening to Nepean Bay.

== Formation, geology and oceanography ==
Point Marsden was formed when the sea reached its present level 7,500 years ago after sea levels started to rise at the start of the Holocene. The cliff line which includes Point Marsden consists of a metamorphic rock belonging to the Kangaroo Island Group bedrock called Boxing Bay Formation. The water adjoining Point Marsden drops to a depth of 10 metres (33 feet) at the outer edge of the wave-cut platform at the base of its cliff face.

== History ==
=== Aboriginal use ===
By 1999, the literature had not cited any archaeological discoveries specific to Aboriginal use of land in the immediate vicinity of Point Marsden.

=== European discovery ===
Point Marsden was discovered by Matthew Flinders on 21 March 1802 and named after William Marsden, Second Secretary to the Admiralty.

== Navigation aid ==
A navigation aid consisting of a 3-metre-high (9.8 ft) tower with a single flashing light was installed in 1915. The light which is 85 m (279 ft) above sea level, assists vessels underway at night in Investigator Strait. The need for a navigation aid at Point Marsden was suggested as early as 1882 and was one of four sites recommended for immediate construction of navigation aids in 1912 when the responsibility for navigation transferred from the South Australian government to the Australian government.

== Economic activity ==
As of 2014, the land adjoining Point Marsden is used for farming. Farming activity at the locality is reported as being underway as early as 1908 with most of the land being cleared of native vegetation by 1945.
