= Kingscote, South Australia =

Town on Kangaroo Island in South Australia

Kingscote
- Town
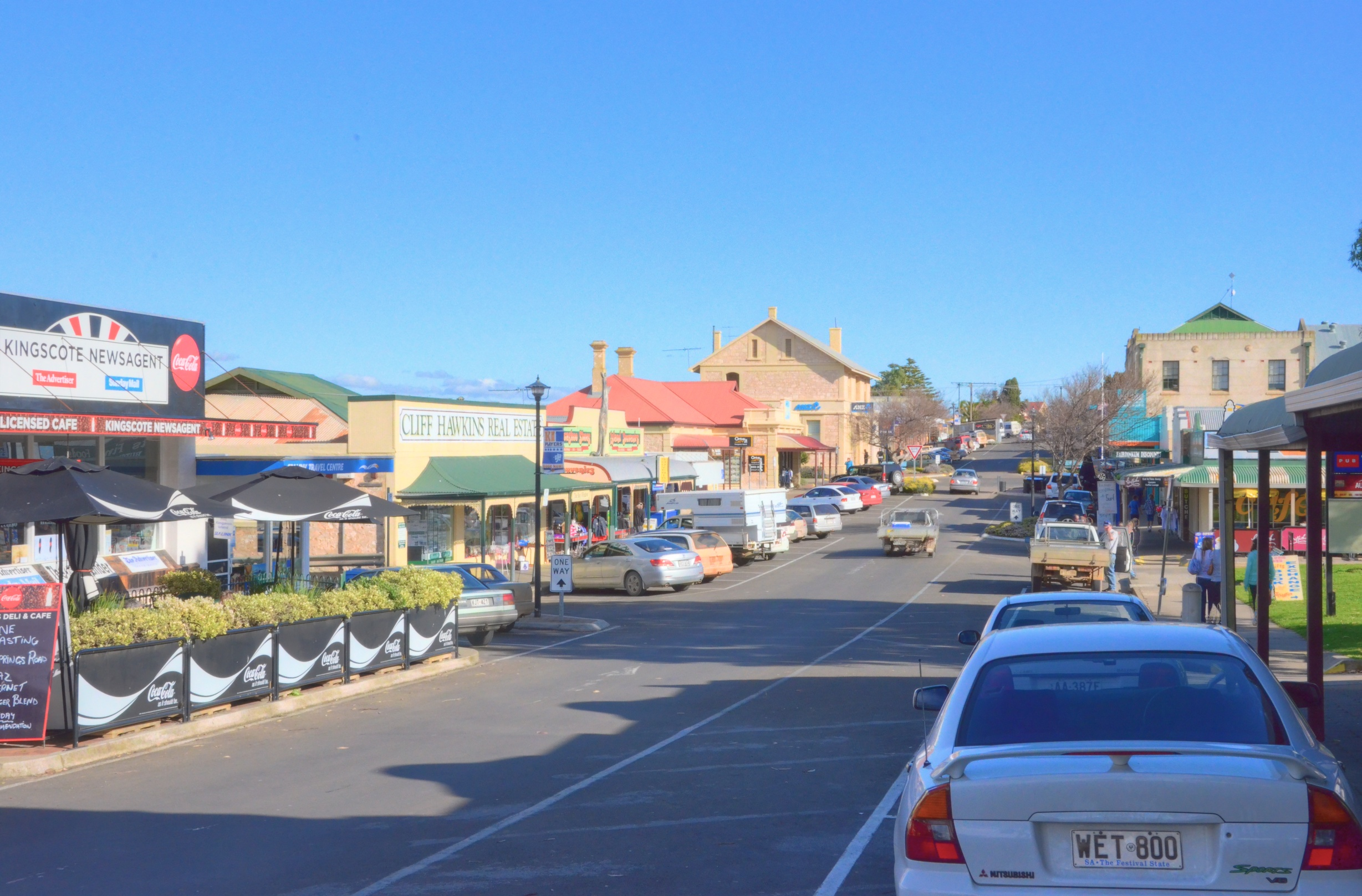
- Dauncey Street

- Coordinates: 35°39′11″S 137°38′03″E
- Country: Australia
- State: South Australia
- Region: Fleurieu and Kangaroo Island
- LGA: Kangaroo Island Council
- Location: 119 km (74 mi) south-west of Adelaide
- Established: 1836

Government
  - State electorate: Mawson
  - Federal division: Mayo

Population
  - Total: 1,915 (UCL 2021)
- Postcode: 5223
- County: Carnarvon
- Mean max temp: 19.1 °C (66.4 °F)
- Mean min temp: 11.6 °C (52.9 °F)
- Annual rainfall: 484 mm (19.1 in)
Localities around Kingscote
Wisanger	Nepean Bay	Nepean Bay
Wisanger	Kingscote	Nepean Bay
Menzies	Cygnet River; Brownlow KI	Nepean Bay
- Location; Climate; Adjoining localities

Kingscote is a town in the Australian state of South Australia located on Kangaroo Island about 119 kilometres (74 mi) south-west of the state capital of Adelaide. It is South Australia's oldest European settlement and the island's largest town. It is a well-established tourist centre and the administrative and communications centre. It is home to a colony of the smallest penguins in the world, the Australian little penguin.

The town is served by Kingscote Airport.

== History ==
The South Australian Company established its colony at Kingscote at Reeves Point on 27 July 1836, as South Australia's first official European settlement, the first settlers having arrived on the Duke of York, and named for Henry Robert Kingscote, one of the founding directors of the company.

It was early suggested that Kingscote could serve as the capital of South Australia, but the island's resources were insufficient to support such a large community; the South Australian Company moved almost six months later to Adelaide after sending surveyors to find a better site.

The history of the area is displayed in the museum in Hope Cottage, to the north of the town. Hope Cottage was one of the three earliest houses built in Kingscote, circa 1850, with the adjoining cottages of Faith and Charity. (Faith has been subsequently demolished.)

Joyce Debenham Seager arrived here as the only doctor on the island in 1925 and she established the first temporary hospital travelling by horse to visit patients.

The Old Mulberry Tree at Reeves Point was planted in 1836 and still bears fruit. Reeves Point has been placed on the Australian Heritage Places List.

The current town of Kingscote is now immediately to the south of the original Kingscote settlement at Reeves Point in the area originally known as Queenscliffe (the origin of the name of the Queenscliffe Hotel in Dauncey Street).

=== State heritage places ===
Kingscote contains the following places which are listed on the South Australian Heritage Register:

- Hope Cottage Museum
- The Bluff Cottage
- Barrett's Store
- Reeves Point Settlement Site, the site of the first official settlement in the Colony of South Australia
- Old Government Quarry

== Facilities ==
Kingscote has a school offering years reception to 12 (R-12), a hospital, supermarket, post office and government offices. It is the administrative centre for the Kangaroo Island Council, whose offices have recently undergone a significant upgrade. Our Lady of Perpetual Help Catholic Church is part of the parish centred on St Francis Xavier's Cathedral in Adelaide.

Recreational facilities include a sports centre and adjoining oval and netball courts.

=== Foreshore ===
A wharf and jetty stand at the waterfront. They were previously used by the roll-on, roll-off vessels, Troubridge and Island Seaway and now serve smaller vessels.

The jetty is accessible for recreational fishing and scuba diving and pelican feeding and nocturnal penguin tours are offered at the Penguin Centre, which is adjacent to the jetty.

The Aurora Ozone Seafront Hotel, with its mermaid statue, is a well-known landmark on the Kingscote foreshore. The hotel opened in 1907. It was destroyed by fire 27 Aug 1918, but was rebuilt and opened for business again on 29 December 1920.

==== Shark proof tidal swimming pool ====
A shark-proof tidal swimming pool is open to the public. Fundraising commenced in 1947 and plans were drafted by the South Australian Harbours Board. The Harbours Board estimated the total construction cost for the pool to be £607 and Mr W. S. Myers, won the contract for its construction. A subscription list was started and maintained to update local residents on fundraising progress and matching funding was offered by the South Australian Tourist Bureau. Construction commenced in 1949. Work continued in 1950, following delays owing to labour shortages and inclement weather.

== Media ==
Kingscote and the island receives most of its radio stations from Adelaide which includes ABC Radio Adelaide, SAFM, KIIS 102.3, Triple M Adelaide, Nova 919, and Radio Adelaide. Kix FM 90.7 is Kangaroo Island's own community based station which is run by local volunteers.

Television coverage is provided by public broadcasters, ABC South Australia, SBS, and commercial broadcaster channels 7, 9, and 10.

The local newspaper is served by The Islander which publishes on print and online.

== Little penguin colony ==
In 2007, the Kingscote colony of little penguins' population was 868 adults and fell to 706 in 2010. In 2011, it was believed to be either declining or stable. In 2012, the population fell to 300 adults according to DEW figures. In 2013, the Kingscote colony of little penguins had dropped to 20 birds, according to tour operator John Ayliffe. Official 2013 census figures were greater, estimating 154 breeding adults, down 48 per cent from the previous year and 82 per cent since the population peak in 2007.

Kingscote Little Penguin Colony
Year	Population	References
2006	410	
2007	868	
2008	748	
2009	654	
2010	706	
2011	380	
2012	300	
2013	154	
2014	128	

Increasing populations of long-nosed fur seals are believed to be a factor in the decline. Other predators of penguins on Kangaroo Island include rats, dogs, cats, goannas, sea lions and sea eagles. Since the 1990s, penguin tour operators have improved the nesting habitat in the visitation area at Kingscote, through vegetation, habitat protection and constructing boardwalks for tourists. In October 2011, 15 dead penguin chicks were found near the Kingscote colony with their heads removed. A dog or cat attack was presumed to be the cause of death. A similar event also happened in 2010.

Disease and declining fish stocks have also been blamed for declines in Little penguin numbers.

Other colonies in South Australia have experienced dramatic declines since the 1990s. The nearest examples of colonies in decline are found in Encounter Bay (Granite Island, Wright Island and West Island) and at Penneshaw on Kangaroo Island.

Accounts of little penguins at Kingscote exist from the 1930s.

=== The Spit ===
Historically, little penguins have also been observed in burrows on The Spit which lies across the mouth of Bay of Shoals. Observations of penguins at this location were published in 1888, 1911, 1915, 1934 and 1938. A child visiting in 1947 found at least six penguin burrows. The species did not appear in the list of birds observed at Busby Islet Conservation Park (part of The Spit) which was published in 1987. The colonies at Busby and Beatrice Islets became extinct after introduced African boxthorn vegetation was removed. This destabilised the sand and rendered the habitat unsuitable for penguin burrows.

== Climate ==
Kingscote experiences a warm-summer mediterranean climate (Köppen climate classification: Csb), Trewartha: Csbl); with warm, dry summers; mild, relatively dry springs and autumns; and mild winters with moderate precipitation.

Climate data for Kingscote (1914−2002, extremes to 1957, rainfall to 1877) 35.66° S, 137.64° E
Month	Jan	Feb	Mar	Apr	May	Jun	Jul	Aug	Sep	Oct	Nov	Dec	Year
Record high °C (°F)	40.6 (105.1)	41.0 (105.8)	35.8 (96.4)	31.0 (87.8)	24.7 (76.5)	22.4 (72.3)	22.0 (71.6)	23.0 (73.4)	27.5 (81.5)	34.4 (93.9)	39.4 (102.9)	38.8 (101.8)	41.0 (105.8)
Mean daily maximum °C (°F)	23.7 (74.7)	23.5 (74.3)	22.2 (72.0)	19.8 (67.6)	17.5 (63.5)	15.4 (59.7)	14.6 (58.3)	15.0 (59.0)	16.5 (61.7)	18.5 (65.3)	20.5 (68.9)	22.3 (72.1)	19.1 (66.4)
Mean daily minimum °C (°F)	14.9 (58.8)	15.4 (59.7)	14.3 (57.7)	12.5 (54.5)	10.8 (51.4)	9.3 (48.7)	8.4 (47.1)	8.3 (46.9)	9.1 (48.4)	10.3 (50.5)	12.0 (53.6)	13.6 (56.5)	11.6 (52.8)
Record low °C (°F)	8.3 (46.9)	8.9 (48.0)	6.1 (43.0)	5.6 (42.1)	2.8 (37.0)	−1.1 (30.0)	2.1 (35.8)	2.0 (35.6)	1.6 (34.9)	2.2 (36.0)	4.7 (40.5)	6.1 (43.0)	−1.1 (30.0)
Average precipitation mm (inches)	14.9 (0.59)	17.4 (0.69)	17.9 (0.70)	34.2 (1.35)	58.0 (2.28)	71.9 (2.83)	77.4 (3.05)	64.5 (2.54)	46.6 (1.83)	36.4 (1.43)	22.4 (0.88)	19.4 (0.76)	486.6 (19.16)
Average precipitation days (≥ 0.2 mm)	3.7	3.7	5.1	8.8	12.9	15.9	18.2	17.2	13.0	10.1	7.0	5.5	121.1
Average afternoon relative humidity (%)	63	65	67	70	73	75	74	72	70	66	63	63	68
Average dew point °C (°F)	13.0 (55.4)	13.5 (56.3)	12.8 (55.0)	12.1 (53.8)	10.7 (51.3)	9.6 (49.3)	8.2 (46.8)	8.0 (46.4)	9.4 (48.9)	9.6 (49.3)	10.8 (51.4)	11.9 (53.4)	10.8 (51.4)
Source: Australian Bureau of Meteorology

There is also data at the airport in Kingscote, 12.0 km away. It experiences similar climatic conditions, but due to its inland location, the weather station has a greater seasonal difference between winter and summer; and the diurnal range is greater.

Climate data for Kingscote Airport (1993−2024) 35.71° S, 137.52° E
Month	Jan	Feb	Mar	Apr	May	Jun	Jul	Aug	Sep	Oct	Nov	Dec	Year
Record high °C (°F)	45.4 (113.7)	43.8 (110.8)	41.9 (107.4)	34.4 (93.9)	27.1 (80.8)	22.4 (72.3)	25.0 (77.0)	25.0 (77.0)	29.8 (85.6)	34.6 (94.3)	41.0 (105.8)	43.0 (109.4)	45.4 (113.7)
Mean daily maximum °C (°F)	26.8 (80.2)	26.5 (79.7)	24.6 (76.3)	21.7 (71.1)	18.6 (65.5)	16.1 (61.0)	15.4 (59.7)	16.1 (61.0)	17.8 (64.0)	20.3 (68.5)	23.0 (73.4)	25.1 (77.2)	21.0 (69.8)
Mean daily minimum °C (°F)	13.4 (56.1)	13.5 (56.3)	11.5 (52.7)	8.9 (48.0)	7.8 (46.0)	6.7 (44.1)	6.0 (42.8)	5.8 (42.4)	6.4 (43.5)	7.3 (45.1)	9.7 (49.5)	11.1 (52.0)	9.0 (48.2)
Record low °C (°F)	3.1 (37.6)	4.7 (40.5)	2.9 (37.2)	−0.4 (31.3)	−0.8 (30.6)	−2.4 (27.7)	−2.1 (28.2)	−1.9 (28.6)	−2.2 (28.0)	−2.0 (28.4)	0.4 (32.7)	2.3 (36.1)	−2.4 (27.7)
Average precipitation mm (inches)	15.3 (0.60)	17.5 (0.69)	21.6 (0.85)	26.0 (1.02)	47.5 (1.87)	67.2 (2.65)	65.7 (2.59)	56.4 (2.22)	45.8 (1.80)	30.7 (1.21)	22.5 (0.89)	19.5 (0.77)	436.3 (17.18)
Average precipitation days (≥ 0.2 mm)	4.3	4.4	6.3	9.5	15.4	18.6	19.9	19.2	15.3	10.4	7.9	6.7	137.9
Average afternoon relative humidity (%)	44	45	47	53	63	68	69	64	61	55	48	45	55
Average dew point °C (°F)	11.3 (52.3)	11.8 (53.2)	11.1 (52.0)	10.3 (50.5)	10.0 (50.0)	8.7 (47.7)	8.0 (46.4)	8.0 (46.4)	8.5 (47.3)	8.3 (46.9)	9.5 (49.1)	9.9 (49.8)	9.6 (49.3)
Source: Australian Bureau of Meteorology

== Gallery ==
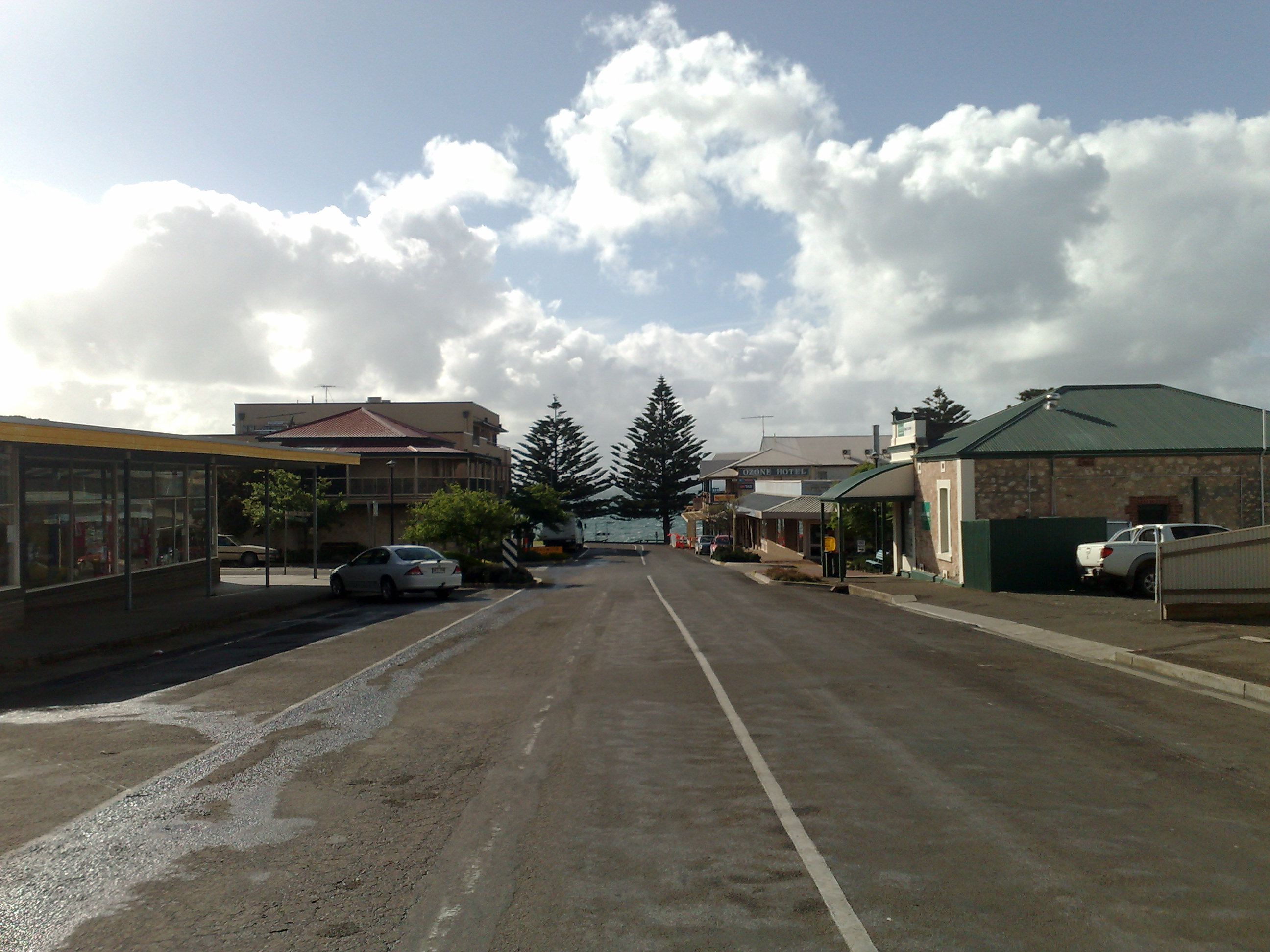
Commercial Street

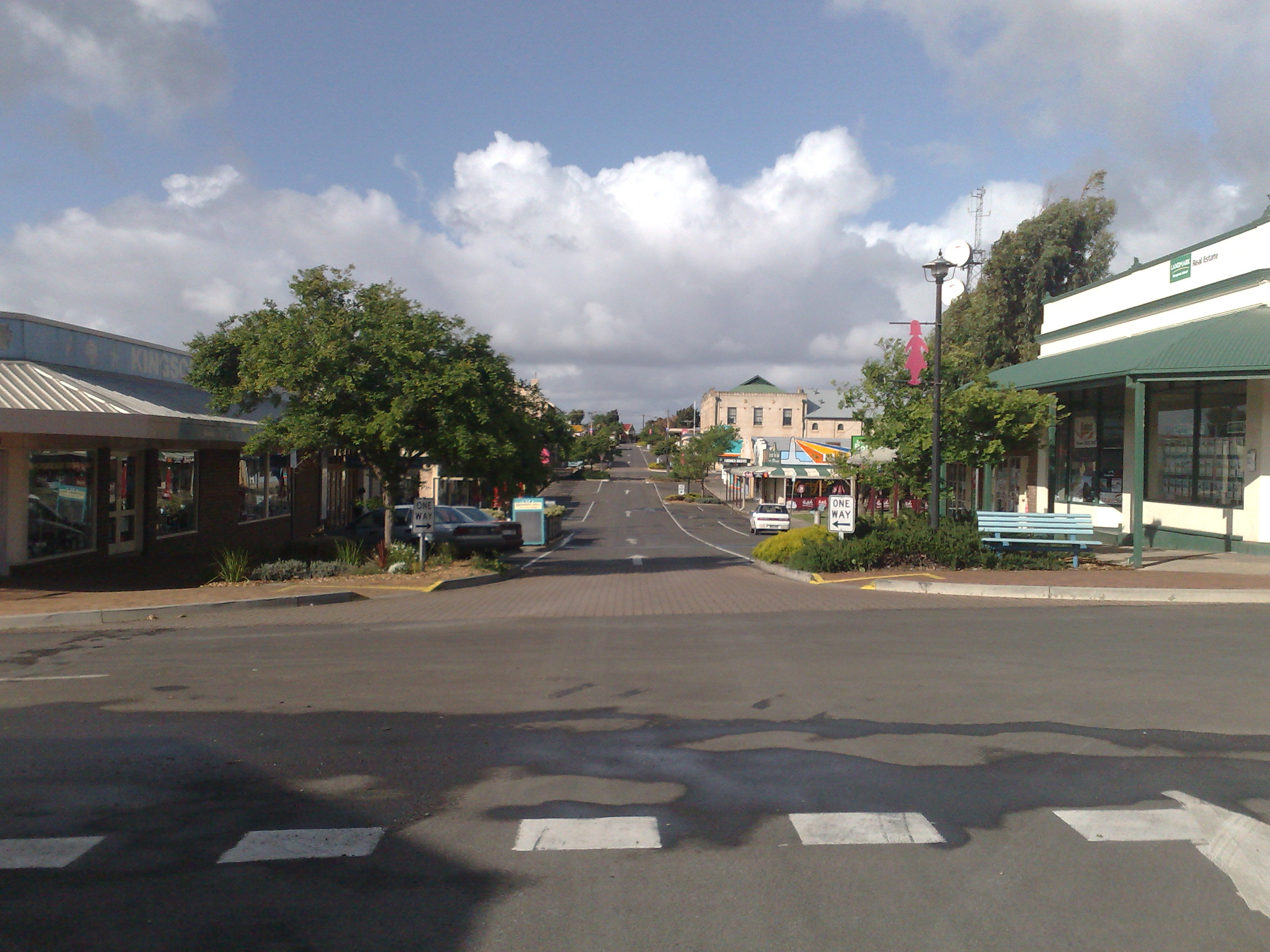
Dauncey Street

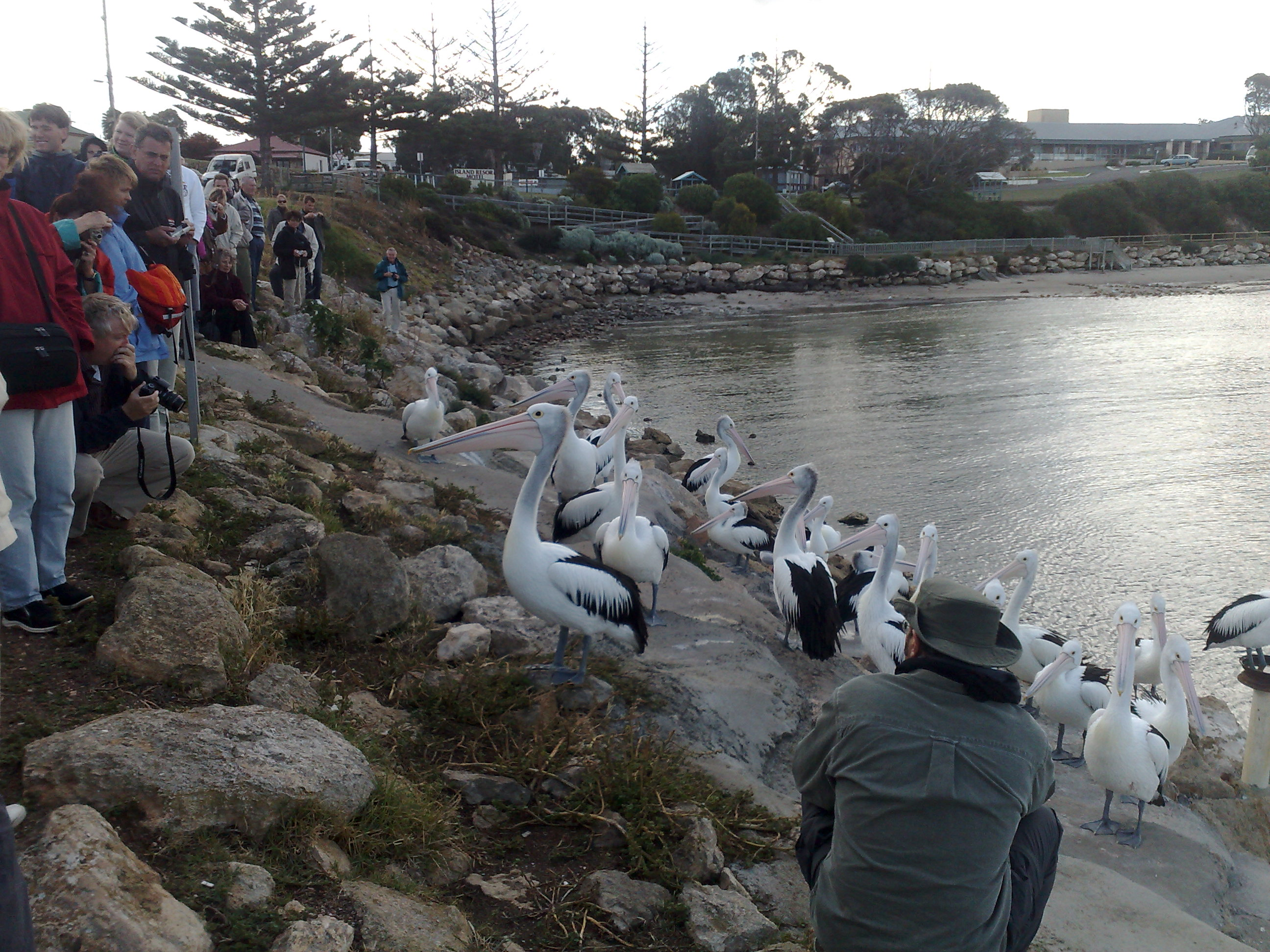
Pelican feeding

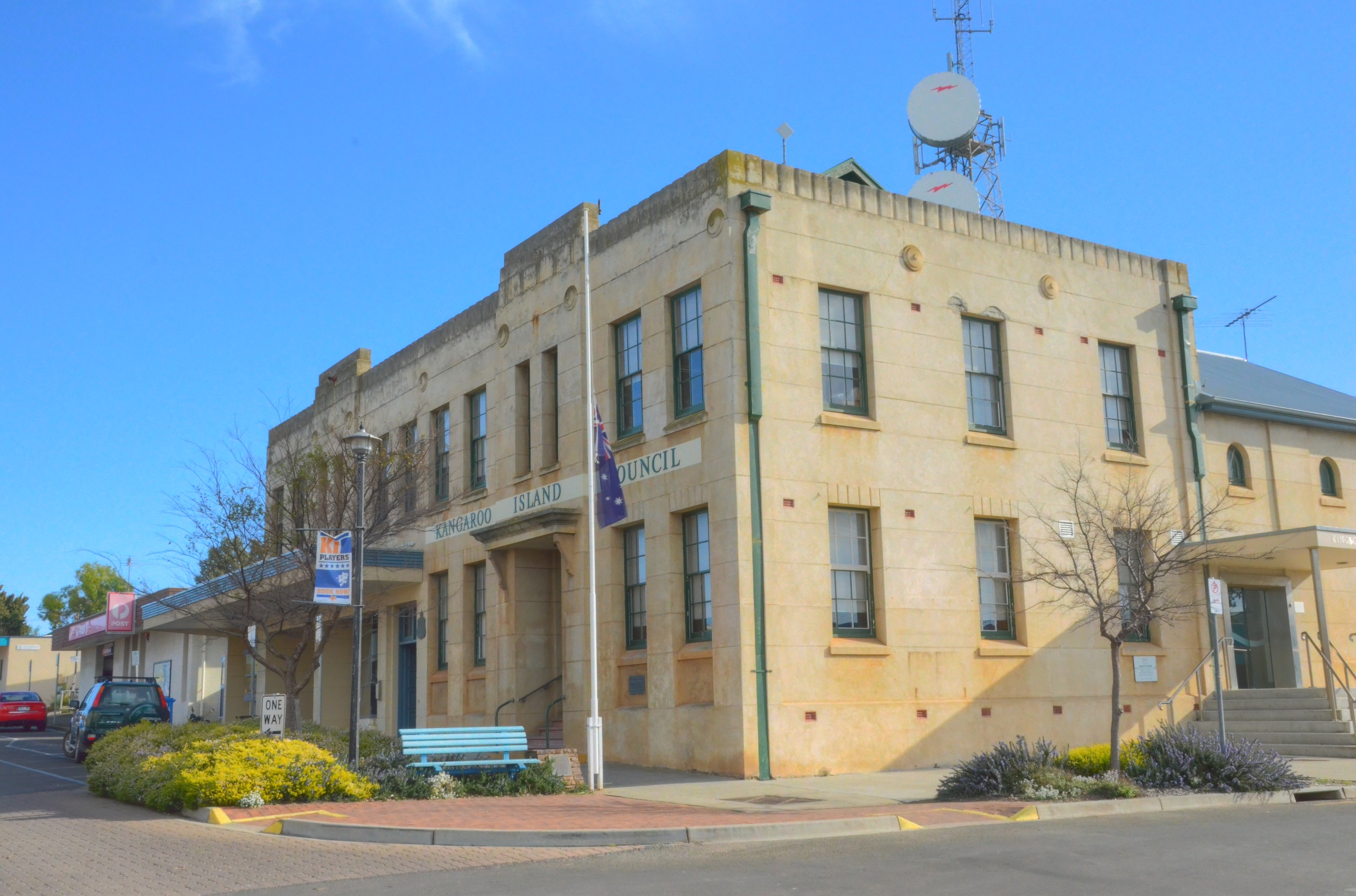
Council chambers

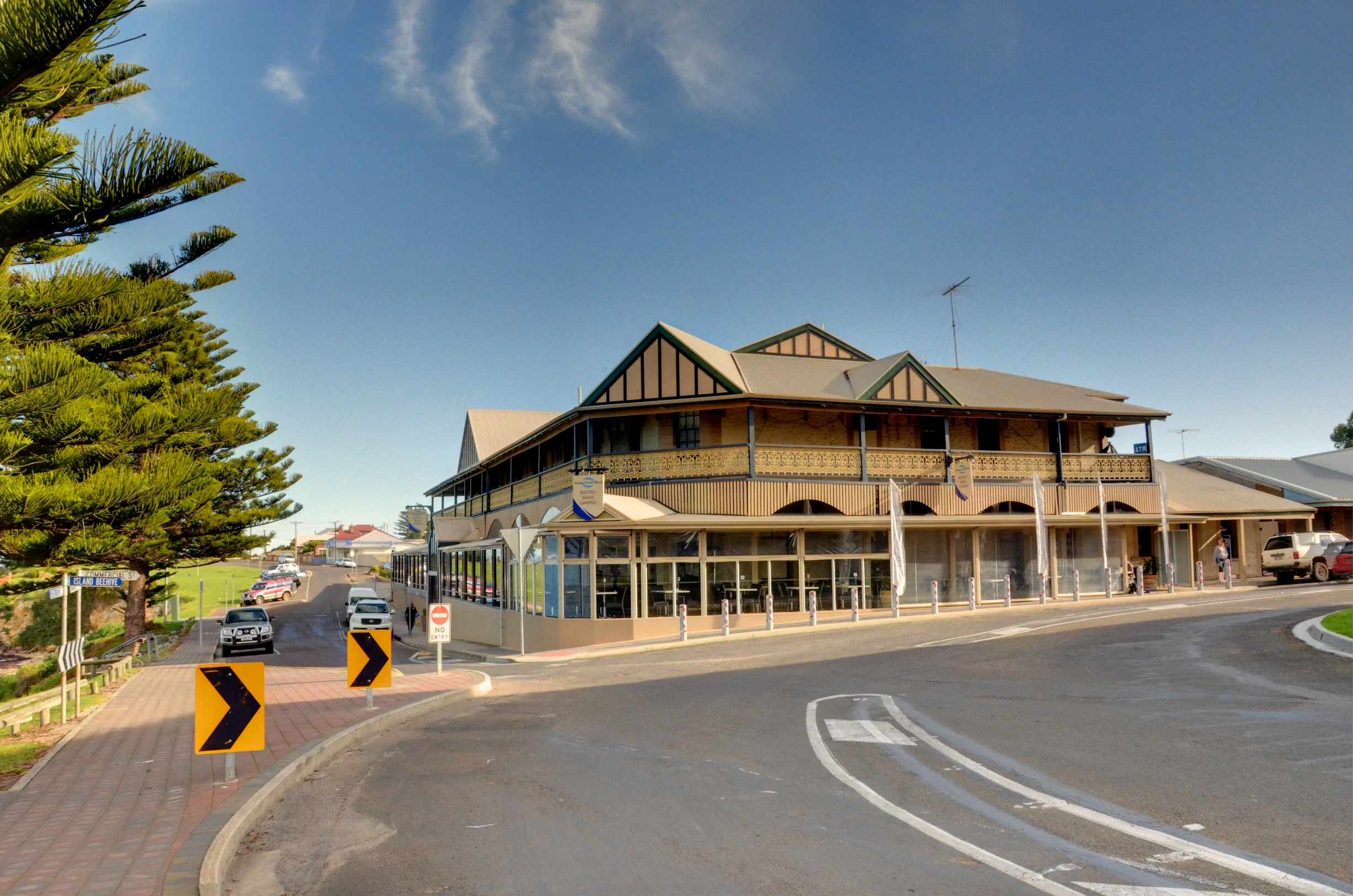
Ozone Hotel

== See also ==
- Kingscote (disambiguation)
- Kingscote Airport
- List of little penguin colonies
