= Pink Bay =

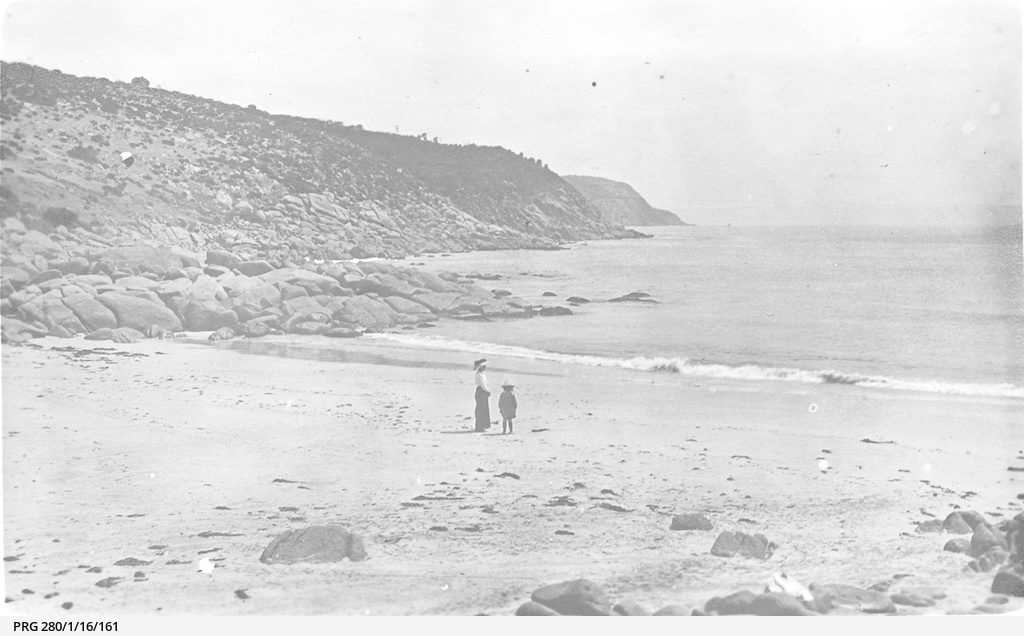
- Pink Bay beach near Cape Willoughby, Kangaroo Island [State Library of South Australia PRG 280/1/16/161]

- Location in South Australia
- Coordinates: 35°49′57″S 138°07′27″E
- Type: Bay
- Part of: Backstairs Passage
- Basin countries: Australia
- Designation: Marine park

Pink Bay is a bay in the Australian state of South Australia and is located at the east end of Dudley Peninsula on Kangaroo Island overlooking Backstairs Passage in the gazetted locality of Willoughby about 110 kilometres (68 mi) south of the state capital of Adelaide and about 20 kilometres (12 mi) east of Penneshaw.

== Description ==
Pink Bay is described as "a narrow, V-shaped bay" with a "40 m pocket of sand wedged inside." It opens into Moncrieff Bay, a larger bay occupying the waters between Cape St Albans in the north and Cape Willoughby in the east. The coastline on either side of Pink Bay is "predominantly composed of steep, 100 m high vegetated bluffs."

Its sandy beach is reported as being an unpatrolled swimming beach by Surf Life Saving Australia (SLSA) who considers it to be ‘least hazardous’ and that "it faces north and is somewhat protected, but does receive low swell." While the SLSA advises that most visitors to nearby Cape Willoughby come to "view the scenery and visit the lighthouse, with little use of the beaches," Sea Dragon Lodge, described as "a luxury boutique retreat" and located on land surrounding Pink Bay advises on its website that the beach has "private access."

Its name is derived from "the pink colouring in the local granite."

== History ==
Pink Bay was used as an access point by the South Australian Marine Board for goods and personnel for the Cape Willoughby Lighthouse from the early 1880s.

The property surrounding Pink Bay was originally leased and farmed by Tony Ebert from 1900 until 1918 when it was bought by Annie Louise Lashmar. It remained in the Lashmar family until 1998 when it was bought by Mike and Cherry Hobbs who planted many trees to revegetate the cleared farmland. In 2008, it was sold to Sea Dragon Lodge.

== Flora and fauna ==
Pink Bay has a diversity of fish life and aquamarine variety including: King George Whiting, Silver Whiting, Flathead, Salmon, Tommy Ruffs, Mullet, Blue Throated Wrasse, Squid, Yellowtail Kingfish, and various sharks.

== Protected area status ==
As of late 2012, the waters adjoining its shoreline are within a habitat protection zone in the protected area known as the Encounter Marine Park.
