= Moncrieff Bay =

- Location in South Australia
- Location: Kangaroo Island, South Australia
- Coordinates: 35°49′30″S 138°07′29″E
- Type: Bay
- Etymology: Alexander Bain Moncrieff
- Part of: Backstairs Passage
- Basin countries: Australia
- Designation: Marine park
- Max. length: about 4.5 kilometres (2.8 mi)
- Max. width: about 1.0 kilometre (0.62 mi)
- Max. depth: about 7 metres (23 ft)

Moncrieff Bay is a bay in the Australian state of South Australia located at the east end of the Dudley Peninsula on Kangaroo Island in the gazetted locality of Willoughby overlooking Backstairs Passage about 106 kilometres (66 mi) south-west of the state capital of Adelaide and about 47 kilometres (29 mi) south-east of the municipal seat of Kingscote.

It was named in September 1908 after A. B. Moncrieff, the Engineer in Chief of the Department of Marine & Harbors. It was one of eleven places in South Australia so named at the time as part of an effort “to name some of the more prominent features on the coast of South Australia which had been left blank in the Admiralty and land charts…”

It consists of the section of coastline which faces east and runs in a north-south direction between the headlands of Cape St Albans in the north and Cape Willoughby in the south. It includes one inlet – Pink Bay. The coastline is described as “rugged” and as “predominantly composed of steep, 100 m high vegetated bluffs.” Water depths within the bay are less than 10 metres (33 ft) with a maximum depth of 7 metres (23 ft) shown as single sounding in an official source.

The bay’s coastline is described as being “boulder beaches’ with the exception of two beaches composed of sand at its southern end. The beach at Pink Bay in the west has a length of 40 metres (130 ft) while the other one known as 'Cape Willoughby' in the east has a length of 150 metres (490 ft). Both are unpatrolled swimming beaches which are considered by Surf Life Saving Australia to be respectively ‘least hazardous’ and ‘moderately hazardous’ while the "boulder beaches" being considered to be "extremely hazardous."

The bay’s bottom is described in 2002 by divers doing a fish population survey as consisting of “blocks (1-2 m) and boulders going to sand at 5 m depth” and there was a “rocky bottom at southern end of (the) bay 250 m each side of beach.” Also, the following algae genera and species were considered to be the dominant alga present in parts of the bay surveyed - genus Ecklonia, genus Cystophora represented by C.siliquosa, C.moniliformis, and C. intermedia, genus Acrocarpia and Sargassum fallax from the family Sargassaceae.

As of late 2012, the waters adjoining its shoreline are within a habitat protection zone in the protected area known as the Encounter Marine Park.
