= Cape St Albans =

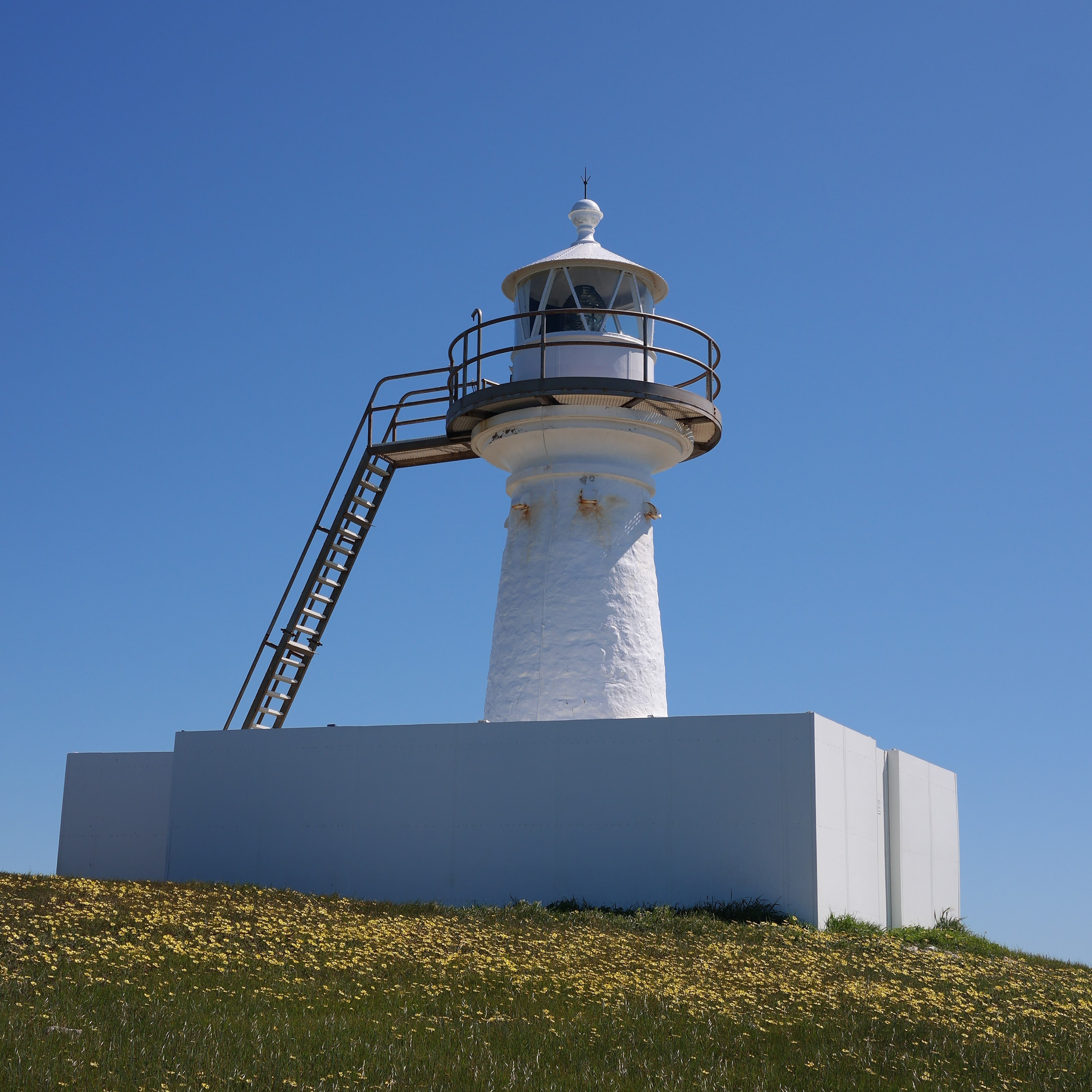
- Cape St Albans Lighthouse

- Coordinates: 35°48′13″S 138°07′26″E
- Country: Australia
- State: South Australia
- City: Willoughby
- Location: 18 km (11 mi) south east of Penneshaw

Cape St Albans (also called Cape St Alban in some sources) is a headland in the Australian state of South Australia located on the north coast of the Dudley Peninsula on Kangaroo Island in the gazetted locality of Willoughby about 18 kilometres (11 miles) south-east of the town of Penneshaw.

The cape is described as lying "about 2.25 nautical miles (4.17 km) N(orth) of Cape Willoughby and extends in a N[ortherly] direction as a narrow neck of land." The cape serves both as the east headland of Antechamber Bay and as the west headland of Moncrieff Bay. It was named after the town of St Albans in Hertfordshire by Thomas Lipson on 21 March 1850. The cape is the site of a navigation aid which was initially a temporary fixed light installed during early 1908 and which was subsequently replaced by a lighthouse that was first lit in November 1908.

As of late 2012, the waters adjoining its shoreline are within the protected area known as the Encounter Marine Park.
