= Antechamber Bay, South Australia =

Antechamber Bay
- Town
- Coordinates: 35.787690°S 138.058680°E
- Country: Australia
- State: South Australia
- Region: Fleurieu and Kangaroo Island
- LGA: Kangaroo Island Council
- Location: 108 km (67 mi) south of Adelaide; 15 km (9.3 mi) east of Penneshaw
- Established: 2002

Government
  - State electorate: Mawson
  - Federal division: Mayo

Population
  - Total: 13 (SAL 2021)
- Time zone: UTC+9:30 (ACST)
  - Summer (DST): UTC+10:30 (ACST)
- Postcode: 5222
- County: Carnarvon
- Mean max temp: 18.1 °C (64.6 °F)
- Mean min temp: 12.8 °C (55.0 °F)
- Annual rainfall: 538.4 mm (21.20 in)
Localities around Antechamber Bay
Cuttlefish Bay	Cuttlefish Bay	Backstairs Passage
Cuttlefish Bay; Dudley East	Antechamber Bay	Backstairs Passage
Dudley East	Willoughby	Willoughby
- Coordinates; Locations; Climate; Adjoining localities

Antechamber Bay is a locality in the Australian state of South Australia located on the north coast of Dudley Peninsula on Kangaroo Island overlooking Backstairs Passage about 108 kilometres (67 miles) south of the state capital of Adelaide and about 15 kilometres (9.3 miles) east of Penneshaw.

Its boundaries were created in March 2002 while its name was derived from Antechamber Bay, a bay located on its coastline with Backstairs Passage.

The main land uses within the locality are agriculture and conservation. The latter land use includes the Lashmar Conservation Park and other land adjoining the coastline which has additional statutory constraints to "conserve the natural features of the coast".

The locality includes a wetland system which is listed on the Directory of Important Wetlands in Australia and consists of two parts – the Lashmar Lagoon which reported as being the “largest lagoon on the eastern end of the island” and the Chapman River which drains into Antechamber Bay.

Antechamber Bay is located within the federal division of Mayo, the state electoral district of Mawson and the local government area of the Kangaroo Island Council.
