= Porky Flat, South Australia =

Porky Flat
- Town
- Coordinates: 35.844680°S 138.030850°E
- Country: Australia
- State: South Australia
- Region: Fleurieu and Kangaroo Island
- LGA: Kangaroo Island Council
- Location: 116 km (72 mi) south of Adelaide; 18 km (11 mi) east of Penneshaw
- Established: 2002

Government
  - State electorate: Mawson
  - Federal division: Mayo

Population
  - Total: 16 (SAL 2021)
- Time zone: UTC+9:30 (ACST)
  - Summer (DST): UTC+10:30 (ACST)
- Postcode: 5222
- County: Carnarvon
- Mean max temp: 18.1 °C (64.6 °F)
- Mean min temp: 12.8 °C (55.0 °F)
- Annual rainfall: 538.4 mm (21.20 in)
Localities around Porky Flat
Dudley East	Dudley East	Dudley East
Willson River	Porky Flat	Willoughby
Ocean	Ocean	Ocean
- Coordinates; Locations; Climate; Adjoining localities

Porky Flat is a locality in the Australian state of South Australia located on the Dudley Peninsula on Kangaroo Island overlooking the body of water known in Australia as the Southern Ocean and by international authorities as the Great Australian Bight. It is located about 116 kilometres (72 miles) south of the state capital of Adelaide and about 18 kilometres (11 miles) south-west of Penneshaw.

Its boundaries were created in March 2002 while its name was derived from Porky Flat, a flat which is now within the boundaries of the locality.

The main land uses within the locality are agriculture and conservation. The latter land use includes two protected areas, the Simpson Conservation Park on the locality's western side and the western part of the Lesueur Conservation Park on the eastern side, an area of privately owned land having protected status due to being subject to native vegetation heritage agreements and other land adjoining the coastline which has additional statutory constraints to “conserve the natural features of the coast.”

Porky Flat is located within the federal division of Mayo, the state electoral district of Mawson and the local government area of the Kangaroo Island Council.
