= Cuttlefish Bay, South Australia =

Cuttlefish Bay
- Town
- Coordinates: 35.743320°S 138.024850°E
- Country: Australia
- State: South Australia
- Region: Fleurieu and Kangaroo Island
- LGA: Kangaroo Island Council
- Location: 106 km (66 mi) south of Adelaide; 8 km (5.0 mi) east of Penneshaw
- Established: 2002

Government
  - State electorate: Mawson
  - Federal division: Mayo

Population
  - Total: 13 (SAL 2021)
- Time zone: UTC+9:30 (ACST)
  - Summer (DST): UTC+10:30 (ACST)
- Postcode: 5222
- County: Carnarvon
- Mean max temp: 18.1 °C (64.6 °F)
- Mean min temp: 12.8 °C (55.0 °F)
- Annual rainfall: 538.4 mm (21.20 in)
Localities around Cuttlefish Bay
Backstairs Passage	Backstairs Passage	Backstairs Passage
Ironstone; Dudley East	Cuttlefish Bay	Backstairs Passage; Antechamber Bay
Dudley East	Dudley East	Antechamber Bay
- Coordinates; Locations; Climate; Adjoining localities

Cuttlefish Bay is a locality in the Australian state of South Australia located on the north coast of Dudley Peninsula on Kangaroo Island overlooking Backstairs Passage about 106 kilometres (66 miles) south of the state capital of Adelaide and about 8 kilometres (5.0 miles) east of Penneshaw. Its boundaries were created in March 2002 while its name was derived from Cuttlefish Bay, a bay located on its coastline with Backstairs Passage. Land use within the locality is concerned with agriculture while land adjoining the coastline has additional statutory constraints to “conserve the natural features of the coast.” Cuttlefish Bay is located within the federal division of Mayo, the state electoral district of Mawson and the local government area of the Kangaroo Island Council.
