= Ironstone, South Australia =

Ironstone
- Town
- Coordinates: 35.7366°S 137.980220°E
- Country: Australia
- State: South Australia
- Region: Fleurieu and Kangaroo Island
- LGA: Kangaroo Island Council
- Location: 107 km (66 mi) south of Adelaide; 3.3 km (2.1 mi) east of Penneshaw
- Established: 2002

Government
  - State electorate: Mawson
  - Federal division: Mayo

Population
  - Total: 20 (SAL 2021)
- Time zone: UTC+9:30 (ACST)
  - Summer (DST): UTC+10:30 (ACST)
- Postcode: 5222
- County: Carnarvon
- Mean max temp: 18.1 °C (64.6 °F)
- Mean min temp: 12.8 °C (55.0 °F)
- Annual rainfall: 538.4 mm (21.20 in)
Localities around Ironstone
| Backstairs Passage | Backstairs Passage | Backstairs Passage |
| Penneshaw; Dudley East | Ironstone | Cuttlefish Bay |
| Dudley East | Dudley East | Cuttlefish Bay |
- Coordinates; Locations; Climate; Adjoinig localities

Ironstone is a locality in the Australian state of South Australia located on the north coast of Dudley Peninsula on Kangaroo Island overlooking Backstairs Passage about 107 kilometres (66 miles) south of the state capital of Adelaide and about 3 kilometres (1.9 miles) east of Penneshaw.

Its boundaries were created in March 2002 while its name was derived from Ironstone Hill, a hill located within its boundaries.

Land use within the locality is divided between agriculture and conservation. The former land use includes land adjoining the coastline which has additional statutory constraints to “conserve the natural features of the coast.” The latter land use is concerned with the Baudin Conservation Park which is located in the north-west corner of the locality.

The locality includes the following places which are listed on the South Australian Heritage Register: Bates Farmhouse and Threshing Floor (Ironstone)

Ironstone is located within the federal division of Mayo, the state electoral district of Mawson and the local government area of the Kangaroo Island Council.

== See also ==
- Ironstone (disambiguation)
