= Willoughby =

Willoughby (/ˈwɪləbi/ WIL-ə-bee) may refer to:

== Places ==
=== Antigua ===
- Willoughby Bay (Antigua), on the southeast coast of Antigua

=== Australia ===
- Willoughby, New South Wales, a suburb of Sydney
  - Willoughby Girls High School
- City of Willoughby, a local government area of New South Wales
- Electoral district of Willoughby, New South Wales
- Parish of Willoughby, Cumberland, New South Wales
- Willoughby, South Australia, a locality on Kangaroo Island
  - Cape Willoughby, a headland in South Australia

=== Canada ===
- Willoughby, Langley, British Columbia, a community within the Township of Langley
- Willoughby Township, Ontario

=== United Kingdom ===
- Willoughby, Lincolnshire, a village
  - Willoughby railway station
- Willoughby on the Wolds, Nottinghamshire
- Willoughby, Warwickshire, a village and civil parish
- Willoughby Waterleys, Leicestershire

=== United States ===
- Willoughby, Ohio, a city and a suburb of Cleveland
- Willoughby, Albemarle County, Virginia, an unincorporated community
- Willoughby Park, Friendship Heights, Washington, D.C.
- Willoughby Run, a waterway in Adams County, Pennsylvania
- Willoughby Spit, a peninsula in Norfolk, Virginia
- Willoughby State Forest, Vermont
- Lake Willoughby, Westmore, Vermont

=== Elsewhere ===
- Willoughby's Land, elusive islands thought to be north of the Barents Sea

== Hydronyms ==
- Willoughby River, Vermont, United States

== People ==
- Willoughby (surname), a list
- Willoughby (given name), a list

== Fiction ==
- Willoughby (Looney Tunes), an animated character from Looney Tunes
- Inspector Willoughby, an animated character from The Woody Woodpecker Show
- John Willoughby, one of the main characters in Jane Austen's novel Sense and Sensibility
- The Willoughbys, a book written by Lois Lowry.
- The title character of the short-lived 1999 British sitcom Dr Willoughby
- Willoughby, Texas, a fictional town featured in Revolution (TV series)
- "A Stop at Willoughby", an episode from the first season of The Twilight Zone, which features a town called Willoughby
- A character in the novel Evelina by Fanny Burney
- A character in Celestina (novel) by Charlotte Smith
- The Willoughbys, a 2020 comedy film
- Violet Willoughby, the main character in the novel Haunting Violet

== English/British titles ==
- Baron Willoughby de Broke, a barony by writ in the peerage of England since 1491
- Baron Willoughby de Eresby, a barony by writ in the peerage of England, dating to 1313
- Baron Willoughby of Parham, a title in the peerage of England from 1547 until 1779
- Willoughby baronets, four titles

== Music ==
- Willoughby Tucker, I'll Always Love You, a 2025 studio album by Ethel Cain

== Other uses ==
- USS Willoughby, the name of more than one United States Navy ship
- Willoughby Delta 8, a twin-engined aerodynamic test bed for a proposed flying wing airliner

== See also ==
- Willoughby East, New South Wales, Australia, a suburb of Sydney
- Willoughby on the Wolds, Nottinghamshire, England
- Willoughby Waterleys, Leicestershire, England
- Willoughby Hills, Ohio, U.S.
