= James Willoughby (disambiguation) =

James Willoughby is a baseball pitcher.

James Willoughby may refer to:

- James Willoughby, heir to Baron Middleton, of Middleton in the County of Warwick
- James Willoughby, character in The Regiment (TV series)

== See also ==
- James Heathcote-Drummond-Willoughby, 3rd Earl of Ancaster
- Willoughby (surname)
