= Lesueur Conservation Park =

Protected area in South Australia

- IUCN category Ia (strict nature reserve)
- Location within South Australia
- Location: South Australia
- Nearest city: Penneshaw
- Coordinates: 35°51′34.73″S 138°03′47.81″E
- Area: 14.14 km^{2} (5.46 sq mi)
- Established: 21 January 1971
- Governing body: Department for Environment and Water

Lesueur Conservation Park, formerly the Cape Hart Conservation Park and the Cape Hart National Park, is a protected area in the Australian state of South Australia located on the Dudley Peninsula on Kangaroo Island.

It was dedicated in 1971 to conserve a representative example of the soils and coastal vegetation of the southern part of the eastern end of the island. It is characterised by impressive coastal cliff scenery. Its name was changed on 28 March 2002 in honour of Charles Alexandre Lesueur, a member of the Baudin expedition to Australia.

== Description ==
The conservation park has an area of 14.14 square kilometres (5.46 mi^{2}) including a 2 kilometres (1.2 mi) length of coastline. It lies about 4.5 kilometres (2.8 miles) south-west of Cape Willoughby, the easternmost point of Kangaroo Island, and 15 km south-east of the town of Penneshaw. Geologically, the conservation park lies on sandstone, with granite boulders along the coast. The vegetation is mainly an open scrub of Eucalyptus diversifolia (soap mallee), with low shrubland containing Melaleuca gibbosa on the coastal cliffs. There are patches of Eucalyptus cneorifolia / Melaleuca uncinata open heath and Allocasuarina verticillata low open forest. Kangaroo Island kangaroos and tammar wallabies inhabit the conservation park and Australian sea lions frequent the coast.

The conservation park is classified as an IUCN Category Ia protected area.

== See also ==
- Cape Willoughby Conservation Park
- Protected areas of South Australia
