= Hylaeus melaleucae =

Scientific classification
- Kingdom: Animalia
- Phylum: Arthropoda
- Clade: Pancrustacea
- Class: Insecta
- Order: Hymenoptera
- Family: Colletidae
- Genus: Hylaeus
- Species: H. melaleucae

Binomial name
- Hylaeus melaleucae Rayment, 1953

Species of bee

Hylaeus melaleucae is a species of bee in the family Colletidae and subfamily Hylaeinae. It is endemic to Australia. It was described by Australian entomologist Tarlton Rayment in 1953.

== Description ==
Female body length is about 5 mm. Integumental colouration is black and glossy.

== Distribution and habitat ==
The species occurs in south-eastern Australia. The type locality is Gorae West in south-west Victoria.

== Behaviour ==
The adults are flying mellivores. Flowering plants visited by the bees include Melaleuca gibbosa.

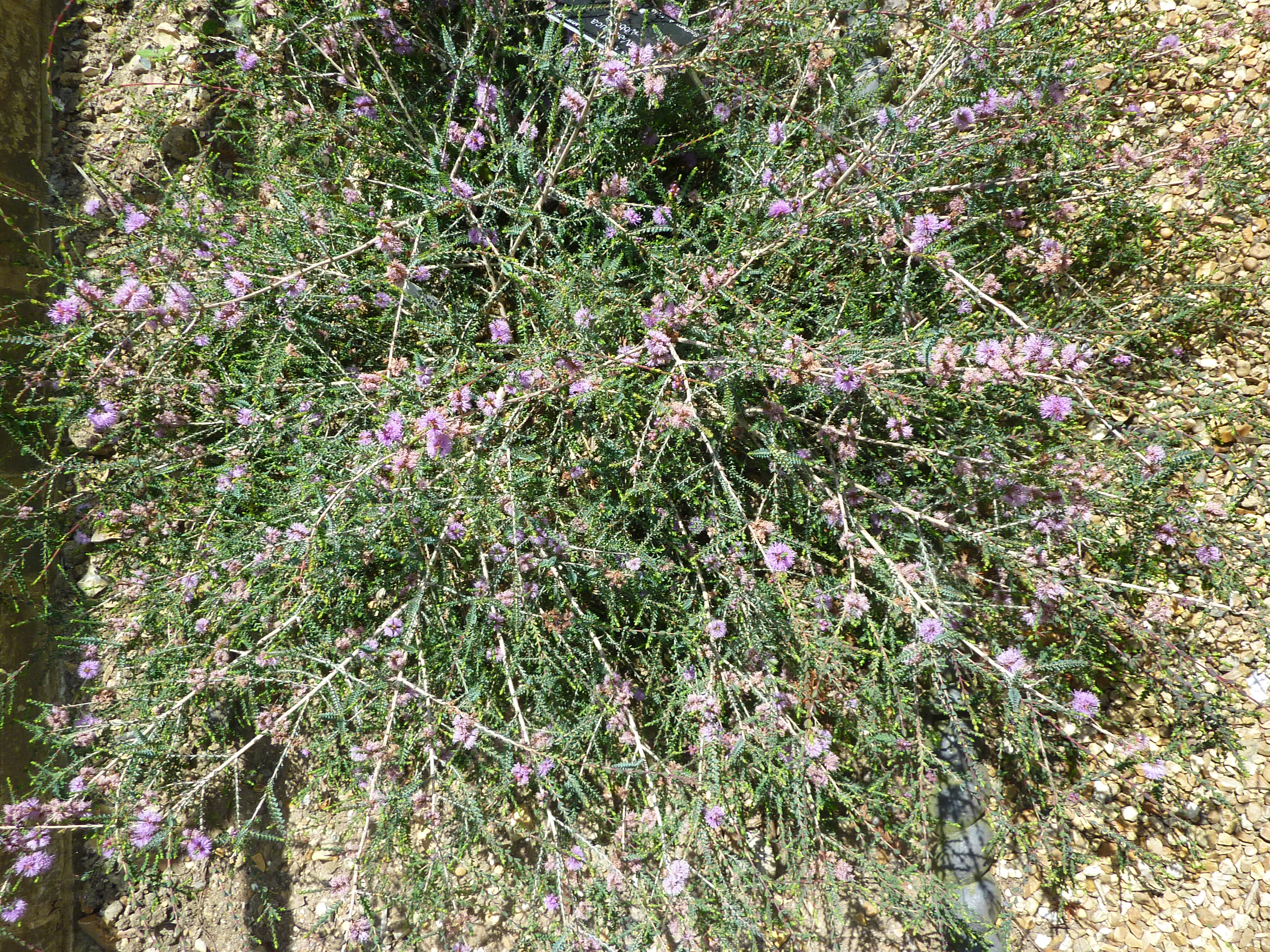
Melaleuca gibbosa (slender honey-myrtle), a forage plant of the bees

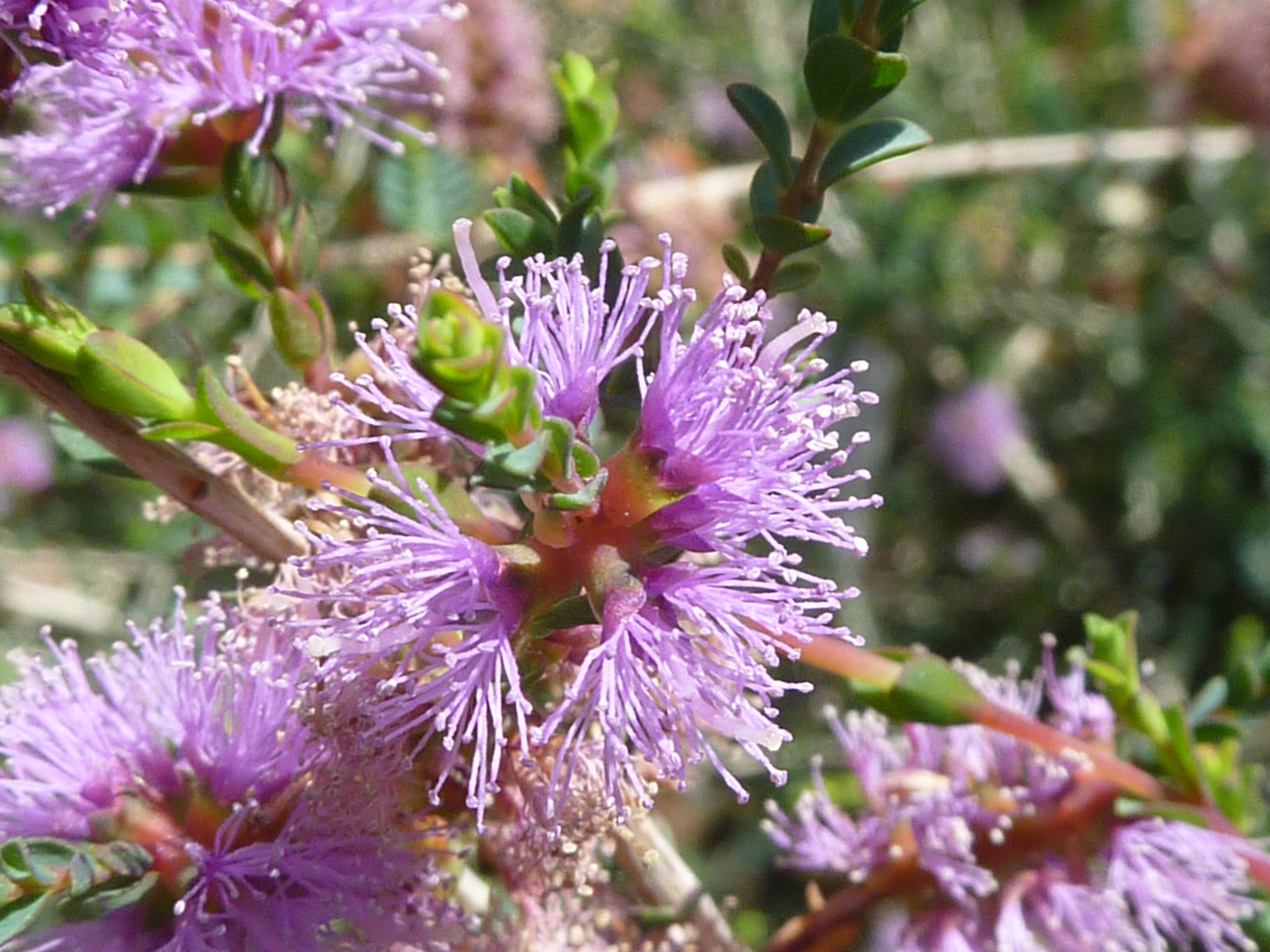
Melaleuca gibbosa flowers
