= Willoughby, South Australia =

Willoughby
- Town
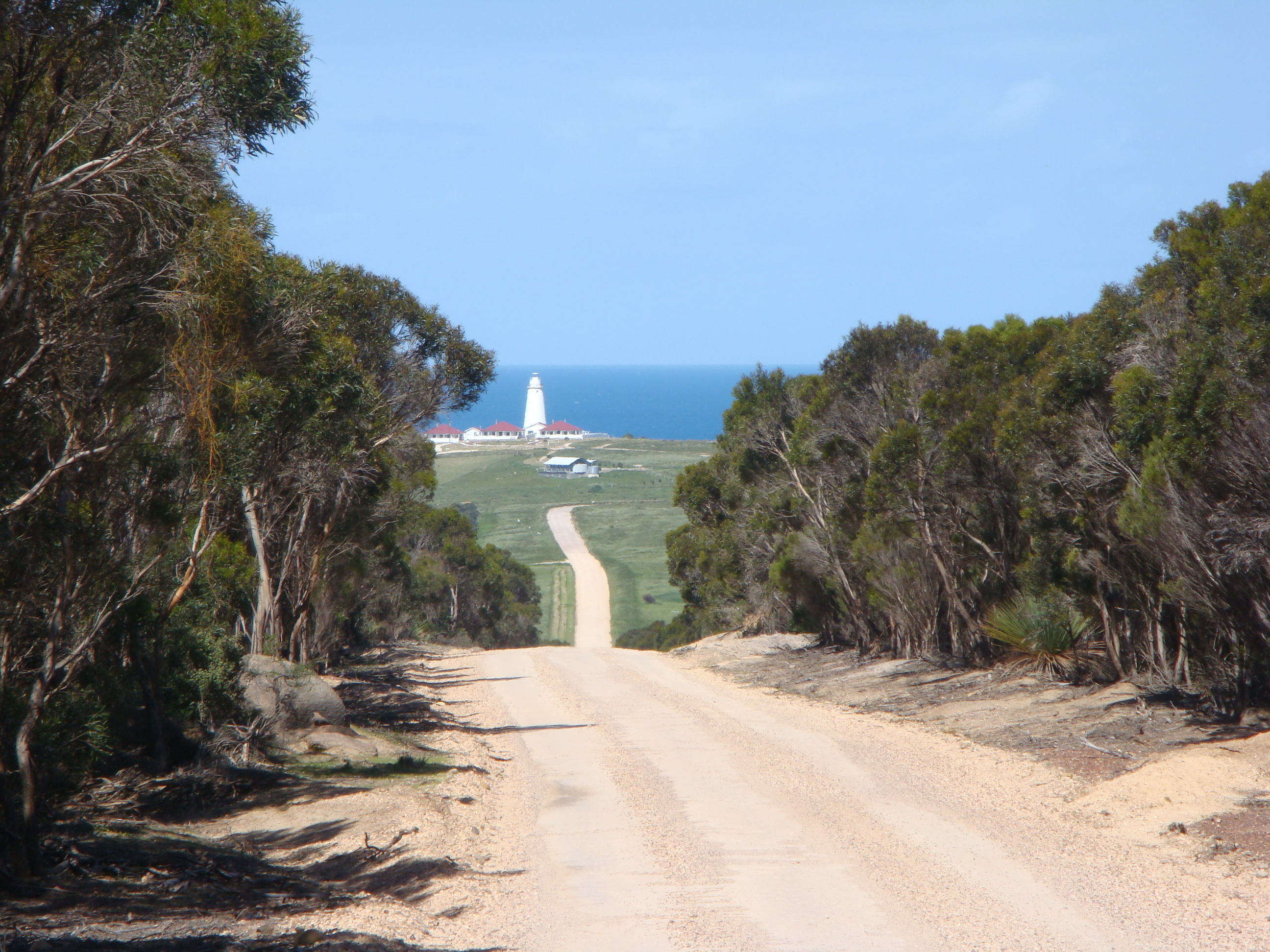
- Cape Willoughby Lighthouse

- Coordinates: 35.831410°S 138.098680°E
- Country: Australia
- State: South Australia
- Region: Fleurieu and Kangaroo Island
- LGA: Kangaroo Island Council
- Location: 111 km (69 mi) south of Adelaide; 18 km (11 mi) east of Penneshaw
- Established: 1999

Government
  - State electorate: Mawson
  - Federal division: Mayo

Population
  - Total: 11 (SAL 2016)
- Time zone: UTC+9:30 (ACST)
  - Summer (DST): UTC+10:30 (ACST)
- Postcode: 5222
- County: County of Carnarvon
- Mean max temp: 18.1 °C (64.6 °F)
- Mean min temp: 12.8 °C (55.0 °F)
- Annual rainfall: 538.4 mm (21.20 in)
Localities around Willoughby
Antechamber Bay	Backstairs Passage	Backstairs Passage
Antechamber Bay; Dudley East; Porky Flat	Willoughby	Ocean
Porky Flat	Ocean	Ocean
- Coordinates; Locations; Climate; Adjoining localities

Willoughby is a locality in the Australian state of South Australia located at the eastern end of Dudley Peninsula on Kangaroo Island overlooking Backstairs Passage to the north and overlooking the body of water known in Australia as the Southern Ocean and by international authorities as the Great Australian Bight to the south. It is located about 111 kilometres (69 miles) south of the state capital of Adelaide and about 18 kilometres (11 miles) east of Penneshaw.

Its boundaries were created in August 1999 while its name was derived from Cape Willoughby, the headland at the eastern end of the Dudley Peninsula.

The main land uses within the locality are agriculture and conservation. The latter land use includes the Cape Willoughby Conservation Park, the eastern part of the Lesueur Conservation Park and other land adjoining the coastline which has additional statutory constraints to “conserve the natural features of the coast.”

The locality includes the following two places which are listed on the South Australian Heritage Register - Cape Willoughby Lighthouse (tower only), and the ‘Freshfields’ farmhouse and the graves of Nathaniel Thomas and his wife, both pre-colonial settlers.

Willoughby is located within the federal division of Mayo, the state electoral district of Mawson and the local government area of the Kangaroo Island Council.

== See also ==
- Willoughby (disambiguation)
- Pink Bay
