= Simpson Conservation Park =

Protected area in South Australia

- IUCN category Ia (strict nature reserve)
- Location within South Australia
- Location: South Australia
- Nearest city: Penneshaw.
- Coordinates: 35°51′22″S 137°59′45″E
- Area: 977 ha (2,410 acres)
- Established: 9 October 1986
- Governing body: Department for Environment and Water

Simpson Conservation Park (formerly the Simpson Conservation Reserve) is a protected area in the Australian state of South Australia located in the locality of Porkys Flat on Dudley Peninsula on Kangaroo Island about 13 kilometres (8.1 miles) south of Penneshaw. The conservation park was proclaimed under the National Parks and Wildlife Act 1972 in 2010 over crown land previously dedicated as a conservation reserve in 1986. The conservation park is classified as an IUCN Category Ia protected area.
