= Cape Jervis (headland) =

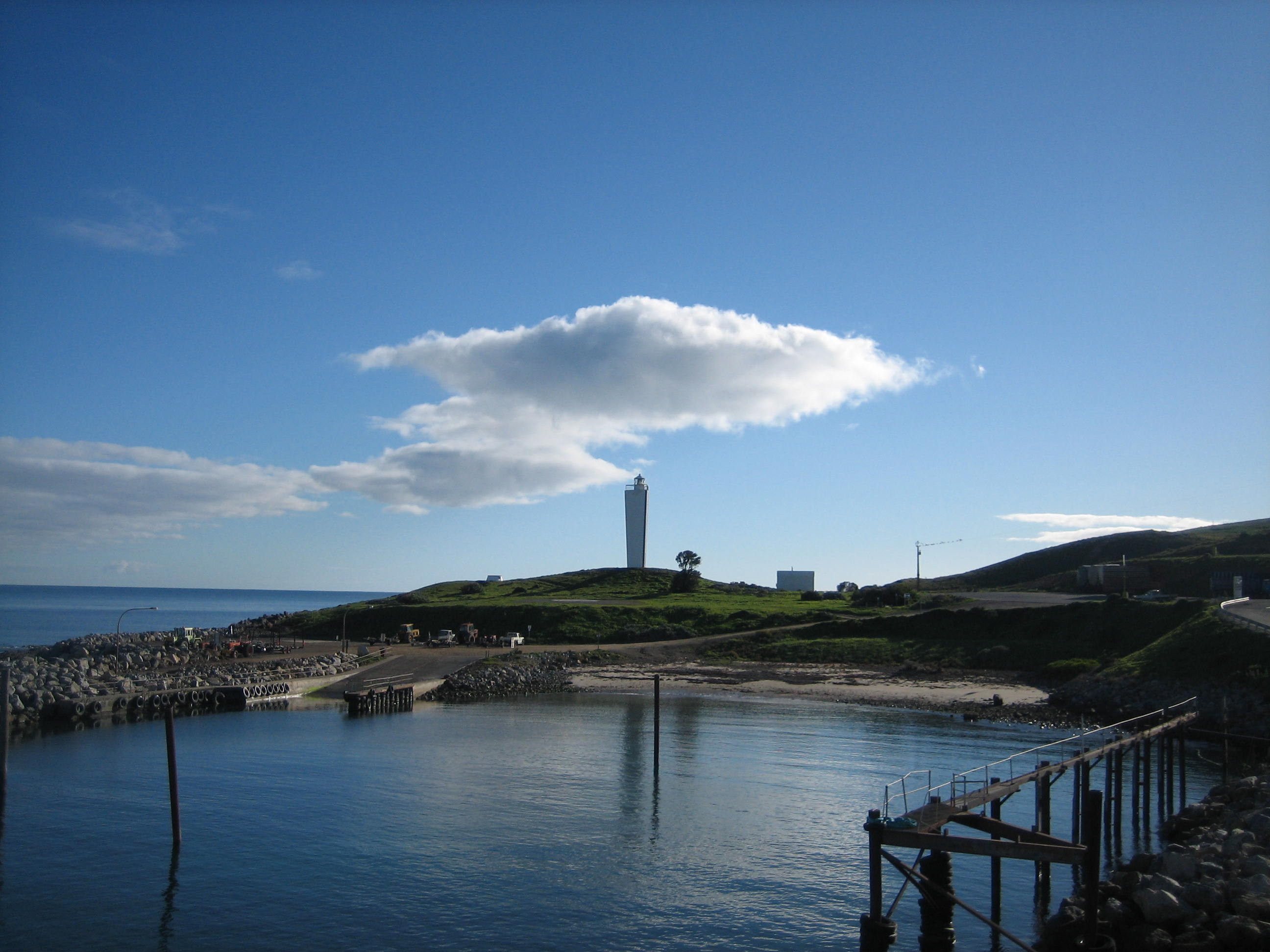
- Sealink Terminal, Cape Jervis

- Coordinates: 35°36′17″S 138°05′34″E
- Country: Australia
- State: South Australia
- City: Cape Jervis
- Location: 0.7 km (0.43 mi) west of Cape Jervis

Cape Jervis is a headland located at the most westerly part of the Fleurieu Peninsula on the east coast of Gulf St Vincent in South Australia about 0.7 kilometres (0.43 miles) west of the town of the same name, Cape Jervis. It is the eastern end of the opening to Gulf St Vincent.

The cape is described by one source as being:

...a high bold headland having but little vegetation. It is intersected by gullies and has several cliffy projections. The W, and most prominent, of these projections, referred to as The Cape, does not present so steep a face to the sea as the other projections, but slopes down, gradually, from the heights inland, of which Tree Hill, 345 metres (1,132 feet) high, 3 nautical miles (5.6 kilometres; 3.5 miles) ESE of Cape Jervis, is the most prominent.

It was known by local Aboriginal people as "Parewarangk", this being a Ngarrindjeri adaptation of the Kaurna name Pariwarangga. The Baudin expedition to Australia visited the cape after Flinders and gave it two names, "Cap D'Alembert" and "Cap De La Secheresse", with the former being the one recorded in the expedition's official log. It was named Cape Jervis by the British explorer, Matthew Flinders, after John Jervis, 1st Earl of St Vincent on 23 March 1802.

A shore-based bay whaling station, run by John Haynes, was in operation at Fishery Beach by 1842. The fishery was purchased by a Mr Baker for £126 in March 1845. By 1850 a Mr Barnett had the fishery and it was run for him by a Mr Clark. It was owned by Messrs Boord, Bennett and Johnson in 1851. That seems to have been the last year it was in operation.

Since 1871, it has been the site of a navigation aid in the form of a lighthouse. Immediately south of the lighthouse, there is a boat harbor with a jetty of 120 metres (390 feet) length which serves as the port used by Kangaroo Island SeaLink who operates the ferry service to Penneshaw on Kangaroo Island. Since 2012, the waters adjoining its shoreline are within the Encounter Marine Park.
