= Ironstone (disambiguation) =

Ironstone is a type of sedimentary rock.

Ironstone may also refer to:

- Ironstone (band), an Australian music group formed in 2016
- Joe Ironstone (1898–1972), Canadian professional ice hockey player
- Ironstone Bank, a community bank in the southern United States
- Ironstone china, a type of tableware
- Ironstone Creek, a tributary of the Manatawny Creek in Pennsylvania
- Ironstone, Massachusetts, United States, a village
- Ironstone, South Australia, a locality on Kangaroo Island
- Ironstone Mountain, in the central highlands of Tasmania, Australia
- Ironstone Vineyards, a winery in California, United States
