= Backstairs Passage =

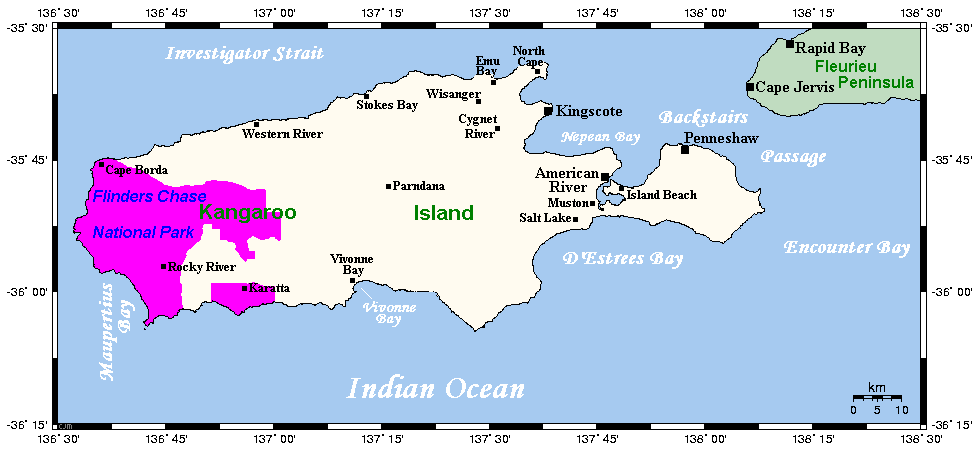
- Location of Backstairs Passage between the eastern end of Kangaroo Island and the Fleurieu Peninsula

- Location in South Australia
- Location: South Australia
- Coordinates: 35°41′1″S 138°4′23″E
- Type: strait
- Basin countries: Australia
- Max. depth: 73 metres (240 ft)
- Islands: The Pages
- Settlements: Cape Jervis, Penneshaw

The Backstairs Passage is a strait in South Australia lying between Fleurieu Peninsula on the Australian mainland and Dudley Peninsula on the eastern end of Kangaroo Island. The western edge of the passage is a line from Cape Jervis on Fleurieu Peninsula to Kangaroo Head (west of Penneshaw) on Kangaroo Island. The Pages, a group of islets, lie in the eastern entrance to the strait. About 14 km wide at its narrowest, it was formed by the rising sea around 13,000 years ago, at the end of the Pleistocene era, when it submerged the land connecting what is now Kangaroo Island with the Fleurieu Peninsula. Backstairs Passage was named by Matthew Flinders whilst he and his crew on HMS Investigator were exploring and mapping the coastline of South Australia in 1802.

== Etymology ==
Backstairs Passage was named by Matthew Flinders on 7 April 1802 whilst he and his crew on HMS Investigator were exploring and mapping the coastline of South Australia. Flinders noted that this body of water is separate from Investigator Strait and that "it forms a private entrance, as it were, to the two gulphs; and I named it Back-stairs Passage."

== History ==
The coastal processes occurring in Gulf St Vincent and along the southern coastline of Fleurieu Peninsula are complex. Due to the relatively shallow Gulf St Vincent joining the Southern Ocean through the deeper Backstairs Passage, this narrow and dangerous channel is subjected to strong currents, heavy tidal swells and steep breaking seas.

In the early years following European colonisation many of the nearly fifty vessels wrecked in the hazardous waters around Kangaroo Island were lost while crossing Backstairs Passage to and from the mainland. This led to South Australia's first lighthouse, the Sturt Light, being built in 1851 at Cape Willoughby on the eastern tip of Kangaroo Island. In addition to vessels navigating the treacherous crossing to and from the mainland, sailing ships (commonly wooden barques) making use of the Roaring Forties trade winds on voyaging to South Australia could be propelled by the prevailing winds into Backstairs Passage, or as far Bass Strait.

On 6 June 1995, South Australian marathon swimmer Andrew Martin completed the first recorded solo crossing of Backstairs Passage, covering the 14.25 km distance in 4 hours 31 minutes 30 seconds.

=== Shipwrecks ===
- San Pareille - brigantine wrecked between Cape Jervis and Lands End on 30 January 1855.
- Vanquish - schooner wrecked near Fishery Beach in early December 1864.
- Thistle - schooner wrecked near Cape Jervis in 1866.
- Hopper Barge No.3 - hopper barge sunk at Lands End on 21 October 1880 during the operation to refloat the stranded SS Sorata.
- Ferret - fishing cutter wrecked at Waitpinga Beach in December 1932.
- Grelka - schooner wrecked near Cape St Alban, Kangaroo Island, on 25 January 1955.
- Galini - crayboat wrecked near the Pages during November 1981.
- Olive Florence - wooden sailing vessel started to leak and foundered in heavy seas, between Cape Jervis and Emu Bay, 30 May 1994.

==== 2005 sea kayaking deaths ====
On 30 July 2005, two inexperienced sea kayakers drowned in Backstairs Passage.

== Protected areas ==
Protected areas located within and adjoining the strait’s extent include:

- Conservation parks - The Pages at the strait’s east end, Baudin, Lashmar and Cape Willoughby on the Kangaroo Island coast, and Deep Creek and Newland Head on the Fleurieu Peninsula coast.
- Marine parks - Encounter Marine Park
