= Dudley East, South Australia =

Dudley East
- Town
- Coordinates: 35.787070°S 137.954780°E
- Country: Australia
- State: South Australia
- Region: Fleurieu and Kangaroo Island
- LGA: Kangaroo Island Council
- Location: 109 km (68 mi) south of Adelaide
- Established: 2002

Government
  - State electorate: Mawson
  - Federal division: Mayo

Population
  - Total: 58 (SAL 2021)
- Time zone: UTC+9:30 (ACST)
  - Summer (DST): UTC+10:30 (ACST)
- Postcode: 5222
- County: Carnarvon
- Mean max temp: 18.1 °C (64.6 °F)
- Mean min temp: 12.8 °C (55.0 °F)
- Annual rainfall: 538.4 mm (21.20 in)
Localities around Dudley East
Kangaroo Head	Penneshaw; Ironstone	Cuttlefish Bay
Kangaroo Head; Dudley West	Dudley East	Cuttlefish Bay; Antechamber Bay
Dudley West	Willson River; Porky Flat	Willoughby
- Coordinates; Locations; Climate; Adjoining localities

Dudley East is a locality in the Australian state of South Australia located on the Dudley Peninsula on Kangaroo Island about 107 kilometres (66 miles) south of the state capital of Adelaide.

Its boundaries were created in March 2002 for the “long established name.” The locality is reported as being so named because it is located in the eastern part of the cadastral unit of the Hundred of Dudley.

The principal land use within the locality is agriculture. The locality includes the Rock Villa, Hog Bay River Station which is listed on the South Australian Heritage Register.

Dudley East is located within the federal division of Mayo, the state electoral district of Mawson and the local government area of the Kangaroo Island Council.

== See also ==
- Dudley (disambiguation)
