= Alexander Bain Moncrieff =

Irish engineer (1845–1928)

Alexander Bain Moncrieff CMG
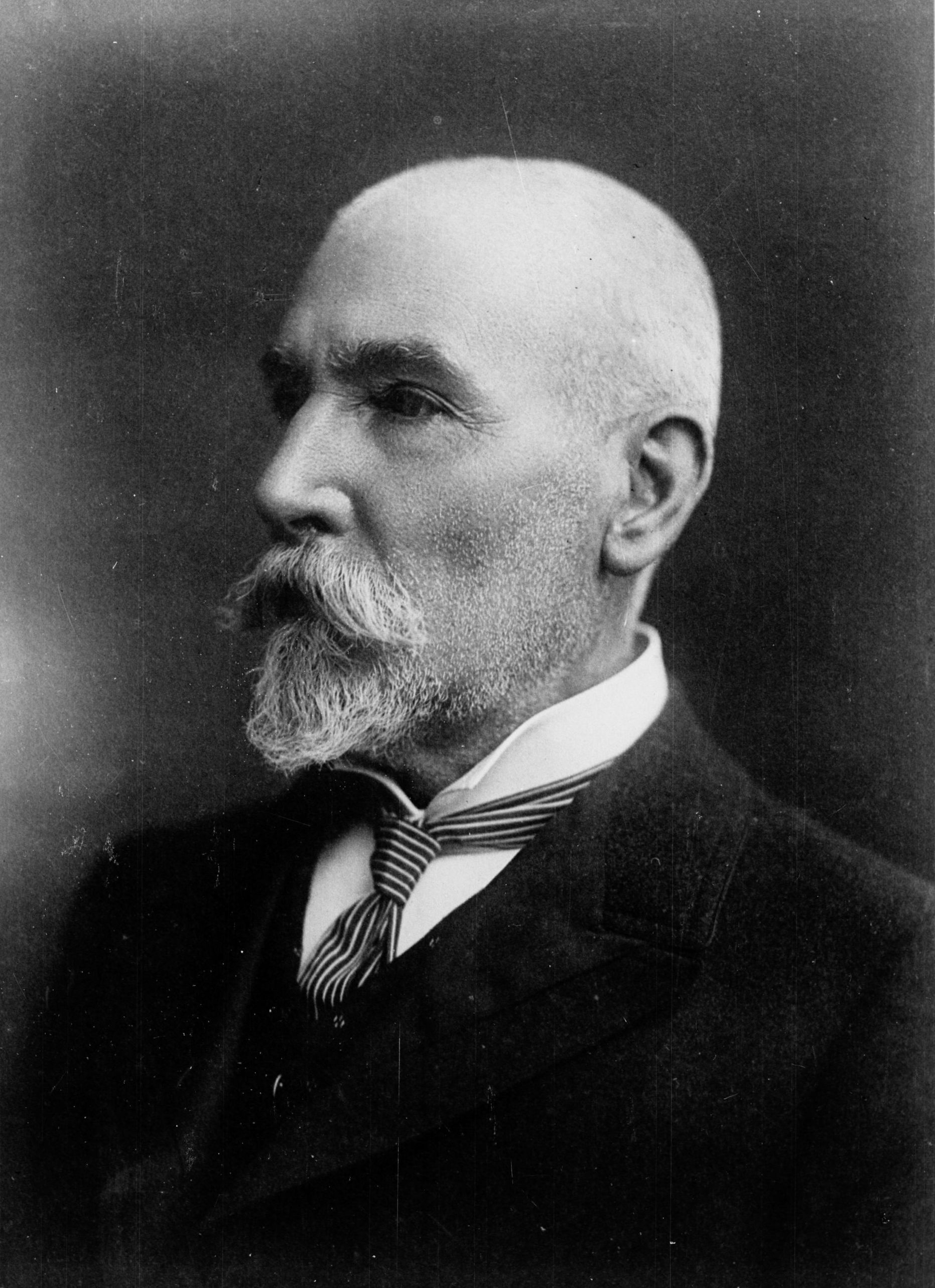
- Moncrieff, c. 1915
- Born: 22 May 1845; Dublin, Ireland
- Died: 11 April 1928 (aged 82); Adelaide, South Australia, Australia
- Occupation: Engineer
- Years active: 1860–1922
- Spouse: Mary Benson (m. 1877)

Alexander Bain Moncrieff CMG (22 May 1845 – 11 April 1928) was an Irish-born engineer, active in Australia.

== See also ==
- Moncrieff Bay
- William Alfred Webb
