= Cape Willoughby Conservation Park =

Protected area in South Australia

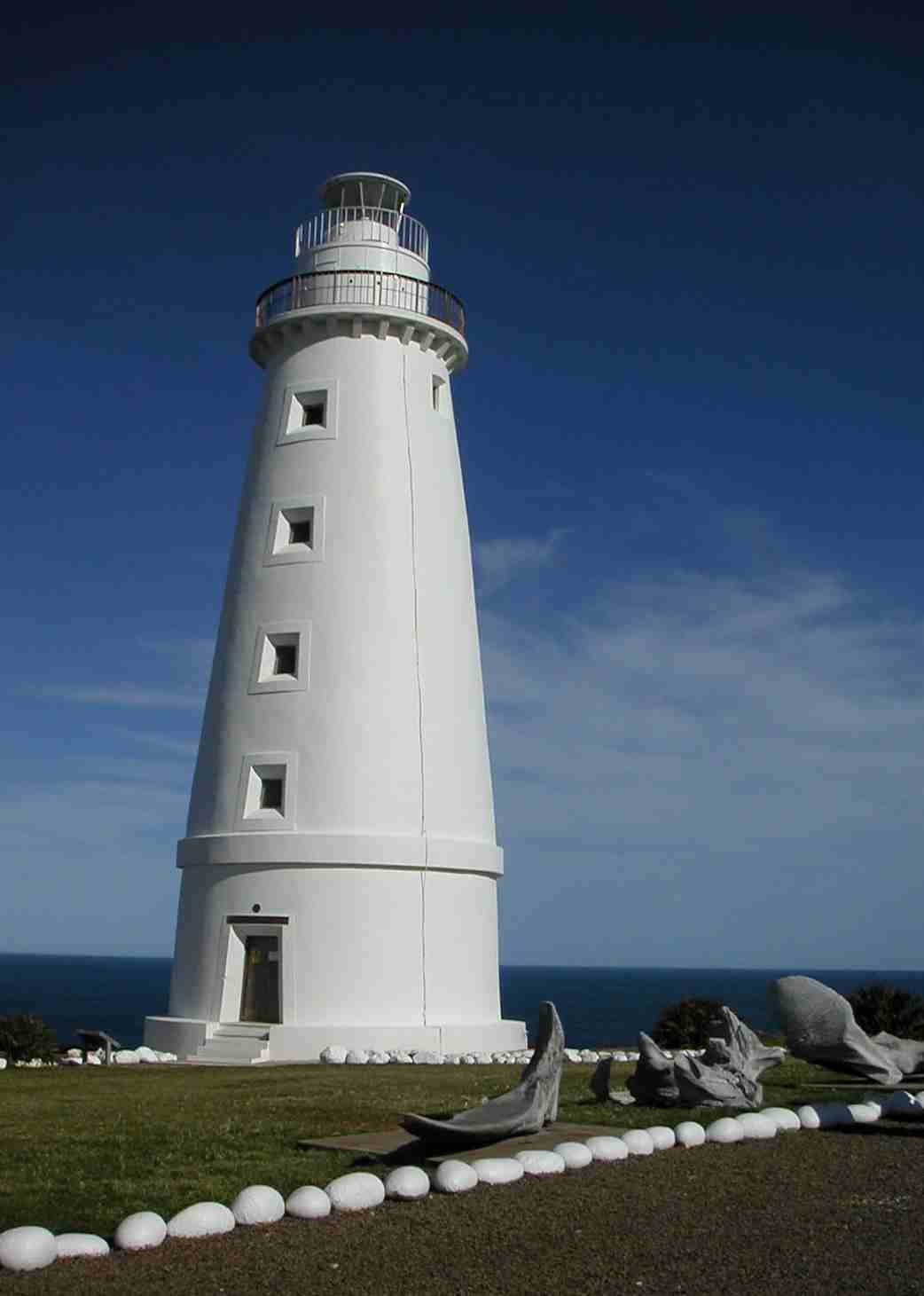
- Cape Willoughby Lightstation

- Location within South Australia
- Location: South Australia
- Nearest city: Penneshaw
- Coordinates: 35°50′26″S 138°07′50″E
- Area: 18 ha (44 acres)
- Established: 21 January 1971
- Governing body: Department for Environment and Water
- Website: http://www.environment.sa.gov.au/parks/Find_a_Park/Browse_by_region/Kangaroo_Island/Cape_Willoughby

Cape Willoughby Conservation Park, formerly part of the Cape Hart Conservation Park, is a protected area in the Australian state of South Australia located on the north coast of the Dudley Peninsula on Kangaroo Island in the gazetted locality of Willoughby about 27 kilometres (17 miles) south east of Penneshaw.

It consists of land in section 412 in the cadastral unit of the Hundred of Dudley which was part of the former Cape Hart Conservation Park and had been added to the former protected area after 1987. The former protected area had been proclaimed under the National Parks Act 1966 on 21 January 1971 as the Cape Hart National Park and was sub-divided on 28 March 2002 into the Cape Willoughby Conservation Park and the Lesueur Conservation Park. As of December 2016, it covered an area of 18 hectares (44 acres).

The conservation park consists of land bounded by the coastline to the north and to the east. The Cape Willoughby Lighthouse complex is located at the conservation park's eastern end overlooking the coastline and at the end of a road known as the Cape Willoughby Road. Services for visitors include accommodation in two of the former lighthouse keepers cottages and a walking trail known as the Cape Willoughby Lightstation heritage hike.

As of 2014, the conservation park had not been given an IUCN protected area category.
