= Lashmar Conservation Park =

Protected area in South Australia

- IUCN category III (natural monument or feature)
- Location within South Australia
- Location: South Australia
- Nearest city: Penneshaw
- Coordinates: 35°46′49″S 138°3′47″E
- Area: 3.59 km^{2} (1.39 sq mi)
- Established: 16 September 1993
- Governing body: Department for Environment and Water
- Website: Official website

Lashmar Conservation Park is a protected area located on the north coast of Dudley Peninsula on Kangaroo Island in South Australia about 40 kilometres (25 miles) south-east of Penneshaw. It was proclaimed under the National Parks and Wildlife Act 1972 in 1993. The Lashmar Lagoon, which is considered to be a significant wetland, is located within the boundaries of the conservation park. The conservation park is classified as an IUCN Category III protected area.
