= Willoughby Park =

Coordinates: 38°57′45.1″N 77°5′21.4″W

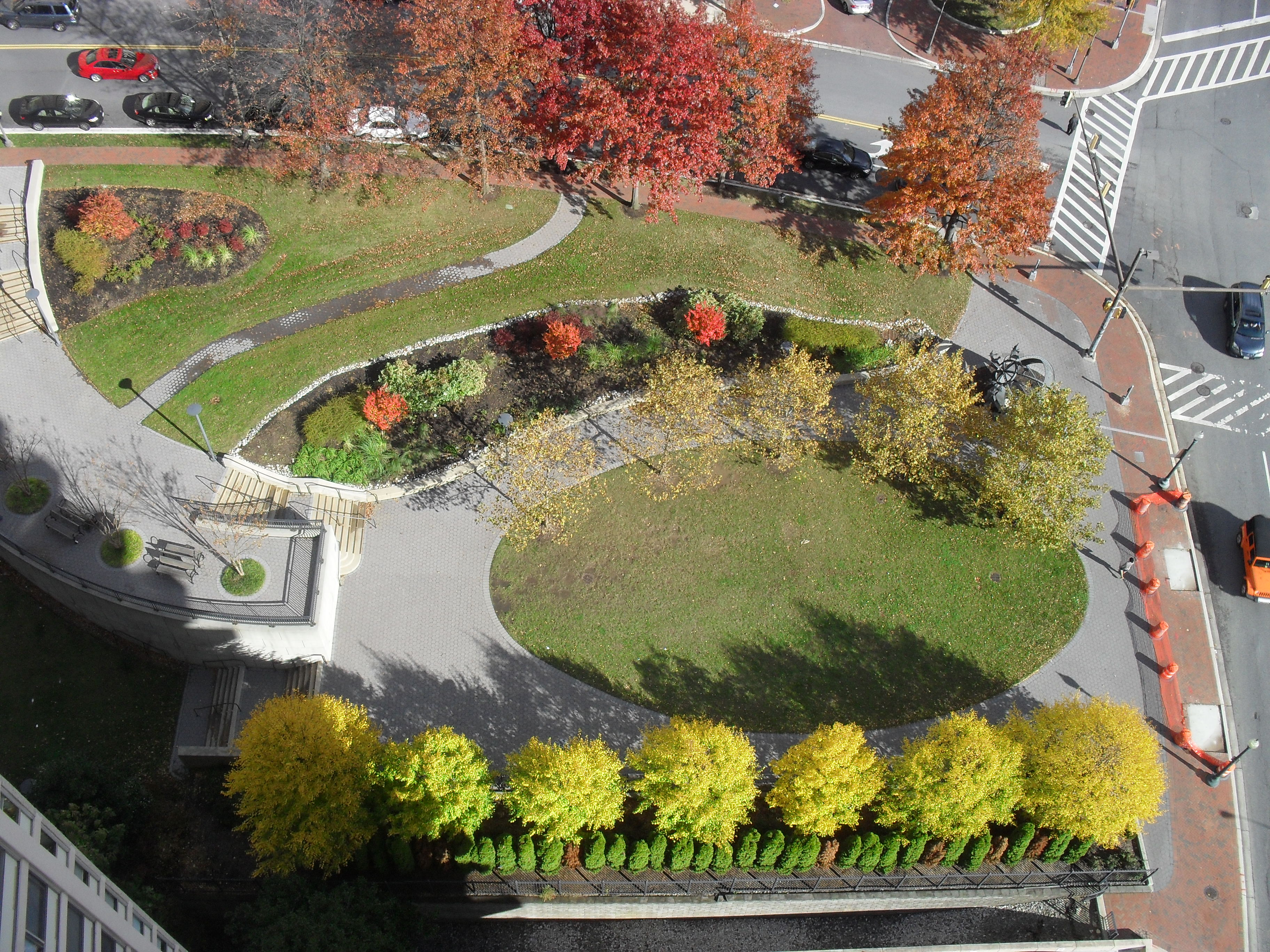
Willoughby Park - as seen from above

Willoughby Park is a city park in Friendship Heights, an incorporated area on the edge of Washington, D.C. Named after the adjacent Willoughby Condominium Building, it is at the intersection of Willard Ave and Friendship Boulevard. It is served by the Friendship Heights metro and bus station of the Washington Metro, which is located two blocks from the park.

Designed by Robert (Bob) Good, of Stephenson & Good Landscape Architecture, the park is characterized by its location in the midst of high-rise luxury condominium buildings. While there is some traffic noise, the park is generally quiet with few users. Sharing the intersection is a Chipotle Restaurant, the edge of the Geico Corporate campus, and another park directly across the street.

== Features ==
The park is heavily terraced, and slopes downhill from Friendship Blvd. There are many flights of stairs and ledges. There are many growing trees, a grassy oval, paved brick surface, and benches located throughout the park. There is an iron armillary sphere sculpture that weighs 5,000 pounds with mythological creatures and birds sitting atop sculpted white clouds and black marble. The sculpture by Steven Weitzman is said to be based on ancient ways of reading the universe.

== History ==
In the 19th century, this land was part of the Shoemaker Farm. After the construction of the adjacent Willoughby condo, this land was known as Willoughby Gulch, and consisted of a steep grassy slope leading 40 vertical feet up to the street level from the side of the building. The land had been acquired for the construction of the Willoughby Condominium and plans called for construction of a third tower in this location. In April 2001 the park was renamed and redeveloped by JBG Co. as part of JBG's office and retail project to build the Chase Tower Complex (across the street).

In 2009, the park hosted the Capital Bocking USA event, where free lessons were given for walking on stilts.
