= Haunting Violet =

- First edition (publ. Walker Books)
- Author: Alyxandra Harvey
- Language: English
- Publisher: Walker
- Publication date: 24 May 2011
- Publication place: Canada
- ISBN: 9780802798398
- OCLC: 664450564
- LC Class: PZ7.H267448 Hau

Haunting Violet is a paranormal novel by Alyxandra Harvey. It was first published on May 24, 2011 by Walker & Co. The novel is set in 1872 and incorporates elements of Victorian spiritualism.

The main character, Violet Willoughby, is the daughter of a fraudulent medium. For years she has taken part in her mother's faked seances, pretending to put the rich and powerful in touch with the dead, and their success has brought them a life of luxury they could only have dreamed of and Violet the prospect of a society marriage. But Violet has a real, unsuspected power to see the dead, and begins to be haunted day and night by the ghost of a drowned girl who will not let her rest until her murderer is uncovered.

== Plot summary ==
Violet's mother is a fraud: she pretends she has the gift and holds seances for the gentry who hold her in esteem as a celebrity of the day. It is these bogus talents that earn Violet and her mother an invitation to Rosefield, Lord Jasper's country estate. Mrs Willoughby is to entertain his guests, and Violet is her unwilling accomplice. Rosefield is a new beginning for Violet though, as it is here that she discovers that she truly does have the gift of seeing the dead. Violet tries to fight against it as she knows that her mother will think nothing of exploiting her only child.

One of the ghosts that Violet sees is pretty terrifying. Rowena was the daughter of one of Lord Jasper's neighbours who apparently drowned, leaving behind her sister Tabitha. It soon becomes clear that Rowena was murdered, and the only way that she will leave Violet alone is if she can reveal the identity of her killer. However, due to her cruel death, Rowena cannot speak directly to Violet so must expose her murderer with small clues and leave Violet to uncover the rest.

Furthermore, Violet has to strive to keep the attention of Mr Tretheway, a possible marriage suitor, all whilst struggling with her increasing feelings towards her childhood friend Colin.

Violet wants justice for Rowena but soon finds herself the victim of several 'accidents'. Rowena's murderer is clearly willing to silence Violet if it will keep their identity secret, so Violet must find them before they end her.

== Reception ==
Kirkus Reviews gave the book a positive review, praising the portrayal of the characters and the believability of the fantasy aspects. They concluded that it was "a well-paced, clever and scary supernatural-suspense story". Publishers Weekly similarly gave it a positive review, describing it as a "fun adventure" that does well in capturing the feel of the Victorian age.

The novel was an OLA Red Maple Award Nominee in 2012.
