= Baudin Conservation Park =

Protected area in South Australia

- IUCN category III (natural monument or feature)
- Location within South Australia
- Location: South Australia
- Nearest city: Penneshaw
- Coordinates: 35°43′29″S 137°57′52″E
- Area: 310 ha (770 acres)
- Established: 28 March 2002
- Governing body: Department for Environment and Water
- Website: http://www.environment.sa.gov.au/parks/Find_a_Park/Browse_by_region/Kangaroo_Island/Baudin

Baudin Conservation Park is a protected area located on the north coast of Dudley Peninsula on Kangaroo Island in South Australia about 2 kilometres (1.2 miles) south east of Penneshaw. It was proclaimed under the National Parks and Wildlife Act 1972 in 2002. The conservation park is classified as an IUCN Category III protected area.
