= Cape Willoughby =

Cape Willoughby Willoughby, South Australia
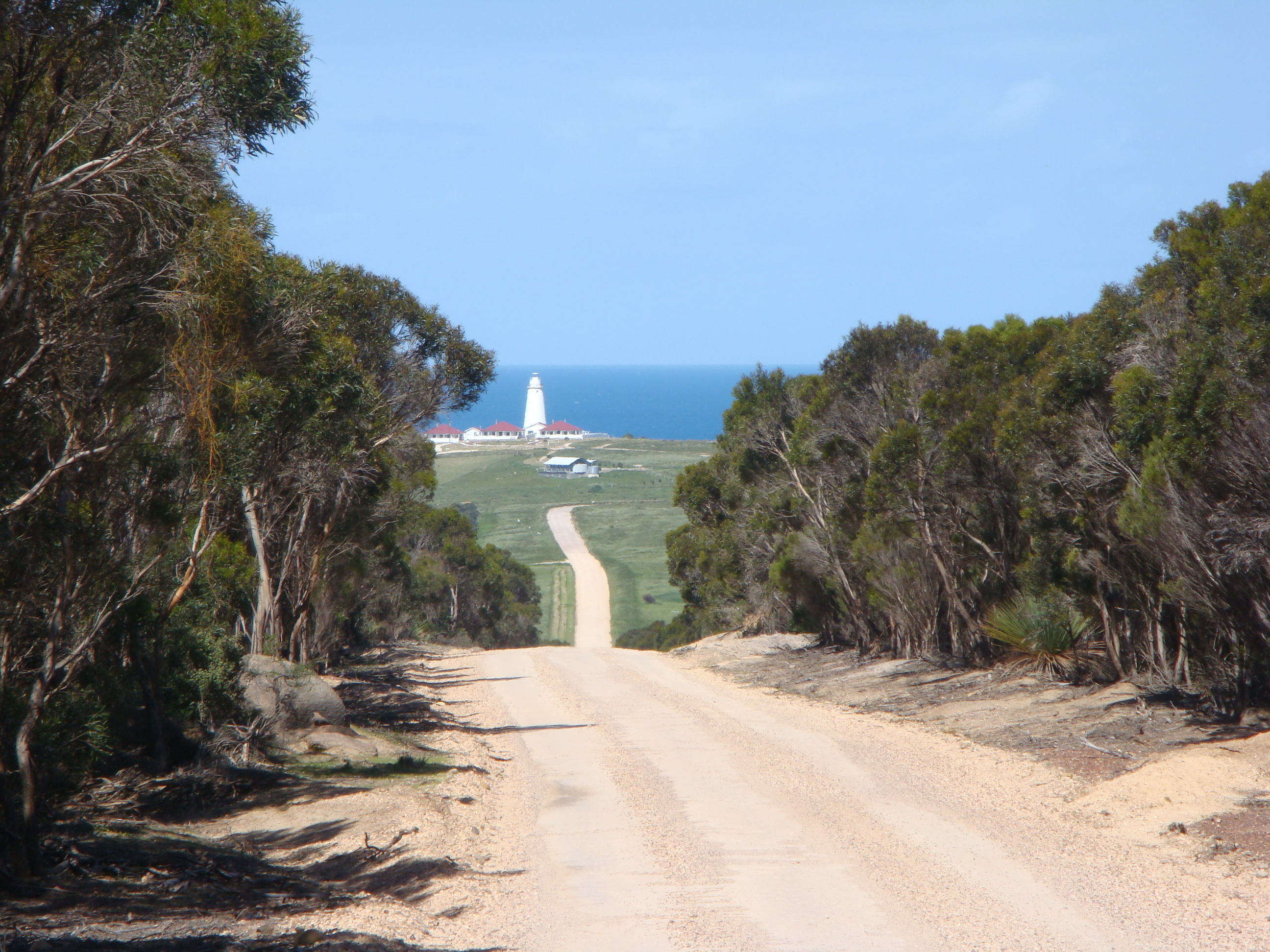
- Cape Willoughby Lightstation. Cape Willoughby, Kangaroo Island

- Coordinates: 35°50′34″S 138°08′00″E
- Elevation: 53 m (174 ft)
- Location: 22 km (14 mi) south east of Penneshaw

Cape Willoughby is a headland in the Australian state of South Australia located on the east end of the Dudley Peninsula on Kangaroo Island in the gazetted locality of Willoughby about 22 kilometres (14 miles) south east of the town of Penneshaw.

The cape is described as being ‘the Eastern extremity of Kangaroo Island, is a bold, rocky headland, 53 metres (174 feet) high.’ It was named after a village in Lincolnshire by the British navigator, Matthew Flinders, on 7 April 1802.

Part of the cape is within the Cape Willoughby Conservation Park while the waters adjoining its northern shoreline are within the Encounter Marine Park. The cape is the site of South Australia’s first lighthouse which was first illuminated on 16 January 1852.

== Climate ==
Climate data for Cape Willoughby, Willoughby, South Australia (55m ASL)
Month	Jan	Feb	Mar	Apr	May	Jun	Jul	Aug	Sep	Oct	Nov	Dec	Year
Record high °C (°F)	42.2 (108.0)	39.3 (102.7)	38.5 (101.3)	32.7 (90.9)	26.0 (78.8)	23.1 (73.6)	21.2 (70.2)	22.1 (71.8)	27.5 (81.5)	33.7 (92.7)	39.0 (102.2)	41.0 (105.8)	42.2 (108.0)
Mean daily maximum °C (°F)	21.8 (71.2)	21.8 (71.2)	20.7 (69.3)	19.2 (66.6)	17.0 (62.6)	14.9 (58.8)	14.2 (57.6)	14.6 (58.3)	16.0 (60.8)	17.7 (63.9)	19.3 (66.7)	20.8 (69.4)	18.2 (64.8)
Daily mean °C (°F)	18.8 (65.8)	19.1 (66.4)	18.2 (64.8)	16.7 (62.1)	14.8 (58.6)	12.9 (55.2)	12.0 (53.6)	12.1 (53.8)	13.2 (55.8)	14.6 (58.3)	16.2 (61.2)	17.6 (63.7)	15.5 (59.9)
Mean daily minimum °C (°F)	16.0 (60.8)	16.3 (61.3)	15.6 (60.1)	14.2 (57.6)	12.6 (54.7)	10.9 (51.6)	9.8 (49.6)	9.7 (49.5)	10.5 (50.9)	11.6 (52.9)	13.1 (55.6)	14.5 (58.1)	12.9 (55.2)
Record low °C (°F)	6.1 (43.0)	9.2 (48.6)	7.2 (45.0)	5.2 (41.4)	4.8 (40.6)	5.2 (41.4)	3.6 (38.5)	4.2 (39.6)	3.3 (37.9)	3.4 (38.1)	5.7 (42.3)	7.0 (44.6)	3.3 (37.9)
Average rainfall mm (inches)	18.7 (0.74)	18.1 (0.71)	20.9 (0.82)	38.8 (1.53)	60.8 (2.39)	74.9 (2.95)	80.7 (3.18)	73.4 (2.89)	56.0 (2.20)	40.8 (1.61)	27.9 (1.10)	22.9 (0.90)	533.2 (20.99)
Average rainy days	4.7	4.7	6.6	10.3	14.7	16.7	18.7	18.1	14.6	11.4	8.3	6.7	135.5
Average relative humidity (%) (at 3pm)	65	65	67	68	72	74	74	72	69	66	66	64	69

== See also ==
- Willoughby, Lincolnshire
