= Encounter Marine Park =

Marine park in Australia

- Location within South Australia
- Location: South Australia
- Nearest city: Delamere
- Coordinates: 35.69603°S 138.14082°E
- Governing body: Department of Environment and Water
- Website: Official website

Encounter Marine Park is a marine park in South Australia. It is in the Fleurieu Peninsula in state of South Australia, close to Adelaide.

The land around Encounter Marine Park is mostly hilly, but its immediate surroundings are different. The nearest reasonably sized town is Delamere, 13.1 km north. In the region around Encounter Marine Park, coves, and bays are very common. The climate of the marine park is cool with an average temperature of 17 °C. The warmest month is December, at 24 °C, and the coldest July, at 6 °C. The average rainfall is 863 millimetres per year. The wettest month is June, with 172 millimetres of rain, and the driest January, with 24 mm.

The park is popular for whale watching and also home to the site of the HMAS Hobart shipwreck, which is now a diving spot.
