= Penneshaw, South Australia =

Penneshaw
- Town
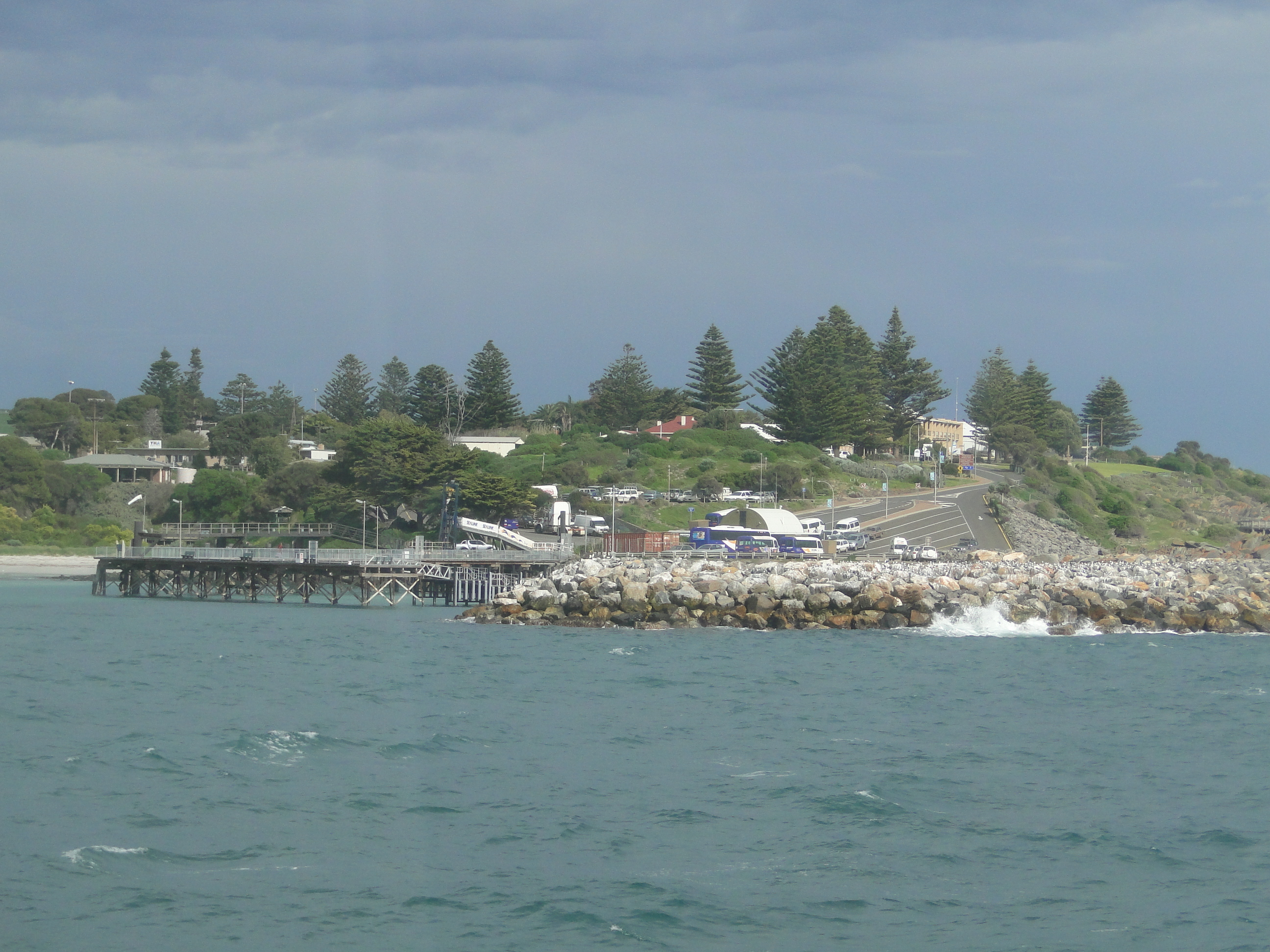
- Penneshaw harbour

- Coordinates: 35°43′06″S 137°56′25″E
- Country: Australia
- State: South Australia
- Region: Fleurieu and Kangaroo Island
- LGA: Kangaroo Island Council
- Location: 107 km (66 mi) south of Adelaide

Government
  - State electorate: Mawson
  - Federal division: Mayo

Population
  - Total: 269 (SAL 2021)
- Time zone: UTC+9:30 (ACST)
  - Summer (DST): UTC+10:30 (ACDT)
- Postcode: 5222
- County: Carnarvon
- Mean max temp: 18.1 °C (64.6 °F)
- Mean min temp: 12.8 °C (55.0 °F)
- Annual rainfall: 538.4 mm (21.20 in)
Localities around Penneshaw
Backstairs Passage	Backstairs Passage	Backstairs Passage
Kangaroo Head	Penneshaw	Ironstone
Kangaroo Head	Dudley East	Ironstone
- Location; Climate; Adjoining localities

Penneshaw is a township in the Australian state of South Australia located on the northeast coast of the Dudley Peninsula on Kangaroo Island about 107 kilometres (66 mi) south of the state capital of Adelaide. It is the island's main ferry port with regular services from Cape Jervis. Penneshaw features a Maritime and Folk Museum, and evening tours to a colony of little penguin, the only species of penguin to breed in Australian waters. At the 2011 census, Penneshaw had a population of 276.

Originally known as Hog Bay due to the pigs released by French Commander Nicholas Baudin, Penneshaw was named after a combination of the names of Dr. F.W.Pennefather, private secretary to Governor Jervois, and Flora Louisa Shaw, The Times colonial editor, a visitor to Government House.

South Australia's first modern seawater desalination plant was established at Penneshaw in the 1990s, to supplement the town's limited dam water supply.

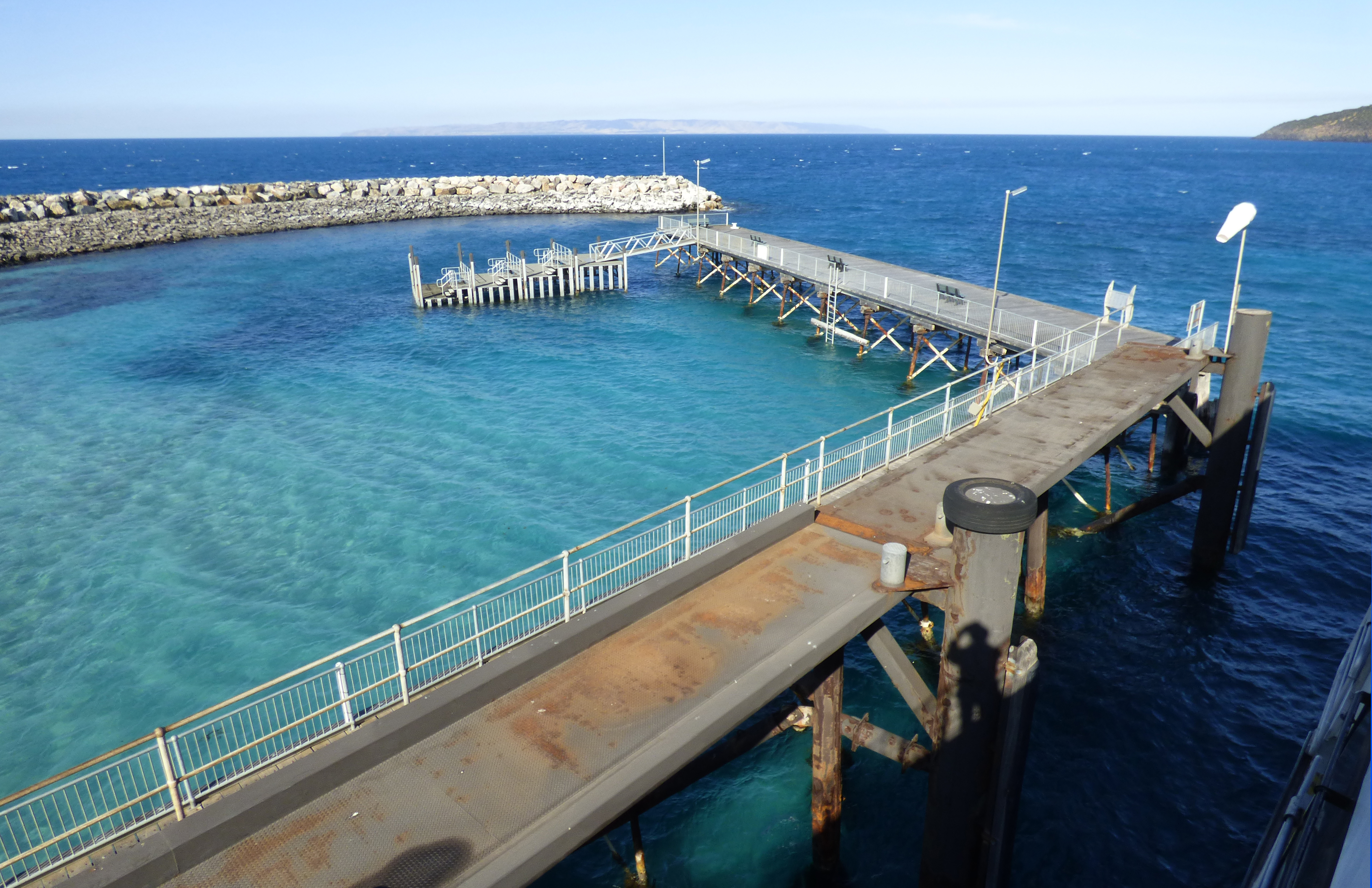
Penneshaw jetty

== Penneshaw jetty ==
In 1901, the Government authorised a budget of £1,800 for the construction of a jetty at Penneshaw (then known as Hog Bay). Appeals for the extension and improvement of the jetty followed in 1905 and 1906. Jetty extension works were undertaken by brothers J. and W. Tait of Port Adelaide in late 1908, using methods similar to those used at Glenelg and Edithburgh. At that time the outer part of the jetty was only 9 feet wide.

A breakwater was later constructed to provide shelter from rough seas for visiting ships.

In 2012, the Penneshaw jetty was extended to provide a cruise ship tender vessel landing facility to accommodate growing numbers of short-term visitors arriving by cruise ship. In the 2014–15 season, seven cruise ships landed passengers at Pennseshaw with eight or nine ships expected the following season. The jetty can also be enjoyed by snorkelers and scuba divers, and is known for supporting Gorgonian corals.

Today, the timber jetty and breakwater provide a sheltered landing for the ferry that travels to and from Cape Jervis daily and for tenders landing passengers from visiting cruise ships.

== Attractions ==
- Anglican Parish of Kangaroo Island Church of St Columba
- Christmas Cove
- Frenchman's Rock – In 1803 the French explorer Nicolas Baudin anchored in Hog Bay and one of his crew noted the arrival of the expedition by carving on a rock. The rock was later removed and is now located in the Gateway Information Centre. A replica now occupies the rock's original location on Penneshaw Beach.
- Hog Bay
- Maritime and Folk Museum
- Penneshaw Penguin Centre – Nocturnal tours of the local little penguin colony with experienced guides are offered.
- The Uniting Church (formerly Methodist) built c. 1883, the first church established on Kangaroo Island.

== Heritage places ==
Frenchman's Rock, Penneshaw 1803

Penneshaw includes the following places that are listed on the South Australian Heritage Register – Christmas Cove, Frenchman's Rock Monument and Penneshaw Cemetery.

== Little penguin colony ==
An account of penguins observed by Matthew Flinders' expedition of 1802 in the vicinity of Kangaroo Head (immediately west of Penneshaw) describes "thousands" of little penguins landing in the area. Other published accounts of little penguins at Penneshaw exist from 1948, 1951, 1982, 1988 1989 and 1998.

In July 1984, two dogs killed 80 penguins at the Penneshaw foreshore in a single night. The mortality event reduced the population there by almost half. Another dog attack at Penneshaw in March 2003 resulted in over 30 penguins being killed.

As of June 2011, the number of little penguins in the section of the colony which is monitored by the Penneshaw Penguin Centre appears to have declined over the prior 10 years.

Penneshaw Little Penguin Colony (Breeding Individuals)
Year	Population (low)	Population (high)	Reference
1984	200	200	
2008	216	356	
2011	304	304	
2012	148	148	
2013	112	112	

Restoration work to provide improve habitat for little penguins near Penneshaw is ongoing. As of 2013, an 800m coastal strip between Frenchman's Rock and Baudin Conservation Park is the focus site. Works include the removal of weeds, planting of native plants and installation of nesting boxes.

== Governance ==
Penneshaw is located within the federal division of Mayo, the state electoral district of Mawson and the local government area of the Kangaroo Island Council.

== See also ==
- List of little penguin colonies
